= List of dams and reservoirs in Indonesia =

This page shows the state-wise list of dams and reservoirs in Indonesia.In 2015, there were 231 dams in Indonesia. After that, the Ministry of Public Works and Housing (PUPR) constructed 61 dams during the period 2015–2024, bringing the total to 292 dams in March 2024.

Dam	Location	River	Installed capacity (MW)	Reservoir area (km^{2})	Completion year
Batujai Dam	Lombok, West Nusa Tenggara	Penujak River		169	1982
Batutegi Dam	Tanggamus, Lampung	Way Sekampung	125	35	2002
Bili-Bili Dam	Gowa, South Sulawesi	Jeneberang River	19.2	29	1998
Cacaban Dam	Tegal, Central Java	Kali Gung		6.8	1952
Cirata Dam	Purwakarta, West Java	Citarum River	1,008	62	1988
Gajah Mungkur Dam	Wonogiri, Central Java	Bengawan Solo River	12.4	88	1981
Gondang Dam	Lamongan, East Java				2002
Jatigede Dam	Sumedang, West Java	Cimanuk River	110	49.8	2015
Jatiluhur Dam	Purwakarta, West Java	Citarum River	186.5	83	1967
Kedungombo Dam	Grobogan, Central Java	Serang River	22.5	67	1989
Riam Kanan Dam	Banjar, South Kalimantan	Riam Kanan River	13.5	9.45	1973
Saguling Dam	Bandung, West Java	Citarum River	700	53	1986
Sempor Dam	Kebumen, Central Java	Cacaban River		6.9	1978
Sigura-gura Dam	North Tapanuli, North Sumatera	Asahan River	286		1981
Soedirman Dam	Banjarnegara, Central Java	Serayu River	206	14.2	1982
Sutami Dam	Malang, East Java	Brantas River	3x35	30	1972
Tilong Dam	Kupang, East Nusa Tenggara			36.47	2001
Wadaslintang Dam	Kebumen, Central Java	Bedegolan River	36	24	1988
Wonorejo Dam	Tulungagung, East Java	Ngrowo River	6.2	6.3	2001
