= List of power stations in Indonesia =

The following lists some of the larger power stations in Indonesia. Data are not included for a large number of small isolated plants (mostly diesel) in the Outer Islands. In total, the PLN operated over 5,000 plants across Indonesia in 2010 of which over 4,500 were small diesel plants outside of Java. For further details about existing capacity and operations of the electricity sector, see information about the state-owned Indonesian electricity company Perusahaan Listrik Negara.

== Non-renewable ==
=== Thermal ===
Thermal power is the largest source of power in Indonesia. There are different types of thermal power plants based on the fuel used to generate the steam such as coal, gas, diesel, etc. About 85% of electricity consumed in Indonesia is generated by thermal power plants.

==== Bituminous coal or lignite ====
===== Existing =====
Note: IPP means independent power producer.

Power station	Location	District	Province	Region	Coordinates	Capacity per unit (MW)	Installed capacity (MW)	Operator	Sector	Notes	Refs
Bukit Asam coal-fired	Tanjung Enim	Muara Enim	South Sumatra	Sumatra		4 x 65	260	PT. PLN	Government	Boiler from Stein, turbines from Rateau and generators from GEC Alstom	
Paiton (PLN) coal-fired	Paiton	Probolinggo	East Java	Java-Bali	7.7155°S 113.5849°E	2 x 400	800	PT. PLN	Government	Boiler from ABB Combustion Engineering, turbines and generators from Toshiba	
Ombilin coal-fired	Ombilin	Sawahlunto	West Sumatra	Sumatra		2 x 100	200	PT. PLN	Government	Boiler from Stein, turbines and generators from GEC Alstom	
Suralaya coal-fired	Suralaya	Cilegon	Banten	Java-Bali		4 x 400; 3 x 600	3,400	PT. Indonesia Power	Government	Boiler from Babcock & Wilcox Canada, turbines from MHI Japan; generators from Mitsubishi Electric Co.	
Suralaya Baru coal-fired	Suralaya	Cilegon	Banten	Java-Bali	5.892°N 106.03°E	1 x 625	625	PT. Indonesia Power	Government	Boiler from Shanghai Co. Ltd, turbines and generators from Shanghai Co. Ltd	
Paiton	Paiton	Probolinggo	East Java	Java-Bali		2 x 670; 2 x 610; 1 x 850	2,300	PT. Paiton Energy (IPP)	Private	Boiler supplied by ABB, turbines and generators supplied by GE	
Tanjung Jati-B I coal-fired	Bangsri	Jepara	East Java	Java-Bali		2 x 662	1,320	PT. Central Java Power (IPP)	Private	Boiler supplied by Babcock & Wilcox, turbines and generators supplied by Toshiba	
Tanjung Jati-B II coal-fired	Bangsri	Jepara	East Java	Java-Bali		2 x 662	1,320	PT. Central Java Power (IPP)	Private	Boiler supplied by Mitsubishi Heavy Industry, turbines and generators supplied by Toshiba	
Cirebon coal-fired	Kanci Kulon	Cirebon	West Java	Java-Bali	6.7704°S 108.6151°E	1 x 660	660	PT. Cirebon Electric Power (IPP)	Private	Boiler, turbines and generators supplied by Doosan Heavy Industries and Construction Co., Ltd.	
Cilacap	Karangkandri	Cilacap	Central Java	Java-Bali	07°40′31.20″S 109°05′47.40″E	2 x 300	600	PT. Sumber Segara Primadaya (IPP)	Government	Boiler supplied by Dongfang Electric Corp. Ltd, turbines and generators supplied by Dongfang Electric Corp. Ltd	
Cilacap Adipala coal-fired	Adipala	Cilacap	Central Java	Java-Bali		1 x 660	660	PT. Indonesia Power	Government	Boiler supplied by Shanghai Electric Corp. Ltd, turbines and generators supplied by Shanghai Electric Corp. Ltd	
Indramayu coal-fired	Sumur Adem	Indramayu	West Java	Java-Bali		3 x 330	990	PT. PLN	Government	Boiler supplied by Babcock & Wilcox Beijing Co., turbines and generators supplied by Beijing Beizhong	
Pacitan coal-fired	Sukorejo	Pacitan	East Java	Java-Bali		2 x 315	630	PT. PLN	Government	Boiler supplied by Dongfang Electric Corp. Ltd, turbines and generators supplied by Dongfang Electric Corp. Ltd	
Tarahan coal-fired	Tarahan	South Lampung	Lampung	Sumatra		2 x 100	200	PT. PLN	Government	Boiler supplied by Jinan Co. Ltd, turbines and generators supplied by Wuhan Co. Ltd	
Labuan coal-fired	Labuan	Pandeglang	Banten	Java-Bali		2 x 300	600	PT. Indonesia Power	Government	Boiler supplied by Dongfang Electric Corp. Ltd, turbines and generators supplied by Dongfang Electric Corp. Ltd	
Labuhan Angin coal-fired	Labuhan Angin	Central Tapanuli	North Sumatra	Sumatra		2 x 115	230	PT. PLN	Government	Boiler supplied by Foster Wheeler, turbines and generators supplied by Shanghai Turbine Co. Ltd.	
Lontar coal-fired	Lontar, Teluk Naga	Tangerang	Banten	Java-Bali		3 x 315	945	PT. Indonesia Power	Government	Boiler supplied by Dongfang Electric Corp. Ltd, turbines and generators supplied by Dongfang Electric Corp. Ltd	
Pelabuhan Ratu coal-fired	Pelabuhan Ratu	Sukabumi	West Java	Java-Bali		3 x 350	1050	PT. Indonesia Power	Government	Boiler supplied by Shanghai Electric Corp. Ltd, turbines and generators supplied by Shanghai Electric Corp. Ltd	
Rembang coal-fired	Sluke	Rembang	Central Java	Java-Bali	06°38′18.21″S 111°28′27.41″E	2 x 315	630	PT. PLN	Government	Boiler supplied by Dongfang Electric Corp. Ltd, turbines and generators supplied by Dongfang Electric Corp. Ltd	
Bangka Belitung 3 coal-fired	Air Anyir	Bangka	Bangka Belitung	Sumatera		2 x 30	60	PT. BMP (IPP)	Government		
Total						50	18,630				

===== Proposed or under construction =====
Power station	Location	District	Province	Region	Capacity per unit (MW)	Installed capacity (MW)	Operator	Sector	Remarks and plant coordinates
Java 4 coal-fired	Tubanan, Kembang	Jepara	Central Java	Java-Bali	2 x 1000	2,000	PT. Bhumi Jati Power	Private	
Java 7 coal-fired	Kramatwatu	Serang	Banten	Java-Bali	2 x 1000	2,000	PT. Shenhua Guohua Pembangkitan Jawa Bali	Private	
Central Java coal-fired (by the end of 2016)	Ujungnegoro	Batang	Central Java	Java-Bali	2 x 1000	2,000	PT. Bhimasena Power Indonesia	Private	
Tanjung Awar-Awar coal-fired	Kaliuntu	Tuban	East Java	Java-Bali	2 x 350	700	PT. PLN	Government	Boiler supplied by Babcock & Wilcox Beijing Co., turbines and generators supplied by Beijing Beizhong
Madura coal-fired		Pamekasan	East Java	Java-Bali	2 x 100	200	PT. PLN	Government	
Bojonegara coal-fired	Bojonegara	Cilegon	Banten	Java-Bali	3 x 740	2,220	PT. PLN	Government	
Tanjung Jati-A coal-fired	Cirebon	Cirebon	West Java	Java-Bali	2 x 660	1,320	PT. Bakrie Power	Private	
Nusa Penida coal-fired		Nusa Penida	Bali	Java-Bali	2 x 100	200	PT. PLN	Government	
Anyer coal-fired	Anyer		Banten	Java-Bali	1 x 330	330	PT. PLN	Government	
Kuala Tanjung coal-fired	Kuala Tanjung		South Sumatra	Sumatra	2 x 112	224	PT. Ranyza Energi	Private	
Banjarsari coal-fired	Banjarsari	Lahat	South Sumatra	Sumatra	2 x 100	200	PT. Bukit Pembangkit Innovative	Private	
Banyuasin coal-fired	Banyuasin	Banyuasin	South Sumatra	Sumatra	2 x 100	200	PT. Banyuasin Power Energy	Private	
Baturaja coal-fired	Baturaja	Ogan Komering Ulu	South Sumatra	Sumatra	2 x 100	200	PT. Priamanaya Power Energi	Private	
Simpang Belimbing coal-fired	Gunung Raja	Muara Enim	South Sumatra	Sumatra	2 x 150	300	PT. GH EMMI	Private	
Arahan coal-fired	Arahan	Muara Enim	South Sumatra	Sumatra	4 x 600	2,400	PT. PLN	Government	
Central Bangko coal-fired	Bangko Tengah	Muara Enim	South Sumatra	Sumatra	4 x 620	2,480	PT. BA & CHD (China)	Private	
West Kalimantan 1 coal-fired	Tanjung Gundul	Bengkayang	West Kalimantan	Kalimantan	2 x 100	200	PT. GCL Indotenaga	Government - private	
Tanjung coal-fired	Tanjung	Tabalong	South Kalimantan	Kalimantan	2 x 55	110	PT. PLN	Government	
Total					34	17,264			

==== Gas or liquid fuel ====
Power station	Location	District	Province	Region	Coordinates	Capacity per unit (MW)	Capacity (MW)	Operator	Sector	Refs
Bekasi	West Java						130			
Betara	Lampung						70			
Grati CCGT	Grati	Pasuruan	East Java	Java-Bali	7.6517°S 113.0244°E	3 x 100.75 GTPP; 3 x 100.75 SPP; 1 x 159.58 CCPP	764	PT. Indonesia Power	Government	
Gresik CCGT	Gresik	Gresik	East Java	Java-Bali	7.1633°S 112.6615°E	4 x GTPP; 4 x SPP; 3 x CCPP	2,255	PT. Pembangkitan Jawa Bali	Government	
Muara Tawar CCGT	Tarumajaya	Bekasi	West Java	Java-Bali	06°05′09.37″S 106°59′48.15″E	2 x GTPP; 3 x CCPP	920	PT. Pembangkitan Jawa Bali	Government	
Muara Karang CCGT	Muara Karang	North Jakarta	DKI Jakarta	Java-Bali	6.1087°S 106.7877°E	5 x STPP; 1 x CCPP	1,208	PT. Pembangkitan Jawa Bali	Government	
Palembang Timur	South Sumatra						150			
PLTG Senipah	Senipah	Kutai Kartanegara	East Kalimantan	Kalimantan		2x 46 GTG	92	PT. Kertanegara Energi Perkasa	IPP	
PLTG/MG Kalbar Peaker	Parit Baru	Mempawah	West Kalimantan	Kalimantan		100	100	PT. PLN	Government	2019
Sengkang	South Sulawesi						150			
Tambak Lorok CCGT	Tambak Lorok	Semarang	Central Java	Java-Bali		6 x 109.65 GTPP; 2 x 50 SPP; 1 x 200 SPP; 2 x 188 CCPP	1,334	PT. Indonesia Power	Government	
Tanjung Priok CCGT	Tanjung Priok	North Jakarta	DKI Jakarta	Java-Bali		2 x 26 GTPP; 2 x 48.8 GTPP; 2 x 50 SPP; 6 x 130 CCGT; 2 x 200 CCGT	1,430	PT. Indonesia Power	Government	
Senayan Diesel	Senayan	Jakarta	DKI Jakarta	Java-Bali	-6.2160361, 106.7953257	6 x 2.52	15	PT. Indonesia Power	Government	
PLTU 400 MW	Ciwandan	Cilegon	Banten	Java-Bali		5 x 80 STG	400 MW	PT. Krakatau Daya Listrik	SOE	
PLTGU 120 MW	Ciwandan	Cilegon	Banten	Java-Bali		2 x 39 GTG; 1 x 43 STG	120 MW	PT. Krakatau Daya Listrik	SOE	
Total						68	8,446			

== Renewable ==
=== Geothermal ===
Note: IPP means independent power producer.

Power station	Location	District	Province	Region	Capacity per unit (MW)	Installed capacity (MW)	Operator	Sector	Remarks
Kamojang geothermal	Kamojang	Garut	West Java	Java-Bali	Unit I = 30; Unit II = 55; Unit III = 55; Unit IV = 60; Unit V = 35	235	PT. Indonesia Power	Government	Unit IV 63 MW turbine capacity and 80 MVA generator capacity both from Fuji Electric, Kawasaki, Japan
Darajat geothermal	Kamojang	Garut	West Java	Java-Bali	Unit I = 55	55	PT. Indonesia Power	Government	
Darajat geothermal	Kamojang	Garut	West Java	Java-Bali	Unit II = 90; Unit III = 110	200	PT. Pertamina, Chevron Geothermal Indonesia, Ltd (IPP)	Private	Turbines Unit II = 81.3 MW & Unit III = 110 MW and generators Unit II = 101.625 MVA & Unit III = 137.5 MVA both supplied by Fuji Electric, Kawasaki, Japan
Gunung Salak geothermal	Parung Kuda	Sukabumi	West Java	Java-Bali	3 x 60	180	PT. Indonesia Power	Government	Turbines @ 55 MW and generators @ 55 MVA both supplied by Ansaldo Energia, Italy
Gunung Salak geothermal	Parung Kuda	Sukabumi	West Java	Java-Bali	3 x 55	165	Chevron Geothermal Salak Ltd and Dayabumi Salak Pratama Ltd (IPP)	Private	Turbines @ 59.5 MW and generators @ 74.375 MVA both from Fuji Electric, Kawasaki, Japan
Ulubelu Geothermal Power Station	Ulubelu	Tanggamus	Lampung	Sumatra	2 x 55	110	PT. PLN	Government	Turbines 2 × 55 MW and generators 2 x 55 MVA both from Fuji Electric, Kawasaki, Japan
Wayang Windu geothermal	Pengalengan	Bandung	West Java	Java-Bali	1 x 110; 1 x 117 (1 x 127 by mid-2013)	227	PT. Pertamina and Magma Nusantara Ltd. (IPP)	Private	Turbines 110 MW & 117 MW and generators 2 x 137.5 MVA both from Fuji Electric, Kawasaki, Japan
Dieng geothermal	Dieng	Banjarnegara	Central Java	Java-Bali	1 x 60	60	PT. Geo Dipa Energi (IPP)	Private	
Lahendong geothermal	Lahendong	Minahasa	North Sulawesi	Sulawesi	Unit I = 20; Unit II = 20; Unit III = 20; Unit IV = 20	80	PT. PLN	Government	* Unit I: turbines = 20 MW and generator = 25 MVA both from Alstom * Unit II: turbines = 20 MW and generator = 25 MVA both from Fuji Electric, Kawasaki, Japan * Unit III: turbines = 20 MW and generator = 25 MVA both from Fuji Electric, Kawasaki, Japan * Unit IV: turbines = 20 MW and generator = 25 MVA both supplied by Fuji Electric, Kawasaki, Japan
Sibayak geothermal	Sibayak	Karo	North Sumatra	Sumatra	2 x 5.65	11.3	PT. Dizamatara Powerindo (IPP)	Private	Turbines @ 5.85 MW and generators @ 6 MVA, 5.65 MW at PF 0.94
Patuha geothermal	Patuha	Bandung	West Java	Java-Bali	Unit 1 = 55	55 (by-mid 2014)	PT. Geo Dipa Energi (IPP)	Private	Turbines Unit 1 = 60 MW and generator Unit 1 = 75 MVA both supplied by Toshiba
Total					19	1,344			

=== Hydroelectric ===
Note: IPP means independent power producer.

Power station	Location	District	Province	Region	Capacity per unit (MW)	Installed capacity (MW)	Operator	Sector	Remarks
Agam hydro	Batang Agam	Agam	West Sumatra	Sumatra	3 x 3.5	10	PT. PLN	Government	Turbines @ 3.55 MW and generators @ 3.95 MVA both supplied by Ebara
Maninjau hydro	Maninjau	Agam	West Sumatra	Sumatra	4 x 17	68	PT. PLN	Government	Turbines @ 17.4 MW and generators @ 20 MVA both supplied by Toshiba
Singkarak hydro	Singkarak	Solok	West Sumatra	Sumatra	4 x 43.75	175	PT. PLN	Government	Turbines @ 43.75 MW supplied by VoestAlpine and generators @ 52 MVA supplied by ELIN (now ANDRITZ Hydro)
Koto Panjang hydro	Koto Panjang	Kampar	Riau	Sumatra	3 x 38	114	PT. PLN	Government	Turbines @ 39.4 MW supplied by Kvaerner Boving and generators @ 45 MVA supplied by ELIN (now ANDRITZ Hydro)
Test I hydro	Tes	Rejang Lebong	Bengkulu	Sumatra	4 x 4	16	PT. PLN	Government	Turbines @ 4.7 MW supplied by Ansaldo Energia
Musi hydro	Ujanmas Atas	Kepahiang	Bengkulu	Sumatra	3 x 70	210	PT. PLN	Government	Turbines @ 70 MW and generators @ 86 MVA both supplied by VA Tech Hydro (now ANDRITZ Hydro)
Besai hydro	Sumberjaya	West Lampung	Lampung	Sumatra	2 x 45	90	PT. PLN	Government	Turbines @ 46.4 MW and generators @ 53 MVA both supplied by VA Tech Hydro (now ANDRITZ Hydro)
Batutegi hydro	Tanggamus	West Lampung	Lampung	Sumatra	2 x 14	28	PT. PLN	Government	Turbines @ 14.2 MW and generators @ 15.7 MVA both supplied by Toshiba
Lau Renun hydro	Silalahi	Dairi	North Sumatra	Sumatra	2 x 41	82	PT. PLN	Government	Turbines @ 41 MW and generators @ 47.5 MVA both supplied by VA Tech Hydro (now ANDRITZ Hydro)
Sipansihaporas hydro	Sipansihaporas	Central Tapanuli	North Sumatra	Sumatra	1 x 33; 1 x 17	50	PT. PLN	Government	Power Station 1 = Turbines 34 MW by Meiden, Japan and generator 39 MVA by Toshiba; Power Station 2 = 17.6 MW Meiden, Japan and generator 20 MVA by Toshiba
Asahan I hydro	Parmaksian	Toba Samosir	North Sumatra	Sumatra	2 x 90	180	PT. Bajradaya Sentranusa (IPP)	Private	Turbines and generators supplied by Dongfang Electric Corp. Ltd
Asahan III hydro	Pintu Pohan Meranti	Toba Samosir	North Sumatra	Sumatra	2 x 87	174	PT. PLN	Government	
Sigura-gura hydro	Simorea	Asahan	North Sumatra	Sumatra	4 x 71.50	286	PT. Inalum	Private	Turbines @ 71.5 MW and generators @ 80 MVA both supplied by Toshiba
Tangga hydro	Tangga	Asahan	North Sumatra	Sumatra	4 x 79.25	317	PT. Inalum	Private	Turbines @ 81.1 MW supplied by Hitachi Ltd. and generators @ 90 MVA supplied by Mitsubishi Electric
Wampu hydro	Kota Buluh	Karo	North Sumatra	Sumatra	3 x 15	45	PT. Wampu Electric Power (IPP)	Private	
Kerinci hydro	Batang Merangin	Kerinci	Jambi	Sumatra	6 x 30	180	PT. PLN	Government	Turbines @ 30 MW and generators @ 33.33 MVA
Saguling hydro	Rajamandala	Cimahi	West Java	Java-Bali	4 x 175.18	701	PT. Indonesia Power	Government	Turbines @ 175.18 MW supplied by Toshiba and Generators @ 194? MVA supplied by Mitsubishi Electric Co,.
Cirata hydro	Plered	Purwakarta	West Java	Java-Bali	8 x 126	1,008	PT. Pembangkitan Jawa Bali	Government	Turbines @ 129.6 MW supplied by VoestAlpine and generators @ 140 MVA supplied by ELIN (now ANDRITZ Hydro)
Jatiluhur hydro	Jatiluhur	Purwakarta	West Java	Java-Bali	6 x 31	186	PT. Jasa Tirta II	Government	Turbines @ 32.3 MW supplied by NEYRPIC and generators @ 35 MVA supplied by GEC Alsthom Jeumont
PB. Sudirman hydro	Mrica	Banjarnegara	Central Java	Java-Bali	3 x 60.3	181	PT. Indonesia Power	Government	Turbines supplied by Boving and generators supplied by ASEA
Sutami hydro	Karangkates	Malang	East Java	Java-Bali	3 x 35	105	PT. Pembangkitan Jawa Bali	Government	
Wlingi hydro	Wlingi	Malang	East Java	Java-Bali	2 x 27	54	PT. Pembangkitan Jawa Bali	Government	
Tonsea Lama hydro	Tondano	Minahasa	North Sulawesi	Sulawesi	1 x 4.44; 1 x 4.50; 1 x 5.44	14	PT. PLN	Government	
Tanggari I & II hydro	Tondano	Minahasa	North Sulawesi	Sulawesi	1 x 17.20; 1 x 19	36	PT. PLN	Government	
Bakaru I & II hydro	Bakaru	Pinrang	South Sulawesi	Sulawesi	2 x 63; 1 x 65	191	PT. PLN	Government	
Larona hydro	Soroako	East Luwu	South Sulawesi	Sulawesi	3 x 65	195	INCO	Private	Turbines @ 67.3 MW supplied by Sulzer & GE and generators @ 85 MVA supplied by Hitachi & VA Tech Hydro
Balambano hydro	Soroako	East Luwu	South Sulawesi	Sulawesi	2 x 70	140	INCO	Private	Turbines @ 68.5 MW and generators @ 80.6 MVA both supplied by Canadian General Electric
Karebbe hydro	Soroako	East Luwu	South Sulawesi	Sulawesi	2 x 66	132	INCO	Private	Turbines @ 63.7 MW and generators @ 78 MVA both supplied by VA Tech Hydro (now ANDRITZ Hydro)
Pamona 2 hydro	Pamona Utara	Poso	Central Sulawesi	Sulawesi	4 x 65	260	PT. Poso Energi (IPP)	Private	Turbines @ 66.66 MW and generators @ 72.2 MVA
Riam Kanan hydro	Aranio	Martapura	South Kalimantan	Kalimantan	3 x 10	30	PT. PLN	Government	Turbines @ 10.5 MW and generators @ 11 MVA both supplied by Fuji Electric Co,. Ltd, Japan
Total					88	4,755			

=== Pumped-storage hydroelectric ===
Currently under construction or planned:

Power station	Location	District	Province	Region	Capacity per unit (MW)	Installed capacity (MW)	Operator	Sector	Remarks
Upper Cisokan pumped storage hydro (COD 2015)	Cianjur; Cisokan river and Cirumamis river	Cianjur and Bandung Barat	West Java	Java-Bali	4 x 260 MW pump turbine or 4 x 275 MVA motor generator	1,040 MW pump turbine or 1,100 MVA motor generator	PT. PLN	Government	
Matenggeng pumped storage hydro (COD 2020)	Majenang; Cijolang river and Cimancing river	Ciamis	West Java	Java-Bali	2 x 443 MW pump turbine or 2 x 460 MVA motor generator	886 MW pump turbine or 920 MVA motor generator	PT. PLN	Government	
Grindulu pumped storage hydro (COD 2021)	Tegalombo	Pacitan	East Java	Java	4 x 260 MW pump turbine or 4 x 75 MVA motor generator	1,040 MW pump turbine or 1,100 MVA motor generator	PT. PLN	Government	
Kali Konto pumped storage hydro (COD 2027)	Bandar Kedungmulyo	Jombang	East Java	Java-Bali	4 x 260 MW pump turbine or 4 x 275 MVA motor generator	1,040 MW pump turbine or 1,100 MVA motor generator	PT. PLN	Government	
Lake Toba pumped storage hydro (COD 2020)	Toba	Toba Samosir	North Sumatera	Sumatera	4 x 110 MW pump turbine or 4 x 125 MVA motor generator	490 MW pump turbine or 500 MVA motor generator	PT. PLN	Government	
Total					18 Units	1364 MW pump turbine or 4,720 MVA motor generator			

=== Wind ===
Power station	Location	District	Province	Region	Capacity per unit (MW)	Installed capacity (MW)	Operator	Sector	Remarks
Sidrap		Sidenreng	South Sulawesi	Sulawesi		75			
Jeneponto		Jeneponto	South Sulawesi	Sulawesi		72			

=== Solar ===
Power station	Location	District	Province	Region	Installed capacity (MW)	Operator	Sector	Remarks
Cirata floating solar	Cirata Dam	Sidenreng	West Java	Java-Bali	192			In development
Batam floating solar	Duriangkang Reservoir	Batam	Riau Islands	Sumatra	2200			In development
Silungkang solar plant	Wineru Village	North Minahasa	North Sulawesi	Sulawesi	21			

== See also ==
- Energy in Indonesia
- List of largest power stations in the world
