= Sentot Prawirodirdjo =

Javanese Muslim military commander

Raden Sentot Prawirodirdjo
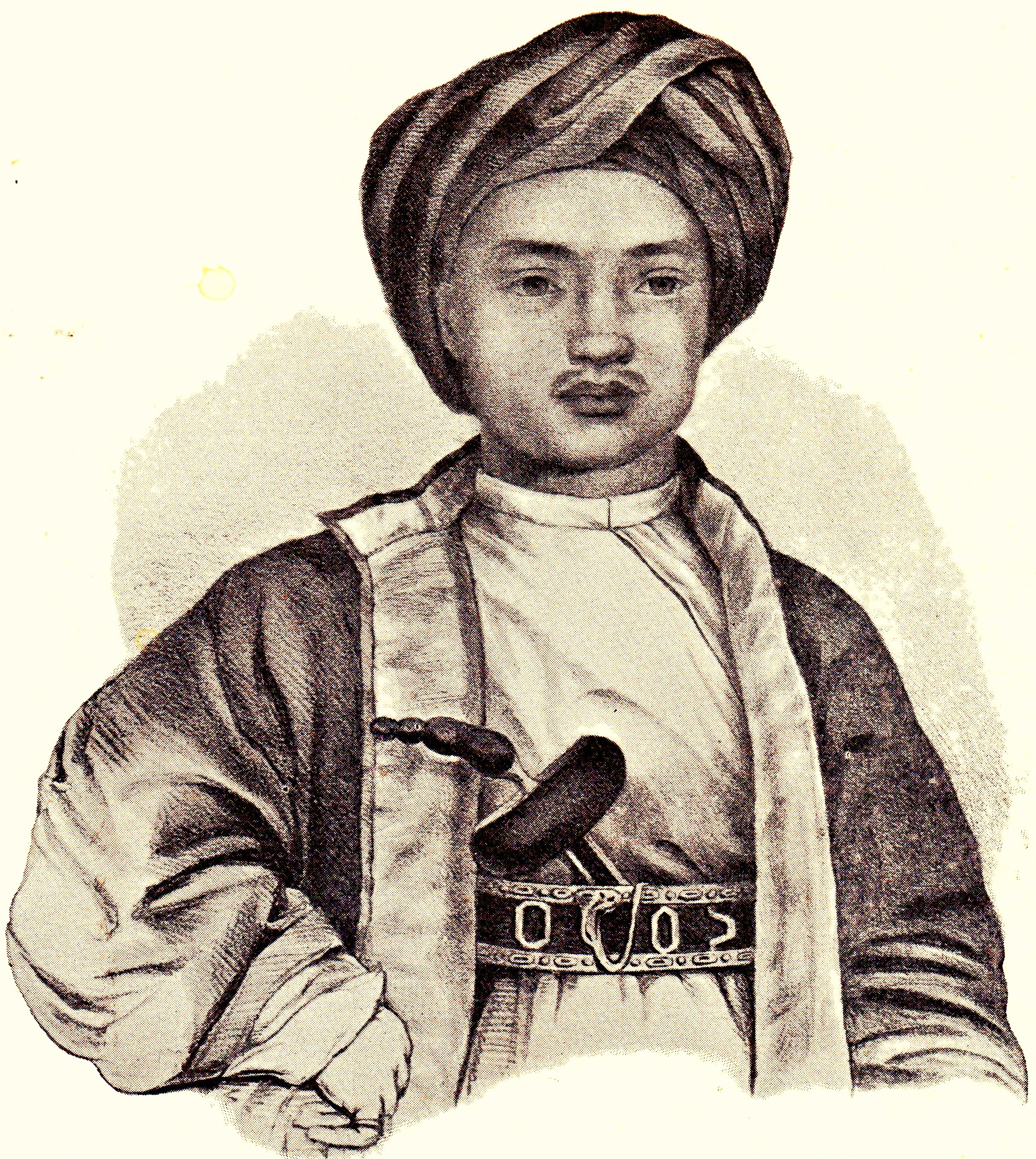
- Drawing c. 1900
- Born: 1808; Maospati, Yogyakarta Sultanate
- Died: 17 April 1855 (aged 46–47); Bengkulu, Dutch East Indies
- Children: Gusti Kanjeng Ratu Kencono/Gusti Kanjeng Ratu Wandhan
- Father: Raden Ronggo Prawirodirjo III

Ali Basah Abdul Mustapa Prawirodirdjo (1808 – 17 April 1855), also known as Sentot Ali Pasha or Sentot Prawirodirdjo, was a Javanese Muslim military commander during the Java War. He joined Diponegoro's rebel forces at the age of seventeen, and became a renowned commander in the war, and later became overall commander. He surrendered to the Dutch in October 1829. In Dutch service, Prawirodirdjo was given command of a Javanese unit under Dutch command during a 1832 Chinese riot in Purwakarta and then in the Padri War, when he was accused of collusion with Padri leaders. He was exiled to Bengkulu and died there.

== Early life ==
Prawirodirdjo was born in 1808 in Maospati to Rongga Prawirodirdjo III, the bupati of Madiun, through a concubine. Rongga was killed after initiating a revolt in 1810 against the colonial government of Herman Willem Daendels. His mother was likely Dayawati, Rongga's concubine who died in 1810. During Prawirodirdjo's childhood, Yogyakartan Prince Diponegoro made an effort to educate him as a santri, but this failed, as Prawirodirdjo showed a "violent dislike" for the education.

== Java war ==
Upon the outbreak of Diponegoro's rebellion in 1825, seventeen-year-old Prawirodirdjo joined his rebel forces. In the ensuing Java War, he was initially a cavalry commander of the rebels, and he gained "Sentot" (Javanese for "to dash", also spelled as "Senthot") as a nom de guerre. Diponegoro awarded him the title "Ali Basah" (derived from Ottoman "Ali Pasha", also spelled as "Alibasyah" or "Ali Basya"). He developed a tactic involving the camouflaging of his horsemen behind bamboo fences in order to ambush Dutch columns. Throughout early and mid 1826, Sentot and Diponegoro won a series of victories against the Dutch, including at Lengkong, Kejiwan, and Delanggu, before suffering a major defeat at the Battle of Gawok in October.

As the war transitioned into guerilla campaigns, Sentot led a series of ambushes against Dutch column, such as one in Kroya in 1828 which annihilated a full column. Dutch commanders experiencing these ambushes praised Sentot's battlefield command, with H. J. J. L. de Stuers describing him as a "young, fiery and in every respect a brilliant Javanese ... who knew how to blaze a trail for himself by virtue of his energy and shrewdness". According to Diponegoro's account, Sentot was frequently injured, having eight different horses he rode killed throughout the war. Throughout the war, Sentot and Diponegoro discussed the idea of conquering the Lesser Sunda Islands should they defeat the Dutch.

In December 1828, Diponegoro agreed to Sentot's request to take over overall military command, and also grant him the authority to levy taxes from rebel-controlled territories. The illiterate Sentot became overwhelmed with rebel finances and reports, and became slow to react to Dutch actions. In one case, this led to rebel defeat at the Battle of Nanggulon. As the rebel situation deteriorated, and food supplies for rebel troops became scarce, Sentot began to enter tentative talks with his Dutch counterparts. By late 1829, the rebels had lost much popular support, and after a major defeat at the Battle of Siluk in September 1829, Sentot became separated with Diponegoro and surrendered to the Dutch on 16 October 1829.

== Dutch service and exile ==
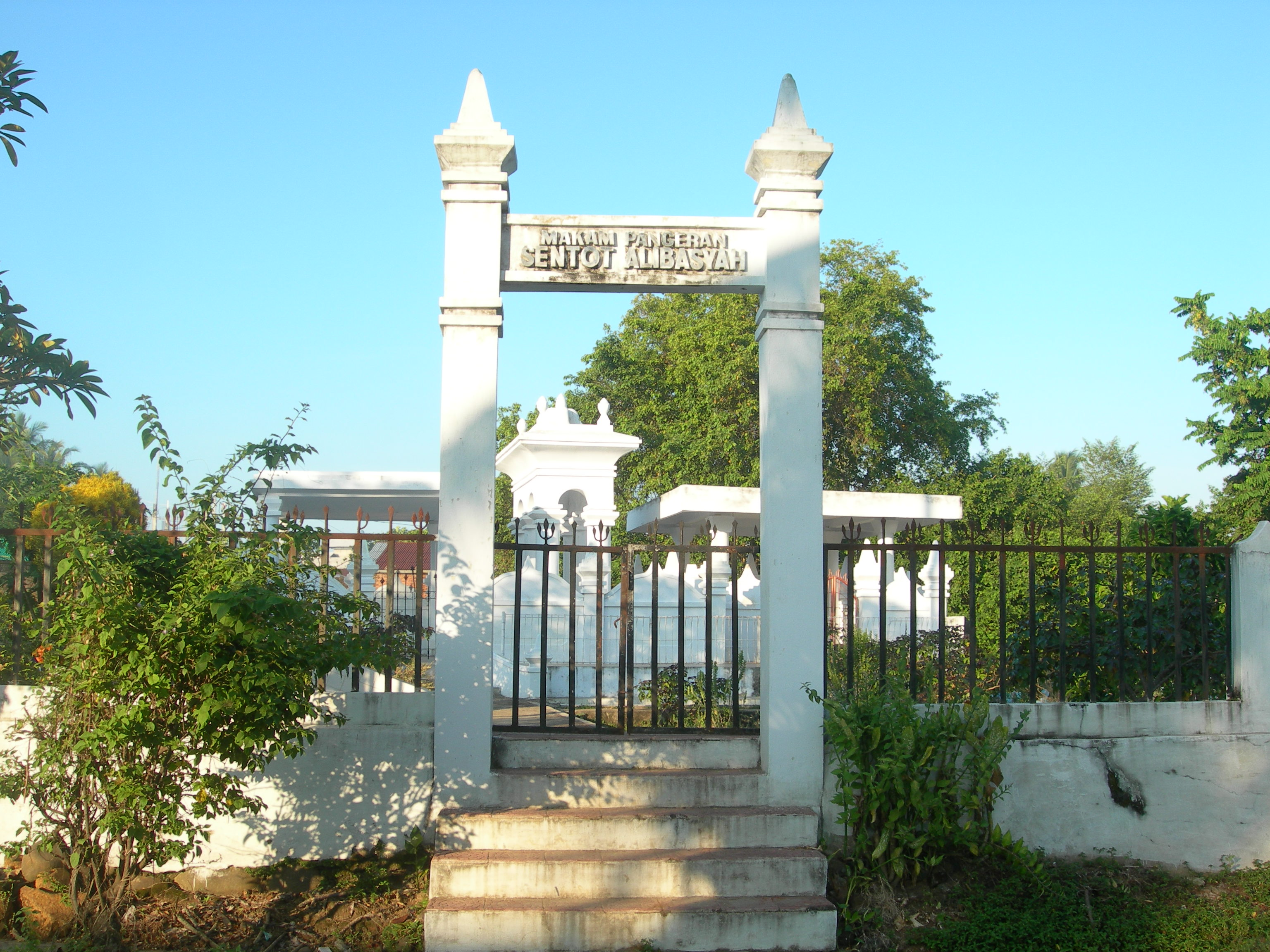
Sentot's grave in Bengkulu

After Sentot's surrender, he was given command of a native Javanese unit of 450 men, financed by the Dutch colonial government. The unit was deployed to Batavia in 1831 and saw action in suppressing a 1832 riot of Chinese migrants in Purwakarta, earning praise from Dutch commanders. During the crackdowns, Sentot's unit engaged a mob of 800 rioters and crushed the group. After the engagement, Sentot's unit reportedly beheaded 600 killed rioters and sent their heads to Batavia.

The unit was then sent to West Sumatra in 1833, to take part in the Padri War. Governor-General Johannes van den Bosch planned to create a Javanese-held principality in the Lintau region under Sentot to create a permanent auxiliary presence there. To this end, Sentot was provided with an appanage of around 5,000 people in Lintau. However, Sentot began colluding with the Minangkabau religious leaders, reportedly meeting in secret with Padri leader Tuanku Imam Bonjol. He also made trips to the Pagaruyung area outside of his jurisdiction, and broke protocol with Dutch officials in the region (addressing them as "brother" instead of "father").

Upon the outbreak of continued fighting in the Bonjol area, Sentot was blamed and arrested by the Dutch. He was removed from command, his unit later being absorbed by the KNIL. After being sent back to Batavia, Sentot was allowed to go on a hajj before he was exiled to Bengkulu, where he died on 17 April 1855. His grave is located in what is today downtown Bengkulu, surrounded by a public cemetery.
