= Purwakarta Chinese riot =

Date	8–10 May 1832
Location	Tanjungpura, Karawang, West Java

Belligerents
Chinese rioters	Dutch East Indies

Commanders and leaders
unknown	Sentot Prawirodirdjo

Strength
>1,000	1,300

Casualties and losses
c. 800 killed	Light

The Purwakarta Chinese riot (Indonesian: Kerusuhan Cina Purwakarta) was a riot of Chinese tea plantation workers in Tanjungpura, in Karawang Regency (today in Purwakarta) in May 1832.

== Prelude ==
In the nineteenth century, a large number of Chinese migrants coming through Macao worked at tea plantations in West Java, such as at a plantation at Wanayasa near Purwakarta. The Chinese workers had been dissatisfied with their working conditions, as their pay was frequently deducted or late. Some other Chinese migrants who intended to clear their own land also faced restrictions on the opening of new farmland. At the same time, the colonial government had been preparing new government buildings at the town of Purwakarta, which was slated to become the new capital of the Karawang Regency.

== Riots ==
After planning in secret, a large group of Chinese plantation workers started to riot on the evening of 8 May 1832, where they burned down a tea plantation company's buildings before marching towards the newly constructed government buildings in Purwakarta. The bupati (local native ruler) of Karawang, Raden Adipati Suriawinata, was forced to flee Karawang, along with the Dutch resident and the town's European population. In response, Dutch colonial authorities sent troops from neighboring areas such as Cianjur, Sumedang, and Bandung. The rioting and fighting in Purwakarta lasted until 9 May.

A further 1,000 soldiers were dispatched from Batavia to quell the riot, led by former Java War rebel commander Sentot Prawirodirdjo. The force encountered a rebel group after crossing the Citarum River. In an ensuing engagement, 600 rioters were reported killed by Sentot's force, with their heads later sent to Batavia. Another Dutch column approaching Purwakarta from the north also defeated a group of 400 to 500 rebels, killing around 200. Some surviving Chinese fled to the village of Wanayasa, which was populated by fellow migrant workers. Purwakarta was soon reoccupied by around 1,000 colonial troops.

== Aftermath ==
Among the dead were German naturalist Heinrich Christian Macklot, who was injured by the rioters early during the fighting and died on 12 May. A village in Karawang, Rancadarah (Sundanese for "Blood Marsh"), was named due to the large number of dead rioters at its site.
