= Battle of Lengkong (1826) =

Ambush by Javanese rebels in Indonesia

- Part of the Java War
Date	30 July 1826
Location	Lengkong (now Nglengkong), Yogyakarta Sultanate 7°40′45″S 110°17′32″E
Result	Rebel victory

Belligerents
Dutch East Indies; Yogyakarta Sultanate	Javanese rebels

Commanders and leaders
Lt. Haubert †	Sentot Prawirodirdjo

Strength
140	c. 2,000

Casualties and losses
125 killed or captured	Unknown

The Battle of Lengkong took place on 30 July 1826, between the forces of Javanese rebels under Prince Diponegoro and a column of soldiers from the Dutch colonial army and the Yogyakarta Sultanate. The rebels ambushed and destroyed the column, inflicted heavy casualties, and killed a number of Yogyakarta nobles who sided with the Dutch.

== Prelude ==
Throughout early 1826, after being forced to abandon the siege of Yogyakarta and being dislodged from their base at Selarong, Javanese rebel forces under Prince Diponegoro began to move north. Dutch forces under Hendrik Merkus de Kock launched a pursuit aimed to capture Diponegoro using three mobile columns of about 400 men each. By July 1826, Diponegoro had been forced to leave his new base at the village of Dekso, and move towards Mount Merapi's southern slopes. They defeated a pursuing Dutch column in a skirmish on 28 July.

== Battle ==
Pro-Dutch forces involved in the battle were a detachment moving from the former rebel base in Dekso back to Yogyakarta with Yogyakartan aristocrats, comprising 57 Dutch regular soldiers, eight hussars, 25 soldiers from the Yogyakarta keraton, and some 50 other members of the aristocrats' retinues. The rebel force encountered by the Dutch was reportedly 2,000 strong.

According to Diponegoro, the rebel force which attacked the column was not under his command during the battle. In his account, his commanders only realized that the Dutch forces contained Yogyakartan nobles after the order to attack had been given, and they were unable to order the rebels to withdraw. Diponegoro himself was only informed of the situation when his commander Sentot Prawirodirdjo rode away from the battle to inform him. Dutch writers found Diponegoro's account to be credible based on witnesses and interviews with rebels.

== Aftermath ==
After the battle, two of the Yogyakarta princes managed to escape, along with thirteen soldiers from the colonial army. The rest of the force was killed or captured, including the Dutch lieutenant Haubert in command of the column. Deaths among Yogyakarta's nobility included a guardian of the child Sultan Hamengkubuwono V, several senior members of the royal family, and three bupati. British historian Peter Carey described Lengkong as a battle where "the flower of the Yogyakarta nobility perished". Diponegoro continued his march north after burying the killed nobles, and defeated a larger Dutch force several days later.
