= Jatiluhur Dam =

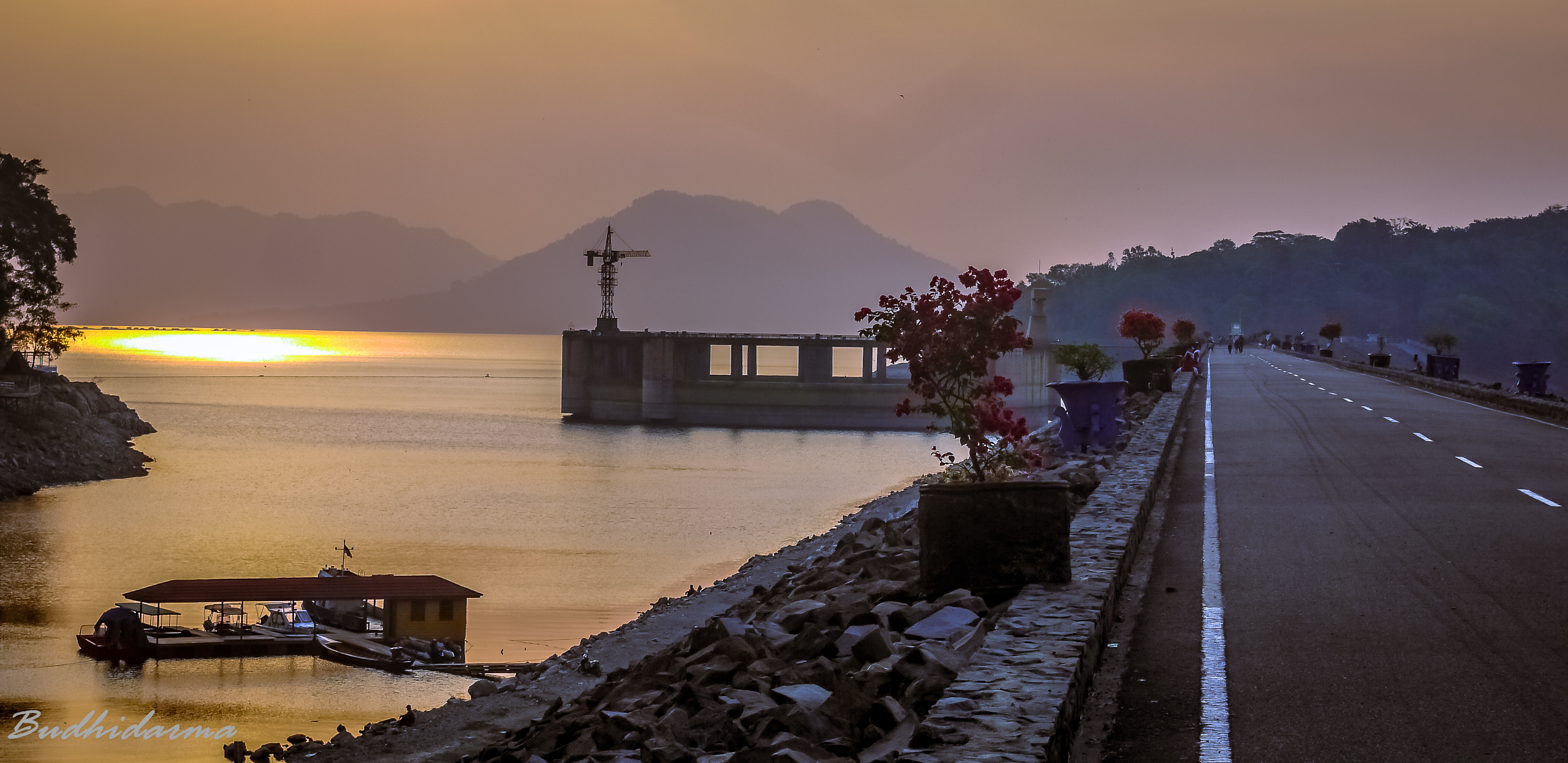

- Location within Indonesia
- Official name: Ir. H. Djuanda Dam
- Country: Indonesia
- Location: Purwakarta
- Coordinates: 6°31′25″S 107°23′18″E
- Status: Operational
- Construction began: 1957
- Opening date: 1965

Dam and spillways
- Type of dam: Embankment, earth-fill
- Impounds: Citarum River
- Height: 105 m (344 ft)
- Length: 1,200 m (3,937 ft)
- Elevation at crest: 114.5 m (376 ft)
- Width (crest): 10 m (33 ft)
- Width (base): 600 m (1,969 ft)
- Dam volume: 9,100,000 m^{3} (11,902,351 cu yd)
- Spillway type: Morning glory
- Spillway capacity: 3,000 m^{3}/s (105,944 cu ft/s)

Reservoir
- Total capacity: 3,000,000,000 m^{3} (2,432,140 acre⋅ft)
- Catchment area: 4,500 km^{2} (1,737 mi^{2})
- Surface area: 83 km^{2} (32 mi^{2})
- Normal elevation: 107 m (351 ft)

Power Station
- Operator: Perum Jasa Tirta II
- Commission date: 1967
- Hydraulic head: 80.2 m (263 ft) (max)
- Turbines: 6 x 32.3 MW Francis-type
- Installed capacity: 186.5 MW

The Jatiluhur Dam is a multi-purpose embankment dam on the Citarum River in West Java, Indonesia. It is located 70 km (43 mi) east of Jakarta, close to the medium-sized town of Purwakarta.

Jatiluhur Dam was designed by Coyne et Bellier and was constructed between 1957 and 1965 while the power station became operational in 1967. The dam serves several purposes including the provision of hydroelectric power generation, water supply, flood control, irrigation, and aquaculture. The power station has an installed capacity of 186.5 MW which feeds into the Java grid managed by the state-owned electricity company Perusahaan Listrik Negara. The Jatiluhur reservoir helps irrigate 240,000 ha (593,053 acres) of rice fields. The earth-fill dam is 105 m (344 ft) high and withholds a reservoir of 3,000,000,000 m^{3} (2,432,140 acre⋅ft), the largest in the country.

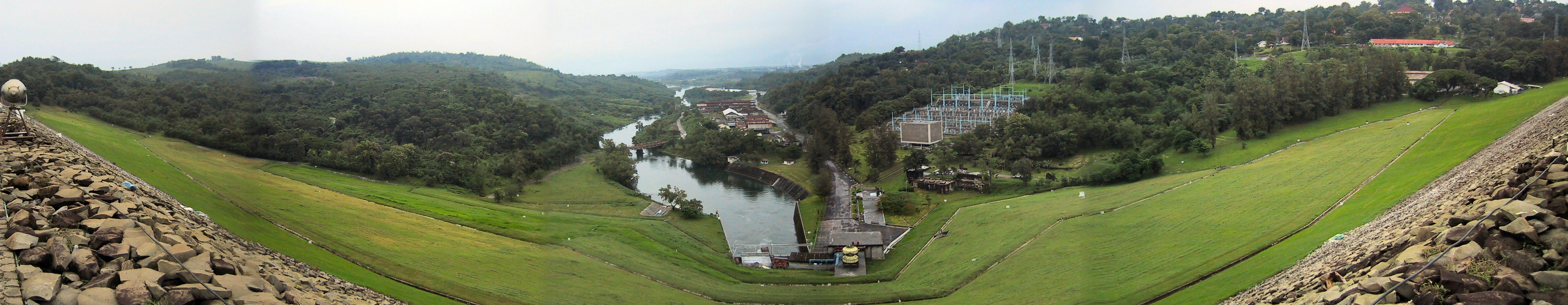
Downstream view of the dam from the crest looking towards the north.
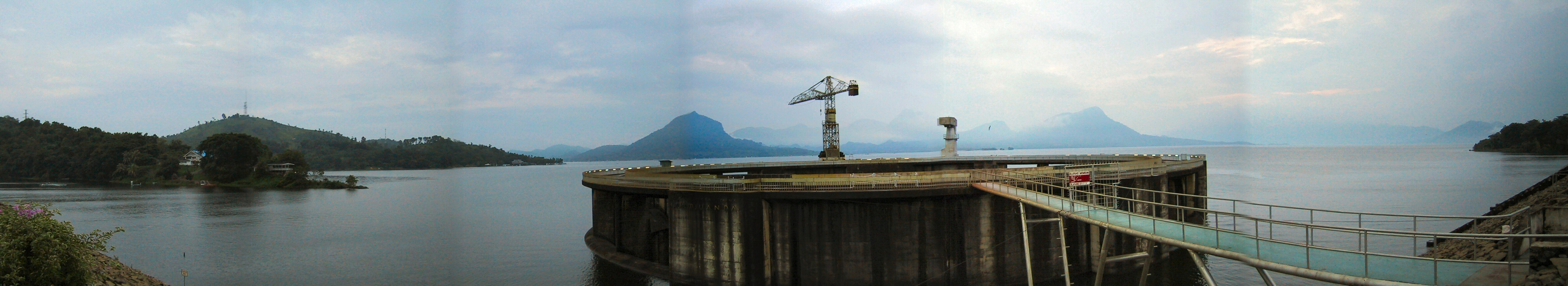
The dam's reservoir and morning glory looking towards the south and the spillway.

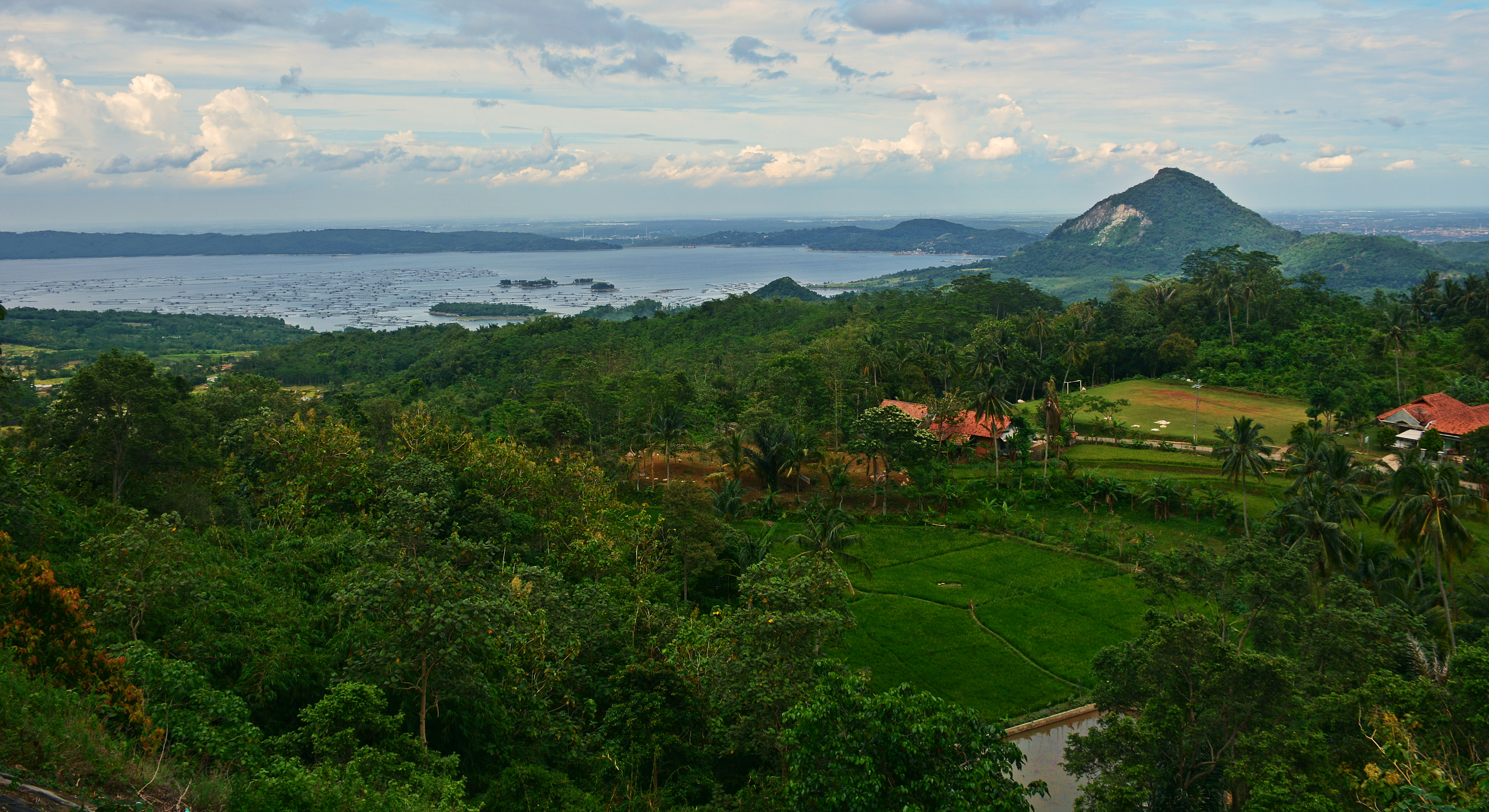
Jatiluhur viewed from Mount Parang

== See also ==
- List of power stations in Indonesia
- Cirata Dam
