= Darajat Power Station =

Geothermal power plant in Garut, Indonesia

Darajat Geothermal Power Plant Complex
- Country: Indonesia
- Location: Garut, West Java
- Coordinates: 07°13′3″S 107°44′21.8″E
- Status: Operational
- Commission date: 1994 (Unit 1); 2000 (Unit 2); 2007 (Unit 3)
- Operators: Indonesian Electricity Company (Unit I); Star Energy Geothermal Darajat II, Limited (Unit II & III)

Geothermal power station
- Type: Dry steam
- Min. source temp.: 240 °C (464 °F)
- Wells: 49

Power generation
- Units operational: 3
- Nameplate capacity: 271 MW: 1 × 55 MW (Unit 1); 1 × 95 MW (Unit 2); 1 × 121 MW (Unit 3)

The Darajat Geothermal Power Station is a field complex comprising 3 geothermal power plants situated in District Pasirwangi, Garut, West Java, roughly 150 kilometres (93 mi) south-east of Jakarta. The complex is in the Mt Kendang area, a volcanic region approximately 2 km above sea level. The field supplies dry steam, one of few such fields worldwide.

== Power Plant Information ==
In December 1984, the now-defunct Chevron-owned American Overseas Petroleum Ltd. (Amoseas) signed a contract with Pertamina and PLN to build geothermal power plants totaling 330 MW in capacity within a 56,650 hectare region in Darajat, West Java. Amoseas would provide the steam, while PLN would operate the plant; of the three existing plants, Chevron owned the two larger capacity plants, PLN owned only the first. The first such plant, rated at 55 MW, began operations in November 1994.

Construction of the second plant commenced in 1997, but the government suspended construction shortly afterwards, in 1998, because of a financial crisis. The plant, rated at 94 MW, began operations in April 2000.

The third plant, rated at 110 MW, began operations in 2007. This capacity was uprated to 121 MW in 2009.

In April 2017, Chevron's ownership of the plants were bought out by Star Energy Geothermal.
