= Soedirman Dam =

Dam in Central Java, Indonesia

Panglima Besar Soedirman Dam
- Interactive map of Panglima Besar Soedirman Dam
- Location: Banjarnegara Regency, Central Java, Indonesia
- Coordinates: 7.3923°S 109.6061°E
- Purpose: Hydroelectricity, irrigation, flood control, recreation
- Status: Operational
- Construction began: 1982
- Opening date: 1989

Dam and spillways
- Type of dam: Embankment, earth-fill
- Height: 110 m
- Length: 6.5 km

Reservoir
- Creates: Mrica Reservoir
- Total capacity: 157 million cubic meters
- Catchment area: 1,022 km²
- Surface area: 1,250 ha

Power Station
- Operator: PLN Indonesia Power
- Installed capacity: 184.5 MW
- Annual generation: 564 GWh

Panglima Besar Soedirman Dam, commonly known as Mrica Dam, is a large earth-fill embankment dam on the Serayu River in Banjarnegara Regency, Central Java, Indonesia. It was constructed between 1982 and 1988 and formally inaugurated in 1989 by President Soeharto. Named after Indonesian national hero Soedirman, the dam plays a vital role in regional energy and water management.

== Functions ==
The dam supports multiple purposes:

- Hydroelectric generation – supplies electricity to Java and Bali via the Panglima Besar Soedirman Power Plant.
- Irrigation – supports ~4,883 hectares of agricultural land.
- Flood control – reduces seasonal flood risk in the Serayu basin.
- Water supply and fisheries – provides clean water and supports inland aquaculture.
- Tourism and recreation – includes boating, camping, and a golf course. The first opening of the tourist site was held on 27th February, 2025, after being promoted by local tourist groups and social medias. The site started to attract people during the Eidl fitr holidays.

== History ==
Feasibility studies began in 1974, with initial designs proposed by Soviet engineers. However, geopolitical challenges and design standard issues led the project to be reassigned to a Swedish-British consortium. Construction included a pioneering bottom outlet for sediment flushing and emergency discharge — a first for Indonesian dams.

== Hydropower ==
Operated by PLN Indonesia Power, the hydroelectric station features:

- Installed capacity: 184.5 MW
- Annual generation: ~564 GWh

== Reservoir ==
Known as Mrica Reservoir, it has:

- Surface area: 1,250 hectares
- Catchment area: 1,022 km²
- Total capacity: 157 million cubic meters

== See also ==
- List of dams and reservoirs in Indonesia
- Banjarnegara Regency
- Soedirman
