= Cirata Dam =

Dam in West Java, Indonesia

- Location within Indonesia
- Country: Indonesia
- Location: Cadassari, Purwakarta
- Coordinates: 6°42′02″S 107°22′01″E
- Status: Operational
- Construction began: 1984
- Opening date: 1988

Dam and spillways
- Type of dam: Embankment, concrete-face rock-fill
- Impounds: Citarum River
- Height: 125 m (410 ft)
- Length: 453 m (1,486 ft)
- Dam volume: 3,900,000 m^{3} (5,101,007 cu yd)

Reservoir
- Total capacity: 2,165,000,000 m^{3} (1,755,194 acre⋅ft)
- Active capacity: 796,000,000 m^{3} (645,328 acre⋅ft)
- Catchment area: 4,119 km^{2} (1,590 mi^{2})
- Surface area: 62 km^{2} (24 mi^{2})

Cirata Power Station
- Coordinates: 6°40′52.19″S 107°20′48.48″E
- Operator: PT. PLN Nusantara Power
- Commission date: 1988–1998, Floating solar: 2023
- Type: Run-of-the-river
- Turbines: 8 x 126 MW Francis-type
- Installed capacity: 1,008 MW of Hydroelectricity + 192 MW of Floating solar

The Cirata Dam is an embankment dam on the Citarum River in West Java, Indonesia. It is located 100 km (62 mi) southeast of Jakarta. It was constructed between 1984 and 1988 for the primary purpose of hydroelectric & photovoltaic power generation. Other purposes include flood control, aquaculture, water supply and irrigation. The 125 m (410 ft) tall concrete-face rock-fill dam is situated just before a sharp bend in the river and withholds a reservoir with a gross storage capacity of 2,165,000,000 m^{3} (1,755,194 acre⋅ft). The reservoir has a surface area of 62 km^{2} (24 mi^{2}) which caused the relocation of 6,335 families. The construction of the dam resulted in involuntary resettlement of 56,000 people.

From bottom to top, Saguling dam (Green), Cirata dam (Blue), Jatiluhur dam (Orange). These reservoirs are all part of the Citarum watershed. The river flows from the Bandung Basin, passes through these reservoirs in order, and its main stream discharges into the sea west of the Bay of Jakarta.

== Hydroelectricity ==
The hydroelectric power station is located on the north side of the river bend and contains eight 126 MW Francis turbine-generators. It has a total installed capacity of 1,008 MW and an annual generation of 1,426 GWh. The power station was completed in two phases, the second was completed in 1998. It serves mostly as a peaking power plant and is the largest hydroelectric power station in Indonesia.

== Floating solar panels ==
On 9 November 2023, the floating solar panels that were built above the dam became operational. It has the capacity of 192 MW, making it the largest floating solar power plant in Southeast Asia.

The solar power plant alone is giving a contribution to the Net zero emissions of 245 Gigawatt-hours (GWh) of clean and renewable energy and reducing carbon emissions by 210,000 tons of CO_{2} annually.

== See also ==
- List of drainage basins of Indonesia
- List of power stations in Indonesia
- List of conventional hydroelectric power stations
- List of floating solar panels power plant
