= Battle of Nanggulon =

1828 battle in the Java War

- Part of the Java War
| Date | 28 December 1828 |
| Location | Nanggulon, Kulon Progo, Yogyakarta Sultanate 7°45′56″S 110°12′33″E |
| Result | Dutch victory |

Belligerents
| Dutch East Indies | Javanese rebels |

Commanders and leaders
| Maj. Bauer; Capt. H. V. van Ingen † | Sentot Prawirodirdjo |

Strength
| c. 400 | c. 1,500 (Dutch claim) |

Casualties and losses
| 38 killed/missing 14 wounded | Heavy |

The Battle of Nanggulon was an engagement in the Java War between the Dutch colonial forces and rebel forces of Prince Diponegoro, commanded by Sentot Prawirodirdjo, which took place on 28 December 1828. The rebel forces launched an attack on a Dutch detachment close to a newly constructed Dutch fortification, inflicting heavy casualties before being repulsed by another unit.

== Background ==
By late 1828, rebel forces in the Java War were being pushed back. The intensification of the Dutch field fortification strategy had reduced the rebels' area of influence, largely confined to the Bagelen region in the west of the Yogyakarta Sultanate. Around this time, Diponegoro's chief military commander Sentot Prawirodirdjo began taking on administrative duties following conflicts with civilian leaders. The Dutch began construction of a new fort at Nanggulon which threatened one of the rebels' line of communications, and Sentot was slow to react due to his preoccupation with civilian roles.

== Battle ==
The Nanggulon fort was capable of housing over 200 men, being one of the largest fortifications constructed in the war. Furthermore, around 400 soldiers supported the garrison, under the command of Major Bauer. On 28 December 1828, after receiving reports of an approaching rebel army of about 1,500 strong, Bauer ordered his subordinate, Captain Hermanus Folkert/Volkers van Ingen, to intercept the approaching army with a detachment which included Dutch infantry and cavalry, Javanese, Manadonese, and Madurese soldiers.

According to Bauer's account, van Ingen encountered a group of the rebels and ordered an attack. However, he failed to notice another group also approaching his detachment, and his unit was routed when the second group attacked. Van Ingen was killed during the fighting. The rest of Bauer's force caught up to the battle and caused the rebels to retreat. Dutch losses amounted to 38 soldiers killed, including van Ingen and Prince Prangwedana, a Yogyakartan prince aligned with the Dutch. A further fourteen men were injured. Rebel losses were heavy.

== Aftermath ==
Van Ingen was buried in a grave at Nanggulon, along with his dog who was also killed during the battle. His grave is now a designated cultural object.
