= Heinrich Christian Macklot =

German naturalist (1799-1832)

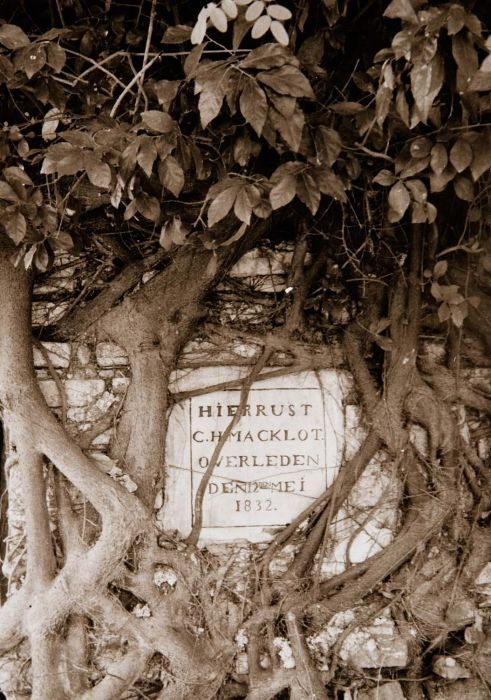
Tombstone of Macklot in Karawang.

Heinrich Christian Macklot (20 October 1799, Frankfurt am Main – 12 May 1832) was a German naturalist.

He studied medicine at the University of Heidelberg, earning his doctorate in 1822. Later that year, he found employment at the Rijksmuseum in Leyden. With Heinrich Boie and Salomon Müller, he was sent to Asia in order to collect specimens for the museum as part of the Natuurkundige Kommissie (Natural Science Commission). Macklot visited New Guinea and the island of Timor from 1828 to 1830 on board the HM corvette Triton. He was killed on 12 May 1832 during an insurrection that took place on the island of Java.

== Eponyms ==
In 1837, Coenraad Jacob Temminck named the Sunda fruit bat, Acerodon mackloti in his honor. Other zoological species and subspecies that bear his name are:

- Apalharpactes mackloti S. Müller, 1835 – Sumatran trogon
- Liasis mackloti A.M.C. Duméril & Bibron, 1844 – Macklot's python
- Pitta erythrogaster macklotii Temminck, 1834.

The botanical genus Macklottia was named after Macklot by Pieter Willem Korthals, it is synonymous with the genus Leptospermum.

== Publications ==
- Verslag van het land, de bewoners en voortbrengselen van eenige plaatsen op de kust van Nieuw Guinea, welke in den loop van het jaar 1828, door de Natuurkundige Kommissie in Oost-Indie, aan boord van Z.M. korvet Triton; Amsterdam : Bij de Erven H. Gartman, 1830 – Report of the country, the people and products of some places on the coast of New Guinea, during the course of the year 1828, by the Natuurkundige Kommissie in the East Indies, on board the HM corvette Triton. (in Dutch).
