= Wonorejo Dam =

Coordinates: 8.0200°S 111.8052°E

- Interactive map of Wonorejo Dam
- Country: Indonesia
- Location: Tulungagung, East Java
- Purpose: Multi purpose
- Status: Operational
- Construction began: June 1994
- Opening date: 2001
- Construction cost: ¥ 14,954 billion
- Built by: Dam: Kajima, Taisei, And Housing Development; Machining: Boma Bisma Indra
- Owner: Minister For Public Works and Human Settlements
- Operator: Jasa Tirta I

Dam and spillways
- Type of dam: Embankment
- Impounds: Gondang River
- Height: 100 m
- Length: 545 m
- Elevation at crest: 188 m
- Dam volume: 6.150.000 m³
- Spillways: 1
- Spillway type: Ogee aside
- Spillway length: 110 m
- Spillway capacity: 540 m³ / detik

Reservoir
- Creates: Wonorejo Reservoir
- Total capacity: 122.000.000 m³
- Active capacity: 106.000.000 m³
- Inactive capacity: 16.000.000 m³
- Catchment area: 126,3 km²
- Surface area: 3,85 km²

Wonorejo Hydroelectric Power Plant
- Operator: PLN Nusantara Power
- Type: Conventional
- Hydraulic head: 73,9 m
- Turbines: 1
- Installed capacity: 6,5 MW
- Annual generation: 31.700 MWh

Wonorejo Dam is a dam located at Pagerwojo district, Tulungagung Regency, East Java Province. This dam is located at the foot of Mount Wilis or about 12 kilometers from downtown Tulungagung. With a capacity of around 122 million cubic meters, this dam is also one of the largest dams in Indonesia. This dam was inaugurated on June 21, 2001, by the Vice President of Indonesia at that time, Megawati Sukarnoputri.

This dam was built on the Gondang River in Wonorejo Village using a loan from OECF of ¥ 14.954 billion.

As a result of sedimentation, in 2011, the total capacity of the reservoir formed as a result of the construction of this dam is estimated to remain at 107.2 million cubic meters, with an active capacity of 97 million cubic meters and an inactive capacity of 10.1 million cubic meters.

== Utilization ==
The water that is blocked by this dam is used to generate electricity through a hydropower plant with a capacity of 6.5 MW, as well as a source of drinking water of 8.02 cubic meters per second. The dammed water is also used to irrigate 7,540 hectares of agricultural land.

This dam also functions to prevent flooding in Tulungagung, together with Neyama Tunnel in Besuki District.

The Wonorejo Dam is now also one of the mainstay tourist attractions Tulungagung Regency, besides Popoh Beach. Several accommodation facilities have also been built around the Wonorejo Dam, one of which is the Swa-Loh Resort.
