= Paiton Power Station =

Power station in East Java, Indonesia

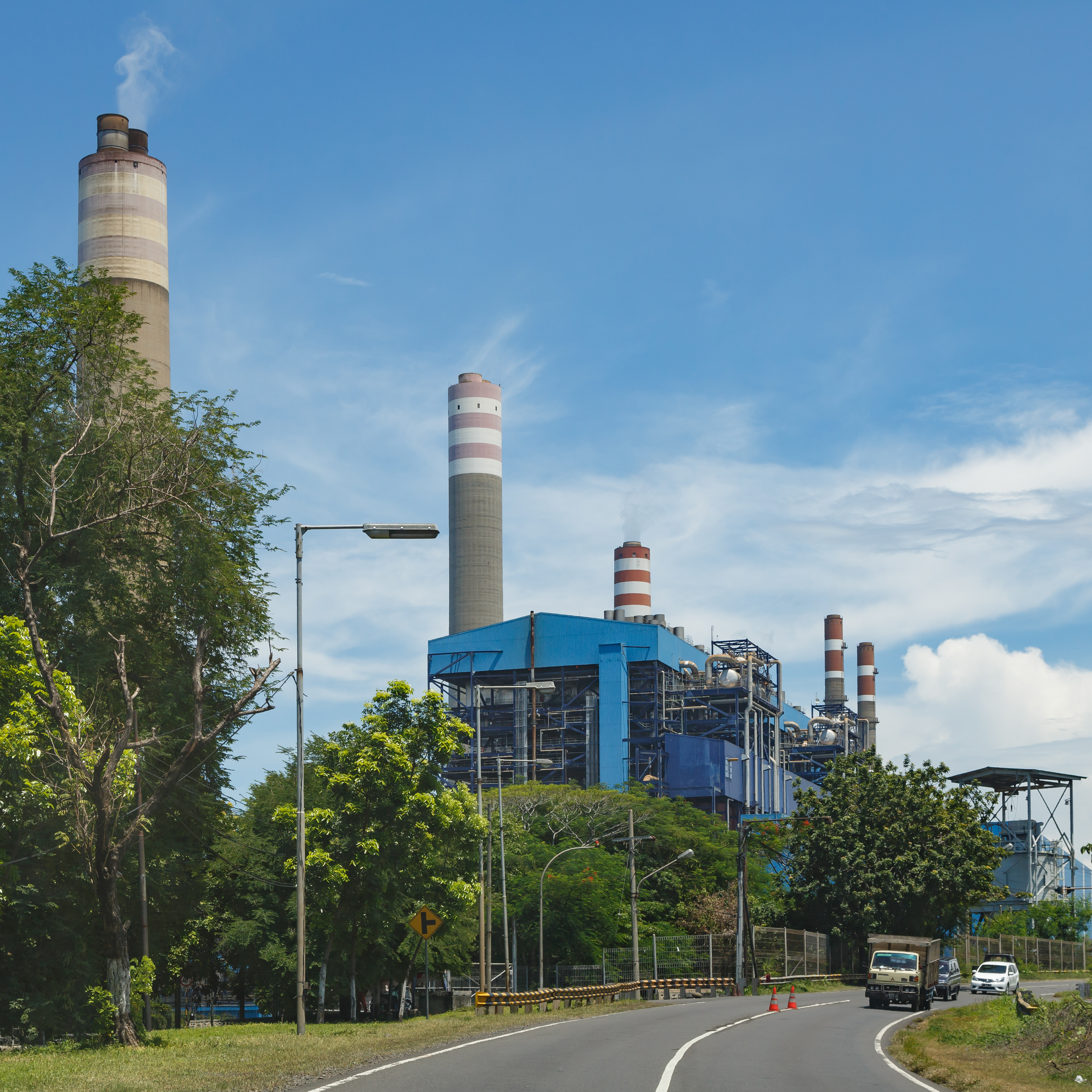
- Country: Indonesia
- Coordinates: 7°42′51″S 113°34′57″E
- Operators: PT. Jawa Power; PT. PJB; PT. POMI

Thermal power station
- Primary fuel: Coal
- Combined cycle?: Yes

Power generation
- Units operational: 2 x 400 MW, 2 x 610 MW, 2 x 615 MW, 1 x 800 MW, 1 x 660 MW
- Make and model: GE, Siemens, MHI, Harbin Electric
- Nameplate capacity: 4,710 MW
- Annual net output: 57,000 GWh

External links
- Website: www.jawapower.co.id

Paiton Power Station is a large thermal power station located around 35 km to the east of the town of Probolinggo in East Java in Indonesia, about halfway between Probolinggo and Situbondo. The extensive complex has a maximum generating capacity of 4,710 megawatts. It is the largest power station in Indonesia and the 10th largest coal-fired power station in the world.

== History of the plant ==
The history of the construction of the power complex, along with the financial arrangements, involved considerable controversy in the wake of the 1997-98 financial crisis in Indonesia.

The firm decision to begin construction of the complex was taken in April 1994 after negotiations which had commenced some years earlier. The construction of the Paiton complex was seen as important because it was part of an ambitious program announced in the mid 1990s in Indonesia to construct 27 power plants in cooperation with the private sector through IPP (Independent Power Producer) arrangements. But following the 1997-98 financial crisis in Indonesia, the IPP arrangements were widely regarded in Indonesia as inappropriate contracts which, as a result of faulty contract negotiations, had passed an excessive allocation of financial risk onto the Indonesian state.

According to the original contract signed between the Indonesian state-owned electric power company Perusahaan Listrik Negara (PLN) and PT Paiton, PLN was to pay PT Paiton a price of slightly over US 8 cents/kWh during the first 12 years of operation of the plant. However, following the dramatic plunge in the value of the rupiah during the 1997-98 crisis, PLN's financial situation deteriorated sharply (because many of the costs of the PLN were in $US while revenues were in rupiahs). In 1999, the PLN therefore moved to demand that the contract be renegotiated. After difficult negotiations, agreement was reached in mid-2002 for the PLN to pay PT Paiton a reduced price of slightly less than US 5 cents/kWh for part of the output from the Paiton complex.

More recently, the capacity of the plants at the site was extended. In 2004 it was announced by one of the firms operating at the complex, PT Paiton Energy, that an additional 800 MW (expected to cost around $US 850 million) would be added to the 1,290 MW capacity that the firm operated at the site. In 2007, PLN started construction of Paiton Unit 9 in cooperation with Harbin Power Engineering Company Limited (now known as Harbin Electric International Company limited). Unit 9 power plant, owned by PT PLN, is a sub-critical plant. In mid 2012, PT Paiton Energy (a joint venture between French and Japanese companies) launched the commercial operation of the unit (rated at 815 MW) adding around 5% to the capacity of the Java-Bali power grid.

== Ownership arrangements ==
The Paiton power generation complex is made up of a number of power generation units under different ownership. Details are as follows:

Paiton: ownership structure
	Capacity (MW)	Ownership
Units 1 & 2	2 x 400 = 800	PT Pembangkitan Jawa Bali
Units 3 & 4	800 (*)	PT Paiton Energy
Units 5 & 6	2 x 610 = 1,220	PT Jawa Power
Units 7 & 8	2 x 615 = 1,230	PT Paiton Energy
Unit 9	1 x 660 = 660	PT PLN
Total	4,710 MW	

(*) = The area for planned Units 3 & 4 is currently occupied by an 800 MW supercritical power station.

== Flue Gas Treatment ==
Paiton I and II both incorporate saltwater Flue Gas Desulphurisation scrubbers.

== See also ==
- Fossil fuel power plant
