= Jasa Tirta I =

Indonesian state owned water supply company

Coordinates: 7.965847°S 112.61845°E

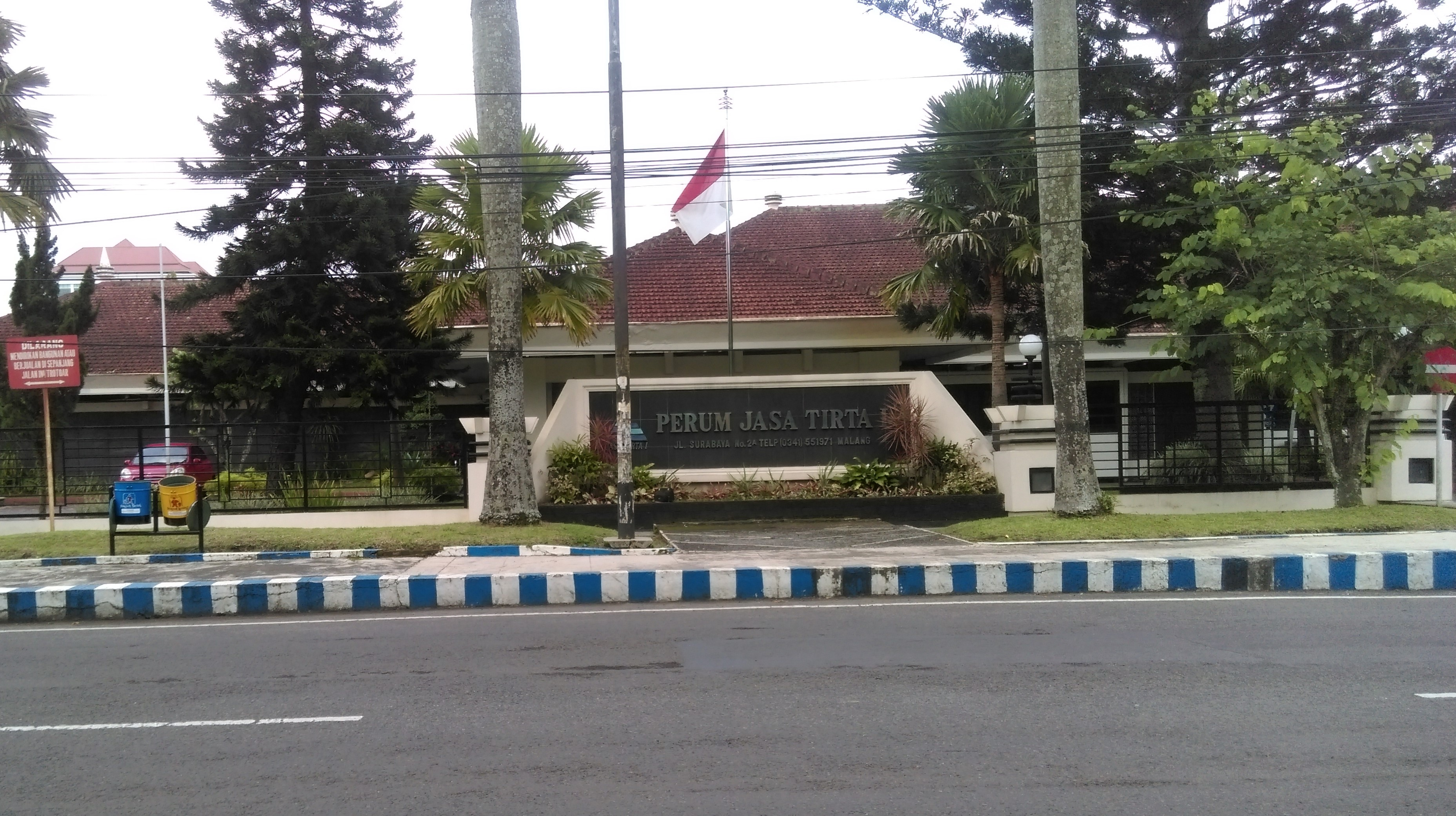
- Headquarters of Jasa Tirta I in Klojen, Malang
- Type: State-owned enterprise
- Industry: Water industry
- Founded: 12 February 1990; 36 years ago
- Founder: Sutami; Sedyatmo; Suryono
- Headquarters: Malang, Indonesia
- Area served: Indonesia
- Key people: Raymond Valiant Ruritan (Presiden Director)
- Owner: Government of Indonesia
- Website: jasatirta1.co.id

Jasa Tirta I is an Indonesian stated-owned water supply company based in Malang, East Java, Indonesia.

== History ==
Jasa Tirta Public Company (PJT) was initially established based on Government Regulation (PP) No. 5 of 1990 dated February 12, 1990 to implement part of the Government's duties and authorities in water and water resources management and irrigation infrastructure in the Brantas drainage basins includes 40 its tributaries.

The concept of establishing a state-owned enterprise that provides water services to finance maintenance of irrigation infrastructure is the result of the development of discourses from a number of water resources technocrats, such as Sutami, Suyono Sosrodarsono, Soeryono and Soenarno.

The release of PP No. 93 of 1999, Perum Jasa Tirta was changed to Perum Jasa Tirta I (PJT I). The management area has also increased to 25 rivers in the Bengawan Solo watershed region, through Presidential Decree No. 129 in 2000. To accommodate growing business activities as the company grows, improvements are made by changing Government Regulation No. 93 of 1999 through Government Regulation No. 46 of 2010.

The establishment of Presidential Decree No. 2 of 2014, Perum Jasa Tirta I was assigned by the government to also manage three drainage basins area (WS), namely Jeratun Seluna WS, Bogowonto Serayu WS and Toba Asahan WS. Thus the PJT I work area becomes five WSs namely Brantas WS, Bengawan Solo WS, Jeratun Seluna WS, Bogowonto Serayu WS and Toba Asahan WS.

== Branches ==
Jasa Tirta I has 5 operation areas, 1 in East Java, 3 in Central Java, and 1 in North Sumatera.

- Drainage basins of Brantas River, Malang
- Drainage basins of Bengawan Solo River, Surakarta
- Drainage basins of Jratunseluna (Jragung, Tuntang, Serang, Lusi, and Juana), Semarang
- Drainage basins of Serayu-Bogowonto, Purwokerto
- Drainage basins of Toba-Asahan, Toba Samosir Regency.

== See also ==
- Water industry
