= Battle of Kroya =

Battle of Kroyo
- Part of the Java War
Date	1 October 1828
Location	Kroyo, Purworejo, Yogyakarta Sultanate
Result	Rebel victory

Belligerents
Dutch East Indies	Javanese rebels

Commanders and leaders
Maj. Buschkens	Kerto Pengalasan

Strength
c. 250	c. 2,000 (Dutch claim)

Casualties and losses
151–161 killed	unknown

The Battle of Kroyo was an engagement of the Java War which took place on 1 October 1828 near the village of Kroyo in Purworejo, in modern Central Java. A Dutch column, pursuing a small group of Javanese rebels, encountered a much larger force than they had expected, and was destroyed in a later ambush.

== Prelude ==
In 1828, the Dutch intensified their construction of fortifications to deny rebel forces in the Java War territorial control. To defeat Diponegoro's army, Dutch command under Hendrik Merkus de Kock deployed eight mobile columns with a strength of around 500 men each. One of these columns, commanded by Major Buschkens, operated in the vicinity of the Bogowonto River west of Yogyakarta.

== Battle ==
On 30 September 1828, Buschkens' unit received information of a rebel force crossing the Bogowonto, and began pursuit. Initial Dutch reports suggested the rebels having 300 soldiers under Kerto Pengalasan; however, when Buschkens encountered them, they had grown to 2,000. Buschkens commanded a column of infantrymen, along with 80 cavalry. Upon encountering the rebel force, he found it to be too large, and initially refrained from attacking. He instead shadowed the enemy force and successfully prevented it from crossing another river. This continued until night. The following day, the rebel force moved upstream to ford at an unguarded crossing. Buschkens continued to follow the rebel force, unaware that they were leading him into an ambush near the village of Kroya.

When the two forces met, Buschkens ordered his cavalry to attack with the support of Yogyakartan troops in his column. The rebels sprung their trap then, appearing from cover to attack Buschkens' remaining infantrymen at the rear – native auxiliaries recruited from Sumenep and Tegal. These units were quickly routed, and Buschkens fled the battle with his cavalry unit. In his report to de Kock, Buschkens listed losses as between 151 and 161 dead, including 5 European soldiers. Most of Buschkens' losses were incurred from his rear infantry. He also mentioned that, aside from the cavalry which remained largely intact, only twelve infantrymen managed to rejoin him after the defeat.

== Aftermath ==
Despite the victory, the rebels' overall situation did not improve, and the Dutch continued to restrict the mobility of their forces through Bentengsteelsel.
