= Saguling Dam =

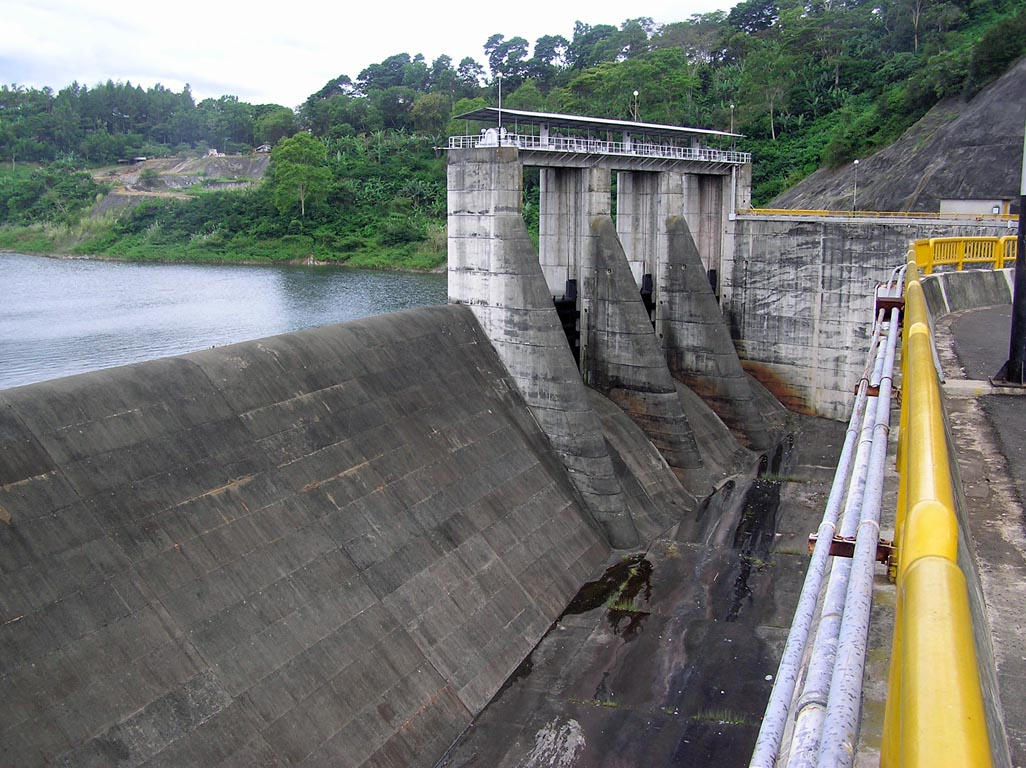
- The dam's spillway

- Location within Indonesia
- Country: Indonesia
- Location: Bandung
- Coordinates: 6°54′45″S 107°21′58″E
- Status: Operational
- Construction began: 1983
- Opening date: 1987

Dam and spillways
- Type of dam: Embankment, rock-fill with watertight core
- Impounds: Citarum River
- Height: 99 m (325 ft)
- Length: 301 m (988 ft)
- Elevation at crest: 650.5 m (2,134 ft)

Reservoir
- Total capacity: 2,750,000,000 m^{3} (2,229,461 acre⋅ft)
- Catchment area: 452 km^{2} (175 mi^{2})
- Surface area: 53 km^{2} (20 mi^{2})
- Maximum water depth: 92 m (302 ft)

Power Station
- Operator: PT Indonesia Power
- Commission date: 1986
- Turbines: 4 x 175 MW Francis-type
- Installed capacity: 700 MW

The Saguling Dam is an embankment dam on the headwater of Citarum River in West Java, Indonesia. It is located 26 km (16 mi) west of Bandung. Construction began in 1983. The reservoir had filled by 1985 and the first generator was operational in 1986. The primary purpose of the dam is hydroelectric power generation but it also provides for water supply and aquaculture. The 99 m (325 ft) tall dam is rock-fill embankment-type with watertight core that withholds a reservoir with a capacity of 2,750,000,000 m^{3} (2,229,461 acre⋅ft). Its power station has 4 x 175 MW Francis turbine generators with an installed capacity of 700 MW. Including land acquisition, the cost of the dam with power plant was about $US 663 million. The installed capacity of the power plant might be expanded to 1,400 MW in the future. The construction of the dam resulted in displacement of nearly 60,000 people.

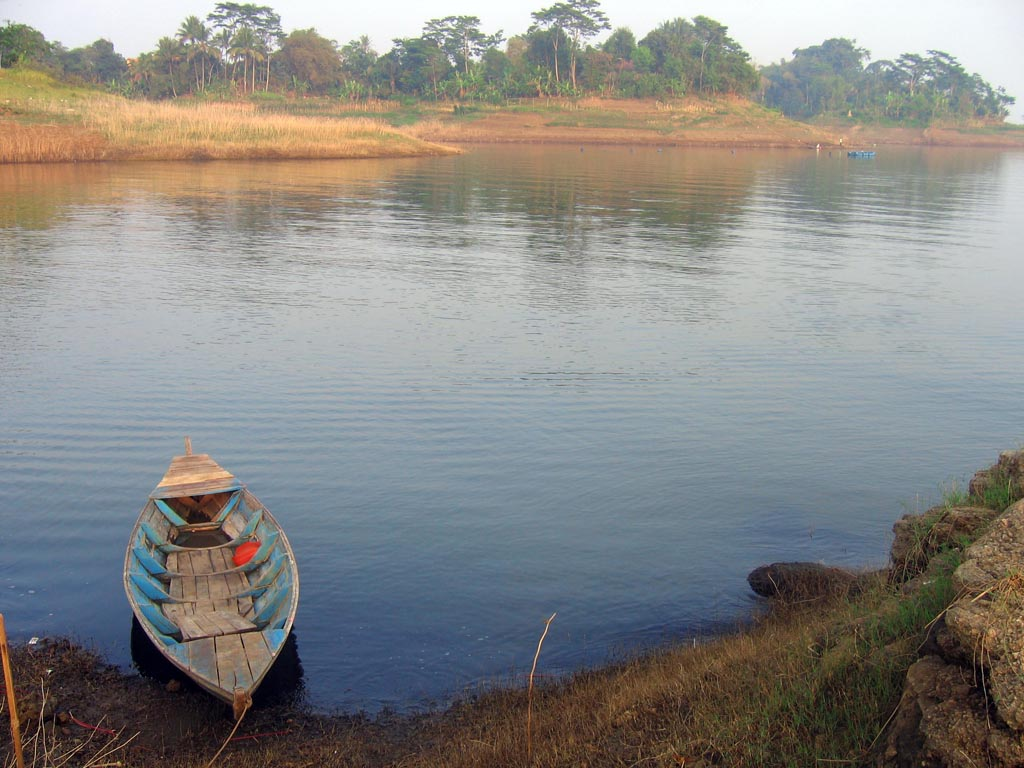
A view from Saguling lake.

== See also ==
- List of power stations in Indonesia
