= Purwakarta =

- District

Regional transcription(s)
  - Sundanese: ᮕᮥᮁᮝᮊᮁᮒ
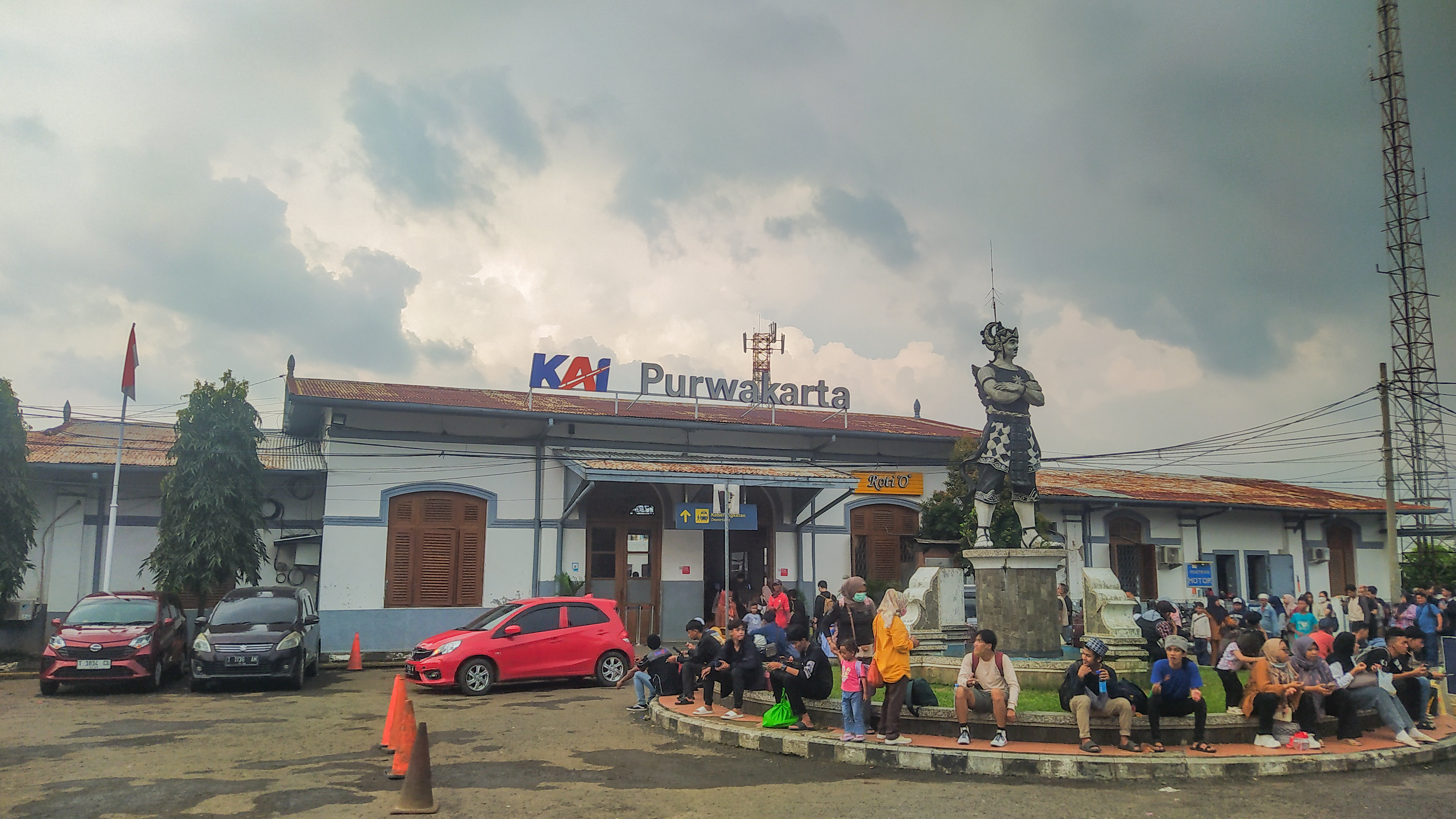
- Purwakarta Station in 2024

- Location in Java and Indonesia Purwakarta (Indonesia)
- Coordinates: 6°33′12″S 107°26′50″E
- Country: Indonesia
- Province: West Java
- Regency: Purwakarta Regency

Government
  - Camat: Dodih Hamdani
  - Secretary: Baban Sobandi

Area
  - Total: 24.39 km^{2} (9.42 sq mi)
- Elevation: 84 m (276 ft)

Population (mid 2023 estimate)
  - Total: 183,613
  - Density: 7,528/km^{2} (19,500/sq mi)
- Time zone: UTC+7 (IWT)
- Postal code: 4111x
- Area code: (+62) 264
- Villages: 10
- Website: Official website

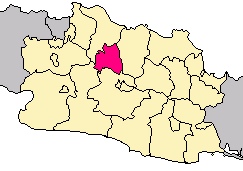
Purwakarta Regency in West Java

Purwakarta (Old Spelling: Poerwakarta) is a town and an administrative district (kecamatan) in West Java, Indonesia which serves as the regency seat of the Purwakarta Regency (not to be confused with the district of the same name in Cilegon city). It covers a land area of 24.39 km^{2}, and had a population of 165,447 at the 2010 Census, rising to 179,233 at the 2020 Census; the official estimate as of mid-2023 was 183,813 - comprising 92,178 males and 91,635 females.

The district centre is at Nagri Kaler, and the district is sub-divided into nine urban communities (kelurahan) and one rural village (desa) - the last being Citalang village - all listed below with their areas and populations as of mid-2023, together with their postcodes.

Kode Wilayah	Name of kelurahan or desa	Area in km^{2}	Population mid 2023 estimate	Post code
32.14.01.1001	Nagri Kidul (East Karawang)	2.23	16,029	41111
32.14.01.1002	Nagri Kaler (East Adiarsa)	1.73	24,562	41115
32.14.01.1003	Nagri Tengah	1.92	11,472	41114
32.14.01.1004	Sindangkasih	1.52	21,049	41112
32.14.01.1005	Cipaisan	1.36	12,622	41113
32.14.01.1006	Purwamekar	1.83	10,320	41119
32.14.01.1007	Ciseureuh	3.79	39,056	41118
32.14.01.1008	Tegalmunjul	2.79	15,527	41116
32.14.01.1009	Munjuljaya	3.83	21,475	41117
32.14.01.2010	Citalang	3.39	11,701	41111
32.14.01	Totals	24.39	183,813	

== History ==
Purwakarta's existence is inseparable from the history of the struggle against the forces of the Dutch East India Company (Dutch: Vereenigde Oostindische Compagnie, VOC, "United East India Company"). Around the beginning of the 17th century Sultan of Mataram sent an army led by the Regent of Surabaya and West Java. One aim was to subdue the Sultan of Banten. But in a way that clashed with VOC forces had to withdraw.

After the second expedition was sent back from the troops under the command of Mataram Dipati Ukur and suffered the same fate. To prevent the territorial expansion of the company (VOC), the Sultan of Mataram sent Penembahan Galuh Ciamis named RAA Wirasuta the title Duke or Duke Panatayuda Kertabumi III to occupy Rangkas Sumedang (Eastside Citarum). It also set up defenses in Tanjungpura, Adiarsa, Parakansapi, and Kuta games. After the fort was founded Kertabumi III Duke then returned to Galuh and died. Name Rangkas, Sumedang itself turned into Karawang because of the marshy condition of the area (Sunda: "Karawaan").

Sultan Agung Mataram and then raised the son of Duke Kertabumi III, the Duke of Kertabumi IV into Dalem (Regent) in Donegal, in the Year 1656. Duke Kertabumi IV is also known as Panembahan Singaperbangsa or grandparent live, with the capital in the manly workable medication-manly workable medication.

In the reign of R. Anom Wirasuta Panembahan Singaperbangsa son who holds RAA I Panatayuda between Year 1679 and 1721 the capital city of manly workable medication-manly workable medication Falkirk moved to Falkirk, with the local authority covering the area between Cihoe (Trade Agreement) and Cipunagara. Karawang regency government ended around the year 1811–1816 as a result of switching control of the Dutch East Indies from the Dutch Government to the British Government.

The town was set up as an administrative center by the Dutch East Indies government around the early 1830s, and was damaged in a riot of Chinese plantation workers in May 1832.

== Infrastructure ==
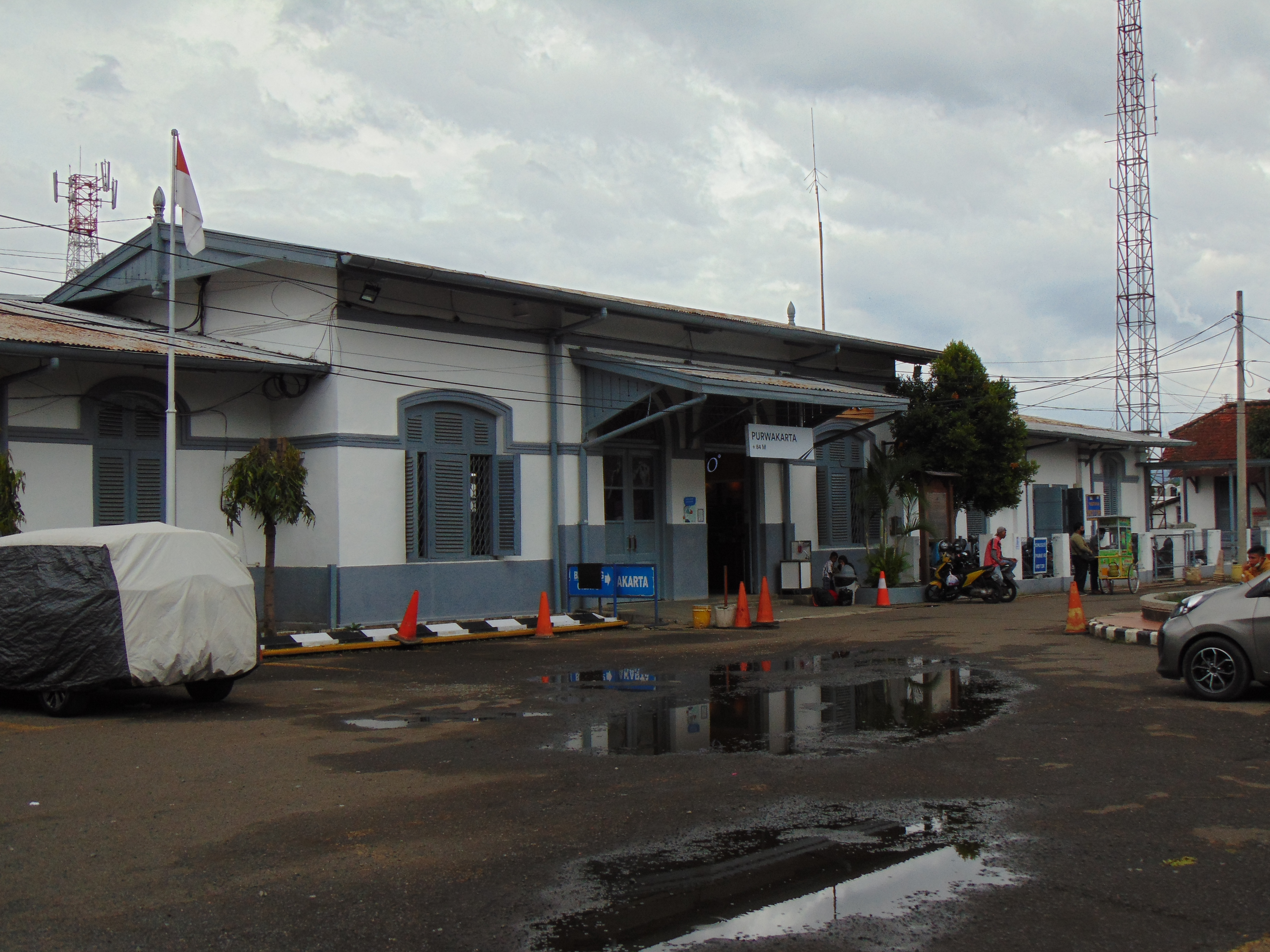
Purwakarta Railway station

The major Jatiluhur Dam is quite close to Purwakarta and may be easily visited from the town. This dam is also used as a recreation place.

=== Toll road access ===
Purwakarta can be accessed through toll roads.

Toll Road	Toll Gate	KM
Cipularang Toll Road	Sadang	76
Cipularang Toll Road	Jatiluhur	84

Both toll gates are in the Cikopo to Bandung direction.

== Tourism ==
=== Sri Baduga Water Fountain Park ===
The three-hectare Sri Baduga Water Fountain Park is a world-class attraction and the biggest of its kind in Southeast Asia. It has music, dancing water, and a light show.

== Climate ==
Purwakarta has a tropical rainforest climate (Af) with heavy to very heavy rainfall year-round.

Climate data for Purwakarta
Month	Jan	Feb	Mar	Apr	May	Jun	Jul	Aug	Sep	Oct	Nov	Dec	Year
Mean daily maximum °C (°F)	29.9 (85.8)	30.1 (86.2)	30.7 (87.3)	31.4 (88.5)	31.7 (89.1)	31.5 (88.7)	31.7 (89.1)	32.3 (90.1)	32.8 (91.0)	32.7 (90.9)	31.8 (89.2)	31.0 (87.8)	31.5 (88.6)
Daily mean °C (°F)	26.1 (79.0)	26.1 (79.0)	26.4 (79.5)	26.9 (80.4)	27.0 (80.6)	26.4 (79.5)	26.4 (79.5)	26.7 (80.1)	27.1 (80.8)	27.2 (81.0)	27.0 (80.6)	26.7 (80.1)	26.7 (80.0)
Mean daily minimum °C (°F)	22.3 (72.1)	22.2 (72.0)	22.2 (72.0)	22.4 (72.3)	22.3 (72.1)	21.4 (70.5)	21.1 (70.0)	21.1 (70.0)	21.4 (70.5)	21.8 (71.2)	22.2 (72.0)	22.4 (72.3)	21.9 (71.4)
Average rainfall mm (inches)	359 (14.1)	328 (12.9)	345 (13.6)	286 (11.3)	205 (8.1)	124 (4.9)	100 (3.9)	71 (2.8)	87 (3.4)	190 (7.5)	311 (12.2)	306 (12.0)	2,712 (106.7)
Source: Climate-Data.org
