= Battle of Kejiwan =

1826 battle of the Java War

- Part of the Java War
Date	9 August 1826
Location	Kejiwan, Yogyakarta Sultanate
Result	Javanese victory

Belligerents
Javanese rebels	Dutch East Indies; Mangkunegaran

Commanders and leaders
Diponegoro	Bernard Sollewijn

Strength
3,000 (Dutch claim)	390

Casualties and losses
Unknown	150 killed 7 guns captured

The Battle of Kejiwan took place on 9 August 1826 during the Java War between rebel forces under Prince Diponegoro and a flying column of Dutch colonial and Mangkunegaran troops. The flying column, which had been pursuing Diponegoro during his march north, was defeated in a pitched battle, allowing Diponegoro to continue his march.

== Background ==
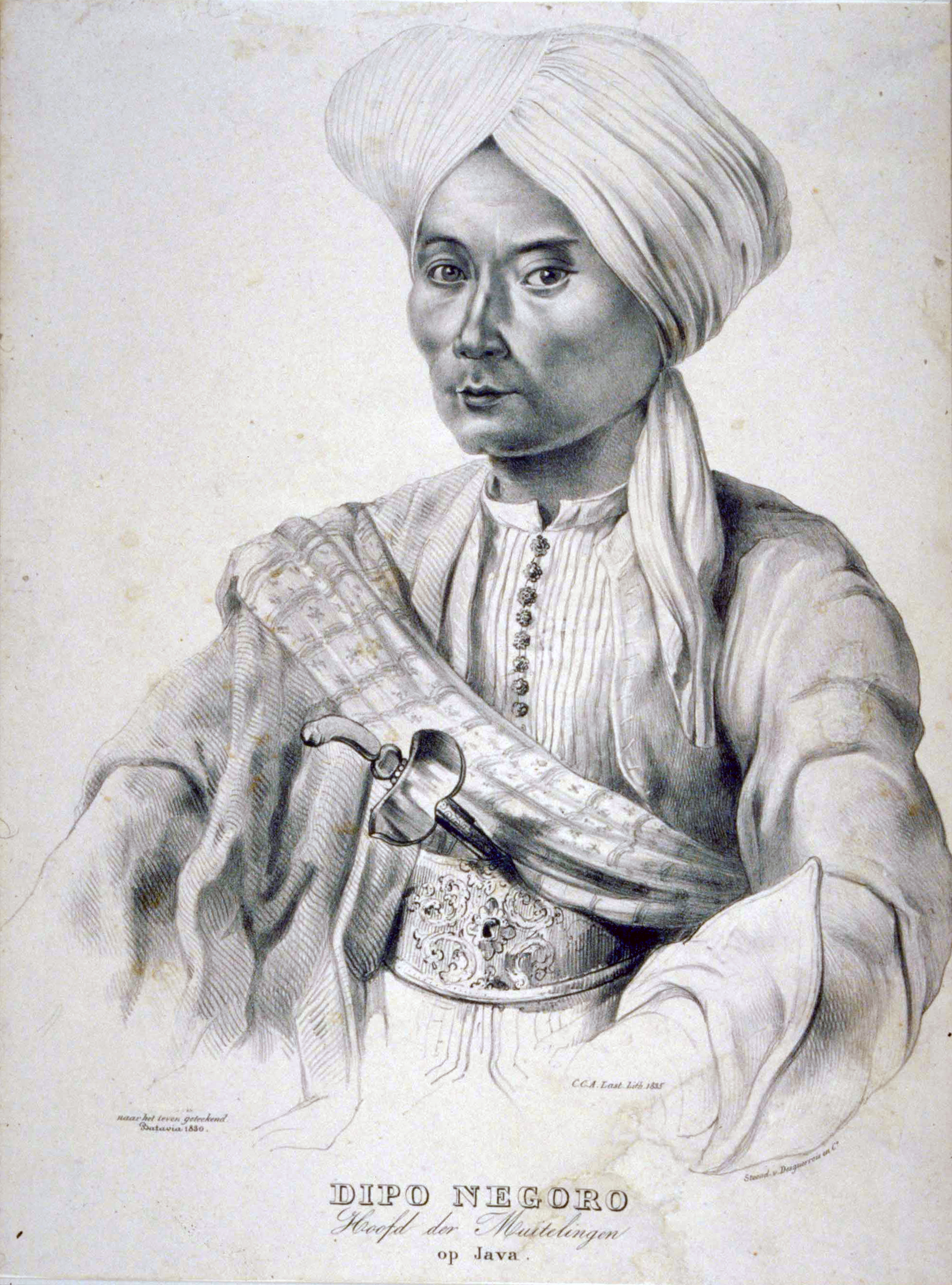
1835 portrait of Diponegoro

Throughout early 1826, after being forced to abandon the siege of Yogyakarta and being dislodged from their base at Selarong, Javanese rebels under Prince Diponegoro began to move north. The Royal Netherlands East Indies Army (KNIL), under Hendrik Merkus de Kock, launched a pursuit to capture Diponegoro, using three flying columns of approximately 400 men each, consisting of a mixture of Dutch and native troops. After a series of skirmishes, one of the columns reached Diponegoro's forces at the southern slopes of Mount Merapi in early August.

== Battle ==
The Dutch column involved in the battle, commanded by Major Bernard Sollewijn, consisted of 100 KNIL troops (70 of whom were European and the rest native), 200 Mangkunegaran soldiers, 50 Madurese fighters and 40 djajeng-sekar (colonial police). The column was equipped with several artillery pieces and mortars, and had received intelligence on 7 August that Diponegoro's forces had withdrawn further north; the column's commanders did not attempt further reconnaissance. Dutch sources claimed that Diponegoro commanded 3,000 rebels during the battle.

On 9 August, shortly after departing the village of Kejiwan (in the modern-day Sleman Regency), Sollewijn's column encountered Diponegoro's forces on the opposite side of a ravine. After a brief exchange of fire, Sollewijn's men charged across the ravine and initially forced Diponegoro's cavalry to retreat. However, Diponegoro's left wing flanked around Sollewijn's men and attacked the Mangkunegaran troops, causing a rout which quickly spread across the whole column. Sollewijn's forces were forced back into the ravine and became surrounded, with a small detachment managing to break out of the ravine and escape.

== Aftermath ==
Several surviving members of Sollewijn's column, including Sollewijn himself, managed to regroup with another Dutch column, which broke off their pursuit of Diponegoro upon hearing of the defeat. Dutch records claimed 150 members of Sollewijn's column were killed, including 14 European and 12 native KNIL soldiers, 112 Mangkunegaran troops and 14 Madurese fighters and djajeng-sekar. The defeat suffered by Sollewijn's column caused a brief panic among the Dutch high command, which for a time considered moving their headquarters north to Semarang, away from Diponegoro's forces. This did not happen, and instead the Dutch recalled 1,500 troops deployed outside Java to replace their losses.

Diponegoro's men captured a number of Dutch artillery pieces and horses, along with enough firearms and ammunition to equip 150 infantrymen. His victory enabled him to continue his movement northwards to link up with another rebel army under Kyai Maja after capturing the town of Delanggu. A 1979 painting depicting the battle by Sindudarsono Sudjojono, Pasukan Kita yang Dipimpin Pangeran Diponegoro ("Our Soldiers under Prince Diponegoro"), was sold in 2014 for HK$58.36 million (US$7.53 million), which at the time, was the most ever paid for a work by an Indonesian painter. As of 2024, it is the second-most expensive Indonesian painting, behind Perburuan Banteng by Raden Saleh.
