= Citarum River =

River in Java, Indonesia

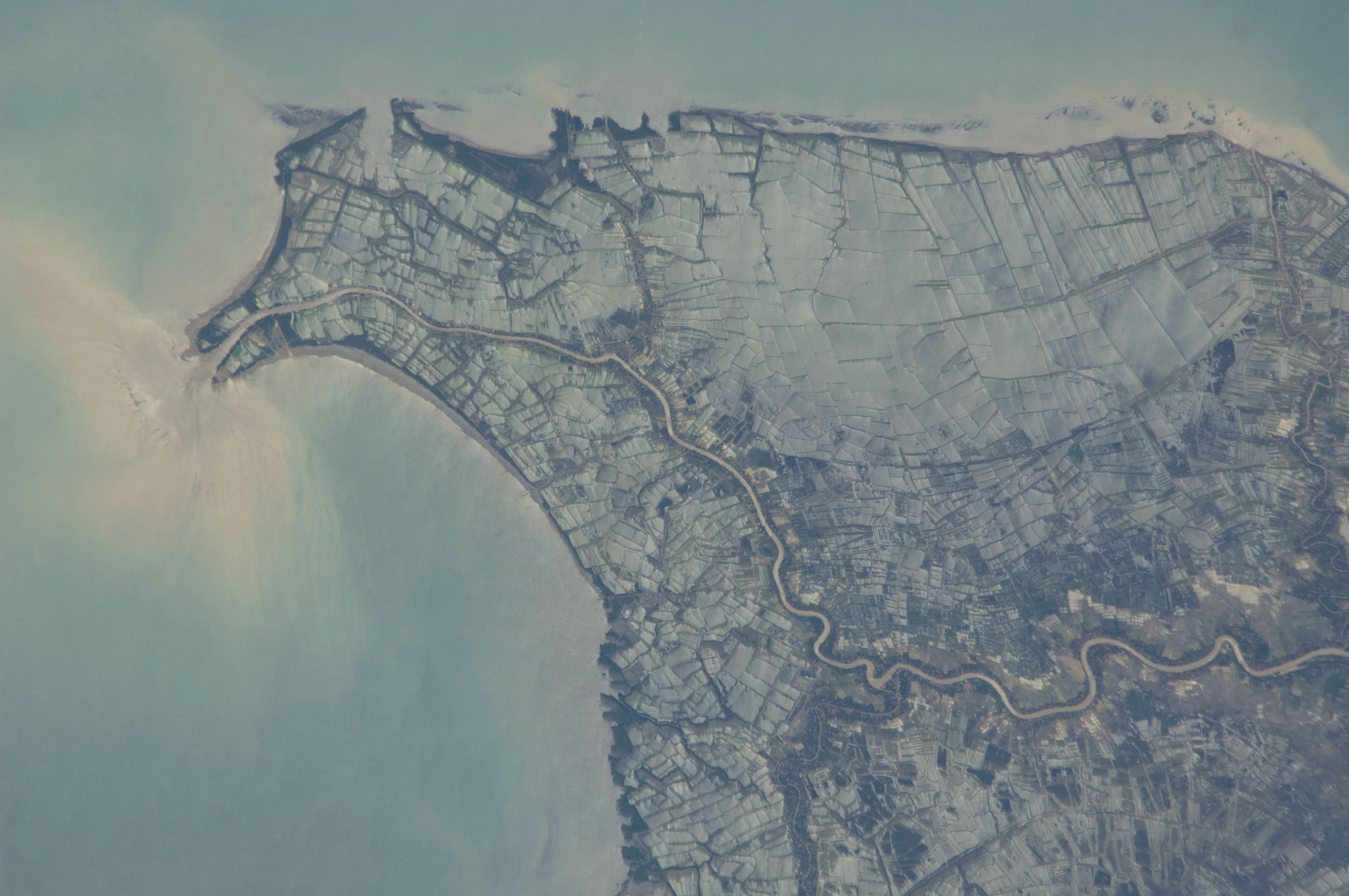
- Estuary of the Tarum river, with mangrove forests at its mouth
- Native name: ᮝᮜᮥᮍᮔ᮪ ᮎᮤᮒᮛᮥᮙ᮪ (Sundanese)

Location
- Country: Indonesia
- State: West Java

Physical characteristics
- Source: Situ Cisanti; Mt. Wayang; Mt. Kendang
  - location: Tarumajaya, Bandung Regency, West Java
  - elevation: 1,600 m (5,200 ft)
- Mouth: Jakarta Bay; Java Sea
  - location: Muaragembong, Bekasi Regency, West Java
  - coordinates: 5.941306°S 106.987722°E
- Length: 270 km (170 mi)
- Basin size: 6,906 km^{2} (2,666 sq mi)
- Discharge
  - location: Near mouth
  - average: 423 m^{3}/s (14,900 cu ft/s)

Basin features
- River system: Citarum basin (DAS220047)
- Waterbodies: Jatiluhur dam; Cirata dam; Saguling dam
- Basin management: BPDAS Citarum-Ciliwung

The Citarum River (more correctly called the Tarum River, as the prefix "Ci" simply means "river") (Sundanese: Walungan Citarum) is the longest and largest river in West Java, Indonesia. It is the third longest river in Java, after Bengawan Solo and Brantas. It plays an important role in the life of the people of West Java. It is considered one of the most polluted rivers in the world.

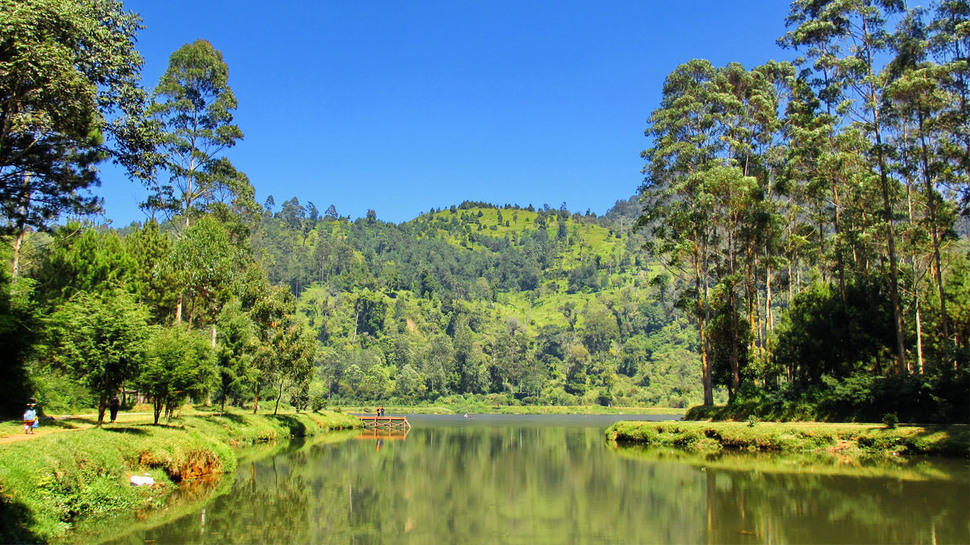
Cisanti Lake, Km 0 Citarum river

== History ==
In Indonesian history, the Citarum is linked with the 4th-century Tarumanagara kingdom, as the kingdom and the river shared the same etymology, derived from the word "tarum" (Sundanese for indigo plant). The earlier 4th-century BCE prehistoric Buni clay pottery-making culture flourished near the river's mouth. Stone inscriptions, Chinese sources, and archaeological sites such as Batujaya and Cibuaya suggest that human habitation and civilization flourished in and around the river estuaries and river valleys as early as the 4th century and even earlier.

== Geography ==
The river flows in the northwest area of Java with a predominantly tropical monsoon climate. The annual average temperature in the area is 24 °C. The warmest month is April, when the average temperature is around 26 °C, and the coldest is January, at 22 °C. The average annual rainfall is 2646 mm. The wettest month is January, with an average of 668 mm of rainfall, and the driest month is September, with 14 mm of rainfall.

== Hydroelectric and irrigation dams ==
Three hydroelectric powerplant dams are installed along the Citarum: Saguling, Cirata, and Ir. H. Djuanda (Jatiluhur), all supplying the electricity for the Bandung and Greater Jakarta areas. The waters from these dams are also used to irrigate vast rice paddies in Karawang and Bekasi areas, making northern West Java lowlands one of the most productive rice farming areas.

The Jatiluhur Dam with a 3 billion cubic metres storage capacity provides the largest reservoir in Indonesia. It forms a fresh-water lake with a surface area of 83 km^{2}.

The river makes up around 80 percent of the surface water available to the people who use it. Pollution has affected agriculture so much that farmers have sold their rice paddies for half their normal price.

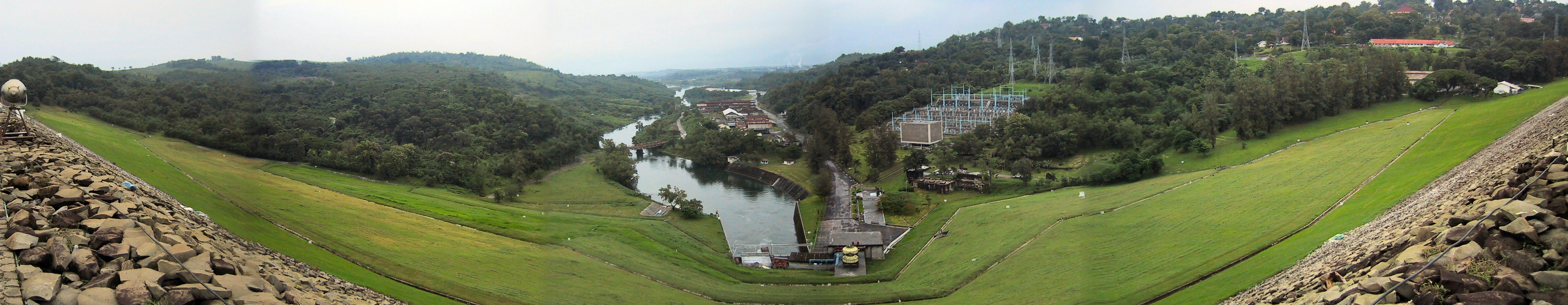

== Pollution ==
The river is heavily polluted by human activity; about five million people live in its basin (the drainage area covers 6,929 km^{2}). Textile factories in Bandung and Cimahi were major toxic waste contributors. More than 2,000 industries contaminate 5,020 sq miles of the river with lead, mercury, arsenic, and other toxins. According to the documentary Green Warriors Indonesia by Martin Boudot, some of the other toxins include sulphites, nonylphenol, Phthalates, PCB 180, paranitrophenol, tributylphosphate. The documentary also mentions that the most dangerous pollution comes from the Indonesian textile industry (with many textile factories being part of Asosiasi Pertekstilan Indonesia). It is also mentioned that the textile factory effluents are only tested on a very select number of parameters. It was thus also proposed in the documentary that a revisal of the textile industry guidelines could include more parameters such as sulphites and heavy metals.

On December 5, 2008, the Asian Development Bank approved a $500 million loan for cleaning up the river, calling it the world's dirtiest.

Environmentalists have observed that over 20,000 tons of waste and 340,000 tons of wastewater from those textile factories are disposed of into the river daily. A result of this pollution has been the elimination of a significant part of the river's fish population estimated at 60% since 2008.

== Revitalization ==
In November 2011, the river revitalization began, with an expected cost of Rp35 trillion ($4 billion) over 15 years. The revitalization is occurring from Mount Wayang through eight regencies and three cities for a distance of 180 kilometers. The target for the first three years is to collect 10.5 million cubic meters of sedimentation. In February 2018, the President of Indonesia Joko Widodo launched a seven-year plan to clean up the whole river to achieve clean drinking-water status, ordering 7,000 regular soldiers to clean up allocated sections of the river regularly. They have the power to block up outlets conveying polluted wastewater from factories into the river and are installing rubbish treatment and water treatment facilities. Problems include lack of money for continuing action, lack of coordination at the local level, bribes paid by factories to avoid change, and upstream soil erosion from deforestation that enhances the silting of the lower river. But with wider internet publicity, and now the top-down government enforcement, more foreign consultants are coming in to recommend necessary changes upstream, and local awareness and anti-plastics campaigns are beginning to take effect.

== See also ==
- Environmental issues in Indonesia
- Kali Bekasi
- List of drainage basins of Indonesia
- Water supply and sanitation in Indonesia
- Fast fashion
