= Javanese historical texts =

Javanese literature has a very large historical component. In all sorts of texts, such as laudatory poems, chronicles, and travelogues, writers have interpreted the how and why of certain circumstances.

These texts are important for the knowledge of Javanese perspectives on the past. Scholars of Javanese history have paid much attention to theoretical questions, aiming at a balanced evaluation of Javanese historiography next to Western historiography. In doing so they focused on Old and Modern Javanese sources, drawing both on written sources and archaeological and epigraphic material. The debate continues up to the present.

== Babads ==
Babads as a genre belong to the traditional literature. A characteristic of this kind of literature is that it is written in metrical form and is governed by a set of strict conventions. In traditional Javanese society, prose (gancaran) was not considered to be belles letters but was considered to be merely sets of notes or aide-mémoires.

This approach reflected the way in which literature was presented: text was not usually read in silence but, rather, was recited or sung to an audience. Every metre had its own particular melody or melodies to which it was sung, in harmony with the contents of the story.

The word babad means 'a story about past events', 'text on the clearing of (the land...)', i.e. 'story about the origin of this or that settlement'.

The Babad Basuki relates the clearing of the jungle and founding of a new settlement in Besuki (East Java), while the Babad Dipanegara relates the events connected with the insurrection of Diponegoro.

== Kakawin and kidung ==
Kakawin are long epic poems in a defined metre inherited from Sanskrit poetic forms. Kidung are epic poems in Javanese metres.

== See also ==
- Bhinneka Tunggal Ika
- Hans Ras
- Javanese poetry
- Nagarakretagama
