= Messiah =

Saviour or liberator of a group of people

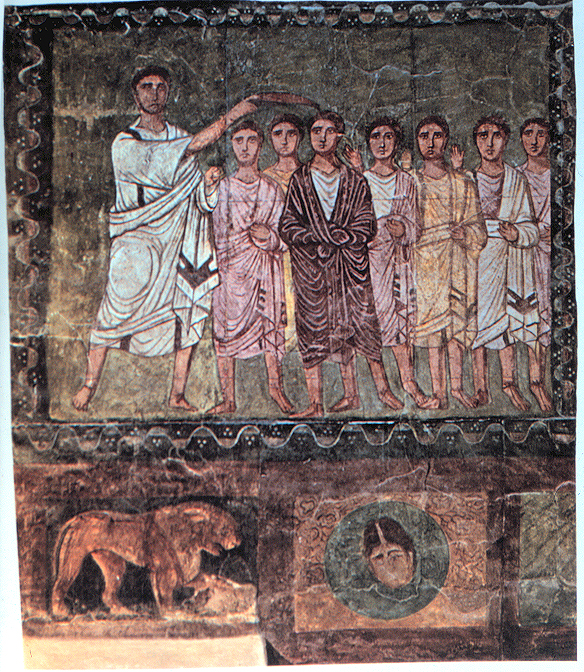
Samuel anoints David, Dura Europos, Syria, 3rd century CE

In Abrahamic religions, a messiah or messias (Hebrew: מָשִׁיחַ, romanized: māšīaḥ; Greek: μεσσίας, romanized: messías; Arabic: مسيح, romanized: masīḥ; lit. 'anointed one') is a saviour or liberator of a group of people. The concepts of mashiach, messianism, and of a Messianic Age originated in Judaism, and in the Hebrew Bible, in which a mashiach is the heavenly sovereign, king of prophets, or High Priest traditionally anointed with holy anointing oil.

In Judaism, Ha-mashiach (המשיח, 'the Messiah'), (Note: The specific expression ha mashiach does not occur in the Tanakh.) often referred to as melekh ha-mashiach (מלך המשיח, 'King Messiah'), is a Jewish leader, physically descended via a human genetic father of an unbroken paternal Davidic line through King David and King Solomon. He will accomplish predetermined things in a future arrival, including the unification of the tribes of Israel, the gathering of all Jews to Eretz Israel, the rebuilding of the Temple in Jerusalem, the ushering in of a Messianic Age of global universal peace, and (according to most rabbis) the annunciation of the world to come.

The Greek translation of Messiah is Khristós (Χριστός), anglicized as Christ. It occurs 41 times in the Septuagint and 529 times in the New Testament. Christians commonly refer to Jesus of Nazareth as either the "Christ" or the "Messiah", believing that the Old Testament messianic prophecies were fulfilled in the mission, death, and resurrection of Jesus and that he will return in a second coming to fulfill the rest of messianic prophecies. Moreover, unlike the Judaic concept of the Messiah, Jesus Christ is considered the Son of God, although in the Jewish faith the King of Israel was also metaphorically called the Son of God.

In Islam, Jesus (Arabic: عيسى, romanized: Isa) is held to have been a prophet and the Messiah sent to the Israelites, who will return to Earth at the end of times along with the Mahdi, and defeat al-Masih ad-Dajjal, the false Messiah.

In Ahmadiyya theology, these prophecies concerning the Mahdi and the second coming of Jesus are believed to have been fulfilled in Mirza Ghulam Ahmad (1835–1908), the founder of the Ahmadiyya Movement, wherein the terms Messiah and Mahdi are synonyms for one and the same person.

In controversial Chabad messianism, (Note: Also: Habad messianism, Lubavitcher messianism, mishichism, meshichism.) Yosef Yitzchak Schneersohn (r. 1920–1950), sixth Rebbe (spiritual leader) of Chabad Lubavitch, and Menachem Mendel Schneerson (1902–1994), seventh Rebbe of Chabad, are Messiah claimants.

== Etymology ==
'Messiah' is the transliteration of Hebrew מָשִׁיחַ, mashiaḥ, "anointed", from the verb מָשַׁח, mashaḥ, "to rub with oil, to anoint"; in the Septuagint the Hebrew word is calqued into χριστός, christos, "anointed", from the verb χρίω, chrio, "to rub with oil, to anoint", which is the source of the English title "Christ".

In Hebrew, the Messiah is often referred to as מלך המשיח, melekh mashiach (Tiberian: Meleḵ ha-Mašīaḥ, pronounced [ˈmeleχ hamaˈʃiaħ]), literally meaning 'the Anointed King'. The Greek Septuagint version of the Old Testament renders all 39 instances of the Hebrew mašíaḥ as Χριστός, Khristós. The New Testament records the Greek transliteration Μεσσίας, Messias twice in John.

المسيح, al-Masīḥ (pronounced [maˈsiːħ], lit. 'the anointed', 'the traveller', or 'one who cures by caressing') is the Arabic word for 'messiah' used by both Arab Christians and Muslims. In modern Arabic, it is used as one of the many titles of Jesus, referred to as يسوع المسيح, Yasūʿ al-Masīḥ by Arab Christians and عيسى المسيح, Īsā al-Masīḥ by Muslims.

== Judaism ==
The literal translation of the Hebrew word מָשִׁיחַ, mashiach is 'anointed', which refers to a ritual of consecrating someone or something by putting holy oil upon it. It is used throughout the Hebrew Bible in reference to a wide variety of individuals and objects; for example, kings, priests and prophets, the altar in the Temple, vessels, unleavened bread, and even a non-Jewish king (Cyrus the Great).

In Jewish eschatology, the term came to refer to a future Jewish king from the Davidic line, who will be "anointed" with holy anointing oil, to be king of God's kingdom, and rule the Jewish people during the Messianic Age. In Judaism, the Messiah is not considered to be God or a pre-existent divine Son of God. He is considered to be a great political leader that has descended from King David, hence why he is referred to as Messiah ben David, 'Messiah, son of David'. In Judaism, the messiah is considered to be a great, charismatic leader that is well oriented with the laws that are followed in Judaism.

Though originally a fringe idea, somewhat controversially, belief in the eventual coming of a future messiah is a fundamental part of Judaism, and is one of Maimonides' 13 Principles of Faith. Maimonides describes the identity of the Messiah in the following terms:

And if a king shall arise from among the House of David, studying Torah and occupied with commandments like his father David, according to the written and oral Torah, and he will impel all of Israel to follow it and to strengthen breaches in its observance, and will fight God's wars, this one is to be treated as if he were the anointed one. If he succeeded and built the Holy Temple in its proper place and gathered the dispersed ones of Israel together, this is indeed the anointed one for certain, and he will mend the entire world to worship the Lord together, as it is stated: "For then I shall turn for the nations a clear tongue, so that they will all proclaim the Name of the Lord, and to worship Him with a united resolve (Zephaniah 3:9).

Even though the eventual coming of the messiah is a strongly upheld belief in Judaism, trying to predict the actual time when the messiah will come is an act that is frowned upon. These kinds of actions are thought to weaken the faith the people have in the religion. So in Judaism, there is no specific time when the messiah comes. Rather, it is the acts of the people that determines when the messiah comes. It is said that the messiah would come either when the world needs his coming the most (when the world is so sinful and in desperate need of saving by the messiah) or deserves it the most (when genuine goodness prevails in the world).

A common modern rabbinic interpretation is that there is a potential messiah in every generation. The Talmud, which often uses stories to make a moral point (aggadah), tells of a highly respected rabbi who found the Messiah at the gates of Rome and asked him, "When will you finally come?" He was quite surprised when he was told, "Today." Overjoyed and full of anticipation, the man waited all day. The next day he returned, disappointed and puzzled, and asked, "You said messiah would come 'today' but he didn't come! What happened?" The Messiah replied, "Scripture says, 'Today, if you will but hearken to his voice.'"

A Kabbalistic tradition within Judaism is that the commonly discussed messiah who will usher in a period of freedom and peace, Messiah ben David, will be preceded by Messiah ben Joseph, who will gather the children of Israel around him, leading them to Jerusalem. After overcoming the hostile powers in Jerusalem, Messiah ben Joseph, will reestablish the Temple-worship and set up his own dominion. Then Armilus, according to one group of sources, or Gog and Magog, according to the other, will appear with their hosts before Jerusalem, wage war against Messiah ben Joseph, and slay him. His corpse, according to one group, will lie unburied in the streets of Jerusalem; according to the other, it will be hidden by the angels with the bodies of the Patriarchs, until Messiah ben David comes and brings him back to life.

=== Sabbatai Zevi ===
Active throughout the Ottoman Empire, Sabbatai Zevi claimed to be the long-awaited Jewish Messiah. Due to his conversion under duress to Islam, he became known among Jews as perhaps history's second most famous false messiah.

=== Chabad ===
Yosef Yitzchak Schneersohn (r. 1920–1950), sixth Rebbe (hereditary chassidic leader) of Chabad Lubavitch, and Menachem Mendel Schneerson (1902–1994), seventh Rebbe of Chabad, are messiah claimants.

As per Chabad-Lubavitch messianism, Menachem Mendel Schneerson openly declared his deceased father-in-law, the former 6th Rebbe of Chabad Lubavitch, to be the Messiah. He published about Yosef Yitzchak Schneersohn to be "Atzmus u'mehus alein vi er hat zich areingeshtalt in a guf" (Yiddish and English for: "Essence and Existence [of God] which has placed itself in a body"). The gravesite of his deceased father-in-law Yosef Yitzchak Schneersohn, known as "the Ohel", became a central point of focus for Menachem Mendel Schneerson's prayers and supplications.

Regarding the deceased Menachem Mendel Schneerson, some claim that it was "incumbent on every single Jew to heed the Rebbe's words and believe that he is indeed King Moshiach, who will be revealed imminently". Outside of Chabad messianism, in Judaism, there is no basis to these claims. Still today, the deceased rabbi Menachem Mendel Schneerson is believed to be the Messiah among adherents of the Chabad movement, and his second coming is believed to be imminent. He is venerated and invocated to by thousands of visitors and letters each year at the (Ohel), especially in a pilgrimage each year on the anniversary of his death.

There are some who maintain that rabbi Menachem Mendel Schneerson is alive today and will come out of hiding and bring the messiah. Many of those who maintain this believe that he is hiding under the Bima (בימה) and that he will come out from under it when he brings the messiah.

== Christianity ==
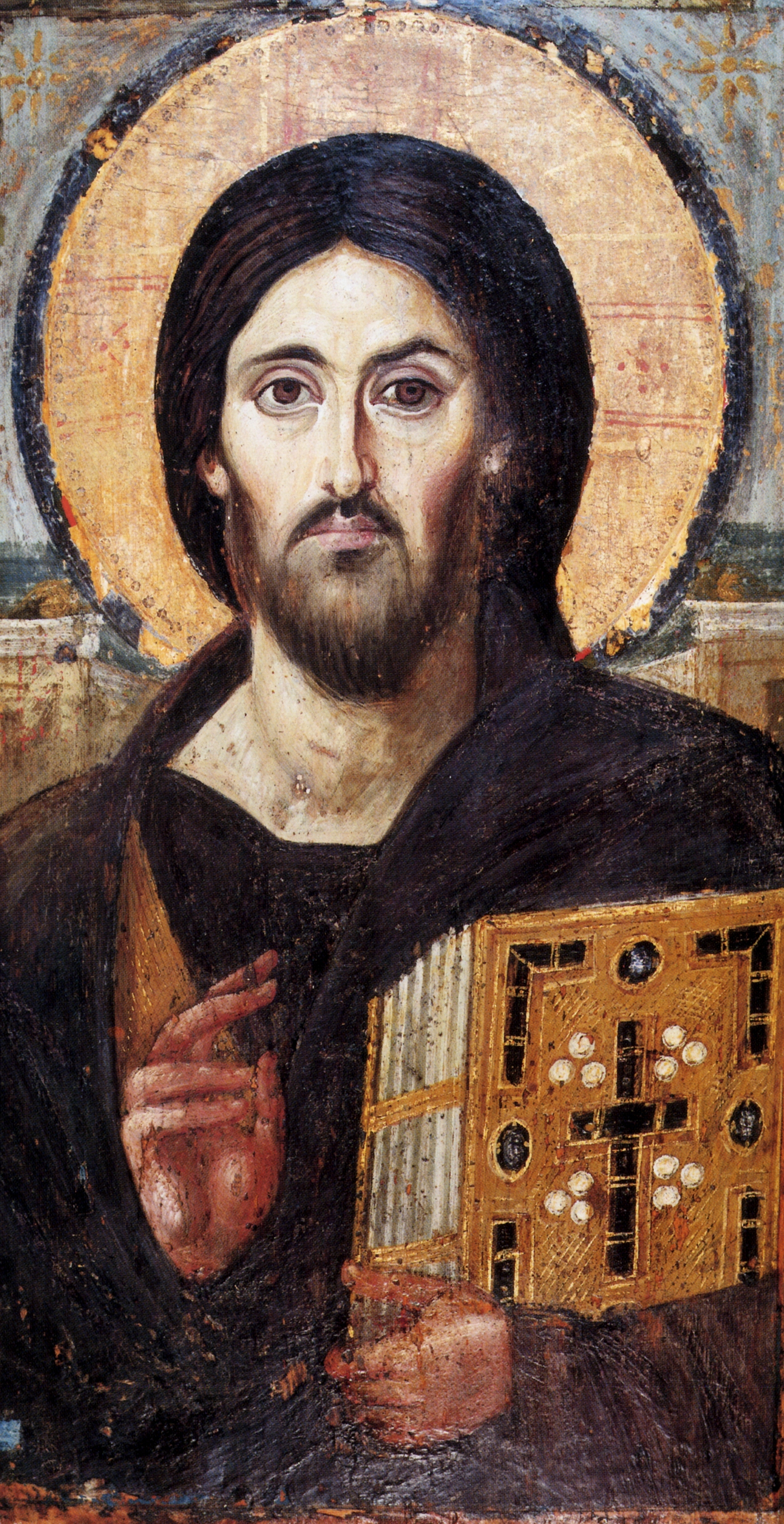
The Christ Pantocrator of Saint Catherine's Monastery at Mount Sinai, 6th century AD

Originating from the concept in Judaism, the messiah in Christianity is called the Christ—from Greek khristós (χριστός), translating the Hebrew word of the same meaning. 'Christ' became the accepted Christian designation and title of Jesus of Nazareth, as Christians believe that the messianic prophecies in the Old Testament—that he is descended from the Davidic line, and was declared King of the Jews—were fulfilled in his mission, death, and resurrection, while the rest of the prophecies—that he will usher in a Messianic Age and the world to come—will be fulfilled at his Second Coming.

The majority of historical and mainline Christian theologies consider Jesus to be the Son of God and God the Son, a concept of the messiah fundamentally different from the Jewish and Islamic concepts. In each of the four New Testament Gospels, the only literal anointing of Jesus is conducted by a woman. In the Gospels of Mark, Matthew, and John, this anointing occurs in Bethany, outside Jerusalem. In the Gospel of Luke, the anointing scene takes place at an indeterminate location, but the context suggests it to be in Galilee, or even a separate anointing altogether.

Aside from Jesus, the Book of Isaiah refers to Cyrus the Great, king of the Achaemenid Empire, as a messiah for his decree to rebuild the Jerusalem Temple.

== Islam ==
Timeline of Jesus in Islamic eschatology

The Islamic faith uses the Arabic term al-Masīḥ (المسيح, pronounced [almaˈsiːħ]) to refer to Jesus. However the meaning is different from that found in Christianity and Judaism:

Though Islam shares many of the beliefs and characteristics of the two Semitic/Abrahamic/monotheistic religions which preceded it, the idea of messianism, which is of central importance in Judaism and Christianity, is alien to Islam as represented by the Qur'an.

Unlike the Christian view of the Death of Jesus, Muslims believe Jesus was raised to Heaven without being put on the cross and God created a resemblance to appear exactly like Jesus who was crucified instead of Jesus, and he ascended bodily to Heaven, there to remain until his Second Coming in the End days.

The Quran states that Jesus (Isa), the son of Maryam (Isa ibn Maryam), is the messiah (al-masih) and prophet sent to the Children of Israel. According to Qadi al-Nu'man, a famous Muslim jurist of the Fatimid period, the Quran identifies Jesus as the messiah because he was sent to the people who responded to him in order to remove (masaha) their impurities, the ailments of their faith, whether apparent (zāhir) or hidden (bātin).

Jesus is one of the most important prophets in the Islamic tradition, along with Noah, Abraham, Moses, and Muhammad. Unlike Christians, Muslims see Jesus as a prophet, but not as God himself or the son of God. This is because prophecy in human form does not represent the true powers of God, contrary to the popular depiction of Jesus in Christianity. Thus, like all other Islamic prophets, Jesus is one of the grand prophets who receives revelations from God. According to religious scholar Mona Siddiqui, in Islam, "[p]rophecy allows God to remain veiled and there is no suggestion in the Qur'an that God wishes to reveal of himself just yet. Prophets guarantee interpretation of revelation and that God's message will be understood." In Sura 19, the Quran describes the birth of Isa, and Sura 4 explicitly identifies Isa as the Son of Maryam. Sunni Muslims believe Isa is alive in Heaven and did not die in the crucifixion. Sura 4, verses 157–158, also states that:

But they neither killed nor crucified him—it was only made to appear so.

According to religious scholar Mahmoud Ayoub, "Jesus' close proximity or nearness (qurb) to God is affirmed in the Qur'anic insistence that Jesus did not die, but was taken up to God and remains with God."

While the Quran does not state that he will come back, Islamic tradition nevertheless believes that Jesus, preceded closely by al-Mahdi, will return at the end of times, and exercise his power of healing. He will forever destroy the falsehood embodied in al-Masih ad-Dajjal (the false Messiah), the great falsifier, a figure similar to the Antichrist in Christianity, who will emerge shortly before Yawm al-Qiyāmah ('the Day of Resurrection'). After he has destroyed ad-Dajjal, his final task will be to become leader of the Muslims. Isa will unify the Muslim Ummah (the followers of Islam) under the common purpose of worshipping God alone in pure Islam, thereby ending divisions and deviations by adherents. Mainstream Muslims believe that at that time, Isa will dispel Christian and Jewish claims about him.

A hadith in Abu Dawud says:

The Prophet said: There is no prophet between me and him, that is, Isa. He will descend (to the earth). When you see him, recognise him: a man of medium height, reddish fair, wearing two light yellow garments, looking as if drops were falling down from his head though it will not be wet. He will fight the people for the cause of Islam. He will break the cross, kill swine, and abolish jizyah. Allah will perish all religions except Islam. He will destroy the Antichrist and will live on the earth for forty years and then he will die. The Muslims will pray over him.

— Hadith

Both Sunni and Shia Muslims agree that al-Mahdi will arrive first, and after him, Isa. Isa will proclaim al-Mahdi as the Islamic community leader. A war will be fought—the Dajjal against al-Mahdi and Isa. This war will mark the approach of the coming of the Last Day. After Isa slays al-Dajjāl at the Gate of Lud, he will bear witness and reveal that Islam is indeed the true and last word from God to humanity as Yusuf Ali's translation reads:

And there is none of the People of the Book but must believe in him before his death; and on the Day of Judgment he will be a witness against them.

A hadith in Sahih Bukhari says:

Allah's Apostle said, "How will you be when the son of Mariam descends among you and your Imam is from among you?"

The Quran denies the crucifixion of Jesus, claiming that he was neither killed nor crucified. The Quran also emphasizes the difference between God and the Messiah:

Those who say that Allah is the Messiah, son of Mary, are unbelievers. The Messiah said: "O Children of Israel, worship Allah, my Lord and your Lord... unbelievers too are those who have said that Allah is the third of three... the Messiah, son of Mary, was only a Messenger before whom other Messengers had gone."

=== Shia Islam ===
The Twelver branch of Shia (or Shi'i) Islam, which significantly values and revolves around the Twelve Imams (spiritual leaders), differs significantly from the beliefs of Sunni Islam. Unlike Sunni Islam, "Messianism is an essential part of religious belief and practice for almost all Shi'a Muslims." Shi'i Islam believes that the last Imam will return again, with the return of Jesus. According to religious scholar Mona Siddiqui, "Shi'is are acutely aware of the existence everywhere of the twelfth Imam, who disappeared in 874." Shi'i piety teaches that the hidden Imam will return with Jesus Christ to set up the messianic kingdom before the final Judgement Day, when all humanity will stand before God. There is some controversy as to the identity of this imam. There are sources that underscore how the Shia sect agrees with the Jews and Christians that Imam Mehdi (al-Mahdi) is another name for Elijah, whose return prior to the arrival of the Messiah was prophesied in the Old Testament.

The Imams and Fatima will have a direct impact on the judgements rendered that day, representing the ultimate intercession. There is debate on whether Shi'i Muslims should accept the death of Jesus. Religious scholar Mahmoud Ayoub argues "Modern Shi'i thinkers have allowed the possibility that Jesus died and only his spirit was taken up to heaven." Conversely, Siddiqui argues that Shi'i thinkers believe Jesus was "neither crucified nor slain". She also argues that Shi'i Muslims believe that the twelfth imam did not die, but "was taken to God to return in God's time", and "will return at the end of history to establish the kingdom of God on earth as the expected Mahdi".

=== Ahmadiyya ===
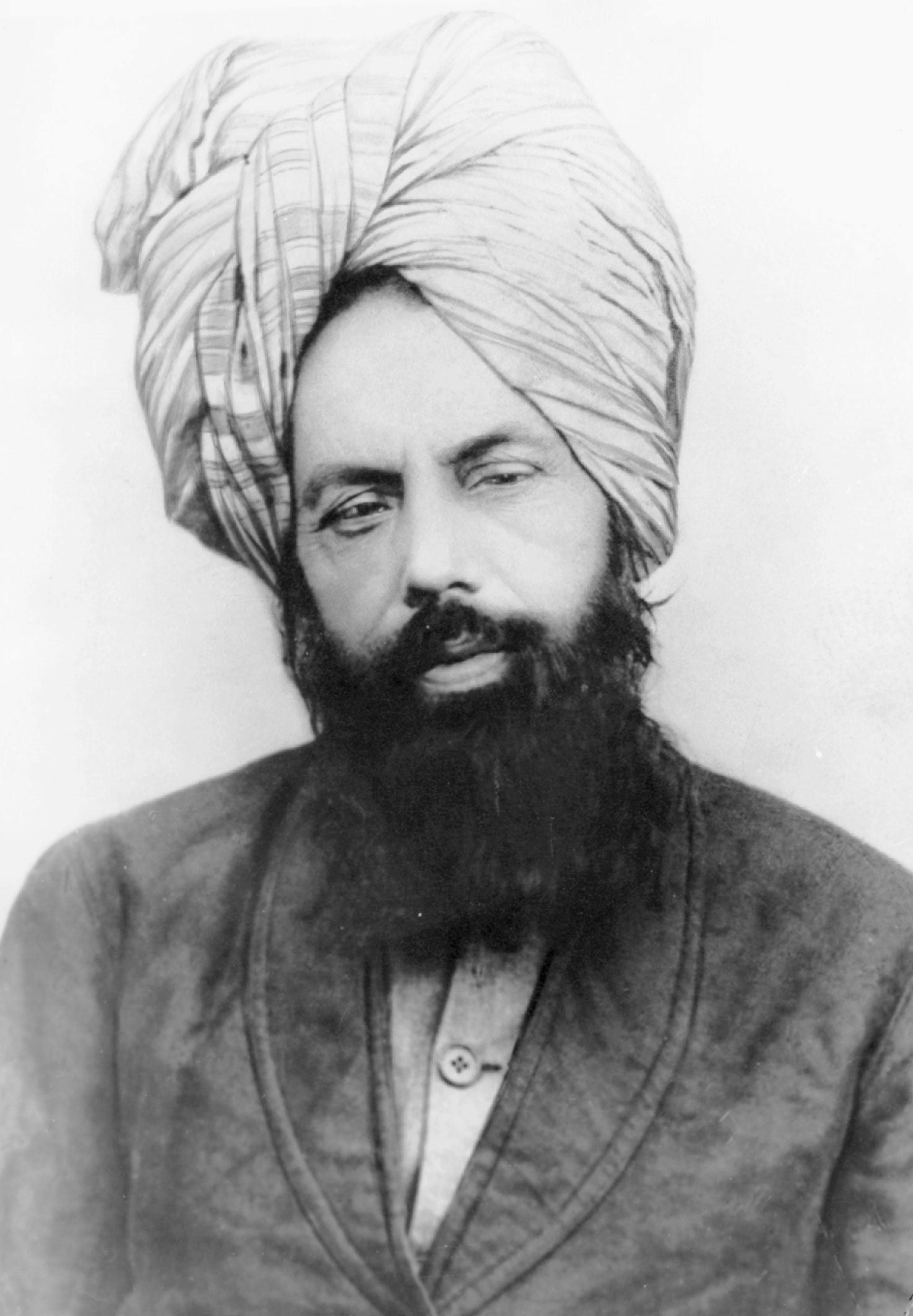
Mirza Ghulam Ahmad, founder of the Ahmadiyya Movement in Islam, considered by Ahmadis to be the Promised Messiah of the latter days

In the theology of Ahmadiyya, the terms Messiah and Mahdi are synonymous terms for one and the same person. The term Mahdi means 'guided [by God]', thus implying a direct ordainment by God of a divinely chosen individual. According to Ahmadi thought, Messiahship is a phenomenon through which a special emphasis is given on the transformation of a people by way of offering to suffer for the sake of God instead of giving suffering (i.e. refraining from revenge).Ahmadis believe that this special emphasis was given through the person of Jesus and Mirza Ghulam Ahmad (1835–1908) among others.

Ahmadis hold that the prophesied eschatological figures of Christianity and Islam, the Messiah and Mahdi, were, in fact, to be fulfilled in one person who was to represent all previous prophets.

Numerous hadith are presented by the Ahmadis in support of their view, such as one from Sunan Ibn Majah, which says, "There is no Mahdi other than Jesus son of Mary".

Ahmadis believe that the prophecies concerning the Mahdi and the second coming of Jesus have been fulfilled in Mirza Ghulam Ahmad (1835–1908), the founder of the Ahmadiyya Movement. Unlike mainstream Muslims, the Ahmadis do not believe that Jesus is alive in heaven, but that he survived the crucifixion and migrated towards the east where he died a natural death and that Ghulam Ahmad was only the promised spiritual second coming and likeness of Jesus, the promised Messiah and Mahdi. He also claimed to have appeared in the likeness of Krishna and that his advent fulfilled certain prophecies found in Hindu scriptures. He stated that the founder of Sikhism was a Muslim saint, who was a reflection of the religious challenges he perceived to be occurring. Ghulam Ahmad wrote Barahin-e-Ahmadiyya in 1880, which incorporated Indian, Sufi, Islamic and Western aspects in order to give life to Islam in the face of the British Raj, Protestant Christianity, and rising Hinduism. He later declared himself the Promised Messiah and the Mahdi following Divine revelations in 1891. Ghulam Ahmad argued that Jesus had appeared 1300 years after the formation of the Muslim community and stressed the need for a current Messiah, in turn claiming that he himself embodied both the Mahdi and the Messiah. Ghulam Ahmad was supported by Muslims who especially felt oppressed by Christian and Hindu missionaries.

== Druze faith ==
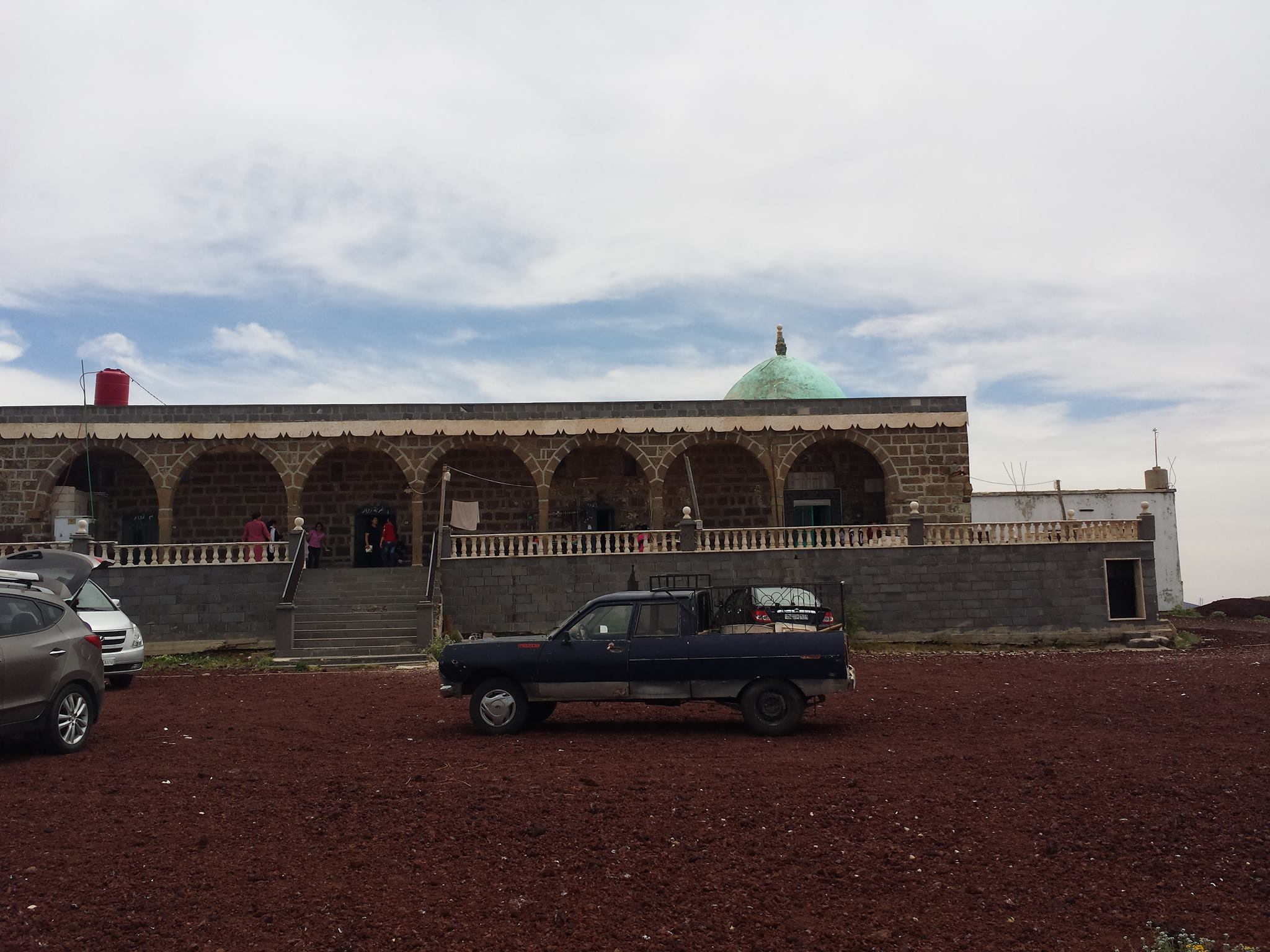
The Druze maqam of Al-masih (Jesus) in As-Suwayda Governorate

In the Druze faith, Jesus is considered the Messiah and one of God's important prophets, being among the seven prophets who appeared in different periods of history. According to the Druze manuscripts Jesus is the Greatest Imam and the incarnation of Ultimate Reason (Akl) on earth and the first cosmic principle (Hadd), and regards Jesus and Hamza ibn Ali as the incarnations of one of the five great celestial powers, who form part of their system. Druze doctrines include the beliefs that Jesus was born of a virgin named Mary, performed miracles, and died by crucifixion. In the Druze tradition, Jesus is known under three titles: the True Messiah (al-Masih al-Haq), the Messiah of all Nations (Masih al-Umam), and the Messiah of Sinners. This is due, respectively, to the belief that Jesus delivered the true Gospel message, the belief that he was the Saviour of all nations, and the belief that he offers forgiveness.

Druze believe that Hamza ibn Ali was a reincarnation of Jesus, and that Hamza ibn Ali is the true Messiah, who directed the deeds of the messiah Jesus "the son of Joseph and Mary", but when messiah Jesus "the son of Joseph and Mary" strayed from the path of the true Messiah, Hamza filled the hearts of the Jews with hatred for him - and for that reason, they crucified him, according to the Druze manuscripts. Despite this, Hamza ibn Ali took him down from the cross and allowed him to return to his family, in order to prepare men for the preaching of his religion.

== Other religions ==
- In Buddhism, Maitreya is considered to be the next Buddha (awakened one) that is promised to come. He is expected to come to renew the laws of Buddhism once the teaching of Gautama Buddha has completely decayed.
- In the Bahá'í Faith, Baháʼu'lláh, the founder of the Baháʼí Faith, is believed to be "He whom God will make manifest" prophesied of in Bábism. He claimed to be the Messiah figure of previous religions (Judaism, Christianity, Islam, Zoroastrianism, Buddhism and Hinduism). He also taught that additional Messiahs, or "Manifestations of God", will appear in the distant future, but the next one would not appear until after the lapse of "a full thousand years".
- Emperor Haile Selassie I of Ethiopia is believed to be the Messiah by followers of the Rastafari movement. This idea further supports the belief that God himself is black, which they (followers of the Rastafarian movement) try to further strengthen by a verse from the Bible. Even if the Emperor denied being the messiah, the followers of the Rastafari movement believe that he is a messenger from God. To justify this, Rastafarians used reasons such as Emperor Haile Selassie's bloodline, which is assumed to come from King Solomon of Israel, and the various titles given to him, which include Lord of Lords, King of Kings and Conquering Lion of the tribe of Judah.
- In Kebatinan (Javanese religious tradition), Satrio Piningit is a character in Jayabaya's prophecies who is destined to become a great leader of Nusantara and to rule the world from Java. In Serat Pararaton, King Jayabaya of Kediri foretold that before the coming of Satrio Piningit, there would be flash floods and that volcanoes would erupt without warning. Satrio Piningit is a Krishna-like figure known as Ratu Adil (Indonesian: 'Just King, King of Justice') and his weapon is a trishula.
- In Zoroastrianism there are three messiah figures who each progressively bring about the final renovation of the world, the Frashokereti and all of these three figures are called Saoshyant.
- In Aradia, or the Gospel of the Witches, the messiah is Aradia, daughter of the goddess Diana, who comes to Earth in order to establish the practice of witchcraft before returning to Heaven.

== Popular culture ==
=== In Literature ===
- Dune Messiah, a 1969 novel by Frank Herbert, second in his Dune trilogy, also part of a miniseries, one of the widest-selling works of fiction in the 1960s.

=== In Film ===
- The Messiah, a 2007 Persian film depicting the life of Jesus from an Islamic perspective
- The Young Messiah, a 2016 American film depicting the childhood life of Jesus from a Christian perspective

=== In Television ===
- Messiah, a 2020 American TV series.

=== Video Games ===
- Messiah appears in Persona 3 as a persona for completing the Judgment Social Link.

== See also ==
- Kalki, a figure in Hindu eschatology
- Li Hong, a figure in Taoist eschatology
- List of messiah claimants
  - Jewish Messiah claimants
  - List of people claimed to be Jesus
  - List of Mahdi claimants
- Messiah complex
- Prophets in Judaism
- Saoshyant, a figure in Zoroastrianism who brings about the final renovation of the world
- Soter
- Year 6000
- Eschatology
- Mab Darogan, a messianic figure of Welsh legend, destined to force the Germanic Anglo-Saxons and Vikings out of Britain and reclaim it for its Celtic Briton inhabitants.
