= Babad Diponegoro =

Autobiographical document of Indonesian Prince Diponegoro

- National Library of Indonesia (Perpustakaan Nasional, Perpusnas), Jakarta.
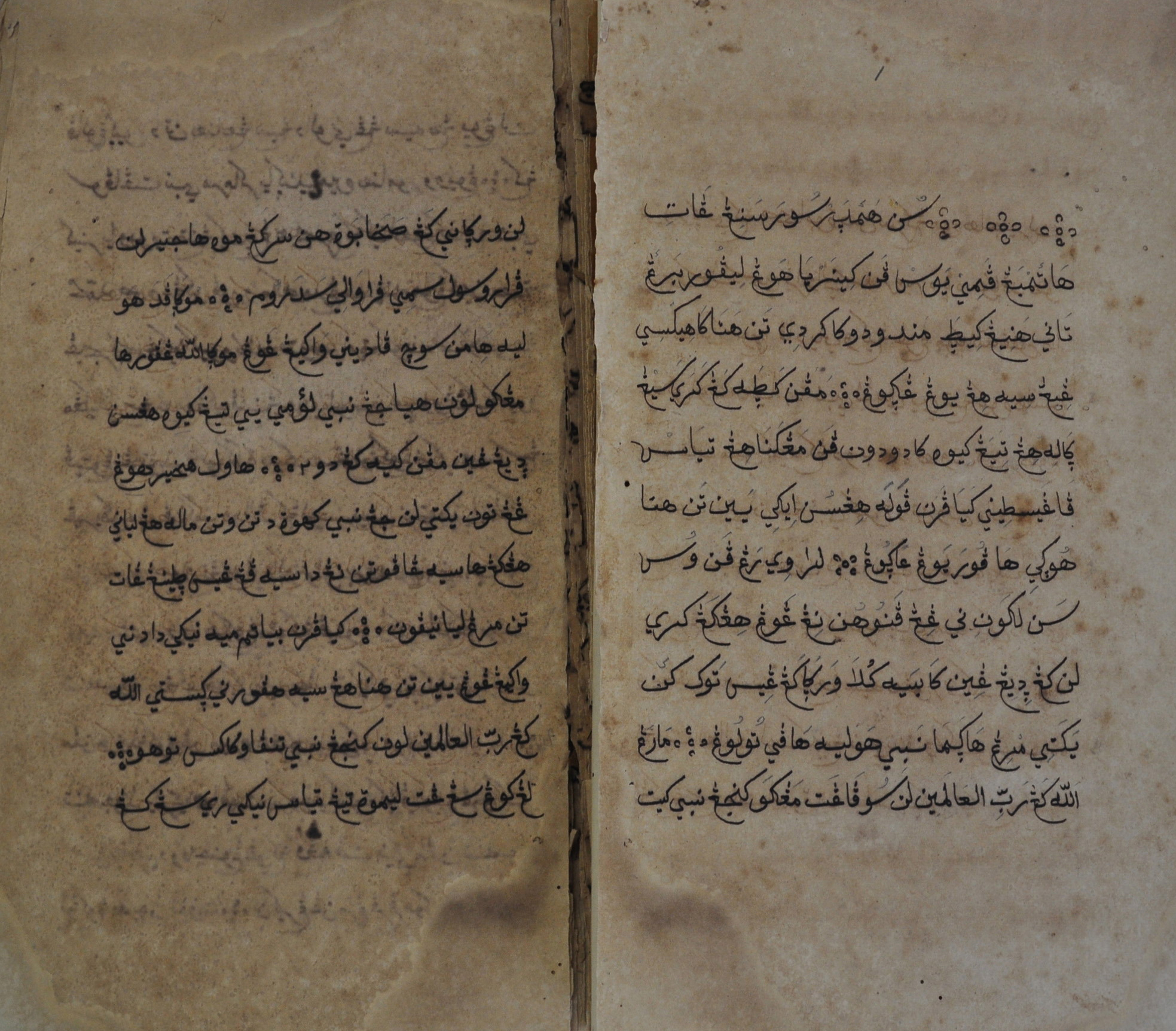
- Babad Diponegoro in Pegon script.
- Date: 20 May 1831–2 February 1832
- Place of origin: Manado and Makassar, Sulawesi, Indonesia
- Language: Javanese
- Author(s): Diponegoro (also known as Bendara Raden Mas Antawirya, Dipanegara, Sultan Ngabul Kamit)
- Other: Signature KBG 282

The Babad Diponegoro (Translation from Javanese: The Chronicle of Diponegoro, alternative spellings Babad Dipanagara, pronunciation "Babad Diponegoro" and Babad Dipanegara) is a reportedly autobiographical chronicle of the Indonesian rebel, national hero and Islamic mystic Prince Diponegoro (1785-1855). In 2013, it was inducted in the Memory of the World International Register maintained by UNESCO as a document of outstanding universal value, together with a 1875 manuscript Dutch translation.

Babad Dipanagara edition of the manuscript at the National Library of Indonesia, published by Albert Rusche & Co in Surakarta in 1908-1909. Incomplete PDF of 491 scans, click to peruse.

A number of variant manuscripts exists, some also called Babad Diponegoro, all reporting on Prince Diponegoro's involvement in the Java War. For example, the illustrated Buku Kedhung Kebo (Chronicle of the Buffaloes' Watering Hole). The historian Peter Carey listed a number of these versions.

== History of the Babad ==
Diponegoro, the eldest son of the Yogyakarta sultan Hamengkubuwono III, was arrested in 1830 in Magelang, Java, during peace negociations with the Dutch colonial government. In exile in Manado and Makassar on the island of Sulawesi, he authored with the help of unidentified scribes a huge versified manuscript, detailing both the political history of Java and his own crucial involvement in the Java or Diponegoro War (1825–1830).

After his death, the manuscript became a family heirloom of the prince’s family. This original was copied in the mid 1860s on behalf of the Dutch scholar A.B. Cohen Stuart (1825–1876) and then returned to the family where it was lost. A Dutch translation of uneven quality by many translators was revised by the Dutch scholar of Javanese and Madurese Willem Palmer van den Broek (1823–1881), and conserved at Leiden University Library, now as the other 2013 Babad entry in UNESCO's Memory of the World International Register.

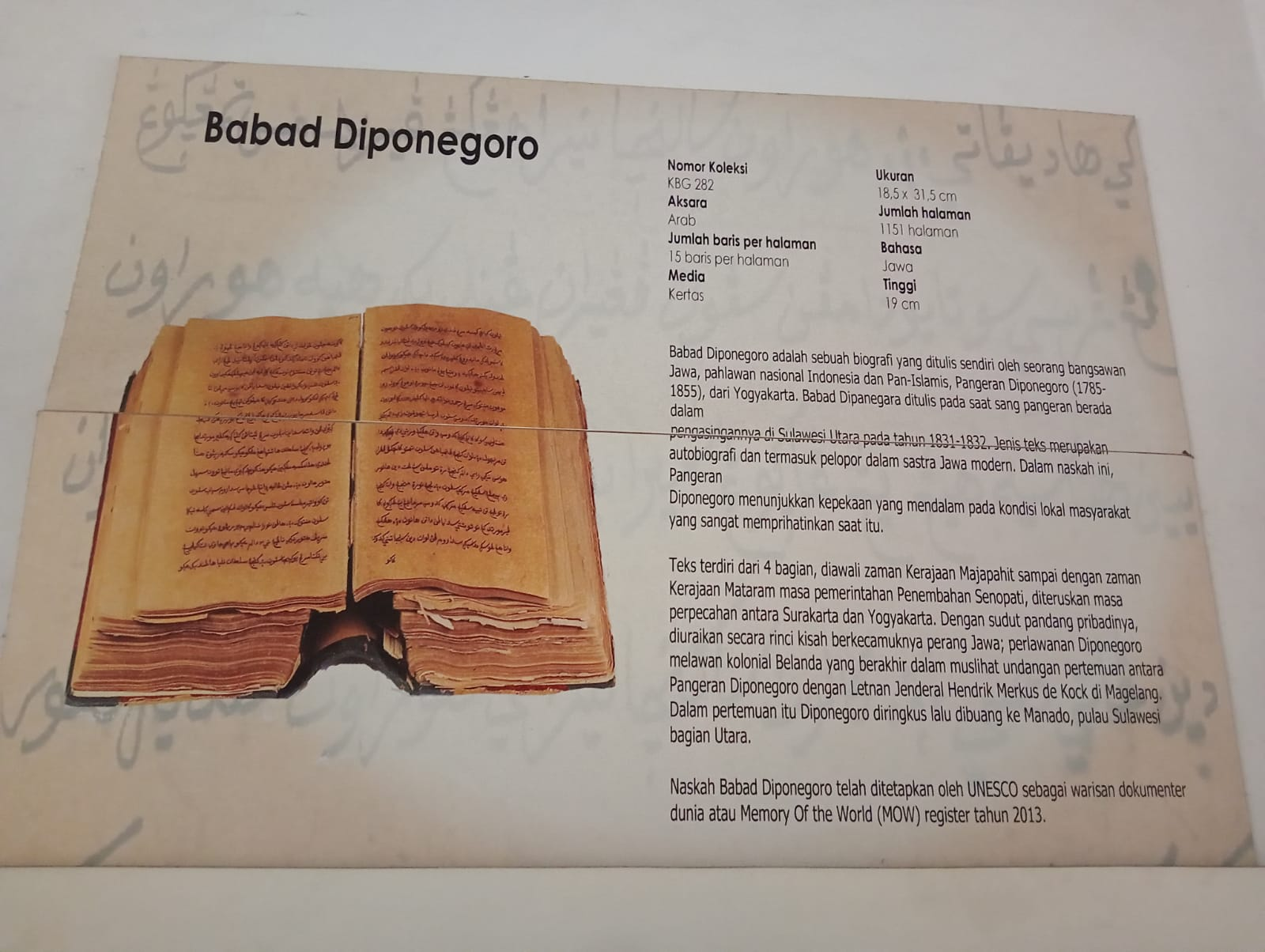
Display of the Babad Diponegoro manuscript at the National Library of Indonesia, Jakarta, 2024. Koleksi Babad Diponegoro.

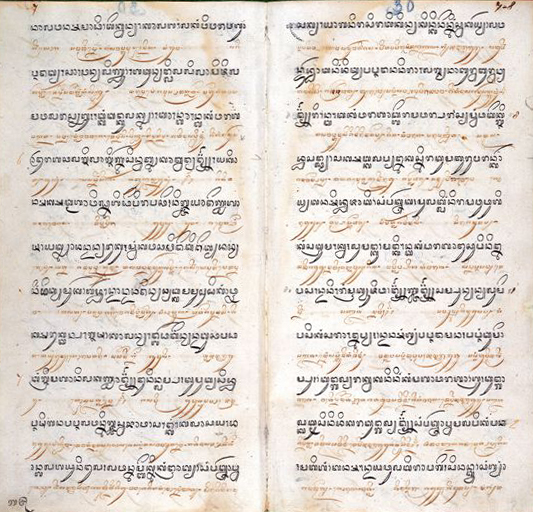
A passage from Babad Diapanagara, written with Balinese-like Javanese script in alternating red and black ink. National Library of Indonesia.

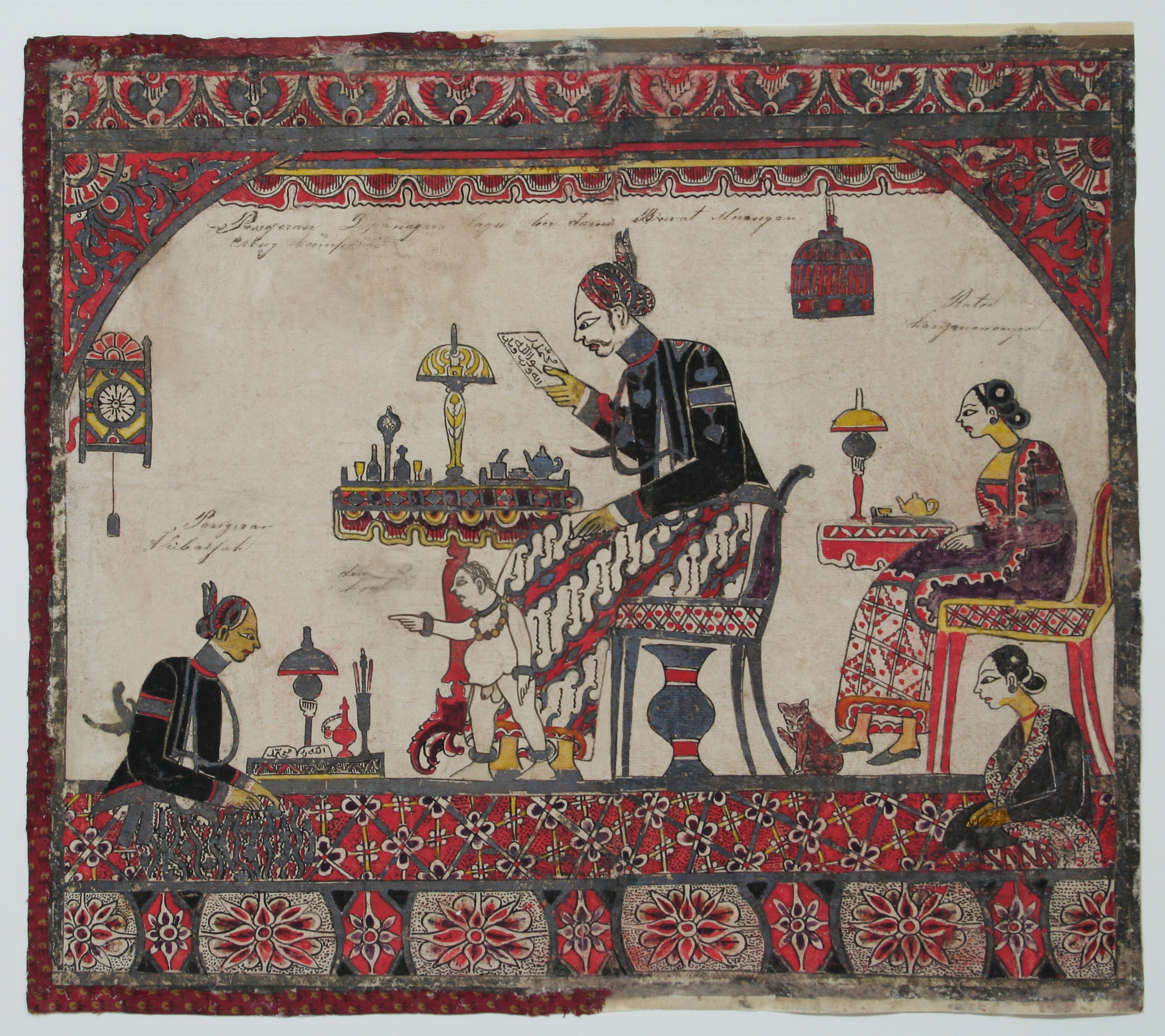
Prince Diponegoro reading an Islamic mystical tasawwuf text in exile. Water colour, anonymous 19th century Javanese.

== Contents ==
The Babad chronicle consists of 1,150 pages, and 43 cantos with a total number of 17,265 verse lines.

The first third part details the history of central and east Java, starting with the Majapahit empire in East Java through to the Mataram Sultanate kingdom of Panembahan Sénapati (reigned, 1575–1601) and Sultan Agung of Mataram (reigned, 1613–1646). It ends with the split of Mataram in the 1755 Treaty of Giyanti, brokered by the Dutch. Pakubuwono III continued to reign over the Mataram successor state of the Surakarta Sunanate, while his uncle prince Sultan Mangkubumi (reigned, 1749–1792) obtained the rule over the newly established Yogyakarta Sultanate as Hamengkubuwono I.

The remainder of the text concerns the biography of Diponegoro, from his birth in 1785 up to his motivation to compose this chronicle in exile, in Manado in 1830. His youth was spent at the estate at Tegalreja near Yogyakarta of his grandmother, where he mixed with local farmers and was educated as a devout Muslim by the local ulamas. During his religious pilgrimage to the south coast of Java around 1805, he met with Java's spirit guardians.

The Babad describes the humiliation of the Yogyakarta court during the governorships of the Dutch Marshal Herman Willem Daendels (reigned 1808–1811) and the British Thomas Stamford Raffles (British interregnum) (1811–1816) with plunderings by both in 1810-1812. The rules of the sultans Hamengkubuwono IV (1814–1822), and his infant successor, Hamengkubuwono V (1822–1826 / 1828–1855) were not able to counter the negative impact of Dutch encroaching colonial policies. Diponegoro had visions of the Javanese Ratu Adil (King of Justice) and the fifteenth and sixteenth century wali (saints, apostles) who had introduced Islam in Java.

The casus belli for outbreak of the Java War on 20 July 1820, was the demarcation of an undesired public highway through the prince’s estate in Tegareja by Dutch-appointed officials. The Babad provides a detailed account of the five-year struggle of Diponegoro's followers against the colonial Dutch troops and their Javanese allies. The chronicle ends with a report of the prince’s treacherous arrest by the Dutch general Hendrik Merkus de Kock at the Magelang peace conference on 28 March 1830, and Diponegoro's subsequent journey in captivity to Batavia (Jakarta) and then to exile in Manado. The Dutch resident there, D.F.W. Pietermaat, is said to promise to forward a request by Diponegoro to the Dutch King Willem I for a hajj pilgrimage to Mecca, in return for a full report by Diponegoro on his Java War.

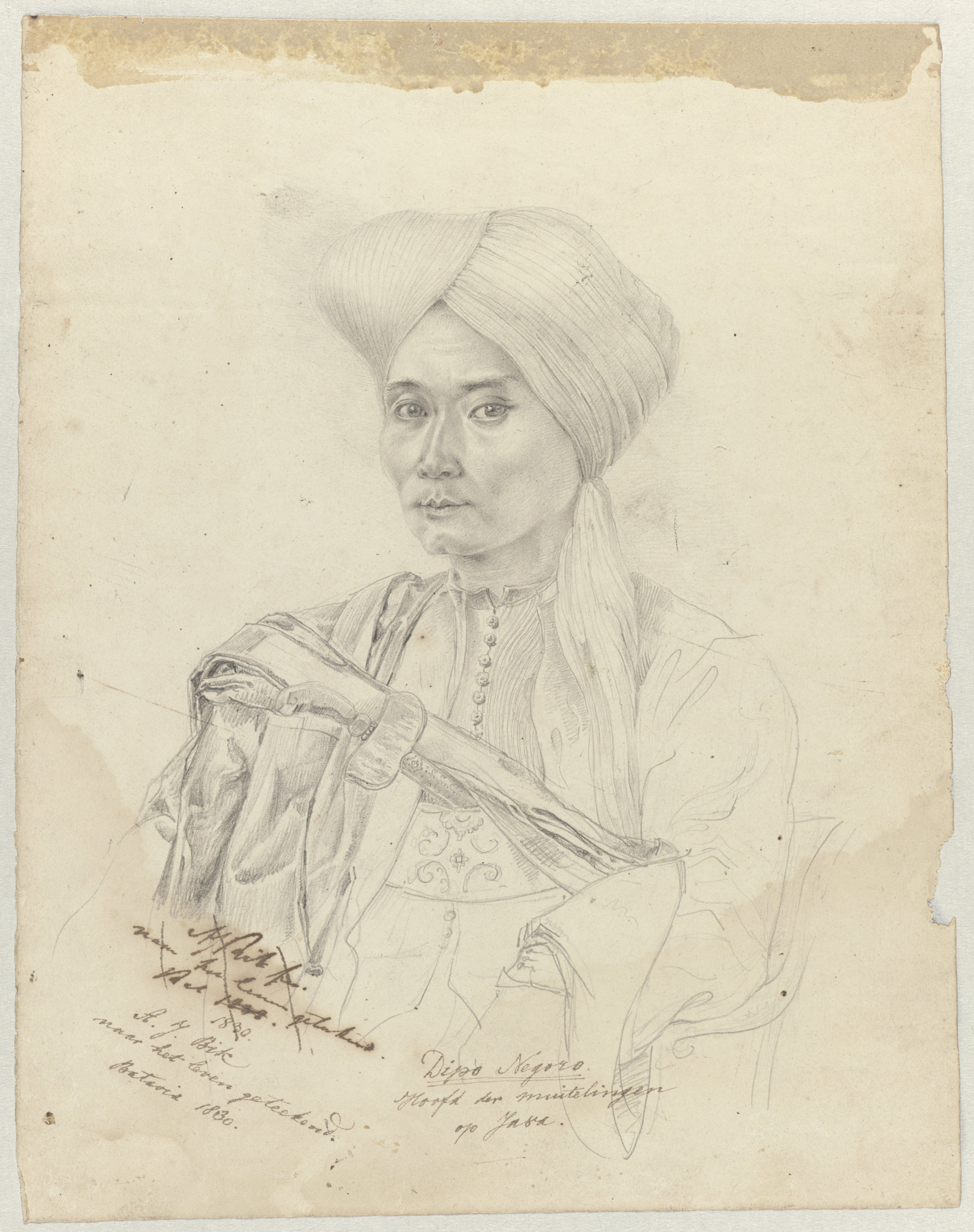
Adrianus Johannes Bik: Dipo Negoro Hoofd der Muitelingen op Java (Dipo Negoro, Leader of the Rebels on Java), drawing, Batavia, 1830. RP-T-00-467-73, Rijksmuseum, Amsterdam.

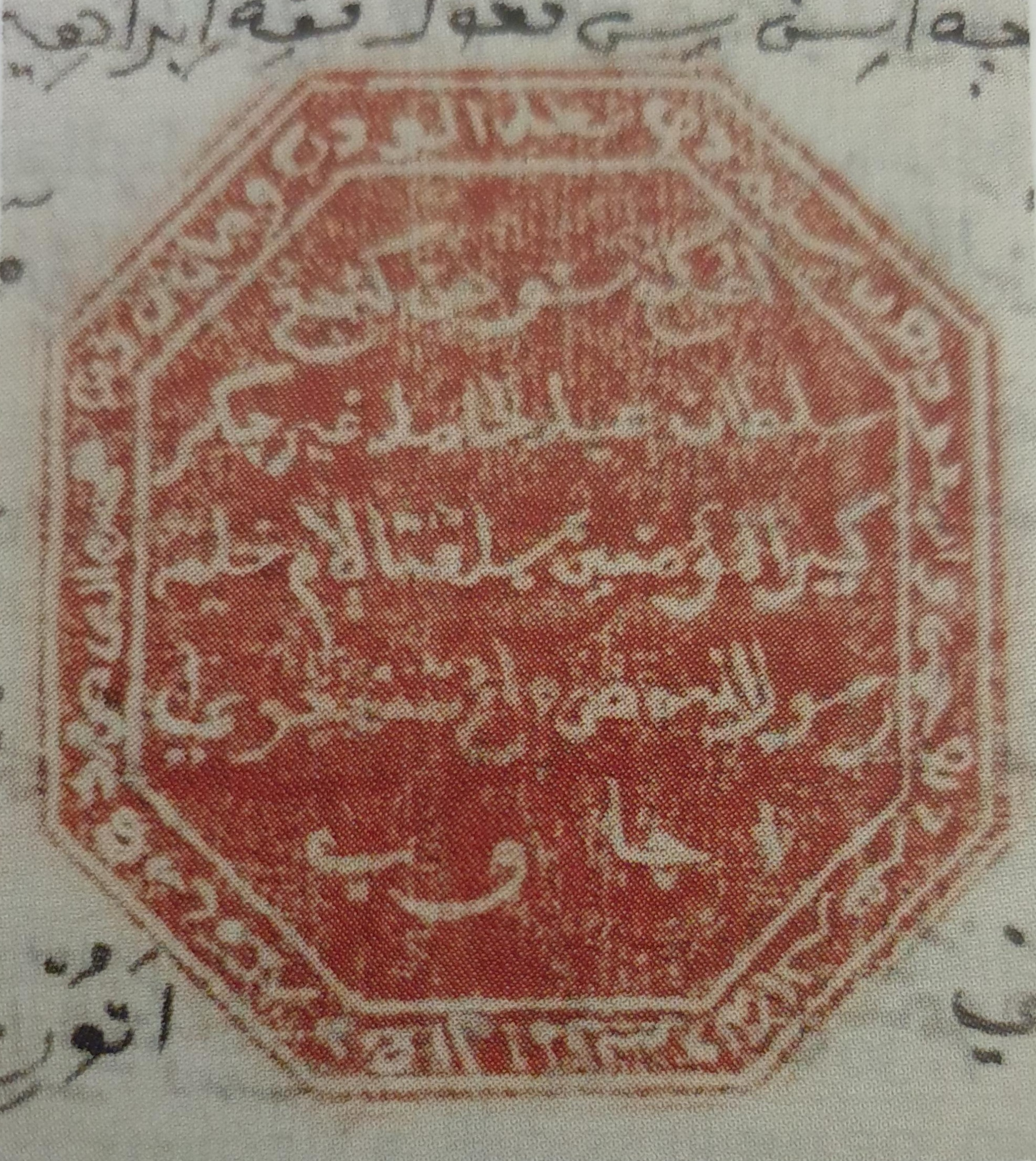
Royal seal of Prince Diponegoro, here styled as Sultan Abdul Hamid Erucakra, octagon in red wax. Letter to Dutch Yogyakarta resident J.F.W. van Nes, 1830 or earlier.

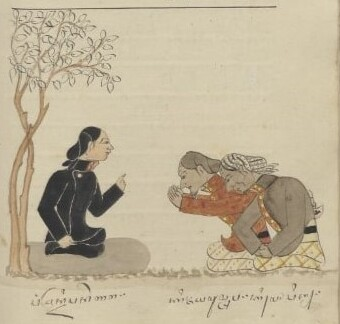
Prince Dipanegara instructs his followers for their pilgrimage, Buku Kedhung Kebo. Babad Dipa Nagara, p. 162-163, Indonesia 1866. Manuscript Leiden D Or. 13.

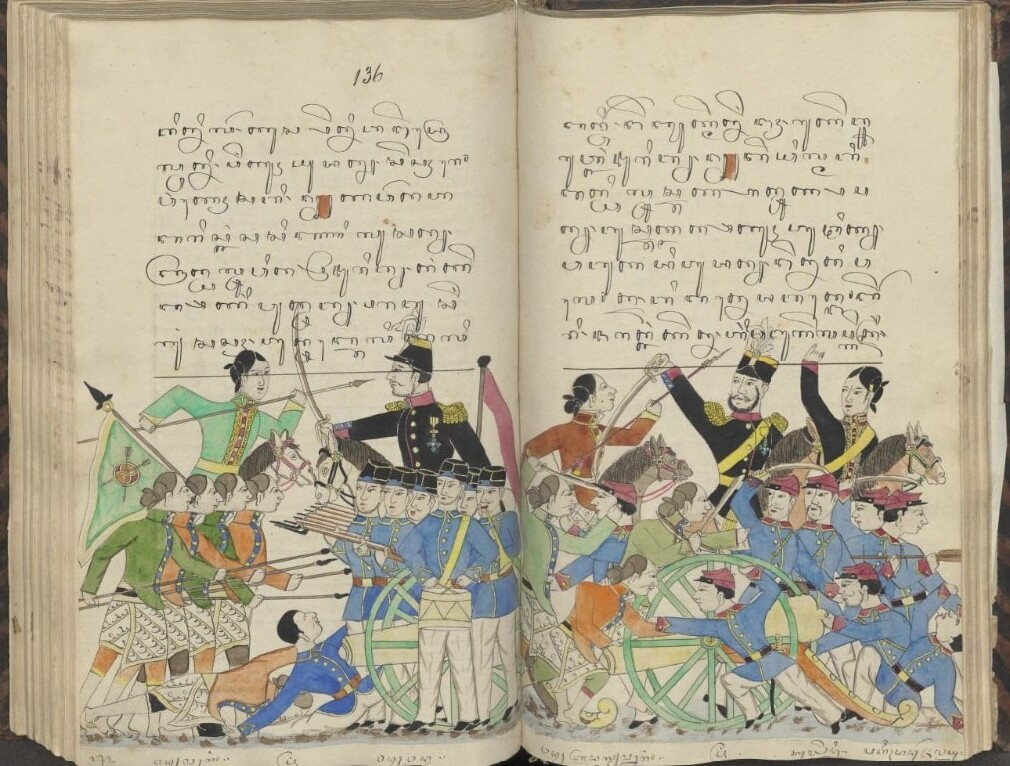
Prince Dipanegara's troops fight with Dutch soldiers. Buku Kedhung Kebo. Babad Dipa Nagara, p. 272-273, Indonesia, 1866.

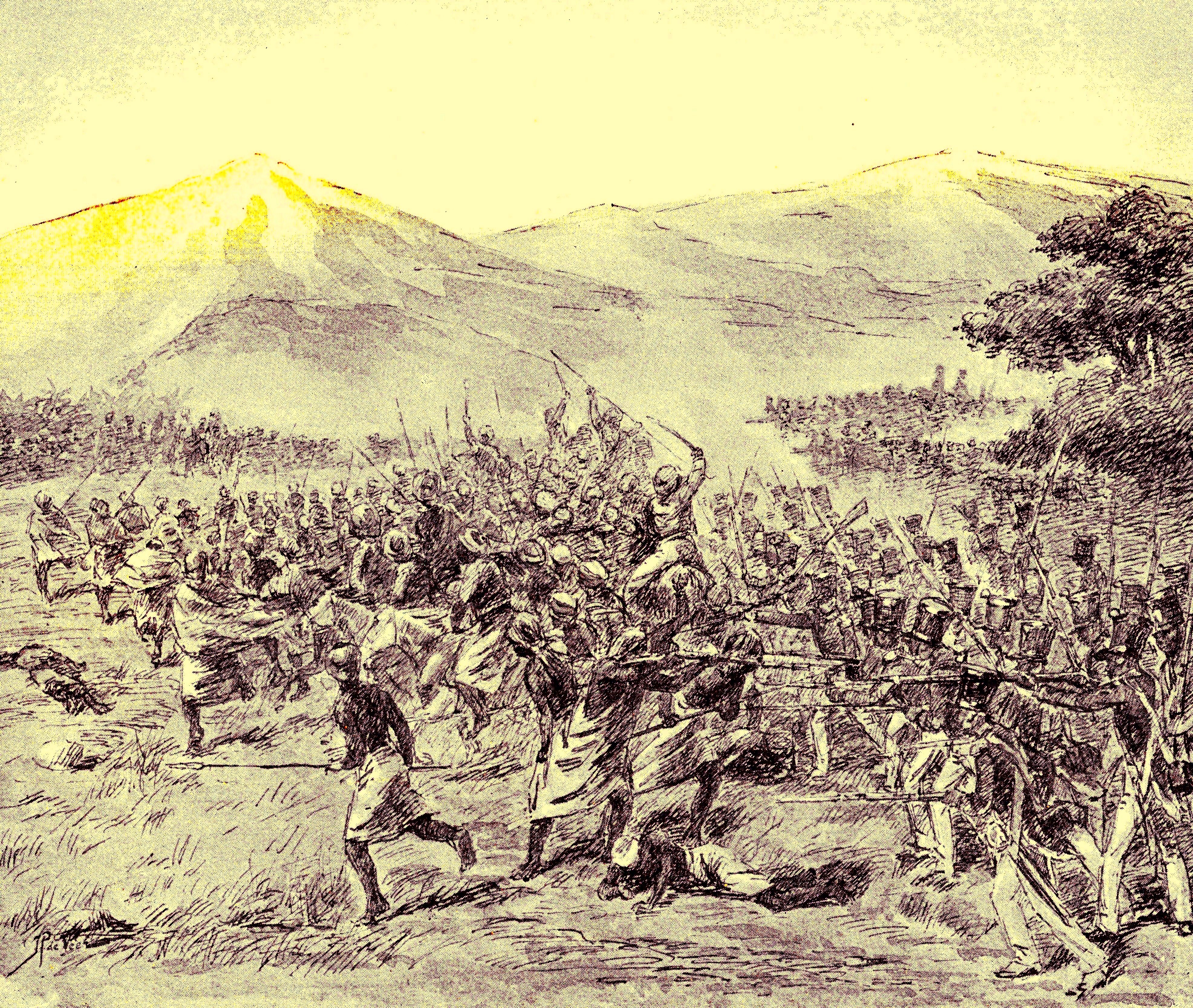
Battle of Gawok (15 October 1826) between Diponegoro's forces and the Dutch colonial army in Gawok, west of Surakarta (1900 drawing).

== Quotes from the Babad Diponegoro ==
=== Opening stanzas ===
(Dutch 1875 translation from the Javanese)

1. Ik openbaar de gevoelens van mijn gemoed in een gedicht om mijn droefheid te verzachten. Terwijl ik het in de stad Menado opstel, is de gunst van den Hoogen God voor mij verborgen.
2. Want veelvuldig zijn mijn aandoeningen over mijn verkeerde handelingen. Ik denk bij mij zelven: wat zal ik doen, als ik geen vergiffenis krijg van den Hoogen God.

— Diponegoro/W. Palmer van den Broek

(English relay translation from the Dutch)

1. I lay out the feelings of my heart in a poem to soften my sadness. Writing in the town of Menado, the grace of the High God is hidden to me.

2. Because often occur my qualms about my wrong actions. I wonder: what shall I do, if I do not receive forgiveness from the High God.

=== Other Babad version: Declaration of the Java War ===
After receiving advice from the religious teacher Taptajani, Prince Diponegoro declares a Holy War against the Europeans and Chinese in Java, as related in Javanese in Canto V (Kinanthi) with translation:

(Javanese)

4. Pangeran ngandika arum
lah ta kaki Taptajani
punapa sampun mangsanya
ubayanira duk nguni
wong sedya prang sabilul(l)ah
payo padha denlekasi

5. ingsun kang nanggulang pupuh
ngulama kang mandhitani
nyirnaken Walonda Cina
ingkang aneng Tanah Jawi
yen datan manut ngagama
marang Jeng Nabi Sinelir

6. Muchamad Ingkang Rinasul
mungguh santosaning jurit
ingsun dhewe kang akarya
dadiya samodra getih
sanadyan wukir kepala
nora sedya sun unduri

— Diponegoro

(Translation)

4. The Pangeran (Prince) said slowly:
"So grandfather Taptajani
has the time
we agreed upon formerly already come?
The people (now) mean to wage the Holy War.
Come let us make a start!

5. I will protect them in battle
(and) the ulamas will give religious support
to destroy the Europeans and Chinese
who are in Java,
if they do not embrace the religion
of the Venerable Chosen Prophet

6. Muhammad, the Messenger of God.
As concerns steadfastness in battle,
I myself will create it,
even though there is a sea of blood
or a mountain of heads,
I will not be prepared to shrink back.

— translation Carey

=== Conversation with the Manado resident ===
Carey provided a transcription and translation following the Rusche text edition of a fragment near the ending of the Babad, detailing a dialogue between Dutch Manado colonial resident Pietermaat and his prisoner Diponegoro.

(Javanese)

322... Rĕsidhen Pitĕrmat ika
323. nuwun priksa dhumatĕng Sri Narapati / punapa kang sahab / Paduka rawuh ing ngriki / mesĕm ngandika Nalendra
324. heh Rĕsidhen lamun takon ingsun jangji / apa sira bisa / nĕkakake layangneki / marang ing Raja Wĕlonda
325. lamun saguh ya sira ingsun tuturi (turuti) / marma ingsun prapta / iya ing Mĕnadhu iki / yen tan saguh tanpa karya
326. ingsun aweh kabar yĕkti mring sireki / Rĕsidhen pan sagah / anulya dipunparingi / s(ĕ)rat malah duk wiwitan
327. ngantos prapta wĕkasan Mĕnadhu iki / Rĕsidhen Pitĕrmat / sarĕng mirsa yĕktosneki / dadya sangĕt isinira
328. sabab dene bangsanira cidra sami / panuju sagĕda / kendĕl aprang cidra iki / mĕngkana wus tan winarna

— Diponegoro

(Translation)

322... Resident Pietermaat
323. inquired of the Sultan: "What is the reason Your Highness came here?" Smiling the Sultan said:
324. "Ah, Resident, if you ask me, promise me; can you deliver this letter to the King of the Netherlands?
325. If you promise it, I will indeed tell you the reason why I came to Menado. If you cannot promise, then it is in vain
326. that I tell you the real facts." The Resident gave his pledge. Then he was given the tale from the beginning
327. until the arrival in the end in Menado. Resident Pietermaat, when he heard the truth, became extremely ashamed
328. because of the perfidy of his countrymen, how they had been able to end the war in such a treacherous fashion. We talk no more of this.

— translation Carey

== See also ==
- Diponegoro
- Java War
- Javanese literature

== Primary and related sources ==
- Dipanegara. History of Java by pangeran Dipa Nagara, in verse Or. 6547 (in Javanese). Leiden University Library. hdl:1887.1/item:3568010. 4 volumes of 408, 401, 372 and 429 pages, respectively. 22 x 18 cm, extent 934 scans.
- Babad Dipa Nagara (in Javanese). 1866. hdl:1887.1/item:357362. Buku Kedhung Kebo (Chronicle of the Buffaloes' Watering Hole), Leiden University Library Shelf mark D Or. 13. 207 scans of two pages each. Manuscript with colour illustrations.
  - PDF scan
- Pangeran Arya Dipanagara, Sěrat Babad Dipanagaran karanganipun swargi Kangjěng Pangéran Arya Dipanagara piyambak nyariosakěn wiwit kěrěmipun dhatěng agami Islam tuwin dadosing prang agěng ngantos dumiginipun kakèndhangakěn dhatěng Měnadho [Prince Arya Dipanagara, The Chronicle of Dipanagara, the heavenly king, Prince Arya Dipanagara himself tells the story from the time he accepted Islam and became a great warrior until he was forced to surrender to Menadho.] (in Javanese). Soerakarta: Albert Rusche & Co. 1908–1909. The Rusche edition was republished in 1914 and 1917. 2 volumes.
- Palmer van den Broek, W. "Babad Dipanagaran D H 589 a". Leiden: Leiden University Libraries. hdl:1887.1/item:3303001. Digital version of the Dutch translation of the Babad Dipanagaran, Leiden D H 589 a.

== Secondary literature ==
=== By Peter Carey ===
- Carey, Peter (1974). "Javanese histories of Dipanegara: The Buku Kedhung Kebo, its authorship and historical importance". Bijdragen tot de Taal-, Land- en Volkenkunde. 130 (130.2–3): 259–288. doi:10.1163/22134379-90002694. ISSN 0006-2294. OCLC 773555797.
- Carey, Peter (2008). The Power of Prophesy: Prince Dipanagara and the End of an Old Order in Java, 1785–1855 (PDF). Verhandelingen van het Koninklijk Instituut voor Taal-, Land- en Volkenkunde 249 (2nd, revised ed.). Leiden: KITLV Press. ISBN 9789067183031. OCLC 1163816168. Indonesian translation Kuasa Ramalan, Jakarta: KPG, 2012.
- Carey, Peter (2017). "Secret treasures: Prince Dipanegara in the Javanese Manuscripts". In Reeuwijk, Alexander (ed.). Voyage of discovery. Exploring the collections of the Asian library of Leiden University. Leiden: Leiden University Press. pp. 226–233. ISBN 9789087282745. OCLC 990548766. 335 pages.
- Carey, Peter B. R. (2019) [1981]. Babad Dipanagara : A Surakarta Court Poet's Account of the Outbreak of the Java War (1825-30). Vol. 9 (2nd revised ed.). Kuala Lumpur, Malaysia: Malaysian Branch of the Royal Asiatic Society. doi:10.2307/j.ctvwh8bjd. ISBN 978-967-9948-74-5. JSTOR j.ctvwh8bjd. Open access.

=== By other authors ===
- Dipa Nagara (1980). Babad Dipanegara (in Indonesian). Translated by Budiman, Amen. Semarang: Tanjung Sari. OCLC 263689090. Indonesian translation of Cantos XIV to XX.
