= Peter Carey (historian) =

British historian and author

Peter Carey MBE GOIH
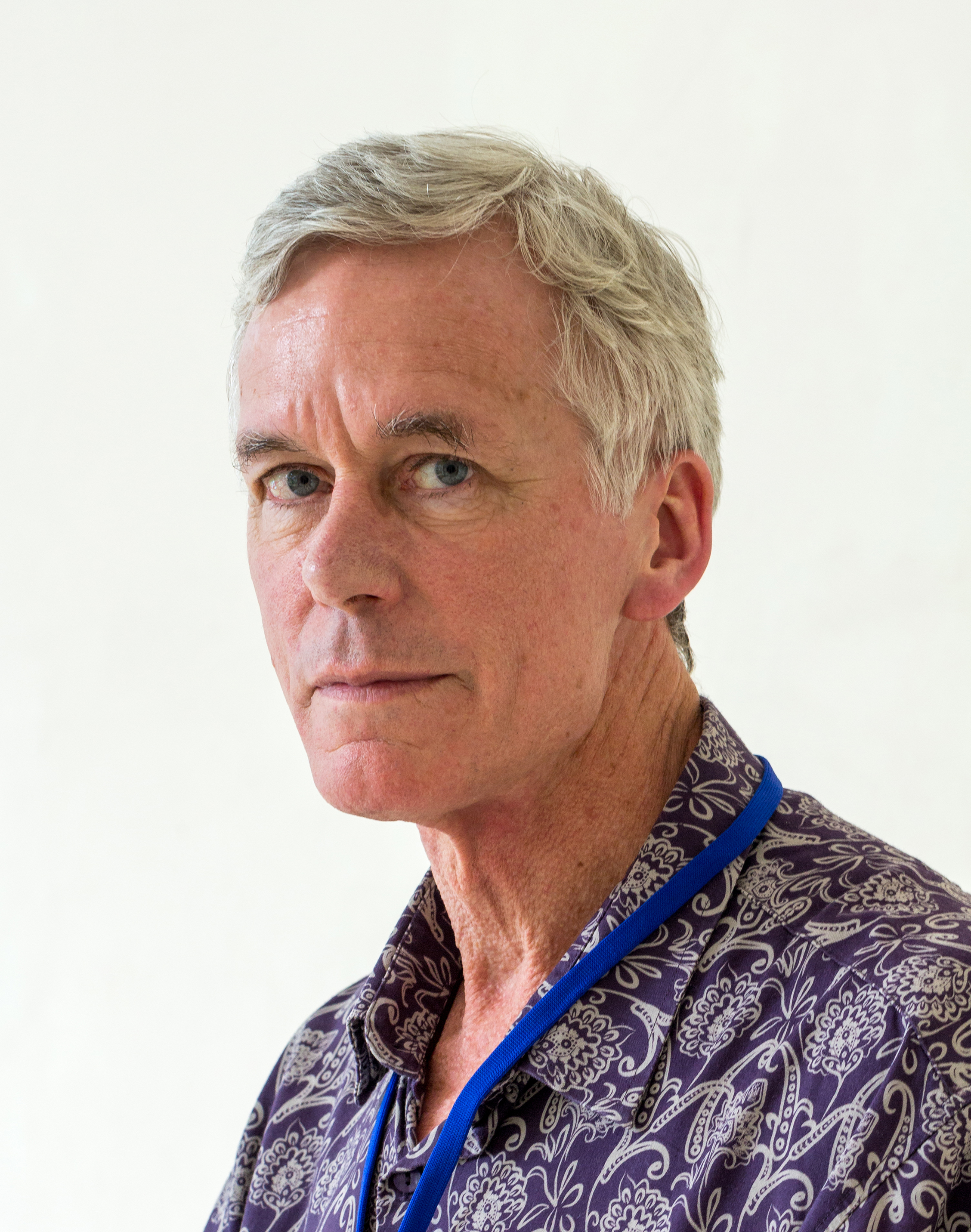
- Carey at the International Indonesia Forum in 2014
- Born: 30 April 1948 (age 78); Rangoon, Burma
- Education: Trinity College, Oxford; Cornell University
- Occupation: Historian
- Notable work: The Power of Prophecy

Peter Carey (born 30 April 1948 in Rangoon) is a British historian and author who specialises in the modern history of Indonesia, Java in particular, and has also written on East Timor and Myanmar. He was the Laithwaite fellow of Modern History at Trinity College, Oxford, from 1979 to 2008. His major early work concentrated on the history of Diponegoro, the British in Java, 1811–16 and the Java War (1825–30), on which he has published extensively. His biography of Diponegoro, The Power of Prophecy, appeared in 2007, and a succinct version, Destiny; The Life of Prince Diponegoro of Yogyakarta, 1785–1855, was published in 2014. He has conducted research in Lisbon and the United Kingdom amongst the exile East Timorese student community for an oral history of the Indonesian occupation of East Timor, 1975–99, part of which was published in the Cornell University journal Indonesia (no. 76 [October 2003], pp. 23–67).

Before moving to Indonesia, Carey regularly commented on the history and politics of Southeast Asia to the British media. He was adjunct professor at the Department of Humanities of the University of Indonesia in Jakarta (2013-2023), and earlier served as Indonesia country director of the Cambodia Trust (2008–2012), a UK disability charity that he co-founded in November 1989 to address the needs of mine victims in Cambodia.

== Early life and education ==
Carey was born to British businessman Thomas Brian Carey and his wife Wendy in Rangoon, Burma on 30 April 1948. At the age of seven he and his family moved to the United Kingdom.

In 1969, Carey passed his BA degree in modern history from Trinity College, Oxford, with First Class Honors. He continued on an English Speaking Union scholarship to Cornell University in Ithaca, New York, studying there from 1969 to 1970. While at Cornell, Carey found out about the Javanese prince Diponegoro, who led a five-year war against the Dutch colonial government in the East Indies from 1825 to 1830. He later recalled that his interest in the prince was sparked by Diponegoro's closeness to the common people, despite his noble background.

Between 1971 and 1973 he stayed in Indonesia, completing research into Diponegoro for his doctoral thesis. He graduated in 1976, with a thesis entitled "Dipanagara and the Making of the Java War: Yogyakarta History, 1785–1825".

== Career ==
Carey taught at Oxford, first being elected to a Prize Fellowship at Magdalen College in 1974. He served there until 1979, when he became the Laithwaite fellow and tutor in modern history at Trinity College.

Carey has also been described as a friend of Burmese pro-democracy leader Aung San Suu Kyi and of her husband Michael Aris. He appeared in the 2010 Danish documentary Aung San Suu Kyi: Lady of No Fear by Anne Gyrithe Bonne, in which he commented on Suu Kyi's years in Oxford and her early political outlook, as well as in the 2012 BBC Two This World film Aung San Suu Kyi: The Choice.

In 2006, he was made a grand officer in the Order of Prince Henry the Navigator by the government of Portugal. Carey took early retirement in 2008 and moved to Indonesia.

Carey appeared in a film, Prabowo: Sang Patriot (Prabowo: The Patriot), promoting Prabowo Subianto, a candidate in the 2014 Indonesian presidential election. In the film, Prabowo is presented as having an illustrious family with at least two family members having assisted Diponegoro during the Java War, and Carey praises the self-sacrifice of these two ancestors. However, Carey later stated that the footage of his interview on Prabowo's ancestry had been taken from an entirely separate interview on the Java War without his permission. He then requested that Gerindra both remove his scenes, which was done, and withdraw the film, which was not. This attracted criticism. One critic claimed that Carey was "selling his soul", and another scholar asserted that Carey has a longstanding and close relationship with Prabowo, that Carey had not asked to be removed from the movie and that Carey had been vague and obfuscating and introduced irrelevancies in defending his appearance in the film. Carey responded, maintaining that his words had been taken out of context and pointing out that his original interview had not been done as a piece of political propaganda, but as an historical reflection on the impact of the Java War on Indonesian society. At no point in the original interview was any question asked about Prabowo, whom Carey only met six years later in 2020.

Carey lives in his house on a quiet hillside in the West of Ireland, where he is involved in a project to translate the Babad Diponegoro (Chronicle of Diponegoro, the prince’s autobiography) into English and is writing a historical novel on the famous 16th-century queen of Jepara, Ratu Kalinyamat (r. 1549–79). Aside from his continued studies into Javanese culture, he is involved in a project to put all his archival notes on the Yogyakarta Residency archive in the Indonesian National Archives online at www.archive.org. This grew out of his 1978-2000 project to transliterate and translate the Javanese-language texts looted by the British from Yogyakarta in June 1812 under the auspices of the British Academy. He is currently involved in heritage issues, and co-curated the "Diponegoro Room," a permanent exhibit in the Jakarta History Museum (Museum Sejarah Jakarta, Taman Fatahillah), which was opened by the Governor of Jakarta, Anies Baswedan, on 1 April 2019, and is now (2023–25) undergoing extensive renovation. He is also involved in curating and editing the 1830 Project of Tulisan, an initiative related to the Babad Diponegoro.

== Academic career ==
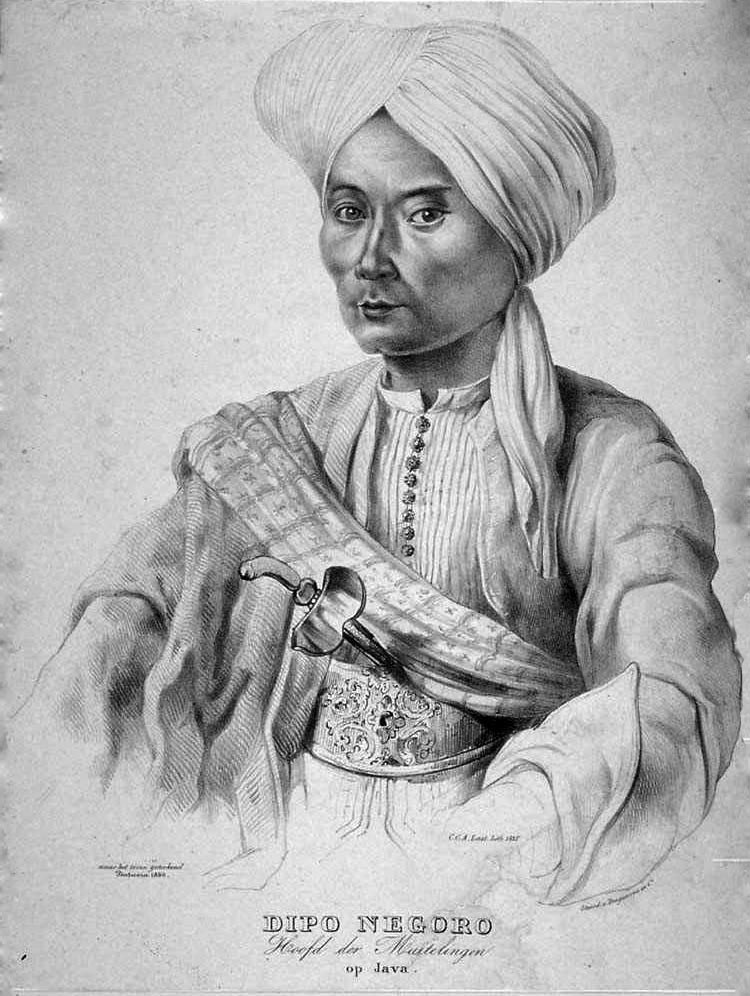
An 1835 lithograph of Diponegoro, the focus of many of Carey's academic works

Carey has published on Javanese culture and history, as well as on the histories of Burma and East Timor. His "fascination" is with the 19th-century prince Diponegoro, and by 1983 he was established as "an authority on the Java War (1825-30)". He has written several books on the prince, including a translation and analysis of the Babad Dipanegara (Diponegoro Chronicles) titled Babad Dipanagara: An Account of the Outbreak of the Java War and a biography of the prince, The Power of Prophecy: Prince Dipanagara and the End of an Old Order in Java, 1785–1855. In a 2014 interview, Carey said that, "In every journey and trial Diponegoro faced, he did not lose his spirit. He still maintained his creativity and his humanity by becoming a writer, a leader, a statesman, a mystic, a clean administrator who was scrupulous in his financial dealings and benefitted the tenants and farming communities under his authority."

Babad Dipanagara: An Account of the Outbreak of the Java War, published in 1981, is based in part on Carey's doctoral thesis. It presents a romanised transcription of the Surakarta court version of the Babad Diponegoro, faced with an English-language translation; an Indonesian translation is included after the transcription and English text. The book opens with a 60-page introduction that discusses the manuscript and text, including a review of contemporary literature related to the Java War, and closes with 30 pages of notes, glossaries, bibliography, index and maps. Reviewing for the Bulletin of the School of Oriental and African Studies, Heather Sutherland described the book as "a pleasure to read" and a tribute to its publisher. The English used, she found, was "clear and smooth, if not poetic", and the interspersing of "valuable, scattered information" in the notes led readers to become "impatient" for a social history of Java. She concluded that the book was "exemplary", and its usefulness and origin as a "by-product of a major research effort" became "a tribute to Carey's careful scholarship and historical imagination".

The 2007 publication The Power of Prophecy: Prince Dipanagara and the End of an Old Order in Java, 1785–1855 is an almost thousand-page biography of Diponegoro, including his rarely discussed exile in Manado and Makassar. There is also extensive discussion of related topics, which both presents Carey's analysis and provides sufficient references to let readers draw their own conclusions. Amrit Gomperts, reviewing for the Bijdragen tot de Taal-, Land- en Volkenkunde, described it as "impressive", an "outstanding and authoritative study on the background of the Java War and Diponegoro's life" written in a style which "will hold the reader's attention until the last page". Gomperts differed only on the discussion of Diponegoro's adopted title Sultan Erucakra, writing that "By taking up ... the epithet of Erucakra (literally, 'arrows and discus'), Diponegoro may have intended to underline the belligerent nature of his proclaimed kingship", and emphasising that the prince had used arrows and a shield as his coat of arms.

== Honours ==
- January 2006 – Grand Officer of the Order of Prince Henry the Navigator (GOIH), awarded by the President of Portugal for services to Portugal in Timor-Leste.
- 2010 (invested June 2011) – Member of the Order of the British Empire (MBE), awarded in the 2010 Birthday Honours by Queen Elizabeth II for "services to the disabled of South East Asia".
- November 2020 – Anugerah Kebudayaan (Cultural Award) from the Governor of Yogyakarta, Sultan Hamengku Buwono X, in the "Budayawan" (Cultural Figure) category, recognising his contributions to the study and promotion of Javanese and Indonesian culture. The Sultan noted that it was the first time the award had been given to a foreign expert.
- October 2025 – Anugerah Kebudayaan Indonesia (Indonesian Cultural Award), awarded by the Ministry of Culture for services to Indonesian culture (history and literature).
- November 2025 – Collar of the Order of Timor-Leste, awarded by the President of Timor-Leste (José Ramos-Horta) for services to Timor-Leste.

== Bibliography ==
- 1974 – The Cultural Ecology of Early Nineteenth Century Java (Singapore: Institute of South East Asian Studies / ISEAS) (Indonesian translation, Sisi Lain Diponegoro: Buku Kedung Kebo dan Historiografi Perang Jawa, Jakarta: Kepustakaan Populer Gramedia, 2017)
- 1980 – The Archive of Yogyakarta, Vol. 1: Documents Relating to Politics and Internal Court Affairs (London: British Academy / Oxford University Press)
- 1981 – Babad Dipanagara: An Account of the Outbreak of the Java War (1825–1830) (Kuala Lumpur: Art Printers for the Malaysian Branch of the Royal Asiatic Society; extensively revised edition 2019)
- 1986 – Maritime Southeast Asian Studies in the United Kingdom: A Survey of Their Post-War Development and Current Resources (Oxford: JASO)
- 1988 – with Colin Wild (eds.), Born in Fire: The Indonesian Struggle for Independence. An Anthology (Athens, Ohio: Swallow Press; Indonesian ed. Jakarta: Penerbit Buku Kompas, 2024)
- 1988 – Voyage à Djokja-Karta en 1825: The Outbreak of the Java War as Seen by a Painter (Paris: Association Archipel; Indonesian ed. Catatan Perjalananku ke Yogyakarta Tahun 1825, Jakarta: KPG)
- 1992 – The British in Java, 1811–16: A Javanese Account (London: Oxford University Press for the British Academy) (Indonesian translation, Inggris di Jawa, 1811–1816, Jakarta: Penerbit Buku Kompas, 2017; rev. 2019; 4th rev. 2026)
- 1994 – with Wendy Lambourne and Sue Rabbitt Roff, East Timor: A Bibliography, 1970–1993 (Canberra: Australian National University)
- 1995 – with G. Carter Bentley (eds.), East Timor at the Crossroads: The Forging of a Nation (London: Cassell)
- 1995 – with Steve Cox, Generations of Resistance: East Timor (London: Cassell)
- 1996 – East Timor: Third World Colonialism and the Struggle for National Identity (London: Research Institute for the Study of Conflict and Terrorism)
- 1997 – Burma: The Challenge of Change in a Divided Society (Basingstoke: Macmillan)
- 2000 – with Mason C. Hoadley (eds.), The Archive of Yogyakarta, Vol. 2: Documents Relating to Economic and Agrarian Affairs (Oxford: Oxford University Press for the British Academy)
- 2004 – Asal Usul Perang Jawa: Pemberontakan Sepoy dan Raden Saleh (Yogyakarta: LKiS)
- 2007 – The Power of Prophecy: Prince Dipanagara and the End of an Old Order in Java, 1785–1855 (Leiden: KITLV Press; 2nd rev. ed. 2008) (Indonesian transl. Kuasa Ramalan, Jakarta: KPG, 2012)
- 2014 – Destiny: The Life of Prince Diponegoro of Yogyakarta 1785–1855 (Oxford: Peter Lang) (Indonesian transl. Takdir: Riwayat Pangeran Diponegoro, Jakarta: Penerbit Buku Kompas)
- 2021 – with Farish A. Noor (eds.), Racial Difference and the Colonial Wars of 19th Century Southeast Asia (Amsterdam: Amsterdam University Press) (Indonesian transl. Ras, Kuasa dan Kekerasan Kolonial di Hindia Belanda, 1808–1830, Jakarta: KPG, 2022)
- 2022 – Outsider Insiders: Four Officers’ Exile Conversations with Diponegoro, 1830–1837 (Bijdragen tot de Taal-, Land- en Volkenkunde, 178: 440–476; Indonesian ed. Percakapan Dengan Diponegoro, Jakarta: KPG, 2022)
- 2026 – with Taufiq Hakim (eds.), Mistisisme di Balik Perang Jawa: Membaca Dua Karya Tasawuf Diponegoro (Jakarta: KPG)

== Documentary appearances ==
- 2010 – Aung San Suu Kyi: Lady of No Fear – Directed by Anne Gyrithe Bonne.
- 2012 – Aung San Suu Kyi: The Choice – A BBC Two This World documentary.
- 2014 – Prabowo: Sang Patriot – Prabowo: The Patriot.

== Works cited ==
- Gomperts, Amrit (2008). "The Power of Prophecy; Prince Dipanagara and the End of an Old Order in Java, 1785-1855. [Verhandelingen 249.] by Peter Carey". Bijdragen tot de Taal-, Land- en Volkenkunde. 164 (2/3). Royal Netherlands Institute of Southeast Asian and Caribbean Studies: 312–314. JSTOR 27868492. (subscription required)
- Sutherland, Heather (1983). "Babad Dipanagara. An Account of the Outbreak of the Java War (1825-1830): The Surakarta Court Version of the Babad Dipanagara with Translations into English and Indonesian Malay by P. B. R. Carey". Bulletin of the School of Oriental and African Studies. 46 (2). Cambridge University Press: 393–395. doi:10.1017/s0041977x00079477. JSTOR 615452. (subscription required)
