= Satrio Piningit =

Mythical figure

Satrio Piningit (Gedrik Javanese: Satriå Pininģit, Javanese Hanacaraka: ꦱꦠꦿꦶꦪꦺꦴꦥꦶꦤꦶꦔꦶꦠ꧀; meaning "Solitude Knight / Solitude Kshatriya"), also called Ratu Adil (Javanese Hanacaraka: ꦫꦠꦸꦄꦢꦶꦭ꧀, Indonesian: Raja yang Adil; meaning "King of Justice"), is a Javanese apocalyptic main character described in Jongko Joyobhoyo (Jayabaya Prophecies) and by the 19th century poet Ranggawarsita as a mythical figure who would become a great leader of Nusantara (modern-day Indonesia), ruling the world from Java. Satrio Piningit has similarities to apocalyptic characters in other traditions around the world, such as the Messiah (Judaism and Christianity), Maitreya (Buddhism), and the Mahdi (Islam).

== Jongko Joyoboyo (Jayabaya Prophecies) ==
Maharaja Jayabaya was a King of Kediri in East Java from 1135 to 1157 A.D. known for his righteousness and prosperity, and was reputed to have been an incarnation of the Hindu deity, Vishnu (Javanese: Dhewo Wisnu / ꦢꦼꦮꦺꦴꦮꦶꦱ꧀ꦤꦸ, Indonesian: Dewa Wisnu) inheriting a sort of magical strength (which Javanese called sakti manduroguno). It was also believed that he was able to predict the future.

Maharaja Jayabaya is most famous for his oracles, most prophecies were attributed to him, namely the Serat Joyobhoyo Musoror, Serat Pranitiwekyo, as well as others considered debatable amongst scholars. Jayabaya is also attributed as an author of the "Pralembang Joyobhoyo", a prophetic book which played an important role in mind control during the Japanese occupation of the Dutch East Indies (1942–1945).

According to a selectively abridged set of stanzas within a Jayabaya prophecy (those all are extremely long epic poems):

"The Javanese would be ruled by whites for 3 centuries and by yellow dwarfs for the life span of a maize plant prior to the return of the Ratu Adil: whose the name must contain at least one syllable of the Javanese Noto Nogoro."

When Japan occupied the Dutch East Indies, in the first weeks of 1942, Indonesians came down in the streets shouting out to the Japanese army as the fulfillment of the prophecy ascribed to Joyoboyo, who foretold the day when white men would one day establish their rule on Java and tyrannize the people for hundreds of years – but they would be driven out by the arrival of yellow men from the north. These yellow dwarfs, Joyoboyo had predicted, would remain in power for one crop cycle, and after that Java would be freed from foreign domination. To most of the Javanese, Japan was a liberator; the prophecy had been fulfilled.

== Jayabaya Prophecy of Satrio Piningit ==
King Jayabaya predicted that Satrio Piningit would become a Great Leader of Nusantara. He wrote that Satrio Piningit would be a descendant of Majapahit's royal family, an intelligent king, honest, and righteous. He would uphold justice around the world from Java after a conquest of Nusantara, being known as "Ratu Adil" (Indonesian: King of Justice, in Javanese, "Ratu" means "King" or "Queen"). It is believed that Ratu Adil has eight exceptional qualities identified as Hastabrata, symbolized by the sun, moon, stars, earth, ocean, wind, fire, and water.

According to Jayabaya, in the course of Satrio Piningit's life, he would experience misery, always be humiliated, unlucky, and "kesapar" (poor). Therefore, he has the nickname "Satrio Wiragung" (The Great Ksatria) due to his sincerity. Most Javanese people believe this prophecy.

Satrio Piningit would not have served as a kind of Head of State (President or King) but in a greater position, surely conquering the world before the apocalypse. He would not be elected, nor ask to be elected, instead leading a massive revolution. The last verses of Jongko Joyobhoyo write about the coming day of Satrio Piningit being preceded by many disasters, occurring in a post-apocalyptic world.

=== Verses about Satrio Piningit ===
꧇꧑꧔꧐꧇꧉ꦥꦺꦴꦭꦲꦼꦮꦺꦴꦁꦗꦺꦴꦮꦺꦴꦏꦺꦴꦪꦺꦴꦒꦧꦃꦢꦷꦤ꧀ꦠꦺꦫꦶ꧈ꦲꦺꦤ꧀ꦢꦶꦱꦶꦁꦧꦺꦤꦺꦂꦲꦺꦤ꧀ꦢꦶꦱꦶꦁꦱꦺꦗꦠꦶ꧈ꦥꦺꦴꦫꦺꦴꦠꦺꦴꦥꦺꦴꦥꦺꦴꦢꦺꦴꦲꦺꦴꦫꦮꦤꦶ꧈ꦥꦺꦴꦢꦺꦴꦮꦺꦢꦶꦔꦗꦫꦏꦼꦥꦶꦮꦸꦭꦁꦲꦢꦶ꧈ꦱꦭꦃꦱꦭꦃꦲꦤꦺꦩꦤꦶꦥꦠꦶ꧉

140. polahe wong Jowo koyo gabah diinteri, endi sing bener endi sing sejati, poro topo podo ora wani, podo wedi ngajarake piwulang adi, salah-salah anemani pati.

Translation:

the behavior of Javanese is such grain sowing, no one true, no one real, all hermits dare not, afraid to express the true teachings, the death wilt actually cometh those folk up.

꧇꧑꧔꧑꧇꧉ꦧꦚ꧀ꦗꦶꦂꦧꦤ꧀ꦢꦁꦲꦺꦴꦤꦺꦴꦔꦺꦤ꧀ꦢꦶꦲꦺꦤ꧀ꦢꦶ꧈ꦒꦸꦤꦸꦁꦚ꧀ꦗꦺꦧ꧀ꦭꦸꦒ꧀ꦠꦤ꧀ꦲꦚ꧀ꦗꦂꦮꦤꦶ꧈ꦠꦤ꧀ꦲꦔꦶꦩ꧀ꦥꦺꦤꦶ꧈ꦒꦺꦃꦠꦶꦔꦼꦏꦺꦥꦠꦶꦥꦠꦶꦩꦫꦁꦥꦤ꧀ꦢꦶꦠꦺꦴꦏꦁꦲꦺꦴꦊꦃꦥꦠꦶꦒꦺꦤꦶ꧈ꦩꦂꦒꦺꦴꦮꦺꦢꦶꦏꦥꦶꦪꦏ꧀ꦮꦺꦢꦶꦤꦼꦱꦺꦴꦥꦺꦴꦱꦶꦫꦺꦴꦱꦶꦁꦱꦪꦺꦏ꧀ꦠꦶ꧉

141. banjir bandhang ono ngendhi-endhi, gunung njeblug tan anjarwani, tan angimpeni, gehtinge kepati-pati marang pandito kang oleh pati geni, margo wedhi kapiyak wedhine sopo siro sing sayekti.

Translation:

flash floods occur in everywhere, mounts erupt suddenly, thither is no notification, it all very much hates a false meditate priest without eating and sleeping, because the priest is afraid his secret would beest uncovered.

Some characteristics of Satrio Piningit are described in chapter 159 (as well as in Wayang Story):

꧇꧑꧕꧙꧇꧉ꦱꦺꦭꦺꦠ꧀ꦱꦺꦭꦺꦠꦼꦪꦼꦤ꧀ꦩ꧀ꦧꦺꦱꦸꦏ꧀ꦔꦚ꧀ꦕꦶꦏ꧀ꦠꦸꦠꦸꦥꦶꦁꦠꦲꦸꦤ꧀꧈ꦱꦶꦤꦸꦁꦏꦭꦤ꧀ꦢꦼꦮꦺꦴꦮꦺꦴꦭꦸ꧈ꦔꦺꦱ꧀ꦠꦺꦴꦩꦁꦒꦭꦤꦶꦁꦫꦠꦸ꧈ꦧꦏꦭ꧀ꦲꦺꦴꦤꦺꦴꦢꦼꦮꦺꦴꦔꦺꦗꦮꦤ꧀ꦠꦃ꧈ꦲꦥꦺꦔꦮꦏ꧀ꦩꦤꦸꦁꦱꦺꦴ꧈ꦲꦺꦴꦥꦺꦴꦱꦸꦂꦪꦺꦴꦥꦺꦴꦝꦺꦴꦧꦺꦠꦺꦴꦫꦺꦴꦏꦿꦺꦱ꧀ꦤꦺꦴ꧈ꦲꦮꦠꦏ꧀ꦧꦺꦴꦭꦺꦴꦢꦼꦮꦺꦴ꧈ꦲꦒꦺꦒꦩꦤ꧀ꦠꦿꦶꦱꦸꦭꦺꦴꦮꦼꦢꦺꦴ꧈ꦗꦶꦤꦺꦗꦼꦂꦮꦺꦴꦭꦏ꧀ꦮꦭꦶꦏꦶꦁꦗꦩꦤ꧀꧈ꦮꦺꦴꦁꦚꦶꦭꦶꦃꦩ꧀ꦨꦊꦏꦏꦼ꧈ꦮꦺꦴꦁꦲꦸꦠꦁꦩ꧀ꦧꦪꦉ꧈ꦲꦸꦠꦁꦚꦺꦴꦮꦺꦴꦚꦻꦴꦂꦚꦺꦴꦮꦺꦴ꧈ꦲꦸꦠꦁꦮꦶꦫꦁꦚꦻꦴꦂꦮꦶꦫꦁ꧉

159. selet-selete yen mbesuk ngancik tutuping tahun, sinungkalan dewo wolu, ngesto manggalaning ratu, bakal ono dewo ngejawantah, apengawak manungso, oposuryo podho Betoro Kresno, awatak Bolodewo, agegaman trisulo wedo, jinejer wolak-waliking jaman, wong nyilih mbhalekake, wong utang mbayare, utang nyawa bayar nyowo, utang wirang nyaur wirang.

Translation:

at the latest, after the end of the year (before the end of the world), it would cometh down a god (dhewo/deva/dewa) who becometh the King who hath the human body, his face is like a Batara Krishna, his character is like a Baladewa, his weapon is Trisula Wedha, that is the signs of the changing times, each gent returneth their loans, payeth their debts, liveth for a liveth, shy for a shy.

And events before his advent, depicted in chapter 161:

꧇꧑꧖꧑꧇꧉ꦢꦸꦤꦸꦔꦤꦼꦲꦺꦴꦤꦺꦴꦱꦶꦏꦶꦭ꧀ꦫꦺꦢꦶꦭꦮꦸꦱꦶꦱꦶꦃꦮꦼꦠꦤ꧀꧈ꦮꦼꦠꦤꦺꦧꦺꦔꦮꦤ꧀ꦧꦚꦸ꧈ꦲꦤ꧀ꦢꦺꦢꦸꦏꦸꦃꦥꦶꦤ꧀ꦝꦺꦴꦫꦢꦺꦤ꧀ꦒꦠꦺꦴꦠ꧀ꦏꦺꦴꦕꦺꦴ꧈ꦲꦫꦸꦥꦺꦴꦥꦒꦸꦥꦺꦴꦤ꧀ꦢꦺꦴꦫꦺꦴꦠꦸꦤ꧀ꦢꦺꦴꦠꦶꦒꦺꦴ꧈ꦏꦺꦴꦪꦺꦴꦩꦤꦸꦁꦱꦺꦴꦲꦔ꧀ꦭꦺꦭꦺꦝꦺꦴ꧉

161. dunungane ono sikil redhi Lawu sisih wetan, wetane bengawan banyu, andhedukuh pindho Radhen Gatotkoco, arupa pagupon doro tundho tigo, koyo manungsa angleledho.

Translation:

(Satrio Piningit) would cometh from the eastern foothill of Mount Lawu, east of the river (Bengawan), his house is like a Raden Gatotkaca's, like a three-layered pigeon cage, such human teasing.

=== Character interpretation and claimants ===
In Javanese history, there are several examples or episodes that in the time of chaos, injustice, or great peril, a man from an unassuming background or unpredicted position, could successfully rise, seized the power, and become the Ratu (Javanese term equate to "Leader/Ruler"). This historic figures among others includes Airlangga the King of Kahuripan, Ken Angrok, the founder of Rajasa dynasty of Singhasari, and Raden Wijaya, the founder of Majapahit.

The mantle of Ratu Adil has been applied to a number of persons in recent Indonesian history, including Prince Diponegoro, Sultan Hamengkubuwono IX, Tjokroaminoto, President Sukarno, and Dutch military officer Raymond Westerling (Legion of the Just Ruler).

During the Japanese occupation which took over the Dutch East Indies in Sumatra and Java, most Javanese people believed that Japanese were the Awaited Satrio Piningit. However, Japan oppressed the people and Satrio Piningit was prophesied to be Javanese, not Japanese.

In 1951-1964 around Paniai Lakes there was a messianic movement called Wege, consisting primarily of Ekari people who believed of a Ratu Adil figure from Java that will come to bring wealth and found a "Kingdom of Happiness". The movement was based on the local folktale of Situgumina, a figure with the knowledge of life and death and the knowledge of the world's treasures, who would return after his voyage to Java. The leader of this movement was Zacheus Pakage, a local village elder and former preacher that had studied in Kebo, Enarotali, and Kemah Injili Church in Unjungpandang and helped missionaries in Moni, Uhunduni, and Dani. He experienced discrimination by Dutch authority towards missionaries, as he did not receive salaries for his service. Members of the movement prepared for the second coming of a Ratu Adil by constructing secret barracks and secluded communities in the forest and participated in ceremonies for weeks and advocated for gotong-royong. Dutch colonial authority would stop this movement in 1954 and sentenced Zacheus Pakage to prison and mental institution. This resulted in numerous revolts by the Agadide community who believed killing Dutch local authorities would cause them to recognize defeat and leave. This, along with rumours that white pigs from Dutch authorities caused whooping coughs, resulted in escalating tension and led to the Obano uprising in 1956–1957.

In the post-independence era, most Javanese people believe that Sukarno was Satrio Piningit. They claimed that Sukarno's character was quite similar to Satrio Piningit's. Other Indonesians do not believe it due to the prophecy by which Satrio Piningit would become a leader of the entire world, not only of Indonesia, and some Java-centric ethnic issues are also considered to reject this claim. Also, at the end of Sukarno's reign he was treated unfairly by the New Order (1967–1998), starting from the rejection of Sukarno by the MPRS in 1966.

Recently some Javanese sociologists considered Joko Widodo (7th President of Indonesia) as Satrio Piningit which became a point of debate during presidential election. Some of his opponents argued that branding Joko Widodo as Satrio Piningit was just propaganda in order to influence the election.

Later, a Dutch-Indonesian Pencak Silat pioneer, Rudy Terlinden, gave his pencak silat style the name of Ratu Adil. In his belief, the Javanese mythology of Ratu Adil is christened as Jesus Christ.

Jayabaya's prophecy only tells about Satrio Piningit's rise from Java. He would lead Nusantara and at last, he would rule the world. Jayabaya does not tell about the post-Satrio Piningit era which is considered a post-apocalyptic world. Therefore, the identity of Satrio Piningit is open to various interpretations. The Javanese believe Satrio Piningit should be a formal head of state (such as king or president).

== See also ==
- Kejawen
- Maharaja Jayabaya
- Wayang and Pewayangan
- Culture of Indonesia
- Javanese people
- Messiah
- Imam Mahdi
- Kalki
- Maitreya
