= Jayabaya =

Jayabhaya

King of Kediri
- Reign: 1135-1159
- Successor: Sarvesvara
- Died: 1179; Pamenang, Kingdom of Kadiri
- Issue: Jaya Amijaya; Devi Pramesti; Devi Pramuni; Devi Sasanti
Regnal name
- Sang Mapañji Jayabhaya Srī Varmmesvara Madhusūdanāwatārānandita Suhrtsingha Parakrama Digjayotunggadeva
- House: Isyana
- Religion: Hindu Buddhist

Jayabhaya or Jayabaya (Javanese spelled: Ratu Joyoboyo), was the Javanese king of the Kediri Kingdom in East Java, Indonesia, who ruled from around 1135 to 1159 CE. He is also the grandfather of the legendary hero, Angling Dharma. With the title of abhiseka used is Sri Maharaja Sang Mapanji Jayabhaya Sri Warmeswara Madhusudana Awataranindita Suhtrisingha Parakrama Uttunggadewa. The reign of King Jayabhaya is considered the zenith of the Kediri Kingdom.

King Jayabaya is credited with the reunification of the Kediri Kingdom following a division caused by the death of his predecessor, Airlangga. Known for his just and prosperous rule, King Jayabaya was reputed to be an incarnation of the Hindu deity Vishnu. He epitomized the archetypal Ratu Adil, the just king who is reborn during a "Jaman Edan" (Era of Madness)—a dark age of suffering—to restore Jaman Raharja: a time of social justice, order, and harmony. The Javanese believed in a cyclical history, where epochs of prosperity (Jaman Raharja) are followed by eras of suffering (Jaman Edan), eventually returning to prosperity again.

Jayabaya named his kingdom Widarba, meaning "a thousand cities," centered in Pamenang, modern-day Kediri Regency. Records, blending fact and myth, indicate that his father, Gendrayana the Revolutionary, claimed descent from the Pandavas. He was said to be the son of Yudayana, son of Parikshit, son of Abhimanyu, son of Arjuna, from the Pandava lineage.

From Jayabaya's queen consort, Dewi Sara, he had four daughters: Jaya Amijaya, Dewi Pramesti, Dewi Pramuni, and Dewi Sasanti. Jaya Amijaya married King Astradarma Pramesti Yawastina, with whom she bore Malawapati, the King of Anglingdarma.

In his old age, Jayabaya abdicated and chose a life of meditation as a Hindu recluse, seeking moksha (spiritual liberation) and embracing his role as an incarnation of Vishnu. He retreated to the village of Menang, in the Pagu sub-district of Kediri Regency, which remains a revered pilgrimage site according to the Kejawen belief system. In later history, both Sukarno and Suharto meditated extensively in Menang to seek an aura of kingly legitimacy, supernatural abilities and Jayabaya's blessings or powers.

== Prophecies ==
A 1932 edition of the Serat Jayabaya

Ratu Jayabaya is most famous for the oracles or prophecies attributed to him, including the Serat Jayabaya Musarar, Serat Pranitiwakya, and some others that remain debated. The mangala (prologue) of the renowned Kakawin Bhāratayuddha names King Jayabaya as the patron of the two poets, Mpu Sedah and Mpu Panuluh, who authored the work. Jayabaya is also credited as the author of the Prelambang Jayabaya, a prophetic book that played an influential role during the Japanese occupation.

According to a selectively abridged set of stanzas within a Jayabaya prophecy (as all are extremely long epic poems):

The Javanese would be ruled by whites for 3 centuries and by yellow dwarfs for the life span of a maize plant prior to the return of the Ratu Adil: whose name must contain at least one syllable of the Javanese Nata Nagara.

When Japan occupied the Netherlands East Indies in the early weeks of 1942, many Indonesians celebrated, seeing the Japanese army as the fulfillment of a prophecy attributed to Jayabaya. He had foretold a time when white men would establish their rule over Java and oppress the people for many years, only to be driven out by "yellow men from the north." According to Jayabaya, these "yellow dwarves" would remain for one crop cycle (interpreted as 3 1/2 years, corresponding to the duration of Japanese occupation), after which Java would be free from foreign domination. To most Javanese, Japan was seen as a liberator, as the prophecy appeared to be fulfilled.

The Japanese freed Indonesian nationalists from Dutch prisons and employed them as civil servants and administrators. By late 1944, however, it became clear that Japan could not win the war. On 9 August 1945, Japan officially transferred its authority to Indonesia to prepare for independence, and the commander of Japan's Southeast Asian forces appointed future President Sukarno as chairman of the preparatory committee for Indonesian independence. As one account of Indonesian history notes, “With the minor exception that three crops had been harvested, Jayabaya’s prophecy had been realized.”

Many believe that the time for the arrival of a new Ratu Adil is near, as the prophecies foretell: “when iron wagons drive without horses and ships sail through the sky.” This figure is expected to rescue and reunite Indonesia after a period of acute crisis, ushering in a new golden age.

Anthropologist Martin Ramstedt speculates that the popularity of the millenarian prophecy concerning the return of Jayabaya as a Ratu Adil contributed to General Suharto's decision to suppress kebatinan movements as part of his persecution of alleged PKI members, leading to the mass-killing of 1965–66. Ramstedt provides several reasons for this conclusion. The prophecy of the return of a Ratu Adil was widely popular among followers of kebatinan groups, many of whom were also supporters of the PKI. Although Suharto himself showed some affinity for kebatinan practices, he deeply distrusted their loyalty to him. Additionally, Suharto was aware that his predecessor Sukarno was identified as a Ratu Adil, while Suharto himself was not, making this prophecy a potential threat to his legitimacy.

Preceded by Bamesvara	Monarch of Kediri Kingdom; 1135-1157	Succeeded by Sarvesvara
