= Diponegoro =

Javanese prince (1785–1855)

- Sultan Abdul Hamid Herucakra Amirul Mukminin Sayyidin Panatagama Kalifatullah ing Tanah Jawa
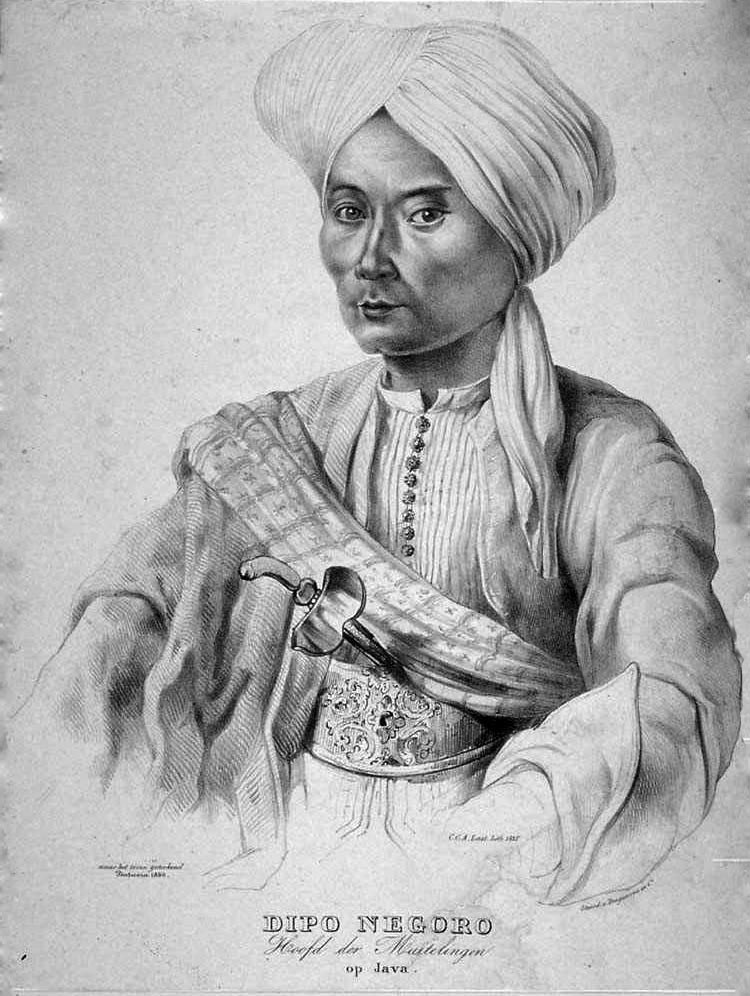
- Portrait of Prince Diponegoro, 1835
- Born: 11 November 1785; Yogyakarta, Yogyakarta Sultanate
- Died: 8 January 1855 (aged 69); Oedjoeng Pandang, Dutch East Indies
- Spouse: Kedhaton; Ratnaningsih; Ratnaningrum
- Issue: 22
- House: Mataram
- Father: Hamengkubuwono III
- Mother: Mangkarawati
- Religion: Islam

Prince Diponegoro (Javanese: ꦢꦶꦥꦤꦼꦒꦫ, romanized: Dipånegårå; born Bendara Raden Mas Mustahar, ꦧꦼꦤ꧀ꦢꦫꦫꦢꦺꦤ꧀ꦩꦱ꧀ꦩꦸꦱ꧀ꦠꦲꦂ; later Bendara Raden Mas Antawirya, ꦧꦼꦤ꧀ꦢꦫꦫꦢꦺꦤ꧀ꦩꦱ꧀ꦲꦤ꧀ꦠꦮꦶꦂꦪ; 11 November 1785 – 8 January 1855), also known as Dipanegara and Dipa Negara, was a Javanese prince who opposed the Dutch colonial rule. The eldest son of the Yogyakarta Sultan Hamengkubuwono III, he played an important role in the Java War between 1825 and 1830. After his defeat and capture, he was exiled to Makassar, where he died at 69 years old.

His five-year struggle against the Dutch control of Java has become celebrated by Indonesians throughout the years, acting as a source of inspiration for the fighters in the Indonesian National Revolution and nationalism in modern-day Indonesia among others. He is a national hero in Indonesia.

== Early life ==
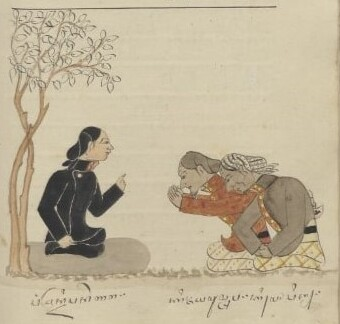
Prince Dipanegara instructs his followers for their pilgrimage, Babad Dipa Nagara, p. 162-163, Indonesia 1866.

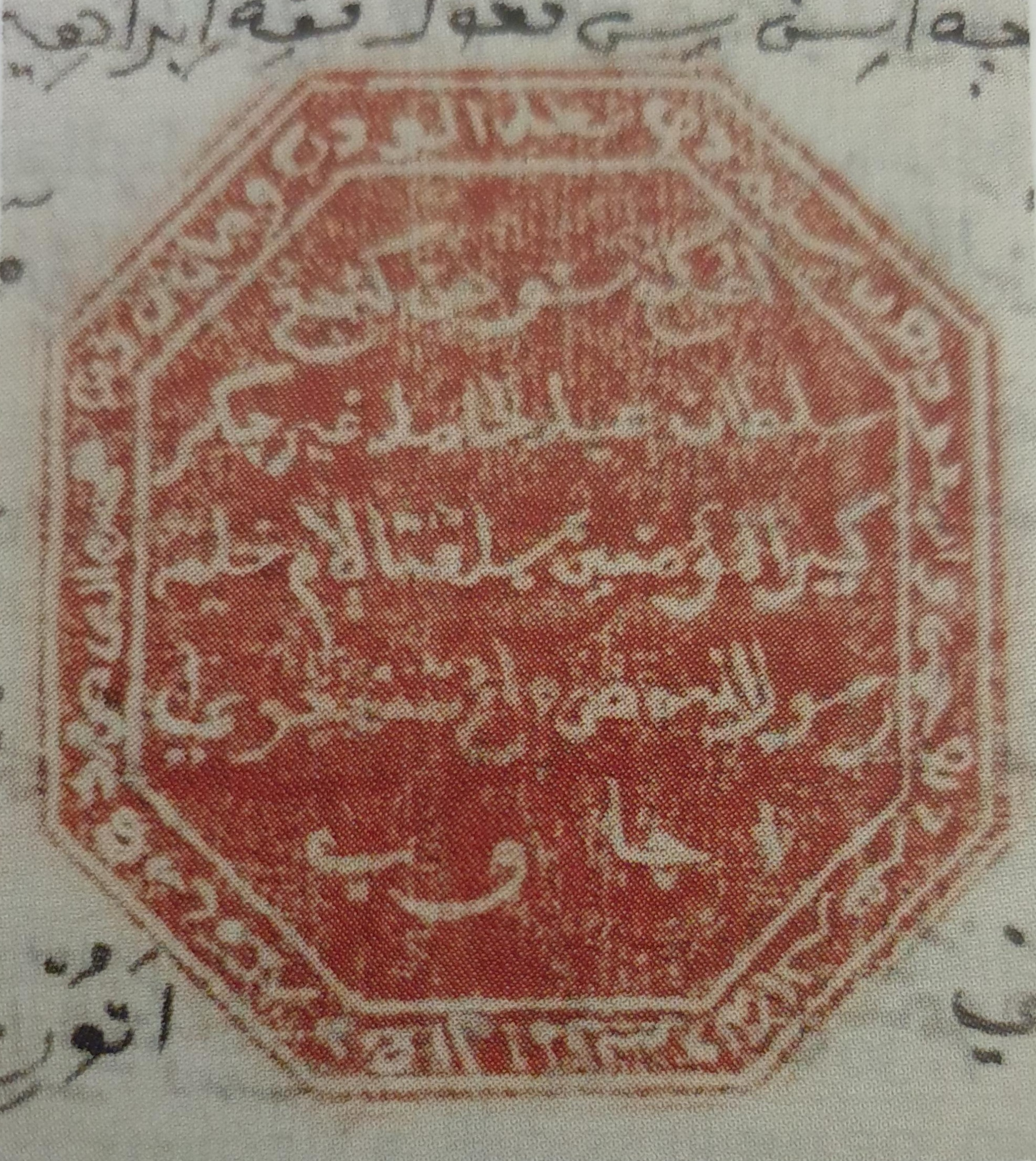
Royal seal of Prince Diponegoro

Diponegoro was born on 11 November 1785 in Yogyakarta, and was the eldest son of Sultan Hamengkubuwono III of Yogyakarta. During his youth at the Yogyakarta court, major occurrences such as the dissolution of the VOC, the British invasion of Java, and the subsequent return to Dutch rule took place. During the invasion, Sultan Hamengkubuwono III pushed aside his power in 1810 in favor of Diponegoro's father and used the general disruption to regain control. In 1812 however, he was once more removed from the throne and exiled off-Java by the British forces. In this process, Diponegoro acted as an adviser to his father and provided aid to the British forces to the point where Stamford Raffles offered him the Sultan title which he declined, perhaps because his father was still reigning.

When the sultan died in 1814, Diponegoro was passed over for the succession to the throne in favor of his younger half-brother, Hamengkubuwono IV (r. 1814–1821), who was supported by the Dutch despite the late Sultan's urging for Diponegoro to be the next Sultan. Being a devout Muslim, Diponegoro was alarmed by the relaxing of religious observance at his half-brother's court in contrast with his own life of seclusion, as well as by the court's pro-Dutch policy.

In 1821, famine and plague spread in Java. Hamengkubuwono IV died in 1822 under mysterious circumstances, leaving only an infant son as his heir. When the year-old boy was appointed as Sultan Hamengkubuwono V, there was a dispute over his guardianship. Diponegoro was again passed over, though he believed he had been promised the right to succeed his half-brother – even though such a succession was illegal under Islamic rules. This series of natural disasters and political upheavals finally erupted into full-scale rebellion.

== Fighting against the Dutch ==
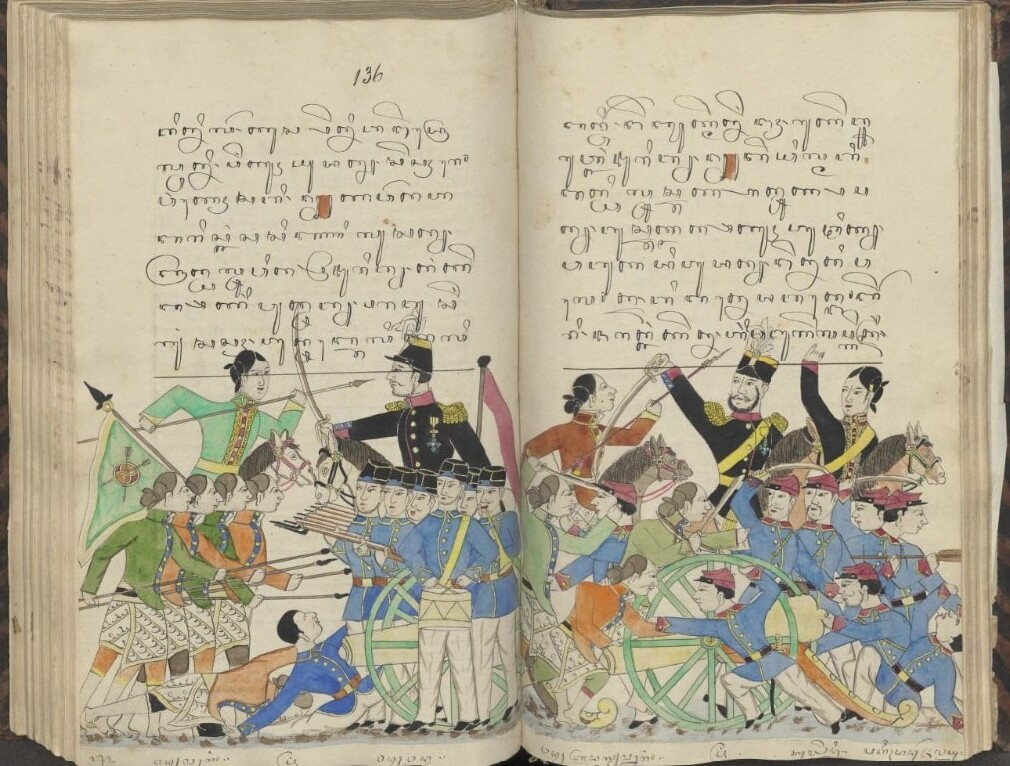
Prince Dipanegara fights with Dutch soldiers. Babad Dipa Nagara, p. 272-273, Indonesia, 1866

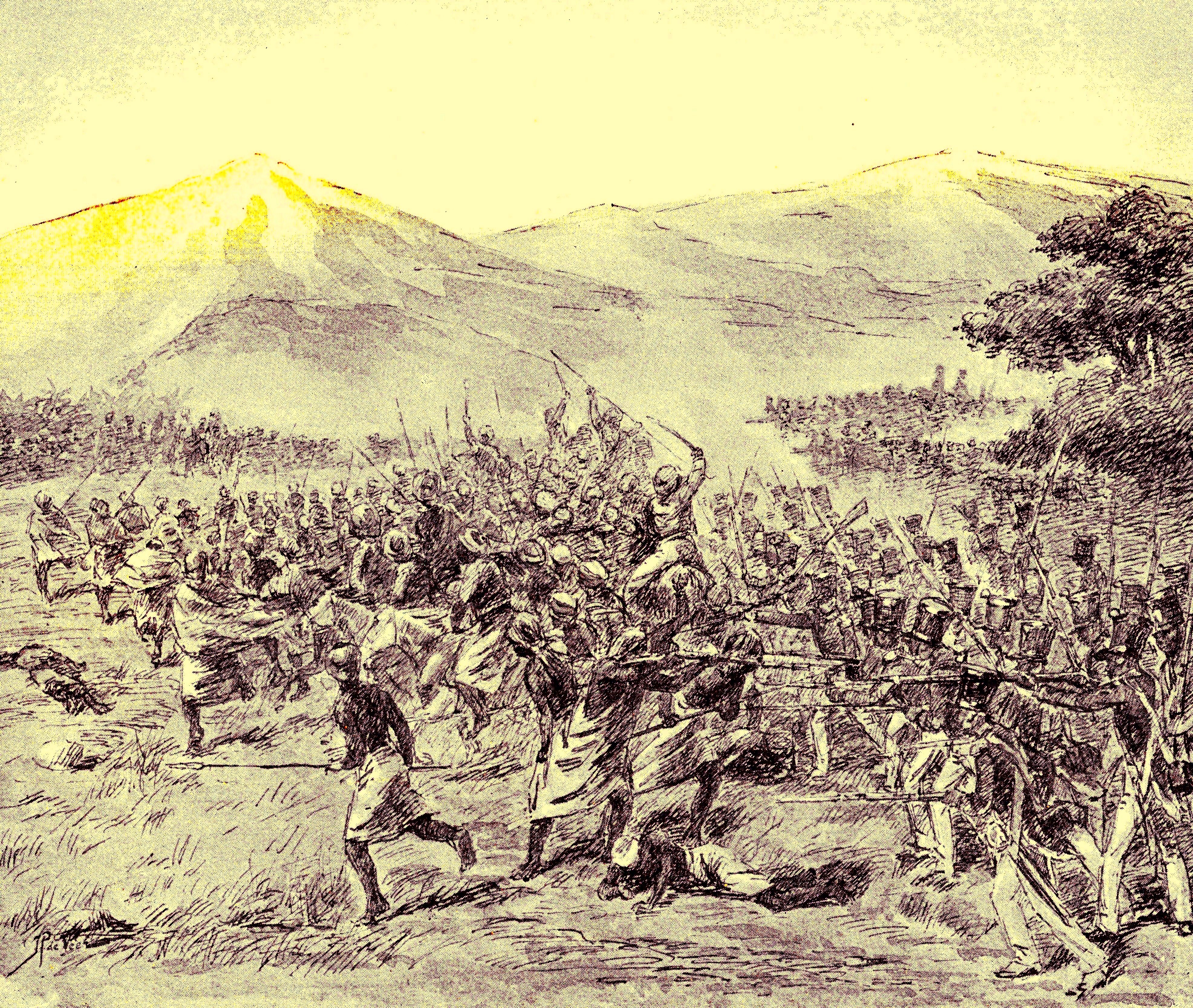
Fighting between Diponegoro's forces and the Dutch colonial forces in Gawok (1900 drawing)

Dutch colonial rule was becoming unpopular among local farmers because of tax rises and crop failures, and among Javanese nobles because the Dutch colonial authorities deprived them of their right to lease land. Diponegoro was widely believed to be the Ratu Adil, the just ruler predicted in the Pralembang Jayabaya. Mount Merapi's eruption in 1822 and a cholera epidemic in 1824 furthered the view that a cataclysm was imminent, eliciting widespread support for Diponegoro.

In the days leading up to the war's outbreak, no action was taken by local Dutch officials although rumors of his upcoming insurrection had been floating about. Prophesies and stories, ranging from visions at the tomb of Banten's former Sultan Ageng Tirtayasa alleged to be the ghost of Sultan Agung (the first Sultan of Mataram, predecessor of the Yogyakarta and Surakarta sultanates) to Diponegoro's contact with Nyai Roro Kidul, spread across the populace.

The beginning of the war saw large losses on the side of the Dutch, due to their lack of coherent strategy and commitment in fighting Diponegoro's guerrilla warfare. Ambushes were set up, and food supplies were denied to the Dutch troops. The Dutch finally committed themselves to control the spreading rebellion by increasing the number of troops and sending General De Kock to stop the insurgency. De Kock developed a strategy of fortified camps (benteng) and mobile forces. Heavily fortified and well-defended soldiers occupied key landmarks to limit the movement of Diponegoro's troops while mobile forces tried to find and fight the rebels. From 1829, Diponegoro definitively lost the initiative and he was put in a defensive position.

The racial aspect of Diponegoro's Java War also made it notorious. Diponegoro's forces targeted the Chinese minority in Java in addition to the Dutch, for example the Chinese residents of Ngawi and Bengawan Solo's riverbanks. Diponegoro's forces mutilated Chinese children, women, and men. The Diponegoro troops despised the Dutch and the Chinese as foreign infidels who had come to pillage Java. The Chinese community's relationship with Javanese was never the same after the Java War.

== Capture and exile ==
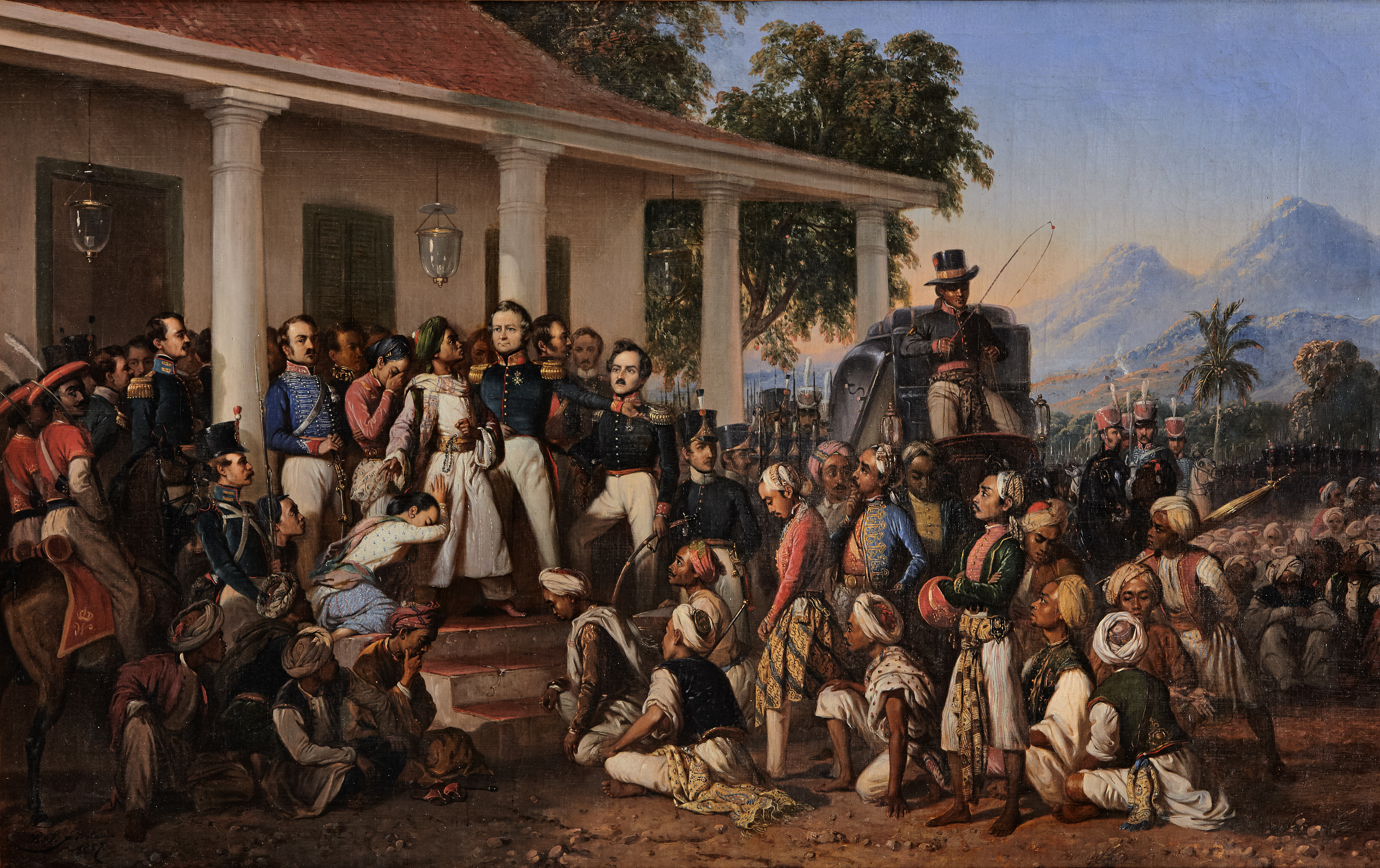
The Arrest of Pangeran Diponegoro by Raden Saleh

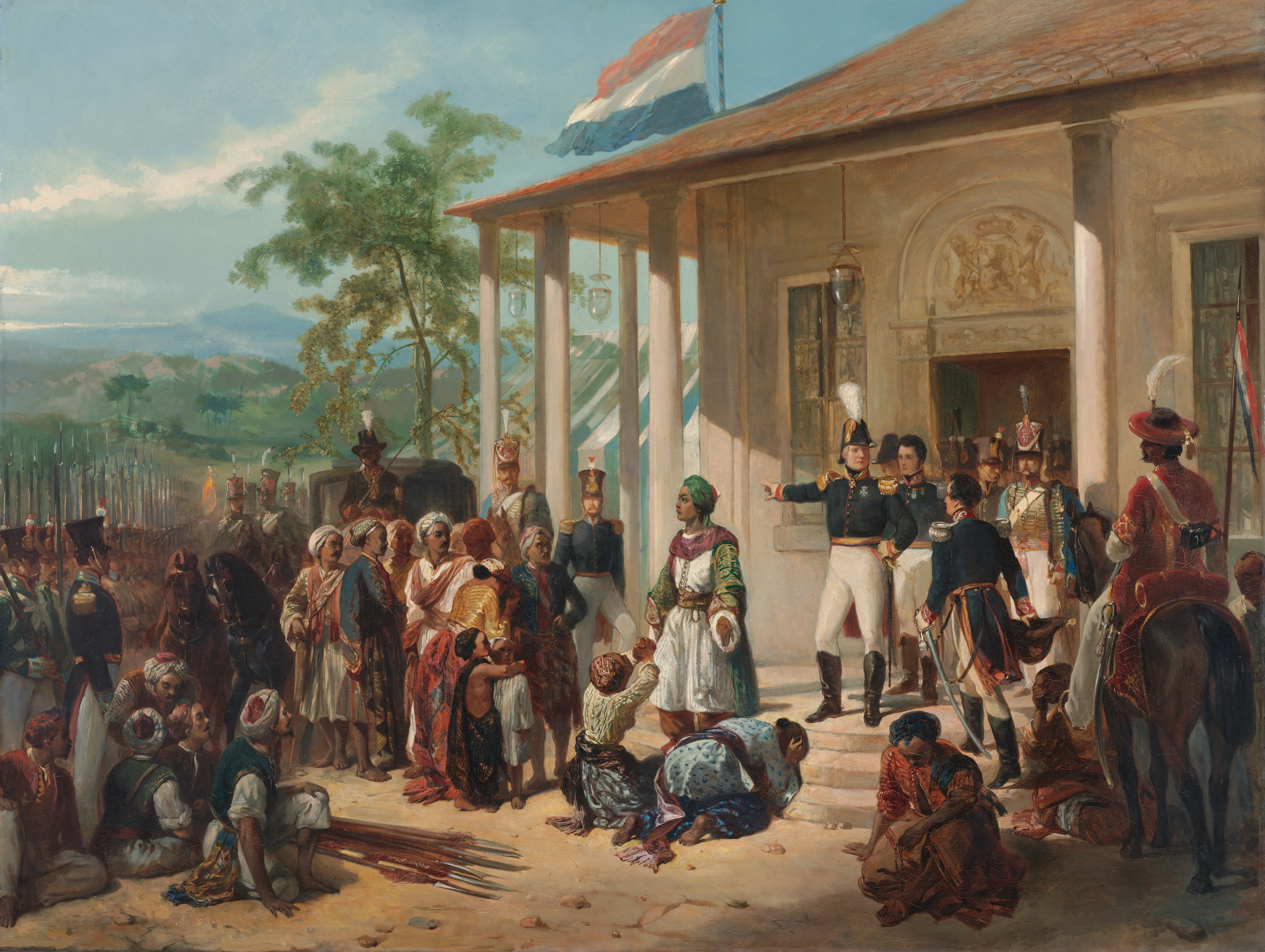
The Submission of Prince Dipo Negoro to General De Kock, by Dutch painter Nicolaas Pieneman

In 1830 Diponegoro's military was as good as beaten and negotiations were started. Diponegoro demanded to have a free state under a sultan and wanted to become the Muslim leader (caliph) for the whole of Java. In March 1830 he was invited to negotiate under a flag of truce. He accepted and met at the town of Magelang but was taken prisoner on 28 March despite the flag of truce. De Kock claimed that he had warned several Javanese nobles to tell Diponegoro he had to lessen his previous demands or that he would be forced to take other measures.

The circumstances of Diponegoro's arrest were seen differently by himself and the Dutch. The former saw the arrest as a betrayal due to the flag of truce, while the latter declared that he had surrendered. The imagery of the event, by Javanese Raden Saleh and Dutch Nicolaas Pieneman, depicted Diponegoro differently – the former visualizing him as a defiant victim, the latter as a subjugated man. Immediately after his arrest, he was taken to Semarang and later to Batavia, where he was detained at the basement of what is today the Jakarta History Museum. In 1830, he was taken to Manado, Sulawesi, by ship.

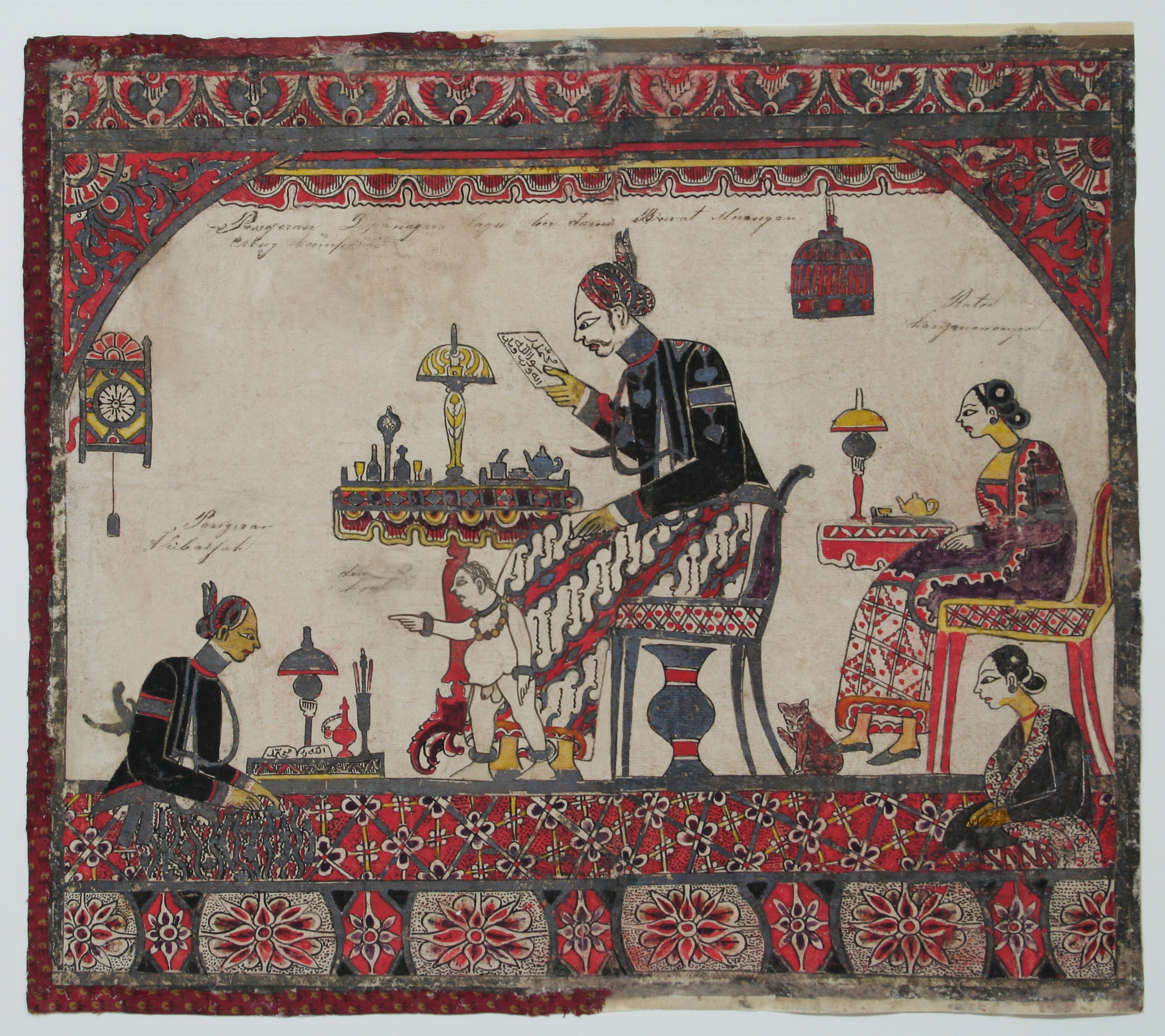
Diponegoro reading the tasawuf text in exile (Collection Leiden University Library)

After several years in Manado, he was moved to Makassar in July 1833 where he was kept in Fort Rotterdam, due to the Dutch believing that the prison was not strong enough to contain him. Despite his prisoner status, his wife Ratnaningsih and some of his followers accompanied him into exile, and he received high-profile visitors, including 16-year-old Dutch Prince Henry in 1837. Diponegoro also composed manuscripts on Javanese history and wrote his autobiography, Babad Diponegoro, during his exile. His physical health deteriorated due to old age, and he died on 8 January 1855, at 69 years old.

Before he died, Diponegoro had mandated that he be buried in Kampung Melayu, a neighborhood then inhabited by the Chinese and the Dutch. This was followed with the Dutch donating 1.5 ha (3 3/4 acres) of land for his graveyard which today has shrunk to just 550 square meters (5,900 square feet). Later, his wife and followers were also buried in the same complex. His tomb is today visited by pilgrims – often military officers and politicians.

== Personal life ==
Diponegoro was married eight times. His first marriage was to Raden Ayu Retna Madungbroto, the daughter of Kyai Gedhe Dadapan from Dadapan village, Tempel sub-district, in 1803. In 1807, Diponegoro married his second wife Raden Ajeng Supadmi or RA Retnakusuma, the daughter of Raden Tumenggung Natawijaya III. A year later, he married his third wife RA Retnodewati in 1808. After the death of his first and third wife, Diponegoro married his fourth wife Raden Ayu Citrowati, the daughter of Raden Tumenggung Ronggo Parwirosentiko, and has had a child during a riot in Madiun. Citrowati died after gave birth and their son was taken by Ki Tembi, Diponegoro's best friend, and given a pseudonym Singlon. In 1814, Diponegoro married his fifth wife RA Maduretno, the daughter of Raden Rangga Prawiradirjo III and Ratu Maduretno. After being crowned as Sultan Abdulhamid, in 1828, he married his sixth wife RA Retnaningrum, the daughter of Pangeran Penengah or Dipawiyana II. Diponegoro's seventh wife was RA Retnaningsih, the daughter of Raden Tumenggung Sumoprawiro. His eighth wife was RA Retnakumala, the daughter of Kyai Guru Kasongan.

== Legacy ==
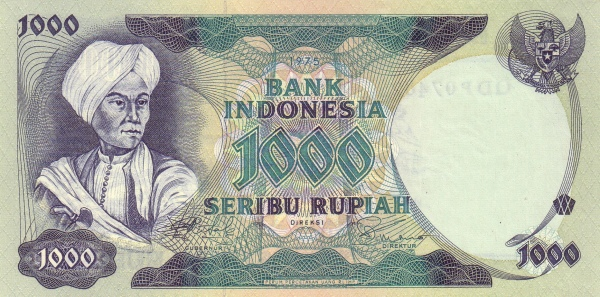
Diponegoro in a 1975 1,000-rupiah banknote

Diponegoro's dynasty would survive to the present day, with their sultans holding secular powers as the governors of the Special Region of Yogyakarta. In 1969, a large monument Sasana Wiratama was erected in Tegalrejo, in Yogyakarta city's perimeter, with sponsorship from the military where Diponegoro's palace was believed to have stood, although at that time there was little to show for such a building. In 1973, under the presidency of Suharto, Diponegoro was made a National Hero of Indonesia.

Kodam IV/Diponegoro, Indonesian Army regional command for the Central Java Military Region, is named after him. The Indonesian Navy has two ships named after him. The first of these was KRI Diponegoro (306), a Skoryy-class destroyer commissioned in 1964 and retired in 1973. The second ship is KRI Diponegoro (365), the lead ship of Diponegoro-class corvette purchased from the Netherlands. Diponegoro University in Semarang was also named after him, along with many major roads in Indonesian cities. Diponegoro is also depicted in Javanese stanzas, wayang, and performing arts, including self-authored Babad Diponegoro.

Poster for the 20th Muhammadiyah Congress, Yogyakarta, 1931

The militancy of people's resistance in Java would rise again during the Indonesian Revolution, which saw the country gain independence from the Netherlands. Early Islamist political parties in Indonesia, such as the Masyumi, portrayed Diponegoro's jihad as a part of the Indonesian national struggle and by extension Islam as a prominent player in the formation of the country.

During a state visit to Indonesia in March 2020, King Willem-Alexander of the Netherlands offered the kris of Prince Diponegoro to Indonesia, received by President Joko Widodo. His kris was long considered lost but was found after being identified by the Dutch National Museum of Ethnology in Leiden. The kris of Prince Diponegoro represents a historic importance, as a symbol of Indonesian heroic resilience and the nation's struggle for independence. The gold-inlaid Javanese dagger previously was held in the Dutch state collection and is now part of the collection of the National Museum of Indonesia. There is doubt whether the Kris is the original Kris of Dipenegoro.

== See also ==
- Babad Diponegoro
