= Battle of Delanggu =

- Part of the Java War
Date	28 August 1826
Location	Delanggu, Klaten
Result	Javanese victory

Belligerents
Dutch East Indies; Surakarta Sunanate	Javanese rebels

Commanders and leaders
Bernard Sollewijn (WIA); Prince Ngabèhi	Diponegoro

Strength
500 Dutch; Surakartan troops	c. 7,000 (Dutch claim)

The Battle of Delanggu took place on 28 August 1826 during the Java War between the forces of Prince Diponegoro and the Dutch garrison at the town of Delanggu. Diponegoro successfully took the town after a brief assault, although Dutch forces managed to retreat in good order.

== Prelude ==
In mid-1826, Diponegoro's forces were in a northwards march after being forced to abandon Yogyakarta and their base in Selarong. Dutch forces attempted to pursue them and capture Diponegoro, but was defeated in the Battle of Kejiwan on 9 August 1826. After his victory, Diponegoro moved further north in order to link up with another rebel army led by Kyai Maja. He also sought to seize the town of Delanggu (in modern Klaten Regency), which would allow him to threaten the city of Surakarta.

== Forces ==
Dutch forces at Delanggu were commanded by Major Bernard Sollewijn, who had been defeated earlier that month in Kejiwan. They consisted of 350 infantrymen and 150 pikemen. Furthermore, the garrison also contained a contingent from the Surakarta Sunanate led by Surakartan Prince Ngabèhi. An additional force of 100 infantrymen and 90 cavalry had to be redeployed from Delanggu due to a lack of forage for the horses.

Diponegoro's forces was assessed by the Dutch to be 8,000-strong prior to the battle. However, around 1,000 had been detached to occupy another area, and did not take part in the battle. They possessed 12 cannons.

== Battle ==
Diponegoro divided his forces into multiple groups in order to assault Delanggu from three directions. The assault began at noon, after Dhuhr prayers, and managed to surprise Delanggu's defenders. The garrison commander, Sollewijn, was shot in one eye early in the fighting and command passed to Dutch artillery captain Van Geen. Surakartan troops fled the town early in the assault, and the remaining Dutch garrison soon found themselves running out of ammunition. Van Geen ordered a successful breakout attempt, and Dutch losses were relatively low with 2 dead and 20 wounded.

According to Diponegoro, a contingent of Madurese troops in the garrison was caught in the retreat and his forces inflicted heavy casualties on the group. His forces also managed to capture some Dutch logistical and money trains.

== Aftermath ==
After the battle, Diponegoro managed to link up with Kyai Maja's army. Kyai Maja pressured Diponegoro to follow up his success with an attack on Klaten, but Diponegoro hesitated due to the stiff resistance he faced at Delanggu. This caused a significant delay, which allowed Dutch commanders to concentrate their forces, which in October 1826 would decisively defeat Diponegoro at Gawok.
