= Storming of Pleret =

Event during the Java War

Siege and storming of Pleret
- Part of the Java War
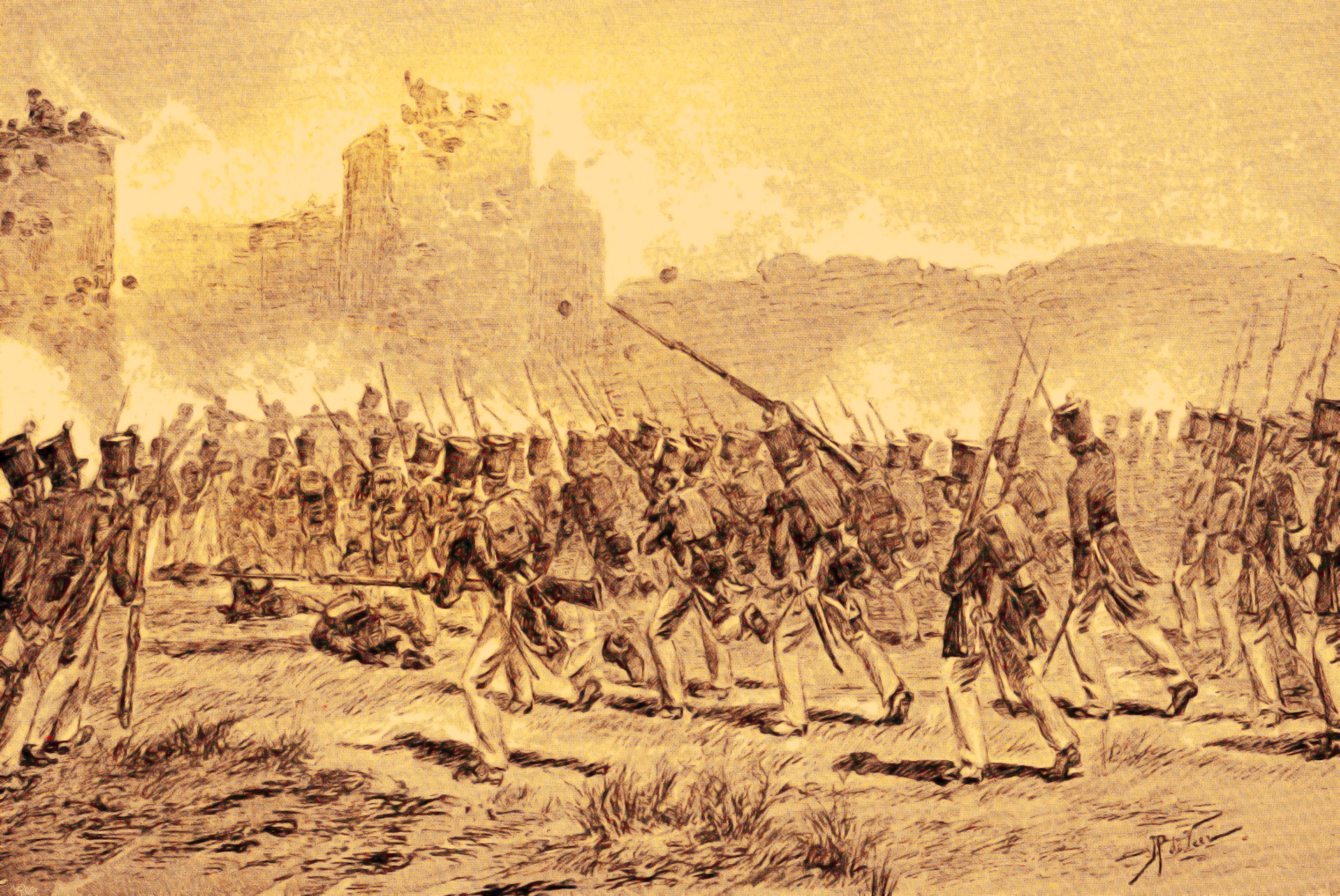
- Bestorming van Pleret (1900) by G. Kepper, depicting the Dutch assault on Pleret in 1826
Date	June 1826
Location	Pleret
Result	Dutch victory

Belligerents
Netherlands	Javanese rebels

Commanders and leaders
Josephus Jacobus; François de Stuers	Diponegoro

Casualties and losses
	700 killed

The siege and storming of Pleret was a siege and storming that occurred in Pleret during the Java War. It was the first time that Diponegoro didn't avoid a pitched battle and it resulted in Dutch victory.

== Background and battle ==
Pleret was abandoned as a capital but still played another role during the Java War (1825–1830) between the Dutch and the Javanese forces under Prince Diponegoro. Pleret was occupied by Diponegoro in 1825. He kept his weapons and livestock there. Diponegoro used it as a base to attack convoys supplying the nearby Imogiri held by the Dutch. In April 1826, the Dutch attacked Pleret under General Josephus Jacobus van Geen. Diponegoro did not engage in combat and withdrew to the west. Van Geen entered Pleret and took the weapons and livestock kept there as booty. Lacking forces to keep the town, he withdrew to Yogyakarta. Thereafter Diponegoro reocuppied the town and fortified it. Diponegoro gave particular importance to this city. In June 1826, Dutch forces with a strong contingent of Madurese auxiliaries besieged the town. On 9 June, the besiegers detonated a mine under the ramparts, causing a breach through which they attacked. After a day of "bloody fighting", the attackers completely occupied Pleret. This battle was Diponegoro's first major defeat in the war. The Dutch left a garrison of 700 men, and there was no further attempt from Diponegoro to retake Pleret.

== See also ==
- Java War

== Bibliography ==
- Dumarçay, Jacques (1989). "Plered, capitale d'Amangkurat I^{er}". Archipel (in French). 37 (1). PERSEE: 189–198. doi:10.3406/arch.1989.2570.
