= Battle of Siluk =

1829 battle in the Java War

- Part of the Java War
Date	17 September 1829
Location	Siluk, Yogyakarta Sultanate
Result	Dutch victory

Belligerents
Dutch East Indies	Javanese rebels

Commanders and leaders
Col. Cochius; Bernard Sollewijn; Lt. Col. Le Bron de Vexela	Diponegoro; Sentot Prawirodirdjo; Prabuningrat †

Strength
c. 1,500	c. 300

Casualties and losses
	54 killed

The Battle of Siluk was an engagement at the closing stages of the Java War between rebel forces of Prince Diponegoro, commanded by Sentot Prawirodirdjo, and Dutch colonial forces on 17 September 1829. Dutch forces, pursuing Diponegoro, attempted to surround his force at the village of Siluk, and after a battle, scattered the remnants of the rebel force while failing to capture Diponegoro.

== Prelude ==
In June 1829, the Dutch colonial army launched an offensive to defeat the last rebel forces under Diponegoro within the Yogyakarta Sultanate. Diponegoro's forces was defeated in a series of engagements during the offensive, reducing their remaining numbers from 700 in June to around 300. Several villages used as their bases were also captured. By September, the remaining rebels were forced to the vicinity of the Selarong hills in modern Bantul.

== Battle ==
On 16 September, the Dutch pursuing force under Colonel Cochius learned of Diponegoro's arrival at the village of Siluk (or Selo). The Dutch force consisted of three mobile columns: one under Cochius, and two more under Lieutenant Colonels Le Bron de Vexela and Bernard Sollewijn. On average, a Dutch column comprised roughly 500 soldiers. They quickly pursued, and managed to arrive at the village unnoticed the following day. Dutch troops took up positions to surround the village and cut off the rebels' escape. One of the Dutch units east of Siluk was discovered, and fighting ensued.

The rebels, mostly cavalrymen, began to retreat in close order, with 50 cavalrymen under the command of Diponegoro's uncle Prince Prabuningrat covering their retreat. In the battle, 20 of the defending cavalrymen were killed, including Prabuningrat. His body was later identified by his diamond-decorated kris. Diponegoro managed to flee west across the Progo River, but was separated from his commander, Sentot Prawirodirdjo, who escaped southwards. Diponegoro's knowledge of the Progo River enabled his escape, as Dutch cavalrymen pursuing him had their horses swept away by the river's currents. Fifty-four rebels were killed, including seven leading nobles according to Diponegoro's account.

== Aftermath ==
Shortly after the battle, a bounty of 20 thousand guilders was placed on Diponegoro. A number of rebel commanders operating in the north of the Yogyakarta Sultanate surrendered to the Dutch upon news of the battle, with Sentot surrendering in October. Another key rebel commander, Jayakusuma I, was killed on 21 September in an ambush. After Siluk and the ensuing losses of his commanders throughout September and October, Diponegoro was "virtually alone", and would eventually agree to negotiations with the Dutch in person, leading to his capture in March 1830 ending the war. Indonesian military historian Saleh Djamhari wrote that the defeat at Siluk virtually ended any military threat remaining from the rebels.
