= Battle of Gawok =

1826 battle

- Part of the Java War
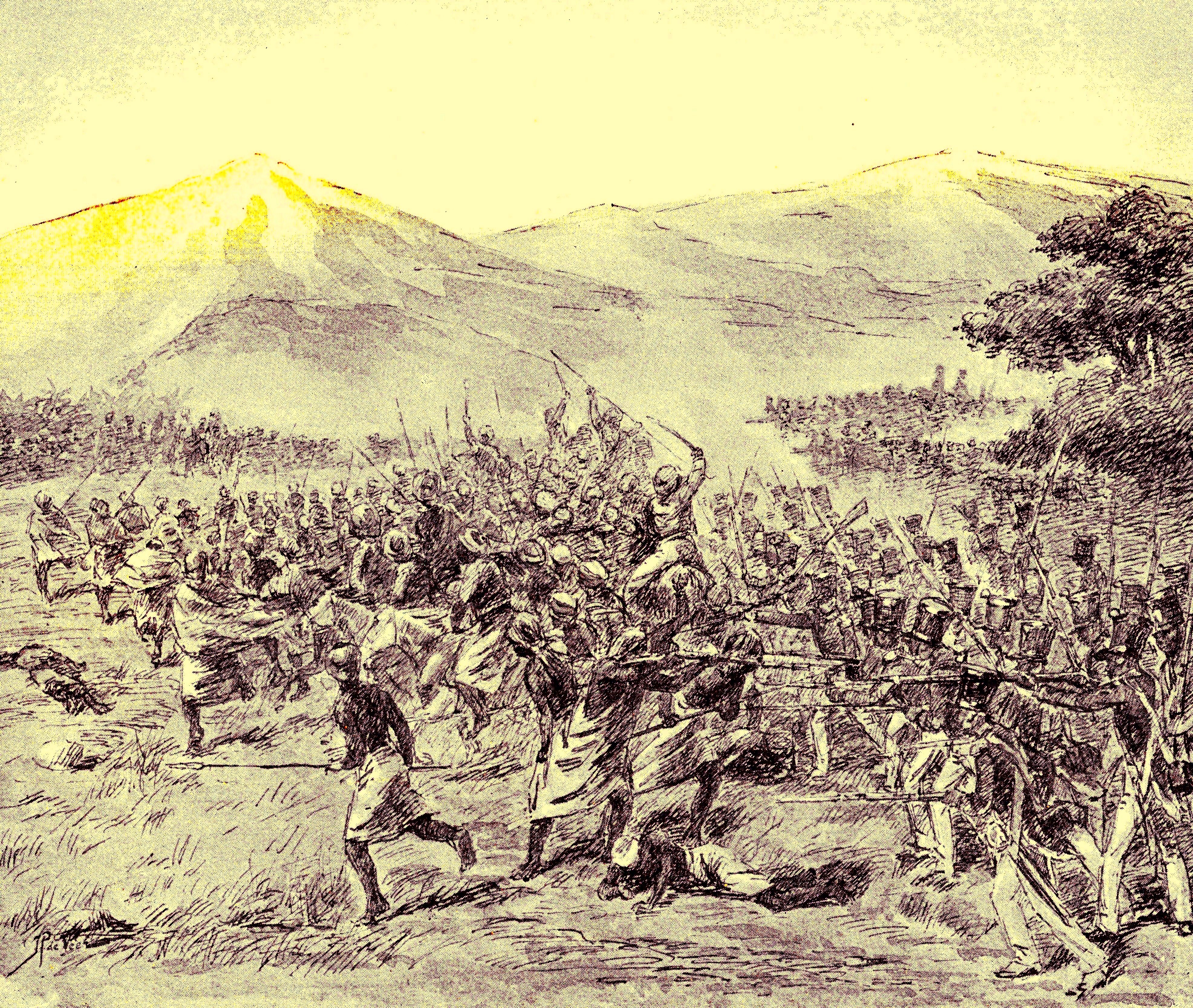
- Dutch drawing of the battle, c. 1900
Date	15 October 1826
Location	Gawok, Surakarta Sunanate 7°36′11″S 110°45′06″E
Result	Dutch victory

Belligerents
Dutch East Indies; Surakarta Sunanate	Javanese rebels

Commanders and leaders
J. J. van Geen; Frans David Cochius; J. Le Bron de Vexela	Sentot Prawirodirdjo; Diponegoro (WIA); Kyai Maja

Strength
c. 1,500	c. 4,000

Casualties and losses
Light	Heavy

The Battle of Gawok took place on 15 October 1826 during the Java War between rebels under Prince Diponegoro and the Dutch colonial army. The battle took place near the village of Gawok, west of the city of Surakarta. Diponegoro's army, which had previously defeated Dutch columns on its march from Yogyakarta, intended to attack the Dutch military headquarters at Surakarta. The rebels were soundly defeated, which lost them their numerical superiority and therefore turned the tide of the war. After the battle, the rebels shifted to a guerrilla warfare strategy.

== Prelude ==
Prince Diponegoro's forces enjoyed a string of successes during mid-1826 in a series of battles north of Yogyakarta. The rebels intended to launch an assault on the city of Surakarta, headquarters of the Dutch forces under General Hendrik Merkus de Kock. By late August, Diponegoro had captured the town of Delanggu and linked up with another rebel army under Kyai Maja. Afterwards, Kyai Maja advocated for further offensive operations while Diponegoro hesitated due to stiff Dutch resistance at Delanggu. Due to this, little military action occurred in the vicinity of Surakarta for three weeks after Delanggu.

During this lull, Dutch command ordered some troops which had been dispersed in Yogyakarta and Surakarta to assemble at Surakarta. Further reinforcements also began to arrive from the Netherlands. Action resumed in late September, with skirmishes occurring for the next two weeks as the rebel army approached Surakarta. Around 12 October, Diponegoro had encamped at the village of Gawok, some 8 miles (13 km) west-southwest of Surakarta.

== Forces ==
By late September, two Dutch columns recalled from Yogyakarta had assembled near Gawok, with a total strength of around 1,000 men. This was further reinforced by 300 men from the Sunanate and another 150 men from Dutch commander General van Geen, plus additional troops from local Javanese leaders aligned with the Dutch.

Dutch reports indicated Diponegoro's army at Gawok numbered around 4,000. One Dutch account suggested Diponegoro's army numbered 25 to 30 thousand, but this was likely exaggerated.

== Battle ==
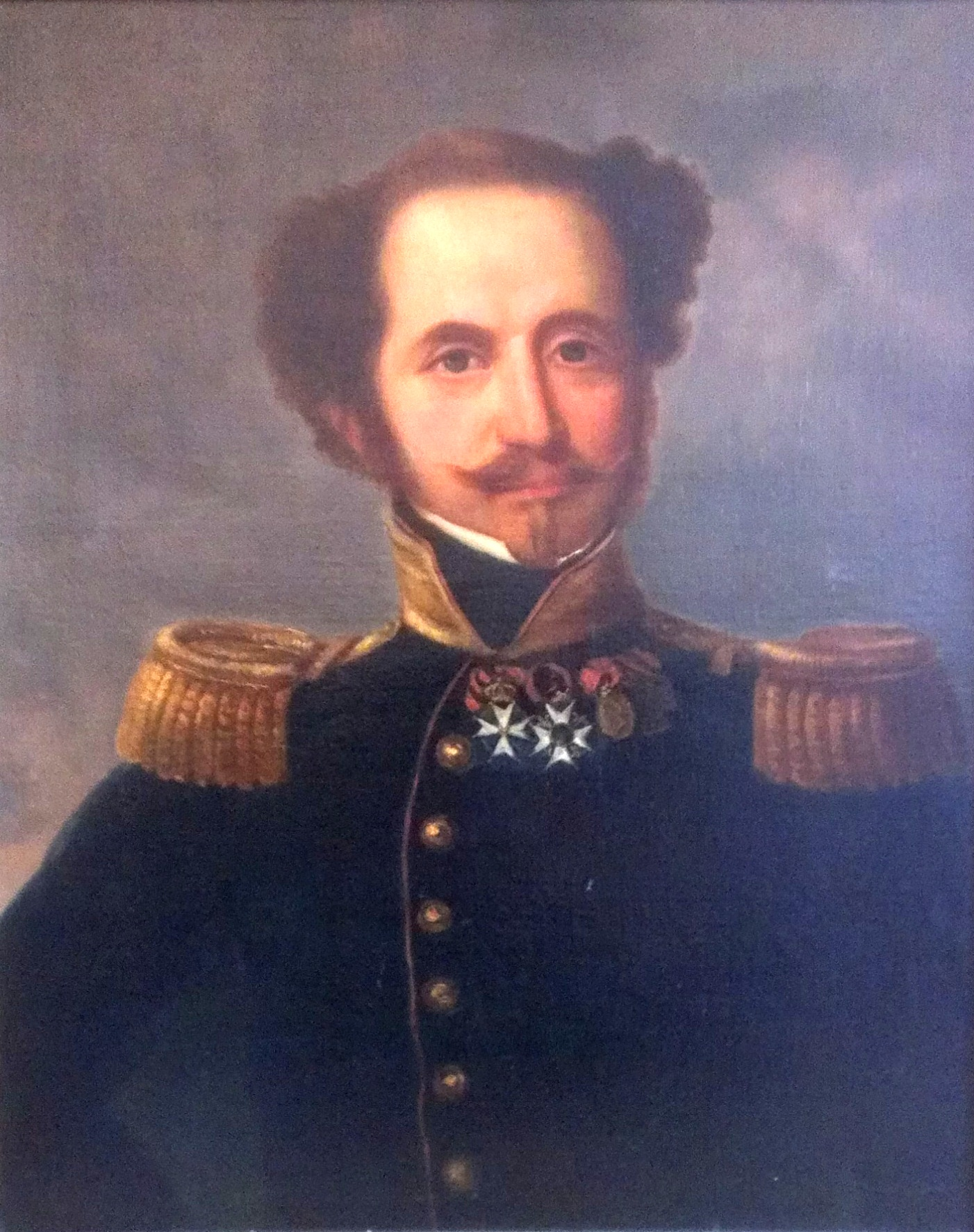
Major Le Bron, one of the Dutch commanders

Fighting began at around 4 am on 15 October, as one of the two Dutch columns under colonel Frans David Cochius encountered Diponegoro's forces at the hamlet of Baki, near Gawok. The other Dutch column under major Le Bron de Vexela, receiving a signal for reinforcements, quickly marched towards the fighting, reaching the battlefield at around 7:30 am. Le Bron ordered a charge by a company of Ambonese troops, which successfully pushed back Diponegoro's men, before following up with a general attack. A counter-charge by the rebels was repelled by Mangkunegaran troops, and the rebels were soon routed.

Diponegoro himself was shot at least twice during the battle: above his chest (bounced) and on his right hand (fragmented). Neither shot left permanent scars. Diponegoro was also hit by cannonball shrapnel and fell from his horse in the battle. Dutch claims stated that when the Dutch columns left the battlefield, they "left only a single Javanese in the battlefield", while Diponegoro's losses were heavy.

== Aftermath ==
The defeat had been disastrous for the rebel war effort, as the core of the rebel army was lost in the battle. Diponegoro's aristocratic and santri supporters blamed each other for the defeat, with Kyai Maja in particular being blamed for having advocated attacking. Having lost their numerical superiority, rebel forces transitioned from the offensive into guerilla warfare. Diponegoro himself had to retreat on a stretcher, and rarely became involved in person in military engagements after the battle. In his Babad Dipanegara written after the war, Diponegoro partly blamed his defeat on his own infidelity, as he had a sexual encounter with a female Chinese prisoner shortly prior to the battle.
