= Djamhari =

Djamhari is a surname. Notable people with the surname include:

- Mochammad Djamhari (1943–2026), Indonesian military officer
- Saleh Djamhari (1938–2017), Indonesian military historian and army officer
