= Ambush at Mount Kelir =

- Part of the Java War
Date	21 September 1829
Location	Mount Kelir, Yogyakarta Sultanate
Result	Dutch victory

Belligerents
Dutch East Indies; Yogyakarta Sultanate	Javanese rebels

Commanders and leaders
Cokronegoro I	Jayakusuma I †

Strength
Unknown, larger	~20

Casualties and losses
Light	Total

The ambush at Mount Kelir took part on 21 September 1829 during the closing stages of the Java War, at the foot of Mount Kelir in Kulon Progo. High-ranking rebel commander Jayakusuma I was killed during the encounter.

Prince Jayakusuma I, one of the senior commanders of Javanese rebels under Diponegoro, along with two of his sons and twenty cavalrymen, was ambushed by a larger force of native troops fighting under the Dutch, consisting of Javanese and Manadonese soldiers led by Javanese officer Raden Ngabehi Resodiwiryo (later known as Cokronegoro I). According to Dutch colonel J. B. Cleerens, Jayakusuma proclaimed his status as a member of the royal family. However, he refused to hand over his keris when demanded, leading the native troops to attack and kill them. Shortly prior to the ambush, Diponegoro had lost more commanders in his defeat in Siluk, and more commanders would surrender to the Dutch in October.

The bodies of Jayakusuma and his two sons were beheaded, and their heads were buried at the Banyusumurup cemetery traditionally reserved for enemies of the Yogyakarta Sultanate. Their bodies were thrown into a nearby small stream, and was later given an Islamic burial at the village of Sengir. The locals of Sengir village maintain the graves of Jayakusuma and his sons to this day. A local ceremony commemorating Jayakusuma is held annually at Sengir.
