= Sasradilaga rebellion =

Java War military campaign

- Part of the Java War
Date	28 November 1827 – 7 March 1828
Location	Rembang and Rajekwesi, Dutch East Indies
Result	Dutch victory

Belligerents
Dutch East Indies	Javanese rebels

Commanders and leaders
H. M. de Kock	R. Aria Sasradilaga (WIA)

Strength
c. 2,700	c. 1,000

The Sasradilaga rebellion was a military campaign of the Java War conducted by Yogyakarta noble Raden Aria Sasradilaga against Dutch forces. Sasradilaga, who had previously fought alongside Dutch forces, turned to join his brother-in-law Prince Diponegoro in revolt, attacking the Dutch in the Rembang region starting in November 1827. The Dutch were caught off-guard, before managing to gather forces for a counterattack which pushed Sasradilaga into a guerilla war. Sasradilaga was defeated in February 1828 after he lost his base at Rajekwesi, and his rebellion was considered over by March.

== Background ==
In August 1826, Raden Tumenggung Aria Sasradilaga, a captain of the bodyguards of the Yogyakarta Sultanate, turned over to the rebel side under his brother-in-law Diponegoro with several followers. According to the Babad Dipanegara, Sasradilaga had poor relations with the newly installed old sultan Hamengkubuwana II. Sasradilaga had previously fought against Diponegoro's forces in the siege of Yogyakarta. After military setbacks in mid-1827, Diponegoro sent Sasradilaga to his birthplace of Rajekwesi (today Bojonegoro) in Rembang Residency to open a new front against the Dutch. Rajekwesi was part of Yogyakarta until 1811, when it was annexed by the colonial government under H. W. Daendels. Sasradilaga is a son of the former bupati there, and Diponegoro appointed him rebel bupati of Rembang.

== Rebellion ==
=== Outbreak ===
On 28 November 1827, Sasradilaga launched an attack on the home of Rajekwesi's patih and other officials. The Dutch discovered Sasradilaga's involvement in the rebellion several days after, from letters he sent to other patih threatening them to join him. The uprising caught the Dutch by surprise, and as they had committed most of their available forces to fighting Diponegoro in the Yogyakarta and Surakarta areas, little reserves were available to defeat Sasradilaga. As a result, Sasradilaga's forces numbering around 1,000 managed to seize a large number of villages and towns within Rembang Residency. Dutch command could initially only spare 100 soldiers to reinforce Rembang, which was pulled from Batavia. Another attempt of reinforcement from Surakarta with 130 soldiers was ambushed by the rebels and routed on 9 December.

Unlike inland areas, where Javanese rebels engaged in violence against Chinese communities, Sasradilaga's forces enjoyed better relations. The Chinese communities of Rembang supplied weapons and fought as part of Sasradilaga's army. However, many were forced to convert to Islam under threat of death. By December, Sasradilaga's men had seized control of the southern half of the residency, cutting off the line of communication between Semarang and Surabaya.

=== Dutch response ===
Another Dutch column of 200 soldiers was dispatched from Semarang, beating back Sasradilaga from the northern half of the residency and recapturing several roads. The situation improved by the Dutch, and the Semarang–Surabaya road was considered secure by January 1828. Several Dutch columns were redeployed to defeat Sasradilaga, and Sasradilaga's headquarters at Rajekwesi was taken by three Dutch columns on 27 January 1828, with hundreds of Sasradilaga's men killed in the fighting. Sasradilaga evaded capture and began engaging in guerilla war in Madiun to the south.

Sasradilaga's continued guerilla war resulted in the Dutch deployment of around 2,500 infantrymen and 200 cavalrymen in the region. Several field fortifications were also constructed in Rembang following the Dutch Bentengsteelsel strategy. His remaining force of around 300 men was defeated in an engagement by the bupati of Rajekwesi in February 1828. The Dutch considered the uprising to be over on 7 March 1828, when a wounded Sasradilaga attempting to form another army was forced to flee the area after being discovered.

== Aftermath ==
Sasradilaga fled south back to Diponegoro's area of operations in Yogyakarta, before surrendering to the Dutch on 3 October 1828. The town of Rajekwesi was devastated in the fighting, and colonial authorities decided to rebuild the town at a more defensible location under a new name. On 25 September 1828, Governor-General Leonard du Bus de Gisignies approved the renaming of Rajekwesi to Bojonegoro. Local colonial authorities planned reprisals against Chinese families which collaborated with Sasradilaga, but ultimately the reprisals were not executed. The Sosrodilogo Bridge in Bojonegoro, named after Sasradilaga, was opened in 2019.
