= Attack on Selarong =

Attacks on Selarong (1825)
- Part of Java War
| Date | 25 July – 4 November 1825 |
| Location | Selarong Cave |
| Result | Javanese victory |

Belligerents
| Netherlands | Javanese rebel |

Commanders and leaders
| (Netherlands) Captain Bouwes (Netherlands) Major Sellwinj (Netherlands) Lt.Col Aachenbac | Diponegoro |

Strength
| Thousands | Hundreds |

Casualties and losses
| 215 surrendered Hundreds were killed | Few troops were killed |

The Attack on Selarong was a series of Dutch military expeditions in 1825 to storm Javanese Prince Diponegoro's primary base at Selarong Cave, at the start of the Java War. The expedition was divided into three phases. All of the expeditions resulted in Dutch failure and were ineffective in relieving pressure on Dutch forces during the siege of Yogyakarta.

== Background ==
After Diponegoro's main base at Tegalreja was burned, he established a new base at Selarong Cave. Diponegoro always used this base to plan strategies against the Dutch, and produce weapons including mortars. After the Dutch learned the location of the cave, they prepared an expedition to attack it.

== Expedition ==
The first expeditions were led by Captain Bouwes on 25 July 1825. When Bouwes's forces entered the cave, they did not find Diponegoro and his family. Upon their retreat, Diponegoro and Javanese forces deployed guerrilla attacks on the Bouwes forces. Bouwes responded with mortars and rifles, but after 215 Dutch soldiers surrendered, Bouwes and his remaining troops retreated.

The second and third expeditions were led by Major Sellwinj and Lieutenant Colonel Achenbac. By October 1825. The expedition failed when Dutch infantry attacked Diponegoro and his family, who managed to escape. Subsequently, Javanese forces launched attacks on the rear flanks of the Dutch, causing heavy casualties.

== Aftermath ==
The expedition ended in failure for the Dutch, and Diponegoro relocated to his primary base on Dekso. The British historian Peter Carey said the failure of this expedition "proved ineffective in easing pressure on Yogyakarta which remained under siege" until 20 September 1825, and cites the Javanese guerrilla tactics and their home territory advantage as decisive.
