= Kyai Maja =

Indonesian cleric, rebel and war commander (c. 1792 – 1849)

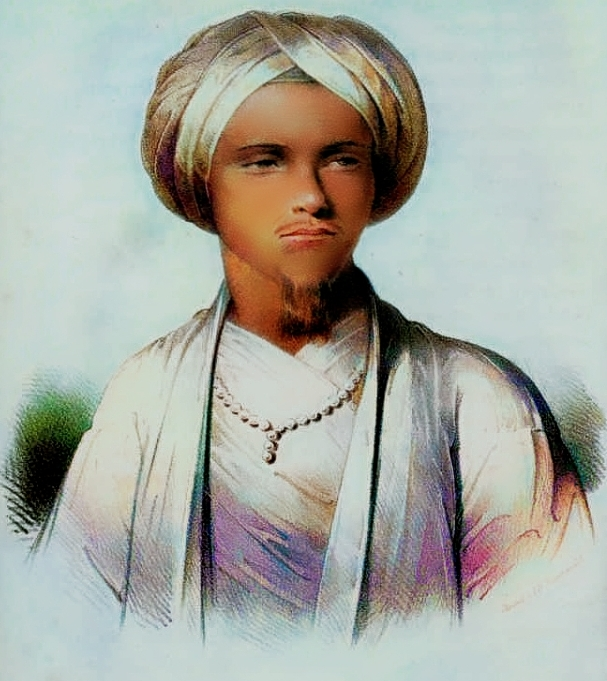
- Dutch drawing, published 1847
- Born: c. 1792; Mojo, Surakarta Sunanate
- Died: 20 December 1849 (aged 56–57); Tondano, Dutch East Indies

Muslim Mochammad Khalifah (c. 1792 – 20 December 1849), better known as Kyai Maja or Kyai Modjo, was a Javanese ulama and spiritual leader best known for his role as a key commander and religious adviser of Diponegoro during the Java War. He was a key commander of the rebels until his surrender in late 1828, and he was later exiled to Tondano where he died in 1849.

== Early life ==
Kyai Maja was born as Muslim Mochammad Khalifah around 1792 at the village of Mojo, within the Surakarta Sunanate. His father was Iman Abdul Ngarip, a notable ulama in Java better known to contemporaries as Kyai Baderan. Maja's mother R. A. Mursilah was of Yogyakartan nobility, being the sister of Sultan Hamengkubuwono III. Ngarip was also of noble birth at the Surakarta Sunanate, but became an Islamic preacher.

== Java War ==
Sometime in the late 1810s, Prince Diponegoro's eldest son Diponegoro II became a pupil of Maja's. Under these circumstances, Diponegoro (Maja's cousin) met Maja at the latter's religious establishment in Mojo. Maja would in turn visit Diponegoro at his feudal estate of Tegalreja. In August 1825, following the outbreak of the Java War, Diponegoro summoned Maja to his base at Selarong Cave. Diponegoro retained Maja as a religious adviser, especially on matters of the Quran. Among other santri who sided with Diponegoro, Maja gained a leading role due to his strong knowledge of the Quran and his strong character. This was despite many of Diponegoro's supporters being hajji, while Maja had never gone on hajj.

After the rebels' failed siege of Yogyakarta, Maja led a rebel force which quickly seized much of the Pajang area. Diponegoro would move north from Yogyakarta to Surakarta in 1826, linking up with Maja's army. A dispute emerged between the two, with Maja advocating for an aggressive approach to secure more of Surakarta's territories while Diponegoro took a more cautious approach. This caused a delay, which allowed Dutch forces to reorganize and defeat the rebel force in the Battle of Gawok in October 1826. Maja took much of the blame from the defeat. Due to his Surakartan origins, Maja was already seen with suspicion by Diponegoro's Yogyakartan aristocratic supporters.

By 1827, Maja had fallen out with Diponegoro. He had engaged with negotiations with the Dutch since August 1827 – initially with Diponegoro's backing, but later on his own accord. After another dispute with Diponegoro in November 1828, Maja left Diponegoro's base with a group of 500 soldiers, intending to negotiate further with the Dutch. However, the Dutch commanders were ordered to attempt to capture Maja, and on 10 November 1828 Maja was encircled by Dutch soldiers at the slopes of Mount Merapi. Under these circumstances, he accepted a Dutch ultimatum for unconditional surrender. The Dutch initially hoped that Maja would facilitate negotiations with other rebel leaders, but as he refused to do so, he was exiled with 62 followers.

== Exile and death ==
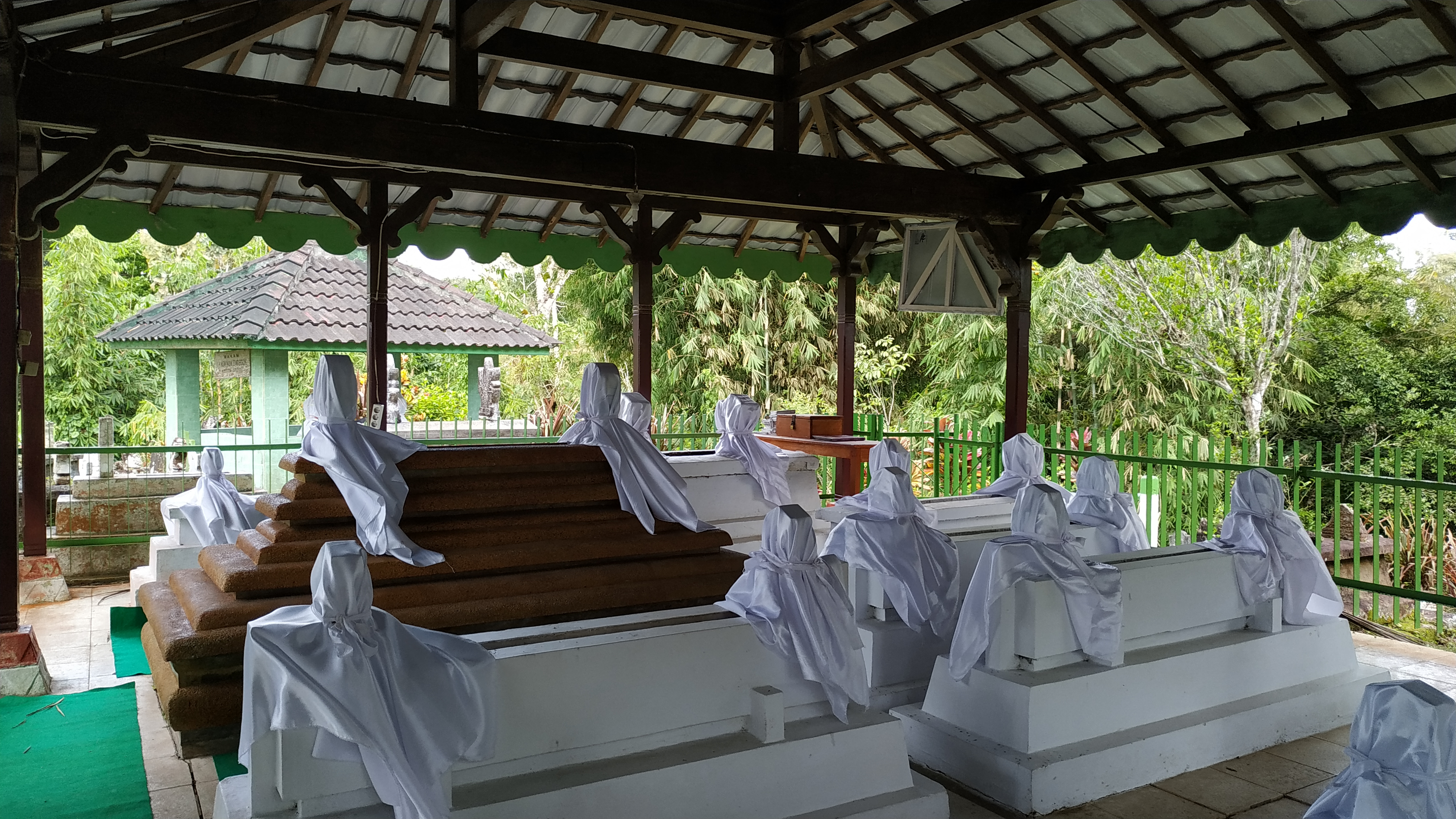
Kyai Maja's grave in Tondano.

After stopovers in Makassar and Ambon, Maja and his followers arrived at Manado on 1 May 1830 and then moved further inland to Tondano. During his exile, he befriended Christian missionary Johann Friedrich Riedel who was proselytizing in Minahasan lands, the two exchanging gifts. He died at the shores of Lake Tondano on 20 December 1849, and was buried there. His followers continued to live at Tondano and their descendants settled in a village today known as Kampung Jawa (Javanese village).

Kyai Maja's grave has become a site for spiritual pilgrimages. Later president Prabowo Subianto proposed in 2018 that Maja's grave be relocated back to his homeland in Surakarta. In modern Surakarta, a neighborhood is named after Maja, along with a major road within the neighborhood.

== Family ==
Maja was initially married to Nyai Maja, but she died in childbirth in early 1828. Maja then remarried Raden Ayu Mangkubumi, the former divorced wife of Prince Mangkubumi, another of Diponegoro's commanders. Initially remaining in Java, Raden Ayu later followed Maja to Tondano in his exile. Maja's descendants, who settled with him in exile at Tondano, followed the Minahasan practice of clan names, and adopted Kiay Modjo as their clan name.
