= Skirmish at Tegalreja =

- Part of the Java War
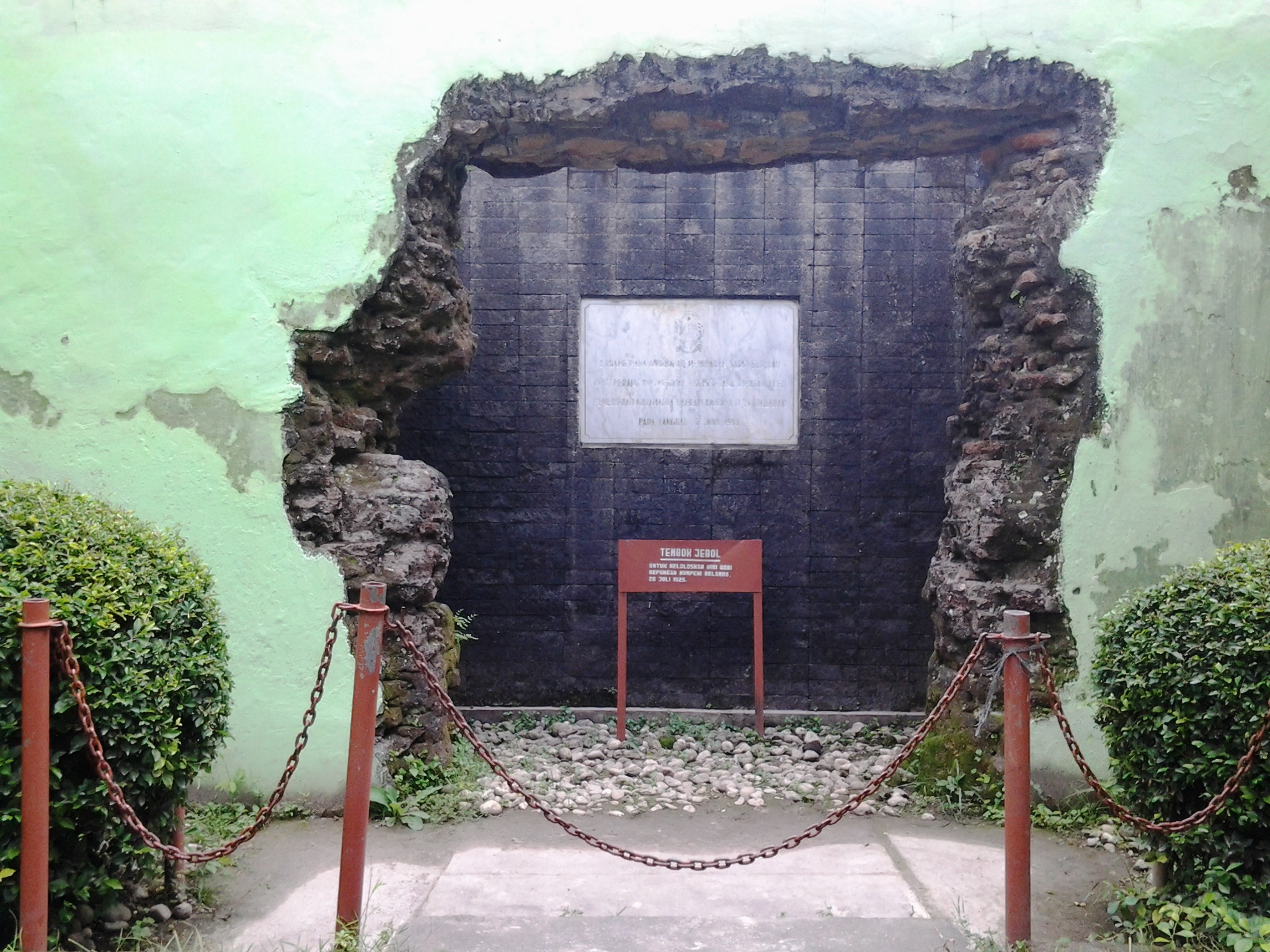
- A memorial plaque at the busted wall of Diponegoro's estate, a site where he escaped the raid
Date	20 July 1825
Location	Tegalreja, Yogyakarta Sultanate
Result	Diponegoro escaped, Java War started

Belligerents
Dutch East Indies; Yogyakarta Sultanate	Javanese rebels Local villagers

Commanders and leaders
P. F. H. Chevallier	Diponegoro

Strength
50 Dutch soldiers Yogyakartan troops	c. 1,500

Casualties and losses
16–21 killed 3 wounded	15–25 killed

A skirmish at Tegalreja, the estate of Yogyakartan Prince Diponegoro, took place on 20 July 1825. The incident took place following a Dutch–Yogyakartan attempt to capture Diponegoro in order to prevent a brewing rebellion, which had in turn been incited by a government road project. The Dutch–Yogyakartan force failed to capture Diponegoro, who would escape to Selarong and trigger the Java War for the next five years.

== Prelude ==
By early 1825, Yogyakarta Sultanate's Prince Diponegoro along with his political allies had become estranged from Yogyakarta's court (under chief minister Danureja IV), and developed further grievances against Dutch officials – especially Resident in Yogyakarta Anthonië Hendrik Smissaert. He had been preparing for a general rebellion since late 1824, conspiring with other officials and gathering weapons at his feudal estate at Tegalreja. Diponegoro initially planned to launch his rebellion in mid-August 1825. On 17 June 1825, Smissaert began a road repair project around Yogyakarta. One of the repaired roads passed through Tegalreja, and road workers began planting road marker stakes within Diponegoro's estate. Diponegoro was not informed of the project, and scuffles broke out between the road workers against Diponegoro's men and local villagers.

== Skirmish ==
By July, a large group of Diponegoro's supporters had gathered in Tegalreja due to news of the fights. Diponegoro had by then sent his family along with his treasury to a secondary base at Selarong Cave in anticipation of war. Dutch or Yogyakartan action against him was delayed due to leaves taken by both Smissaert and Danureja IV. The officials only met on 18 July, after Diponegoro had demanded Danureja IV's removal. A series of delegations were sent to Tegalreja in an attempt to negotiate with Diponegoro, including one led by two senior Yogyakartan nobles. This was followed up by a contingent of Dutch and Yogyakartan troops on 20 July. The group had intended to capture Diponegoro to stop the outbreak of a revolt, but Diponegoro was informed of their plans through his network in Yogyakarta. The contingent included troops of the Yogyakarta kraton, some troops sent by Paku Alam II, and a Dutch detachment of 50 troops with 2 artillery pieces dispatched by Smissaert's assistant P. F. H. Chevallier.

After the failure of negotiation attempts by the two nobles, a fight broke out between the detachment and some of Diponegoro's supporters (mostly local villagers) upon their arrival in Tegalreja. Dutch accounts recorded the number of Diponegoro supporters at about 1,500. The Dutch detachment responded with a volley fire of rifles and artillery, which caused Diponegoro and his men to escape through the surrounding inundated rice fields. Not wanting to risk their artillery, the contingent did not pursue and returned to Yogyakarta. Between 15 and 25 of Diponegoro's supporters were killed, while a Dutch sergeant was killed with three wounded. Diponegoro in his later autobiography claimed that 80 Dutch were killed plus one Dutch hussar, though this figure was likely inaccurate. The Yogyakarta soldiers suffered 15 to 20 killed.

== Aftermath ==
Diponegoro and his supporters largely escaped Tegalreja, and by the following day had arrived at Selarong Cave. There, on 21 July 1825, Diponegoro formally declared his revolt. His estate at Tegalreja was burned down by the Dutch troops. A museum commemorating Diponegoro stands today at the former estate.
