= Josephus Jacobus van Geen =

Dutch general (1773–1846)

- Portrait of Van Geen by Waanders (1831)
- Born: 1 September 1773; Ghent, Austrian Netherlands
- Died: 10 November 1846 (aged 73); Rijswijk, Netherlands
- Children: Mattheus van Geen
- Military career
- Allegiance: States of Brabant; French First Republic; Batavian Republic; Kingdom of Holland; First French Empire; United Kingdom of the Netherlands
- Branch: Infantry
- Service years: 1789–1841
- Rank: General
- Commands: Second Boni expedition (1825); Dutch forces in the Java War (1825–1828); 6th Command, Namur; 1st Division, Breda
- Conflicts: French Revolutionary Wars; Anglo-Russian invasion of Holland; Peninsular War; Java War; Belgian Revolution; Ten Days' Campaign
- Awards: Military William Order (1816, 1829); Legion of Honour (1813)

Josephus Jacobus, Baron van Geen (1 September 1773 (Note: Sources disagree on his birth year. The Nieuw Nederlandsch Biografisch Woordenboek and the Nationaal Archief finding aid both give 1 September 1773, while the Biographisch woordenboek der Nederlanden gives 1 September 1776.) – 10 November 1846) was a Dutch military general. Born in Ghent, he served in the armies of the States of Brabant, revolutionary France, the Batavian Republic, the Kingdom of Holland, the First French Empire, and, after 1814, the Netherlands.

In 1825 he commanded the Dutch expedition against Bone and Suppa on Celebes, and he then led the Dutch field army in the Java War against Diponegoro, first under Hendrik Merkus de Kock and later in his own right, until he handed the supreme command back to De Kock in March 1828. During the Belgian Revolution he remained loyal to the Dutch government and held the citadel of Namur until October 1830, and in August 1831 he led the 1st Division in the Ten Days' Campaign. He was a Knight Third Class of the Military William Order from 1816, a Commander of the order from 1829, and an officer of the French Legion of Honour.

== Early life and service in Europe ==
Van Geen was the third son of Arnoldus van Geen and Jodoca Lietz. He attended secondary school in Leuven, and in 1789 he entered the service of the States of Brabant, which had deposed Emperor Joseph II as duke. After the States' army dispersed in November 1790, he enlisted in July 1791 in a corps of South Netherlandish exiles gathered in France, and he was appointed second lieutenant in 1792. His corps fought alongside the French army, and he became a first lieutenant during the siege of Willemstad in March 1793 and served in the garrison of Valenciennes while British and Austrian forces besieged it that summer. He was wounded several times in 1793 and 1794. (Note: Van der Aa places a hand wound at Valenciennes in 1793, a sabre cut to the head at Tournai in 1794, and a serious knee wound at Waalwijk in the same year. The NNBW instead records a hand wound at Valenciennes, a sabre blow to the head at Walem on 16 July 1794, and a grapeshot wound to the thigh shortly afterwards.) After Jean-Charles Pichegru invaded the northern Netherlands in 1795, Van Geen entered the service of the Batavian Republic as a first lieutenant, fought near Düsseldorf in 1796, and was promoted to captain on 11 December 1797.

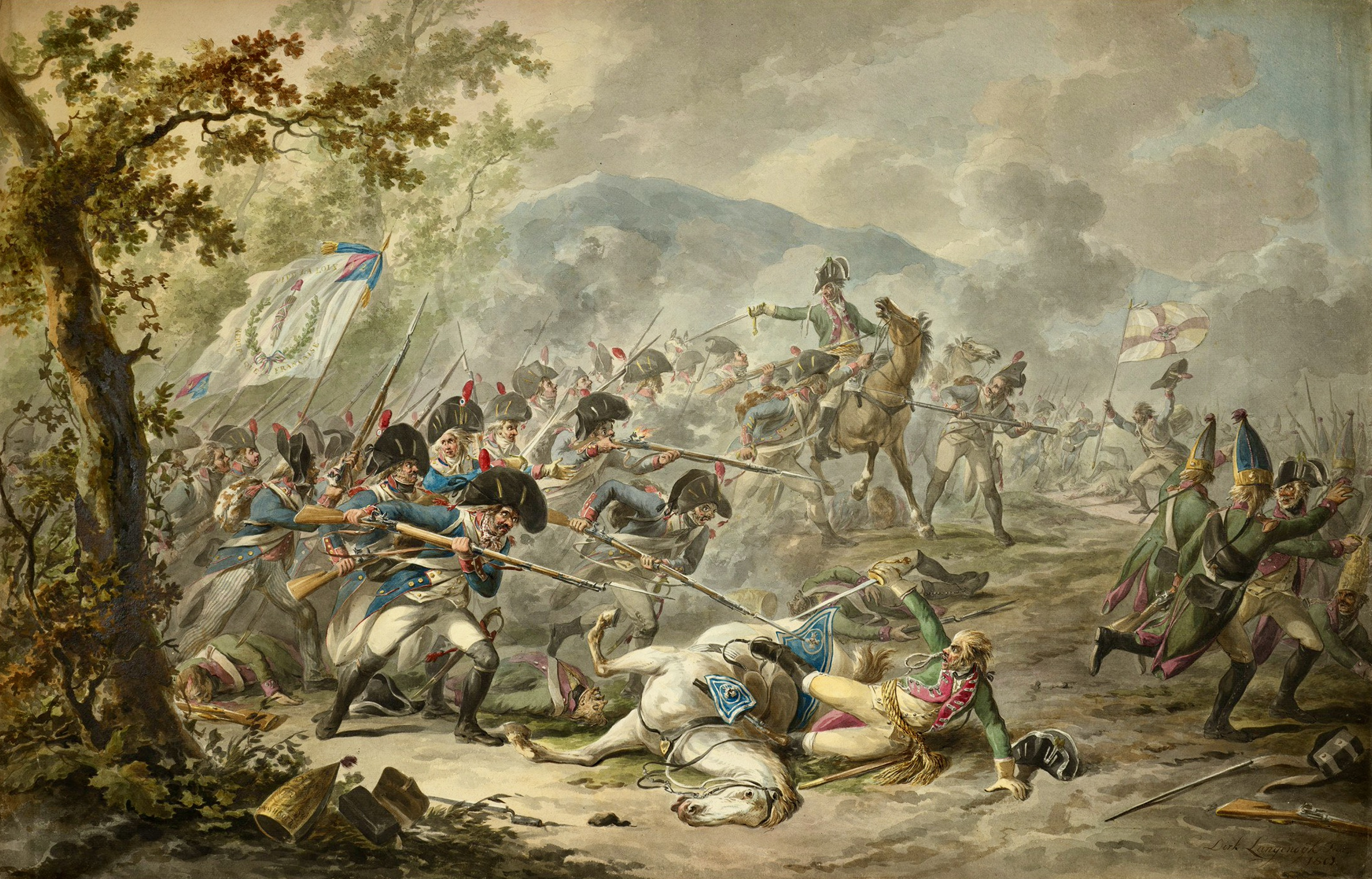
Dirk Langendijk's painting of the capture of the Russian general Fersen in 1799

During the Anglo-Russian invasion of Holland in 1799 he commanded a battalion of chasseurs under David Hendrik Chassé, and he was wounded in the right leg on 10 September. He was taken prisoner by the British near Schoorl on 19 September but was soon exchanged. In the German campaigns of 1805 and 1806 he commanded the 2nd regiment of chasseurs, and he became a lieutenant colonel on 15 February 1807. He was then transferred to the guard of King Louis Bonaparte, who awarded him the Order of the Union. On 29 August 1809 he became colonel of the 8th line regiment, and he served with it in the Zeeland campaign of that year.

After Napoleon annexed the Netherlands, Van Geen entered French service. In June 1811 he led part of his regiment to Bayonne and on to Portugal, and by hiding his men in a cemetery at San Cristoval he saved an important convoy, which earned him the Legion of Honour. He did not reach the army under Marmont until 15 March 1812, and at Salamanca on 22 July he saved a regimental standard, after which he also distinguished himself at Burgos and Pamplona. He became an officer of the Legion of Honour on 14 December 1813, after going on sick leave to La Rochelle that November. He returned to the Netherlands on 14 October 1814 and took up service as a colonel, and on 21 April 1815 he became a major general stationed at Leuven. He did not fight at Waterloo, but he was given command at Namur on 29 June 1815 and was appointed provincial commander in Utrecht on 21 December 1818. On 24 November 1816 he was made a Knight Third Class of the Military William Order. (Note: Van der Aa says the award was a reward for Van Geen's handling of the command at Namur, while the Ministry of Defence database gives its reason as earlier services.)

== Dutch East Indies ==
In November 1819 Van Geen was detached to the army in the Dutch East Indies, and he travelled there with his son Mattheus. After his arrival in August 1820 he was appointed commander of the infantry and, depending on the source, of the artillery or the cavalry. (Note: The NNBW says infantry and artillery, while the Nationaal Archief finding aid, citing a decree of the Governor-General of 14 August 1820, says infantry and cavalry.) During a journey through Java and Madura in 1822, he assessed conditions on the islands, and the influence he gained over the Madurese chiefs later helped bring many Madurese into the Dutch auxiliary troops.

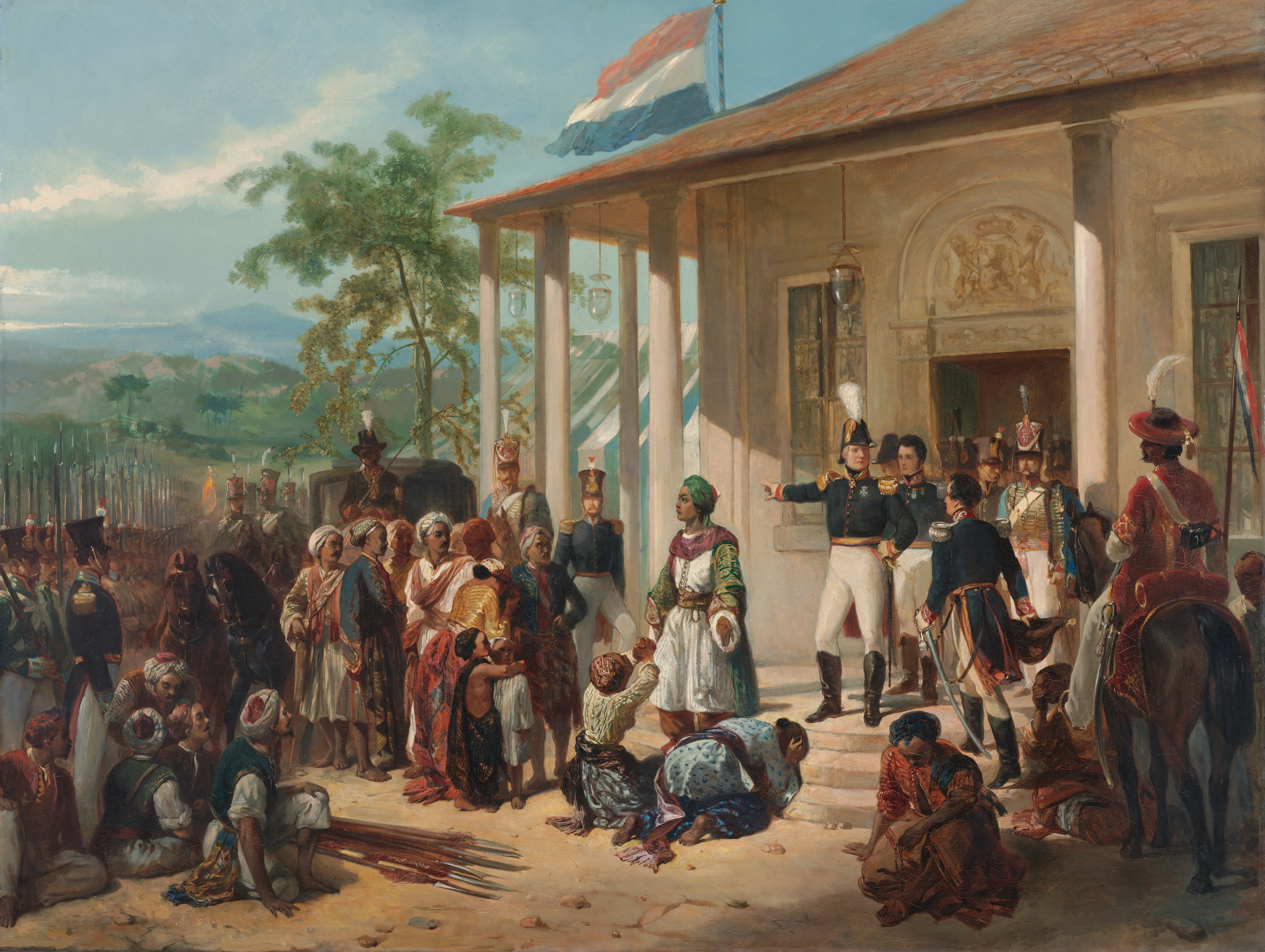
Nicolaas Pieneman's painting of Diponegoro's submission to De Kock in 1830

In 1824 the rulers of Bone and Suppa in South Celebes rose against Dutch authority, and an expedition under Lieutenant Colonel Hubert Joseph Jean Lambert de Stuers returned without accomplishing its aims. Van Geen was then given command of a larger army and fleet and ordered to subdue the two states. He reached Makassar in January 1825, restored order on the south coast, and then launched the main attack on Bone, beginning on 25 March. He overcame very stubborn resistance even though fever badly weakened his troops, and on 27 June he attacked Suppa, where order was restored after some time. A later review in De Gids described the campaign as short and ending in complete victory. (Note: The force is known in Dutch historiography as the Second Boni expedition.)

Van Geen arrived at Sedayu on 30 August 1825 and was ordered to go at once to Surabaya and take command of the troops sent against the uprising of Diponegoro, the uncle of the underage sultan of Yogyakarta. Serving under De Kock, he took energetic measures in September and October that saved Semarang, where rebellion was simmering, and he subdued the rebels at Demak. According to De Gids, he scattered the rebel army at Demak on 15 September. When De Kock took over as acting Governor-General on 31 December 1825, he passed the command of the army to Van Geen, who was formally appointed commander of the troops by decree that day.

De Kock resumed the supreme command on 2 April 1826, and on 28 July Van Geen was surrounded after crossing the Progo River and was saved only by the timely arrival of one of his detachments. He was promoted to lieutenant general in 1826 with orders to return to the Netherlands, but these were not carried out once they reached Batavia. After a stay in Batavia to recover his health, he returned to the war in August 1827, again holding the supreme command, and he handed it back to De Kock on 13 March 1828. He sailed for the Netherlands on 24 June 1828.

== Belgian Revolution and later career ==
On 20 February 1829 Van Geen was appointed commander of the 6th Command at Namur, and on 4 July 1829 he was named a Commander of the Military William Order for his service in the Java War. Although he had been born in Ghent, he stayed loyal to the Dutch government in the Belgian Revolution. When nearly all of the Namur garrison deserted, he withdrew into the citadel with the troops who stayed loyal, and he held out until 5 October 1830 before marching to Antwerp with 250 of the 4,000 men he had commanded. There he received a proposal from the defected general Nypels to join the Belgian side, which he left unanswered. On 26 October he was given command of all troops withdrawn from Belgium and set up his headquarters first in Ginneken and soon after in Breda, and on 21 November he drove Belgian forces out of the village of Essen.

He handed this command to Prince Frederick on 23 March 1831 and soon afterwards took charge of the 1st Division, the westernmost Dutch formation in North Brabant. In the Ten Days' Campaign of 2 to 12 August 1831 his division marched through Baarle-Nassau and Turnhout to Diest and then to Boutersem, while Belgian troops under Niellon harassed its flank. Fighting was heaviest at Sint-Joris-Winge and Boutersem, and Van Geen entered Leuven with the Prince of Orange on 12 August. He then resumed command of the 1st Division at Breda and held it until his retirement on 1 January 1841. He was raised to the Dutch nobility with the title of baron, hereditary by primogeniture, in 1831, and he was given the rank of general on 23 March 1845.

== Personal life ==
On 14 November 1795 Van Geen married Anthonetta van Meeteren, a daughter of the dean of the merchants' guild at Dordrecht. They had four sons, all of whom became soldiers and two of whom served under him in the East Indies, and a daughter. The sons included Mattheus van Geen (1801–1866), a lieutenant general and Knight of the Military William Order, and Dirk Wilhelmus (1796–1823), who also held the order. Their daughter Antonetta Josephina (1809–1862) married the major general Louis Philippe Jacob Snabilié in 1833.

After his retirement, Van Geen settled at Veldzigt, an estate near Rijswijk that he had bought in 1844. He died there on 10 November 1846, and a memorial print describes him as a retired general of infantry and a member of the Legion of Honour. He was buried in the local cemetery. His heirs sold Veldzigt in 1847. Part of his correspondence from 1825 to 1828, including drafts of letters to De Kock, survives in the Nationaal Archief among the papers of Nicolaus Engelhard.

== Awards ==
- Order of the Union (1807)
- Legion of Honour, Knight (1813)
- Legion of Honour, Officer (14 December 1813)
- Military William Order, Knight Third Class (24 November 1816)
- Military William Order, Commander (4 July 1829)
- Order of the Netherlands Lion, Commander (31 August 1831)
- Metal Cross for 1830–1831 (31 August 1831)
