= Java War =

Dutch colonial war in Java (1825–1830)

- Part of the Dutch colonization of Indonesia
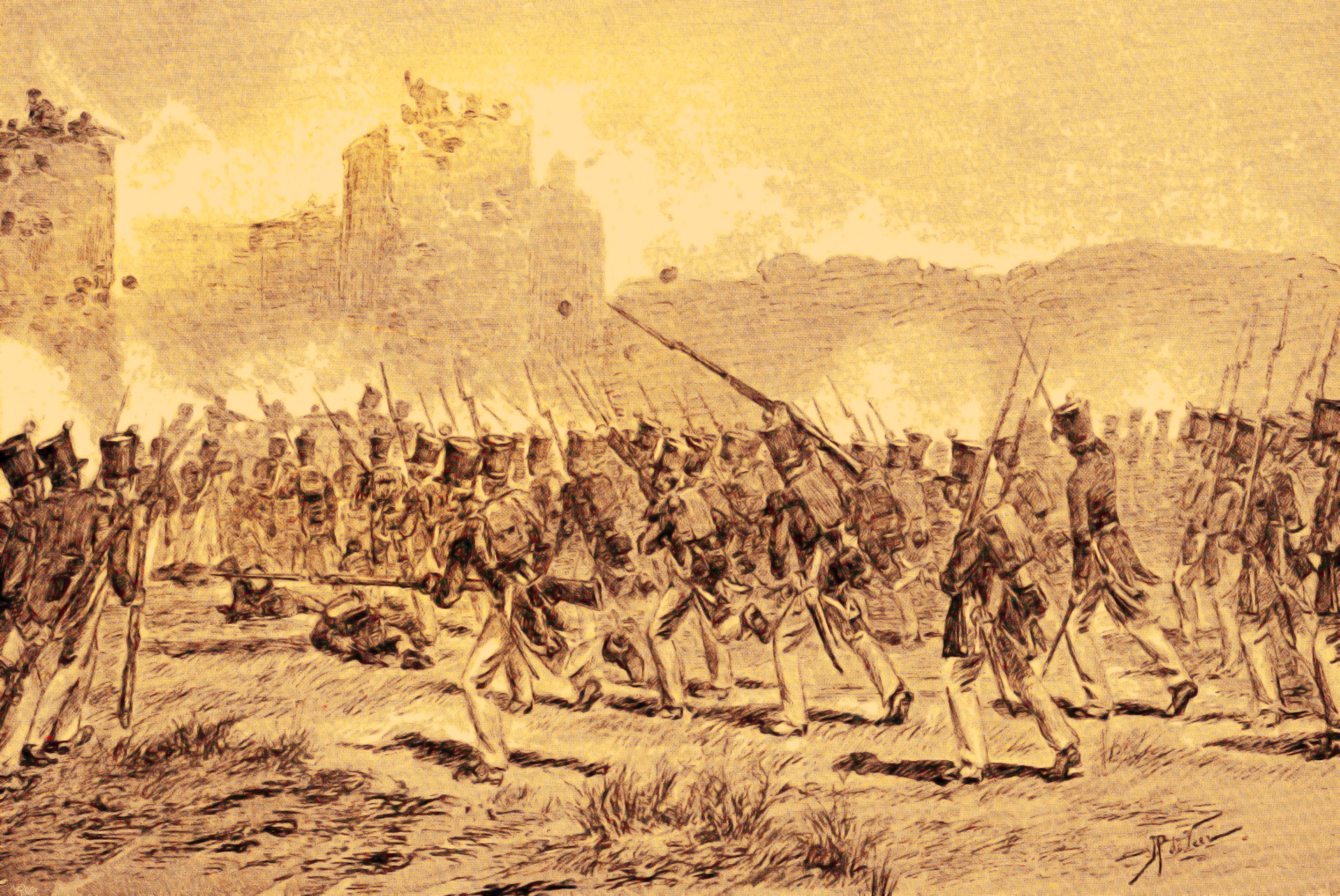
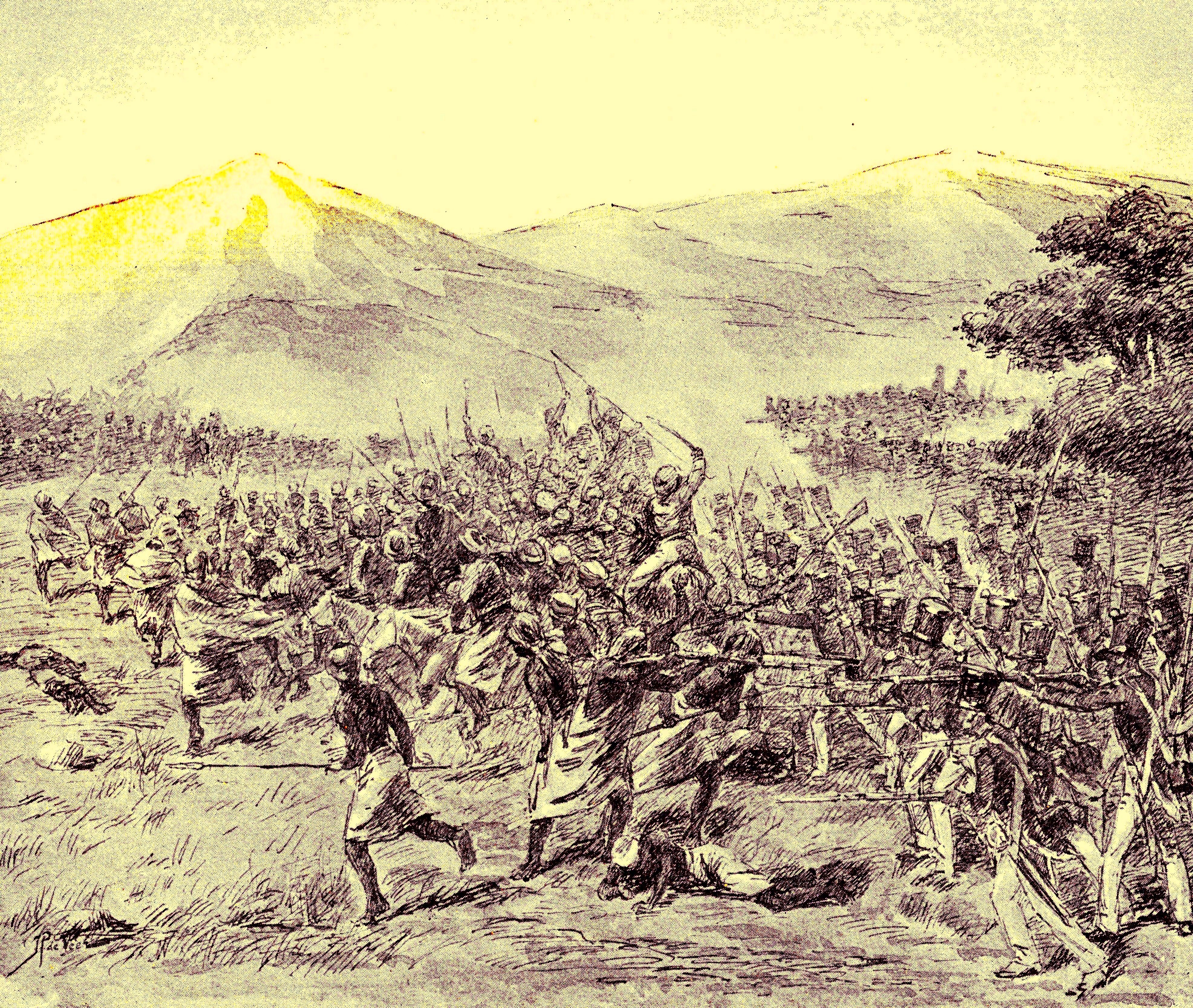
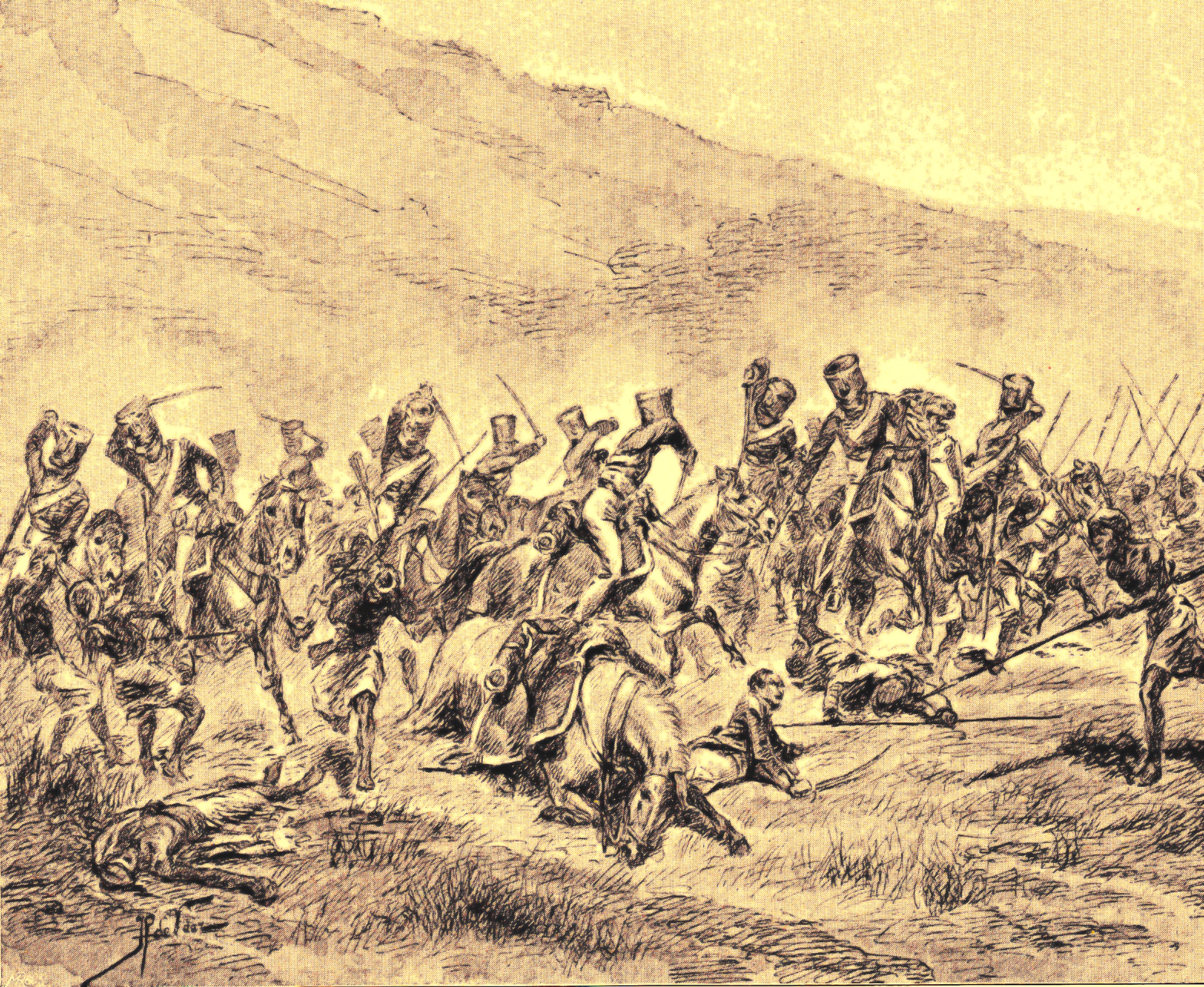
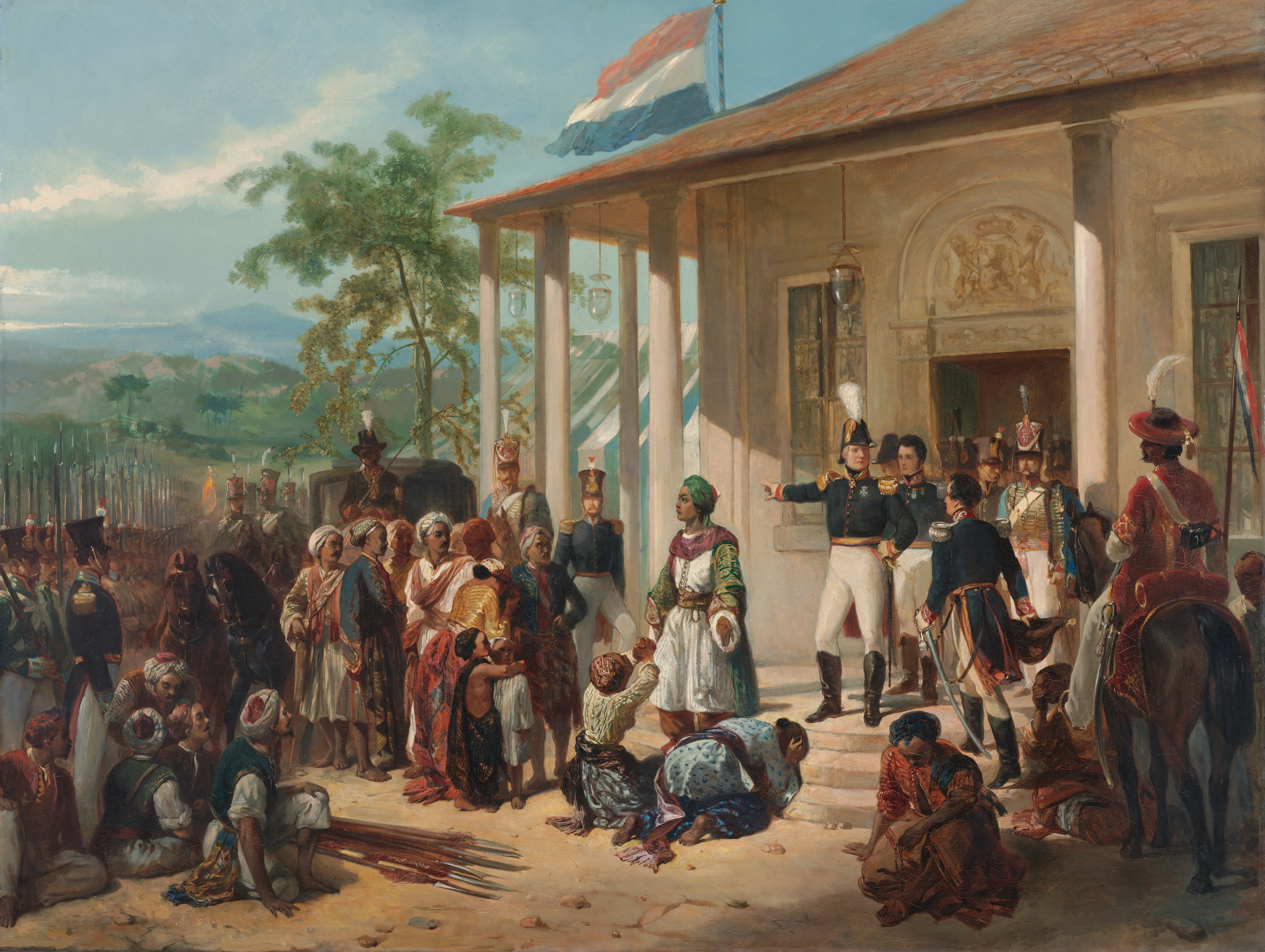
- From top, left to right: Storming of Pleret, attack on Diponegoro near Gawok, charge of Dutch hussars at Magelang, Submission of Dipo Negoro to De Kock
Date	20 July 1825 – 28 March 1830
Location	Central and East Java
Result	Dutch victory; Diponegoro exiled to Sulawesi

Belligerents
Dutch East Indies; Mangkunegaran; Pakualaman; Yogyakarta (Note: Yogyakarta and Surakarta did not fully commit against Diponegoro. A large number of aristocrats openly sided with Diponegoro, while others provided covert support.); Surakarta	Javanese rebels

Commanders and leaders
Hendrik M. de Kock; Josephus Jacobus van Geen; Mangkunegara II; Leonard du Bus; Johannes van den Bosch	Diponegoro (POW); Sentot Prawirodirdjo (surrendered); Kyai Maja (surrendered); Jayakusuma I †

Strength
c. 26,000 (Note: At the outbreak of the war, the Dutch colonial army in the Indies numbered 12,500. A further 13,000 would be recruited throughout the war. Dutch reports in 1828 stated that the army had 24,685 infantrymen and 1,133 cavalry, including defectors.): 3,000 elite corps of Dutch and German	>20,000 (Note: At the beginning of the war, Diponegoro divided his forces into sixteen units with a nominal strength of 1,000 men and several royal guard units. However, spontaneous uprisings by local villagers numbered as high as 55,000 and other armies not directly under Diponegoro's command also operated, numbering as high as 8,000.)

Casualties and losses
1825–1827: 15,000 dead (8,000 European, 7,000 local recruits) 1827–1829: 2,000 elite corps of Dutch and German killed	Up to 20,000 killed
- 200,000 civilians dead

The Java War (Javanese: ꦥꦼꦫꦁꦗꦮ; Dutch: De Java-oorlog; Indonesian: Perang Jawa), also known in Indonesia as the Diponegoro War (Javanese: ꦥꦼꦫꦁꦢꦶꦥꦤꦼꦒꦫ; Indonesian: Perang Diponegoro), was an armed conflict in central and eastern Java from 1825 to 1830, between native Javanese rebels headed by Prince Diponegoro and the Dutch East Indies supported by Javanese princely states. It is considered a watershed in Javanese history, culture, and society.

During the early nineteenth century, declining Dutch power along with increased centralization of colonial authorities through brief French and British controls had changed the political order established after the 1755 Treaty of Giyanti, at the expense of the native Javanese princely states. After the deaths of Sultans of Yogyakarta Hamengkubuwono III and IV, along with the return of Dutch presence, Hamengkubuwono III's eldest son Diponegoro became estranged from Yogyakarta's regency of Hamengkubuwono V and with the colonial government. With a millenarian movement emerging and claimed visions of a holy war, Diponegoro would launch his rebellion following tensions caused by a government road project in July 1825.

Shortly after the outbreak of the revolt, rebel forces laid siege to Yogyakarta, which was lifted following the arrival of a large Dutch relief force under H. M. de Kock. Diponegoro and his forces moved north towards Surakarta, defeating Dutch forces in a series of engagements throughout mid-1826 before being defeated west of the city. Other leaders affiliated with the rebellion took up arms in Java's north coast and in East Java. The war transitioned into a guerilla war, with Dutch forces failing to stamp out guerilla activity due to Diponegoro's popular support and Dutch manpower shortages.

By 1827, Dutch forces began employing an extensive strategy of field fortifications (Benteng-stelsel), gradually limiting Diponegoro's ability to maneuver and control territory. The war turned against Diponegoro, and his territorial control began to shrink as rebel forces became confined to the west of Yogyakarta. Further rebel setbacks in 1828 and 1829 saw their remaining armies depleted, with many key commanders surrendering or killed in action. Following a defeat in September 1829, Diponegoro led just a small group of guerillas. During an attempt at negotiations, Diponegoro was captured while meeting with de Kock in Magelang, and he was exiled to Sulawesi where he died in 1855.

The war had disastrous consequences for Java, marking the last significant armed resistance to Dutch rule until the Indonesian National Revolution over a century later. The princely states lost much of their remaining powers and territories, giving the Dutch uncontested rule over the island. At least 200,000 Javanese civilians were killed by violence or the resulting disease and starvation, with military losses of 15,000 dead for the Dutch military and around 20,000 dead for the rebels. While the costs of waging the war for the Dutch were heavy, the implementation of the Cultivation System in its immediate aftermath generated enormous revenues for the colonial government.

== Background ==
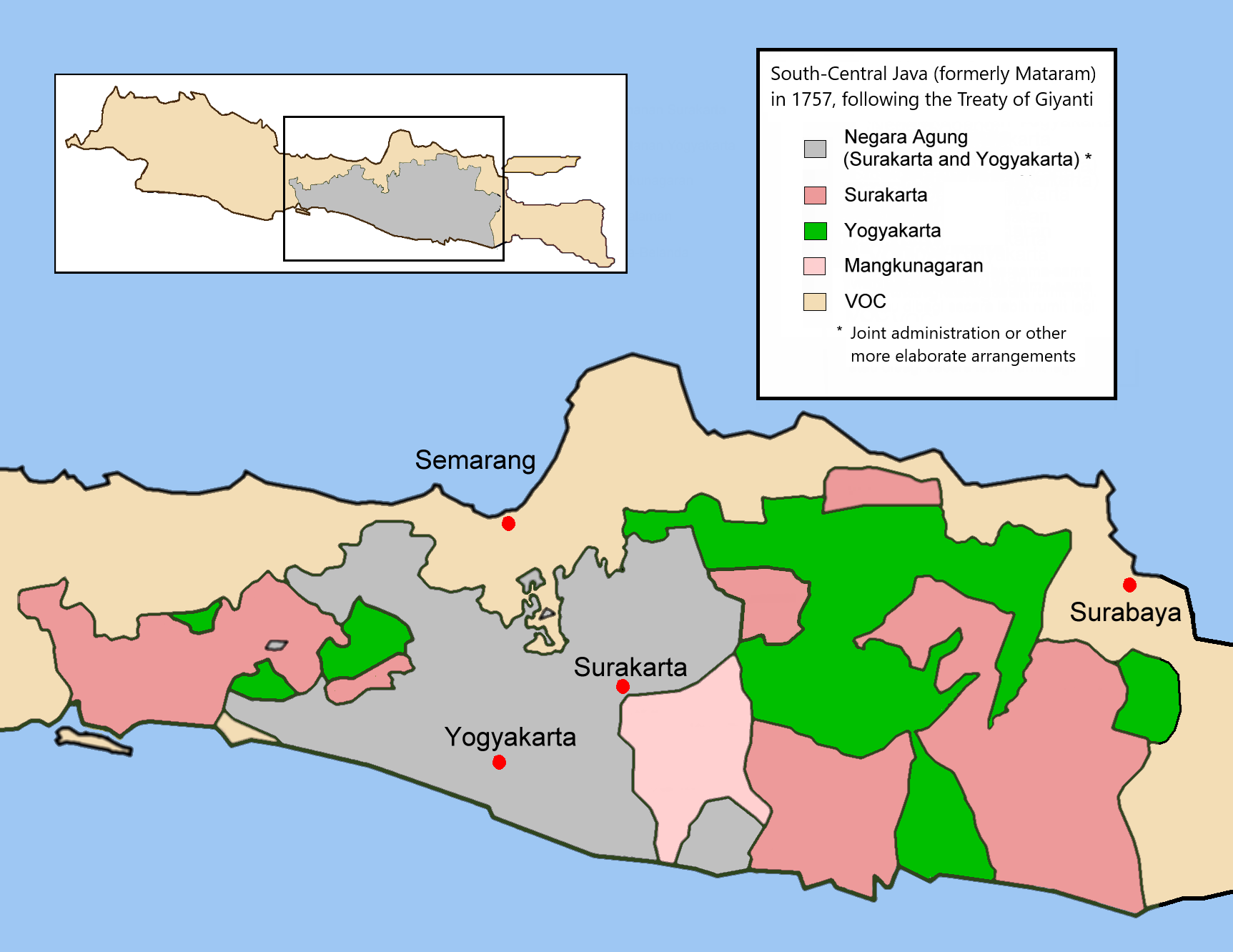
Map of Central Java in 1757 after the Treaty of Giyanti and creation of Mangkunegaran

The 1755 Treaty of Giyanti, signed between the Dutch East India Company (VOC) and Javanese rulers, divided the Mataram Sultanate into the Vorstenlanden (princely states) of the Yogyakarta Sultanate and Surakarta Sunanate; another princely state, Mangkunegaran, was formed in 1757. Ushering in a period of peace after the Javanese Wars of Succession, the treaty led to a period of major population growth in Java. Due to relative weakness of the Dutch in the late 18th century, the princely states possessed de facto sovereignty. The Fourth Anglo-Dutch War, the French Revolutionary and Napoleonic Wars and the VOC's dissolution in 1799 further weakened the Dutch position in the region, with colonial authorities in Batavia requesting assistance from the princely states to defend Dutch territories in Java.

In 1806, Herman Willem Daendels became Governor-General of the Dutch East Indies. Daendels aimed to weaken the princely states and prepare defences against a British invasion. He harshly enforced colonial authority, boosting anti-Dutch sentiment in the Yogyakarta court and causing an abortive armed revolt by Yogyakarta bupati Rongga Prawiradirja in 1810. In the following year, British forces occupied Java. Anglo-Yogyakarta relations soon worsened, and 1,200 British troops sacked the Yogyakarta keraton on 20 June 1812, deposing Sultan Hamengkubuwono II in favor of his son Hamengkubuwono III. (Note: Hamengkubuwono II had previously also been deposed by Daendels in favor of Hamengkubuwono III in December 1810, but retook the throne in 1811. He would later be reinstalled during the war, on 17 August 1826, and remained Sultan until his death in 1828.) During their four-year occupation of Java, the British split off part of Yogyakarta to form Pakualaman, introduced a cash-based land tax which caused hardship to peasants, and forced the princely states to limit the size of their militaries and cede territory.

=== Diponegoro ===
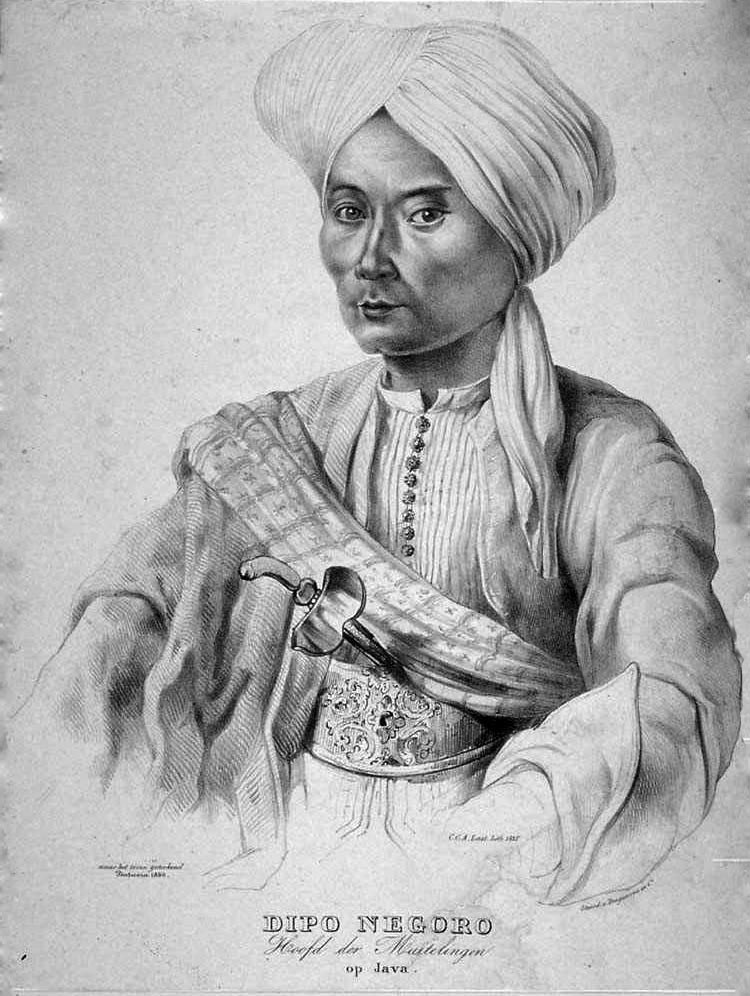
1835 portrait of Diponegoro

Prince Diponegoro (born 1785) was the eldest son of Hamengkubuwono III. Through his mother, he claimed ancestry from the Wali Sanga, early apostles of Islam in Java. In 1805, Diponegoro made a pilgrimage to the southern coast of Java, and later wrote that he received visions there from Sunan Kalijaga and Nyai Roro Kidul. Diponegoro also wrote of warnings of the destruction of Yogyakarta and ruin of Java. Shortly prior to the British sack of Yogyakarta, he was offered the position of crown prince under his father, but refused the offer, passing the position on to his younger brother. Diponegoro had likely been offered the position due to the assistance he provided to the British. Hamengkubuwono III died in 1814, and with his successor still being a boy, Paku Alam I was installed as regent.

Following the restoration of Dutch rule in Java in 1816, Diponegoro's view of the Dutch and the Sultanate began deteriorating due to tax collection disputes and the arrest of a well-known religious leader. He also opposed the introduction of a land rent system in the late 1810s. A millenarian movement began to emerge in the Javanese countryside, fueled by an 1821 cholera epidemic and the eruption of Mount Merapi in 1822. A minor uprising by Diponegoro's great-uncle was suppressed in 1822. Hamengkubuwono IV died in December 1822, and with the new Sultan Hamengkubuwono V being two years old, Diponegoro was appointed one of his guardians. His relationship with other guardians was poor.

In 1823, the Dutch colonial official A. H. Smissaert was appointed as the resident in Yogyakarta. Smissaert alienated the native aristocracy by offering to represent the young Sultan in a royal ceremony, and further angered them by demanding heavy indemnities after abolishing the land rent. Diponegoro was appointed to negotiate indemnities, but the negotiations went poorly, and by 1824 Diponegoro refused to be involved.

== Outbreak ==
Political moves from other guardians of Hamengkubuwono V in 1824 resulted in the expulsion of several of Diponegoro's allies from court. Diponegoro also experienced humiliation from Smissaert and his officials. In early 1825, Dutch authorities annexed some territory from the Sultanate as a lease, without consulting Diponegoro in his capacity as the Sultan's guardian. During this period, Diponegoro claimed to have experienced a series of visions urging him to engage in a holy war. By late 1824, he began meeting with other Yogyakartan officials to plan a rebellion, prepared armaments and supplies, and contacting armed bandit groups. On 17 June 1825, Smissaert ordered a road near Yogya to be repaired, which happened to pass by Diponegoro's estate of Tegalreja. Occasional fights broke out between the road workers and Diponegoro's men, and by July, a large number of Diponegoro's supporters began gathering at Tegalreja for military action. On 20 July, a detachment of Dutch and Yogyakartan troops was sent to Tegalreja in order to arrest Diponegoro, and after a skirmish Diponegoro retreated with his men to Selarong Cave. Diponegoro declared his rebellion on 21 July 1825.

== Forces ==
=== Dutch ===
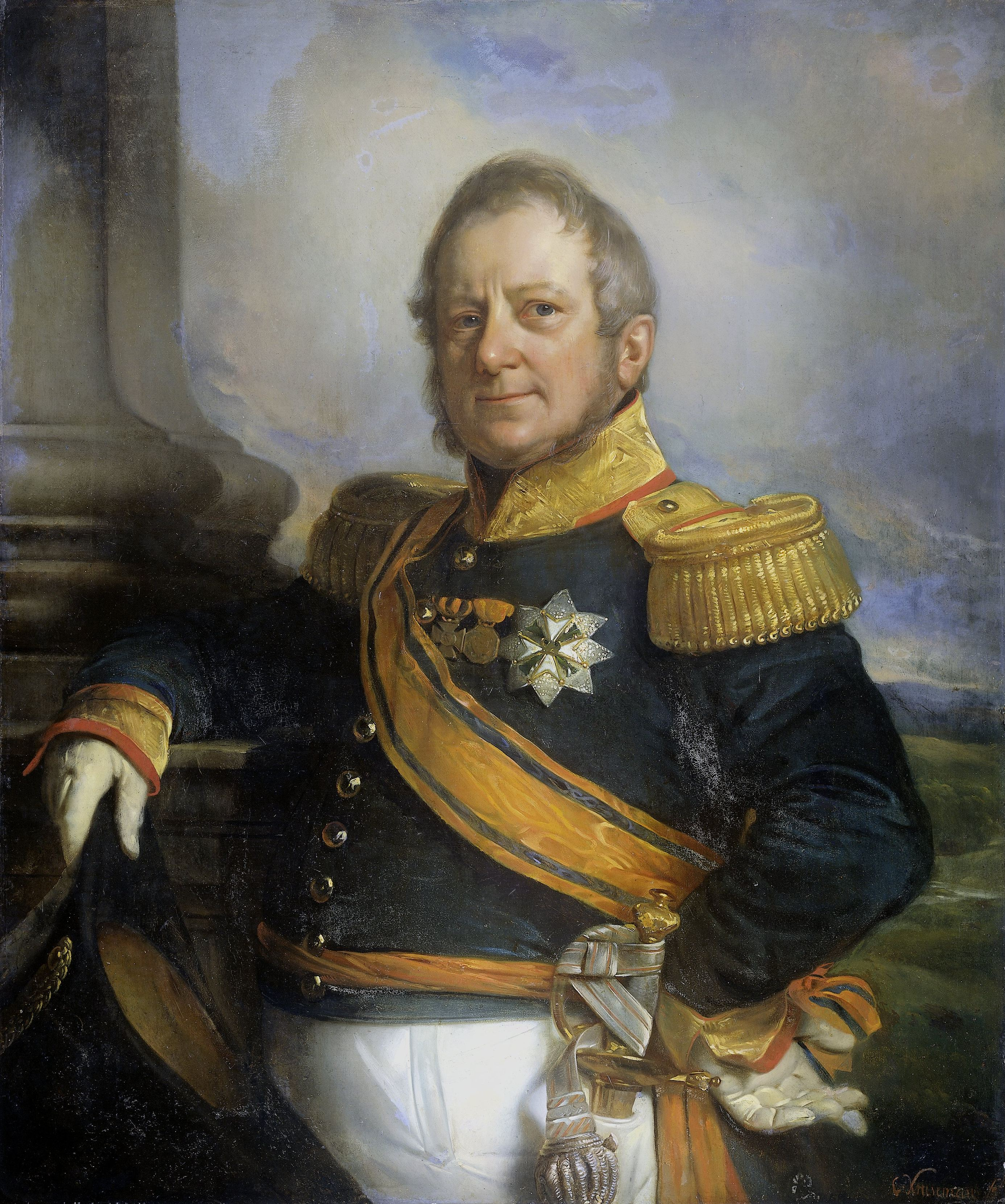
De Kock, commander of Dutch forces in the war

Upon receiving news of Diponegoro's uprising, Dutch forces in the region quickly moved to Yogyakarta. Some of the Dutch forces in the archipelago was engaged in an expedition in South Sulawesi, and they were recalled to Java. Overall Dutch military command in the Indies, under Hendrik Merkus de Kock, had 12,500 men, of which half were native Indonesian recruits whose loyalties were doubted by the Dutch. He would later receive additional troops – 3,154 European soldiers from the Netherlands and over 10,000 native auxiliaries recruited during the war. De Kock's Javanese auxiliaries were equipped similarly with Diponegoro's men, and had similar issues on loyalty to the Dutch cause. A number of the Dutch soldiers and officers were veterans of the Napoleonic Wars, who had moved to Java to seek new fortunes.

The Dutch also made heavy use of soldiers from elsewhere in the archipelago. In 1828, for instance, while auxiliaries from Java and nearby Madura numbered just over 5,000, auxiliaries were also recruited from North Sulawesi and Gorontalo (~1,300 men), Buton (700 men), and the Maluku Islands (850 men). Balinese kingdoms also provided 1,000 soldiers as mercenaries to the Dutch. Regular Dutch troops were armed with flintlock muskets, and these were also captured and used by the rebels.

=== Princely states ===
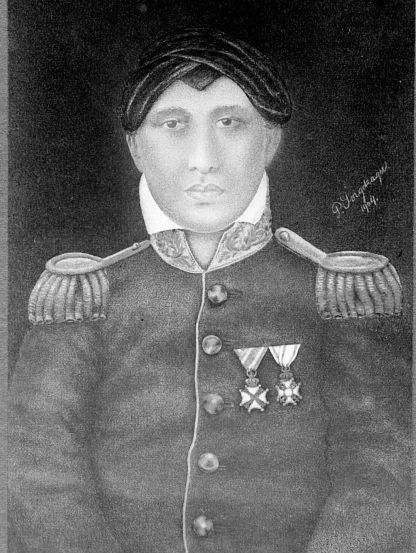
Mangkunegara II in Dutch-style military uniform

The leadership of both Yogyakarta and Surakarta were split: British historian Peter Carey listed fifteen princes of the Yogyakartan royal family which sided with Diponegoro with a similar number remaining loyal to the Sultan, while Dutch records described the Surakarta Sunan Pakubuwono VI as "ambiguous" with a court divided between Dutch and Diponegoro supporters. On the other hand, the Mangkunegaran under Mangkunegara II took a more active pro-Dutch stance in the war, with the Mangkunegaran Legion campaigning independently against rebels in Surakartan and Yogyakartan territory until its defeat in 1826. He would later be given a Military Order of William award for his role in the war. The Pakualaman under Paku Alam I similarly remained loyal to the Dutch.

During British rule, the Sultanate of Yogyakarta alone was able to raise around 10,000 soldiers on a short notice. The cessions of land in 1812 had weakened the states, however. Throughout the war itself, the raising of troops by the princely states was limited, and were primarily small units policing secured territories. The Mangkunegaran Legion offered more troops, but due to lack of armaments, they were not raised. Dutch commanders throughout the war complained of the performance of troops provided by the Sunanate. Out of around 9,000 native auxiliary troops recorded by the Dutch in 1828, about 2,500 were part of the Mangkunegaran Legion.

=== Rebels ===
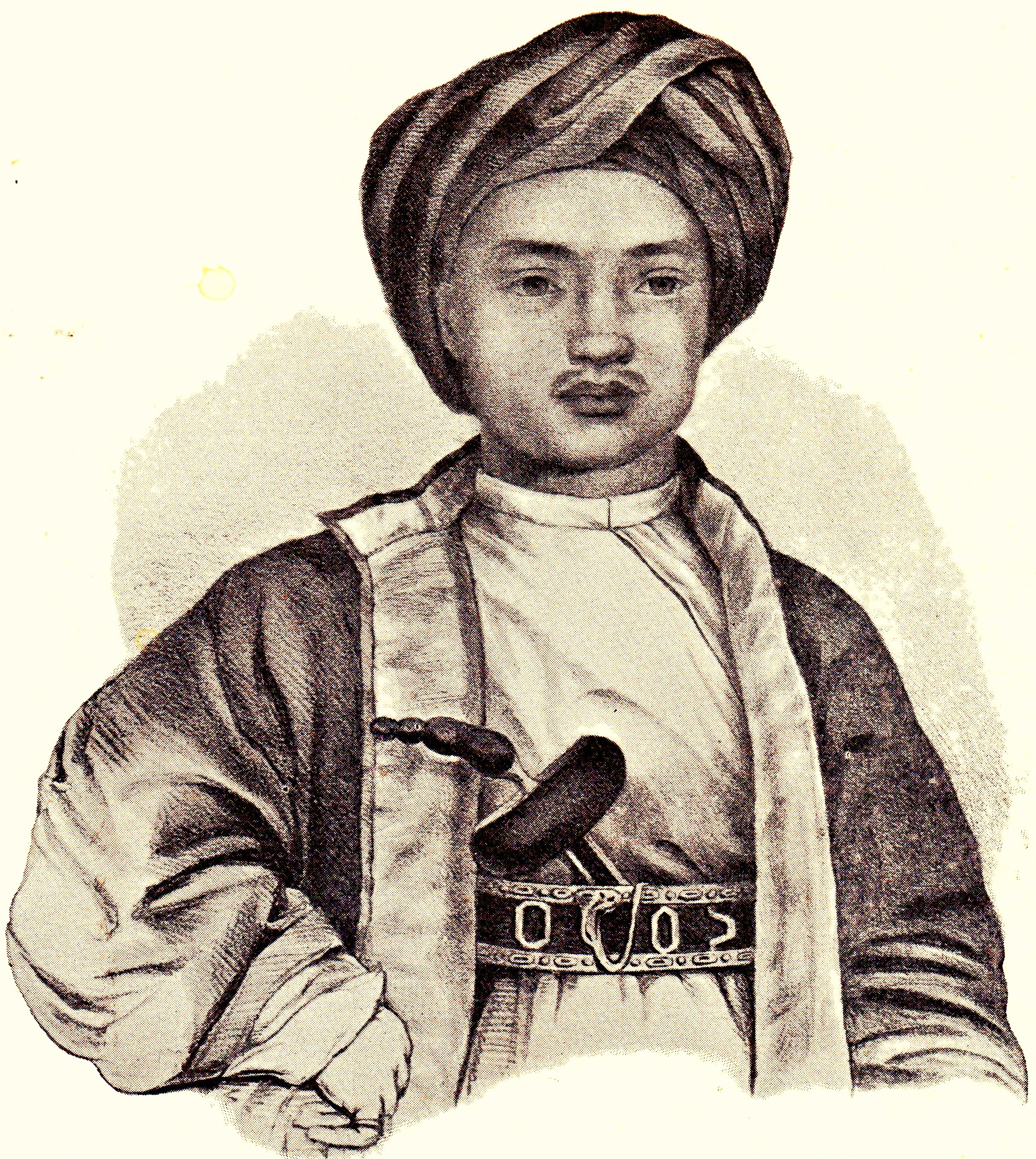
Sentot Prawirodirdjo, the rebel military commander

Diponegoro's forces quickly gathered at Selarong, with the Dutch reporting that "no fewer than seventy" members of the royal family joining him with their armed retinues. The men had limited numbers of firearms, being primarily equipped with Javanese traditional weapons such as bamboo spears. However, Diponegoro's men would also employ captured Dutch firearms and artillery. The rebels followed the organizational structure of the janissary units of the Ottoman Empire. Diponegoro subdivided his forces to sixteen commanders of noble origin, covering their own areas with a nominal force and appanage of 1,000 men and 10,000 households each, plus six units of royal guards. Diponegoro himself had a personal bodyguard of 300 to 400 cavalrymen and a similar number of armed men from a priestly order.

Overall military command was not held by Diponegoro, instead, it was held by Sentot Prawirodirdjo, son of the late rebel Rongga Prawiradirdja, late in the war. Other senior rebel leaders included Kyai Maja, Diponegoro's spiritual adviser, and Diponegoro's uncle Prince Jayakusuma. The army was initially financed through contributions from Javanese aristocrats siding with Diponegoro. Many villages also sided with Diponegoro's forces, and as these had been fortified prior to the war to prevent bandit raids, they became useful strongpoints for the rebellion. They also took control of abandoned Mataram forts.

During the guerilla war, rebels favored hiding in grassy areas near roads before using snipers to ambush Dutch formations, with cavalry units camouflaged by bamboo fences and local villagers armed with farming implements joining the fight to cut off Dutch lines of retreat. The villagers would also construct roadblocks from felled trees or sharpened bamboo stakes. Dutch authorities suspected British or American smugglers of selling firearms to Diponegoro. Rebels manufactured their own ammunition and gunpowder, while also receiving supplies from smugglers.

== Course of the war ==
=== Beginnings ===
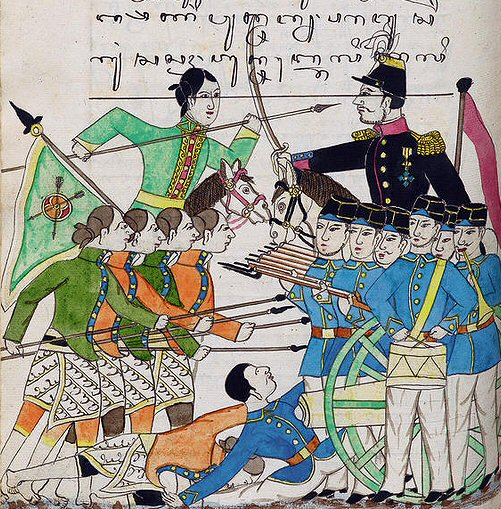
Javanese sketch of Diponegoro (top left) fighting at Selarong

Diponegoro's forces in Selarong received an early morale boost by a successful ambush and destruction of a Dutch column on its way to assembling in Yogyakarta, which also allowed the rebels to capture Dutch weapons. De Kock was appointed commissioner to the princely states on 26 July, giving him authority over military operations and civil affairs in the region. By 28 July, Diponegoro's forces had moved out of Selarong, and laid siege to Yogyakarta. As Dutch forces sent reinforcements from Semarang in an attempt to relieve the siege, further uprisings aligned with Diponegoro broke out in Dutch-controlled territory recently ceded by the princely states to the north and northwest of Yogyakarta.

The Dutch relief force, accompanied by troops from Sumenep and the Mangkunegaran, arrived in Yogyakarta in 19 August and prevented the city from falling. Dutch forces also reinforced the Magelang area, suppressing several uprisings there. The rebels would unsuccessfully assault Yogyakarta several times throughout August and September, until a relief force of 7,500 commanded by de Kock arrived in Yogyakarta on 25 September and ended the siege. De Kock attempted to negotiate with Diponegoro by September 1825, but Diponegoro rejected his offer. An attempt by Dutch forces to assault Selarong failed shortly after, as Diponegoro had evacuated his hideout. De Kock continued his attempt to capture Diponegoro throughout late 1825 and 1826, but despite a series of skirmishes and battles, failed to capture him. Dutch forces also captured in June 1826 a rebel strongpoint at Pleret, Mataram's old capital, following an assault.

Diponegoro's army began to march northwards, killing a large number of Yogyakartan nobles in an ambush, destroying a Dutch column near Mount Merapi and seizing a Dutch strongpoint. He linked up with a rebel force commanded by Kyai Maja and moved to assault de Kock's headquarters in Surakarta. However, disagreements between Kyai Maja and Diponegoro caused delays which allowed Dutch forces to concentrate in Surakarta. Diponegoro was defeated near Gawok west of Surakarta on 15 October 1826, shattering his numerical advantage and severely limiting the rebels' ability to engage in offensive operations.

=== Guerilla war ===
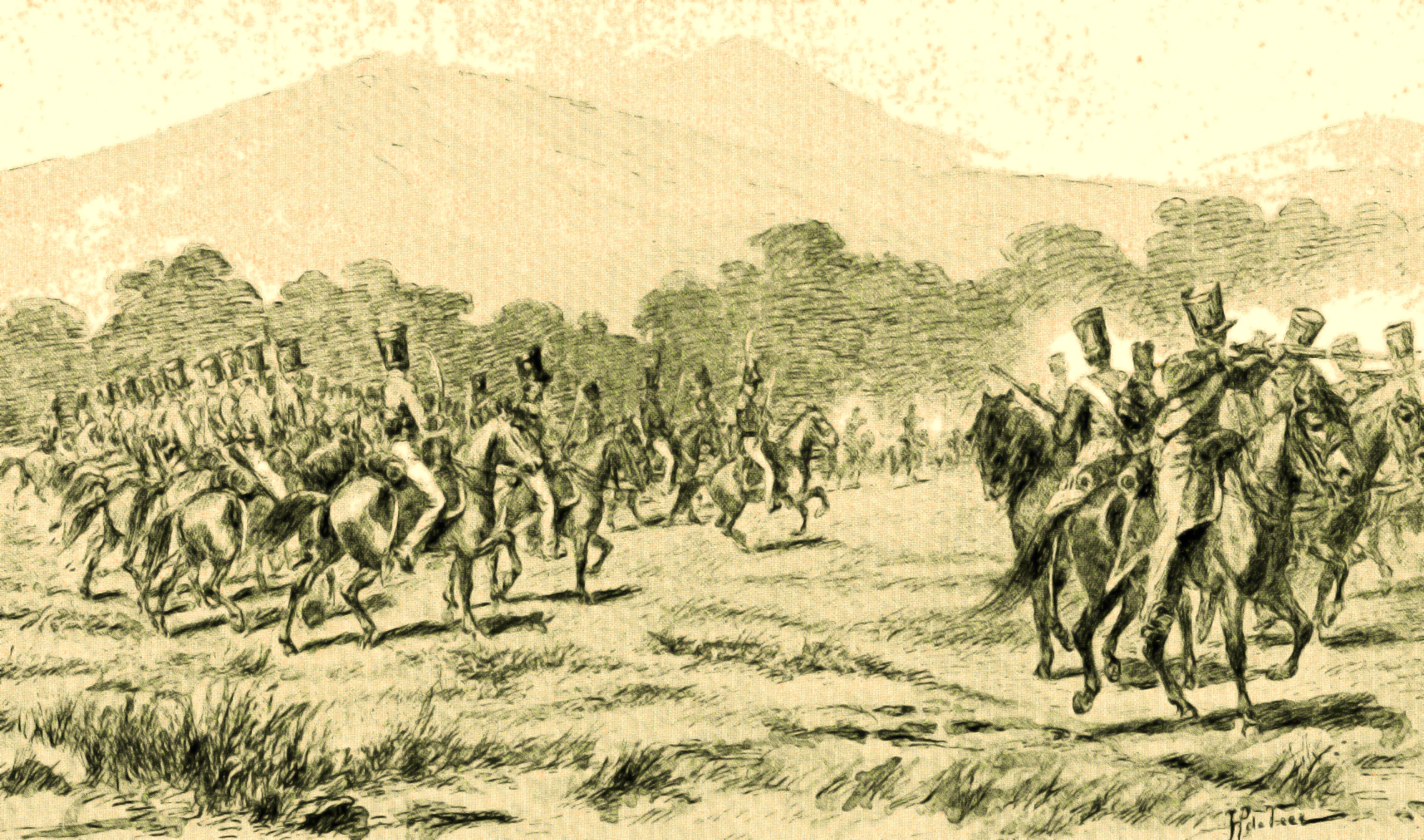
Drawing of a Dutch column near the village of Dekso, 1826

Diponegoro retreated westwards after his defeat at Gawok, still in command of a scattered army of around 5,000 and continuously receiving supplies and firearms through smugglers. Although he lost the core of his army, he continued to fight a guerilla war and retained control of much of the Yogyakarta Sultanate's countryside. On the other hand, Dutch forces were curtailed by disease, uncooperative local nobles, many of which held sympathies or outright sided with Diponegoro, and a hostile populace. By April 1827, 1,600 of de Kock's men had been killed, limiting his ability to control the countryside. Furthermore, the governor-general Leonard du Bus slashed government spending, limiting de Kock's ability to recruit native soldiers. De Kock would later compare Diponegoro's guerilla campaign with the war in the Vendée.

Between December 1826 and January 1827, little military action occurred, as both sides opted against attacking. Starting in February, Dutch forces went on the offensive, attacking Diponegoro's base several times between February and June and forcing him to move bases or temporarily retreat. Dutch forces began establishing field fortifications in 1827 on a large scale in order to secure key supply routes. After two of his commanders defected to the Dutch in July 1827, Diponegoro was defeated in a series of battles and was forced away from the city of Yogyakarta. By late 1827, Diponegoro's forces had scattered into smaller groups. Both sides agreed to a brief ceasefire to negotiate between August and September 1827, but no agreement was reached and fighting continued.

During the ceasefire, Diponegoro had moved west along the south coast, crossing into the Bagelen area west of Yogyakarta by October 1827. This caught Dutch forces stationed there by surprise, and after a series of assaults on Dutch strongpoints, Diponegoro's men were initially pushed inland. By early 1828, rebel forces in the vicinity of Yogyakarta and Surakarta had been reduced to small groups. These would be further reduced by a Dutch operation which lasted until July 1828, and more field fortifications were constructed to deny rebels the ability to regain control. Meanwhile, Diponegoro's men continued to cross into Bagelen, largely taking over its countryside by the end of the year while Dutch control was limited to the immediate vicinity of their fortifications.

Beyond the vicinity of Yogyakarta and Surakarta, other areas of Java also saw fighting. In the northeastern coast near Dutch-held Semarang, a rebel army operated under Prince Serang, supported by his mother Nyi Ageng Serang (in command of a cavalry unit). Prince Serang's forces reportedly had a strength of 8,000 at the beginning of the war. They surrendered in mid-1827. Another area of rebel activity was modern East Java – near Rembang under Raden Aria Sasradilaga (Diponegoro's brother-in-law), and around Ngawi and Madiun under Raden Ayu Yudakusuma. The two groups briefly merged in November 1827 – March 1828 until Sasradilaga's defeat, after which Yudokusumo continued her campaign until surrendering in October 1828. The Dutch described Yudakusuma as "a clever but much dreaded woman", and she led an attack on Ngawi's Chinese community in September 1825. These activities led to the construction of fortifications around Semarang and Madiun, although most were still constructed within Diponegoro's area of operations.

=== Rebel collapse ===
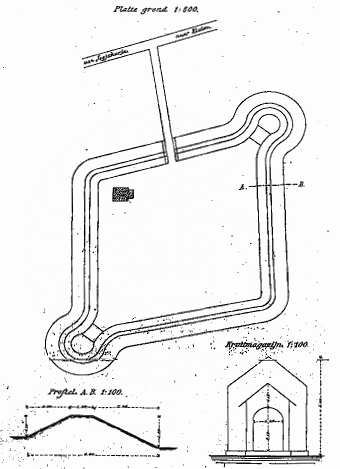
Layout of a Dutch fort in Randu Gunting, constructed in 1825

Dutch command expanded its fortification strategy, known as the Benteng-stelsel ("fortress system"), in 1828 and 1829. Indonesian military historian Saleh Djamhari tabulated the construction dates of 258 forts during the war, of which 133 were constructed in 1828–1829. These were especially concentrated in the vicinity of Yogyakarta and the Bagelen area. The rebels were confined during this period into a killing area between the Progo and Bogowonto rivers. Dutch forces also began employing more repressive tactics during this period to sap Diponegoro's support base. In November 1828, key rebel commander Kyai Maja was ambushed, and surrendered to the Dutch.

The war took a slower pace in early 1829 as Dutch forces reorganized and prepared for a finishing blow, with a three-month ceasefire between the parties in January–April 1829. During this time, Diponegoro's commander Sentot became engaged in disputes with civilian administrators, which further weakened the rebel war effort. Popular support for Diponegoro in his area of operations had declined significantly, due to hardships caused by the war. In some cases, local villagers outright attacked Diponegoro's officials. The rebel leadership also faced food shortages and were running out of money to pay their troops.

The Dutch offensive was launched in June 1829. Diponegoro was defeated in several encounters within a space of two months, though not captured, and lost a number of strongpoints. By September 1829, Diponegoro and Sentot had been forced into a smaller area in the Progo Valley, with just 300 soldiers. Dutch command discovered their position, and they were decisively defeated at the village of Siluk on 17 September. During the battle, many of Diponegoro's commanders were killed in action, and the remnants of the rebels split in two with one group led by Diponegoro and another by Sentot.

=== Conclusion ===
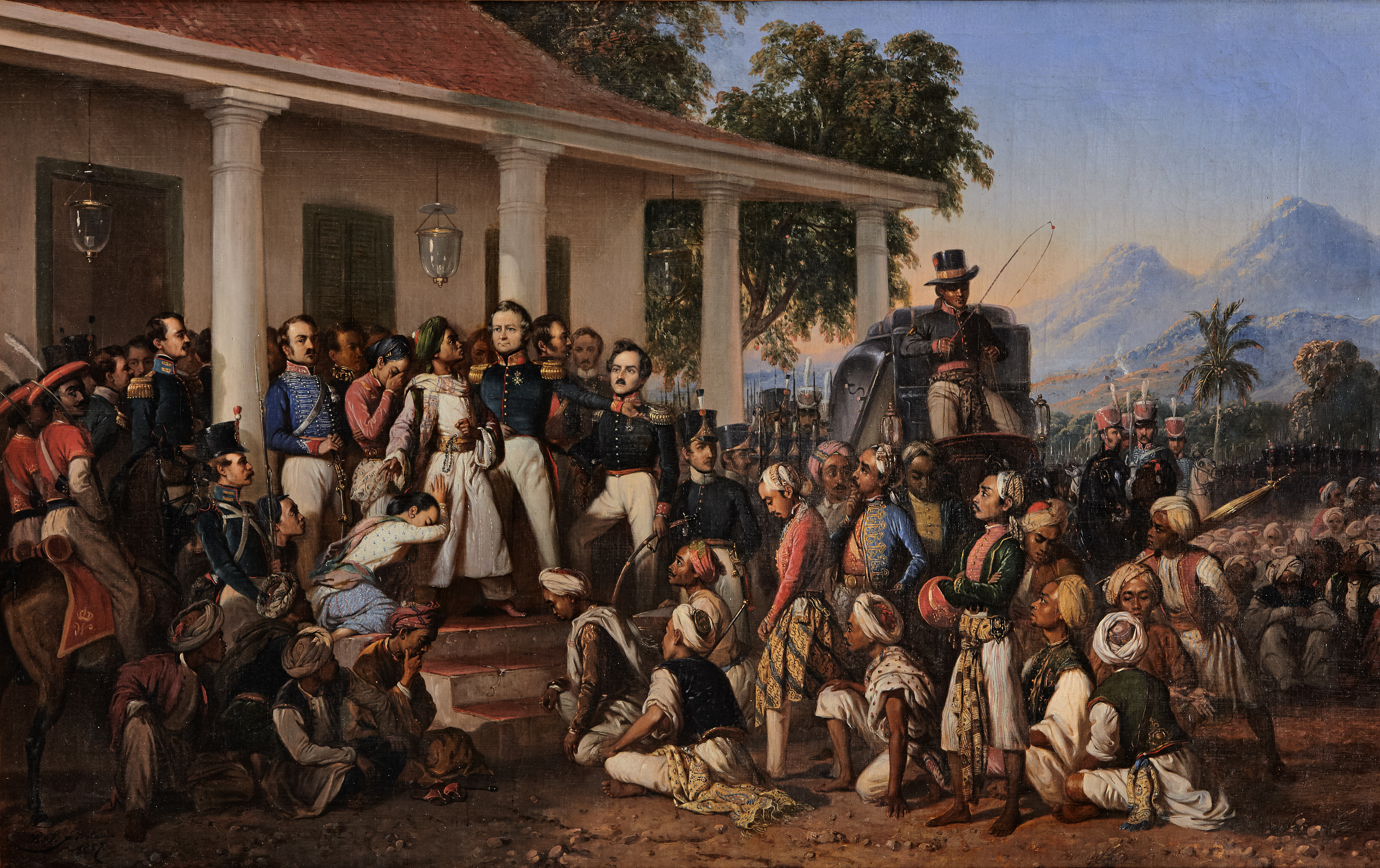
The Arrest of Pangeran Diponegoro, 1857 painting by Raden Saleh

Following his defeat in Siluk, coupled with the death of Prince Jayakusuma shortly after, Diponegoro's situation became untenable. Most of his commanders had been killed, captured, or surrendered, with Sentot surrendering in October 1829. His other remaining commanders gave up the fight, leaving Diponegoro with around fifty men as his personal escorts. The new governor-general Johannes van den Bosch received explicit instructions from Dutch King William I that Diponegoro was to be killed or captured, and no agreement was to be entered. De Kock, on the other hand, was much more open to negotiations, and he managed to lobby Van den Bosch to grant Diponegoro safe conduct.

In 1830 negotiations were started. Diponegoro demanded to have a free state under a sultan and wanted to become the Muslim leader (caliph) for the whole of Java. After a successful early meeting in February with the Dutch local commander, Diponegoro journeyed to Magelang in order to meet personally with de Kock. After several informal meetings between the two, Diponegoro gave de Kock a visit at the Dutch Resident's house on 28 March. During this visit, de Kock announced Diponegoro's arrest, and Dutch soldiers surrounded the house. Diponegoro's 100 or so escort troops were away on morning exercises at the time of the arrest, and were disarmed peacefully. Diponegoro was taken away that day to Semarang to be exiled, ending the war.

== Aftermath ==
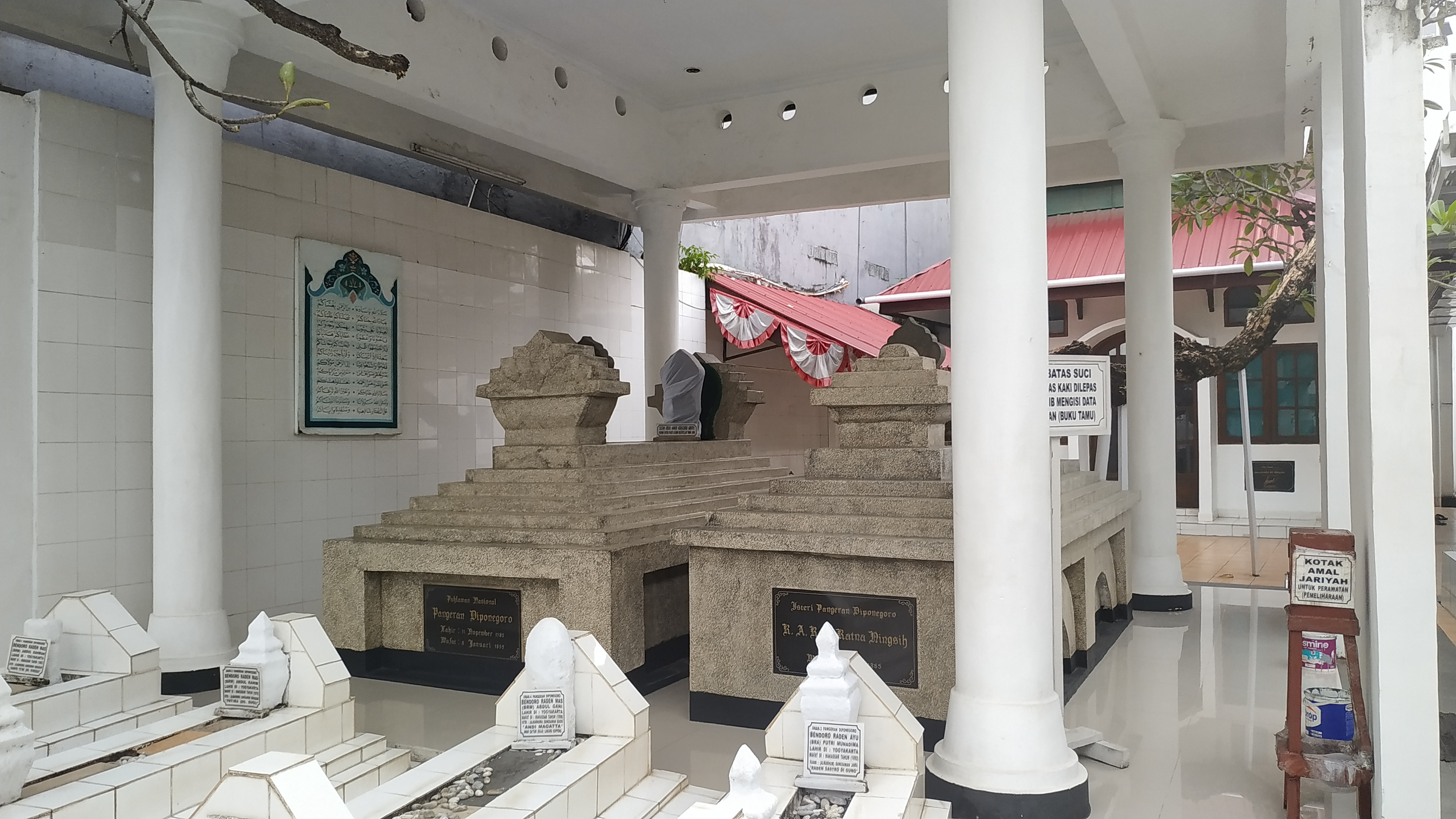
Grave of Diponegoro and his wife in Makassar

Diponegoro was exiled to Manado with a number of followers, as colonial authorities saw that keeping him in Java posed an unacceptable risk. He was moved to the more fortified Makassar in 1833 due to concerns of a British attack on Manado in the event of a European conflict – the Dutch feared that Diponegoro with British support might lead another revolt in Java. Diponegoro would be restricted to Fort Rotterdam starting in 1849, and he died on 8 January 1855. Sentot was given command of a Javanese unit and took part in the Padri War, but was then exiled to Bengkulu in 1833.

The war had caused severe damage to Java, especially in modern Central Java and East Java, along with parts of the north coast outside of those provinces. At least 200,000 Javanese were killed, with the number of combat deaths believed to be 20,000 or less. Between 1825 and 1831, colonial authorities in affected regions reported a population decline in Mataram, Yogyakarta, and Gunung Kidul areas from just over 400 thousand to under 200 thousand. One-third of Java's population of 6 million were directly affected by the war, and around one-quarter of arable land in Java were damaged.

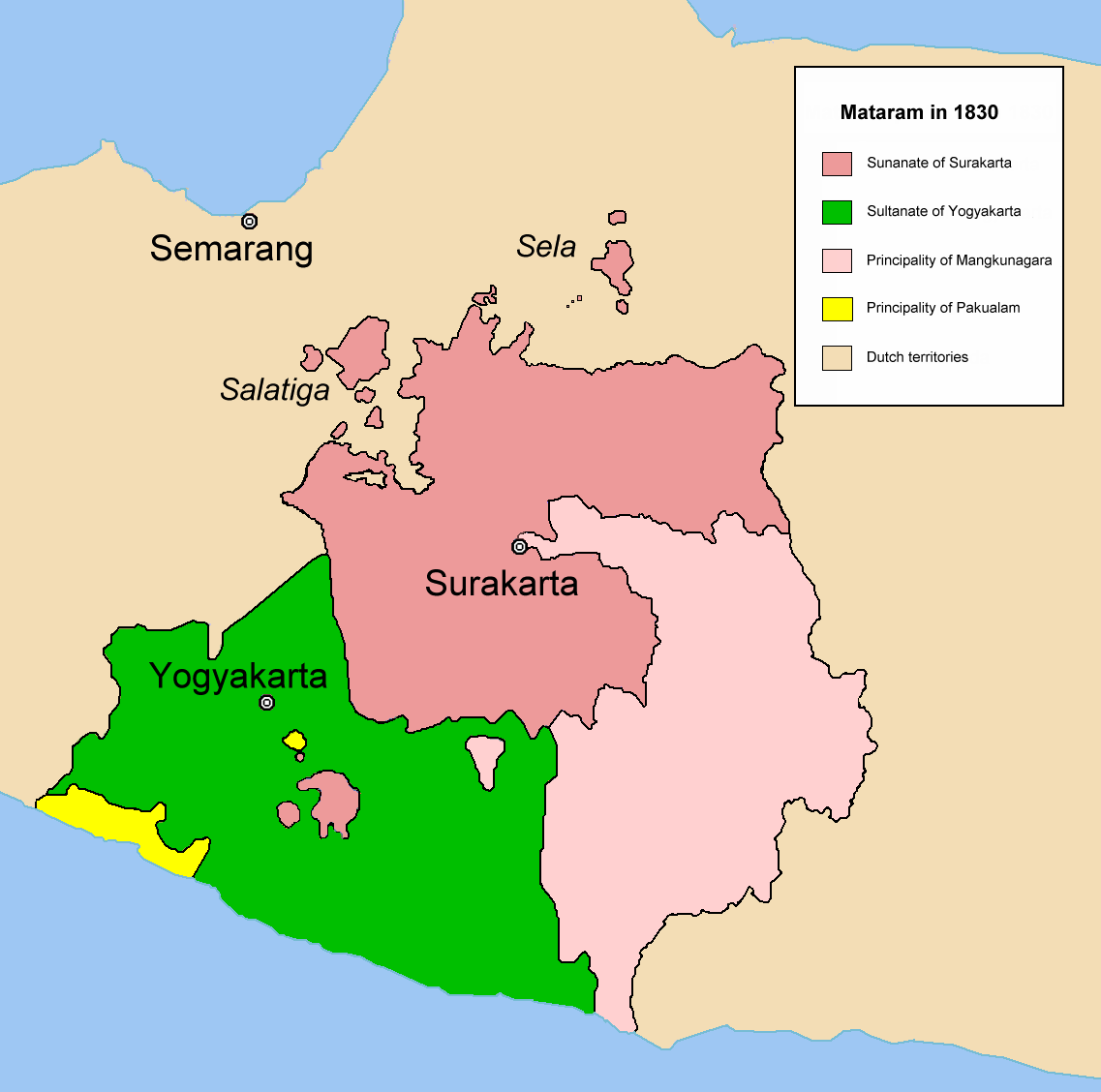
Remaining territories of the princely states after the war, 1830

The Dutch annexed significant proportions of the princely states' remaining territories – namely outlying areas known as mancanagara – shortly after the war, leaving the Yogyakarta Sultanate with the modern boundary of the Yogyakarta Special Region (with a small amount of territory within the region held by the Pakualaman). The Sunan of Surakarta, Pakubuwono VI, was deposed by the Dutch and exiled to Ambon in 1830 due to Dutch suspicions of him working with Diponegoro. Diponegoro's descendants were barred from entering Yogyakarta's keraton until 1950, when the sultanate under Hamengkubuwono IX reconciled with the descendants. The rump princely states no longer posed a threat to the Dutch, which now had full control of Javanese lands. No further significant military threats to Dutch rule to Java would happen until the Second World War and the ensuing Indonesian National Revolution in the 1940s.

To the Dutch, the war had cost 15,000 military dead – 8,000 Dutch and 7,000 native Indonesian recruits. Most Dutch military fatalities were due to tropical diseases exacerbated by poor hygiene in field hospitals, while native Indonesian fatalities were mostly combat related. Out of a 3,154-strong expeditionary force sent from the Netherlands during the war, two-thirds had died by 1830. The financial cost of the war was estimated at 20 to 25 million guilders. (Note: For comparison, the Dutch GNI was around 430 million guilders before the war.) This financial cost, coupled with the Belgian Revolution which broke out shortly after the war's end, heavily strained the Dutch government finances. The costs would be recouped following the introduction of the Cultivation System by new Governor-General Johannes van den Bosch in 1830, which generated immense profits for the Dutch through a coerced labor system. Revenues from the Cultivation System to the Dutch treasury was estimated at over 800 million guilders until its abolition in the 1870s.

Heavy casualties and costs to the Dutch colonial army resulted in changes of how the colonial government approached colonial wars, especially outside Java and Sumatra. In order to avoid guerilla warfare and attrition, Dutch forces adopted a shock and awe approach with coastal bombardments and large-scale landings, intended to break any intent to resist from local populations and rulers. Manpower shortages and increased doubts on the loyalty of native troops after the war led to the recruitment of Africans into the Dutch colonial army, known in Indonesia as Belanda Hitam ("Black Dutch").

== Legacy ==
=== Depictions and historiography ===
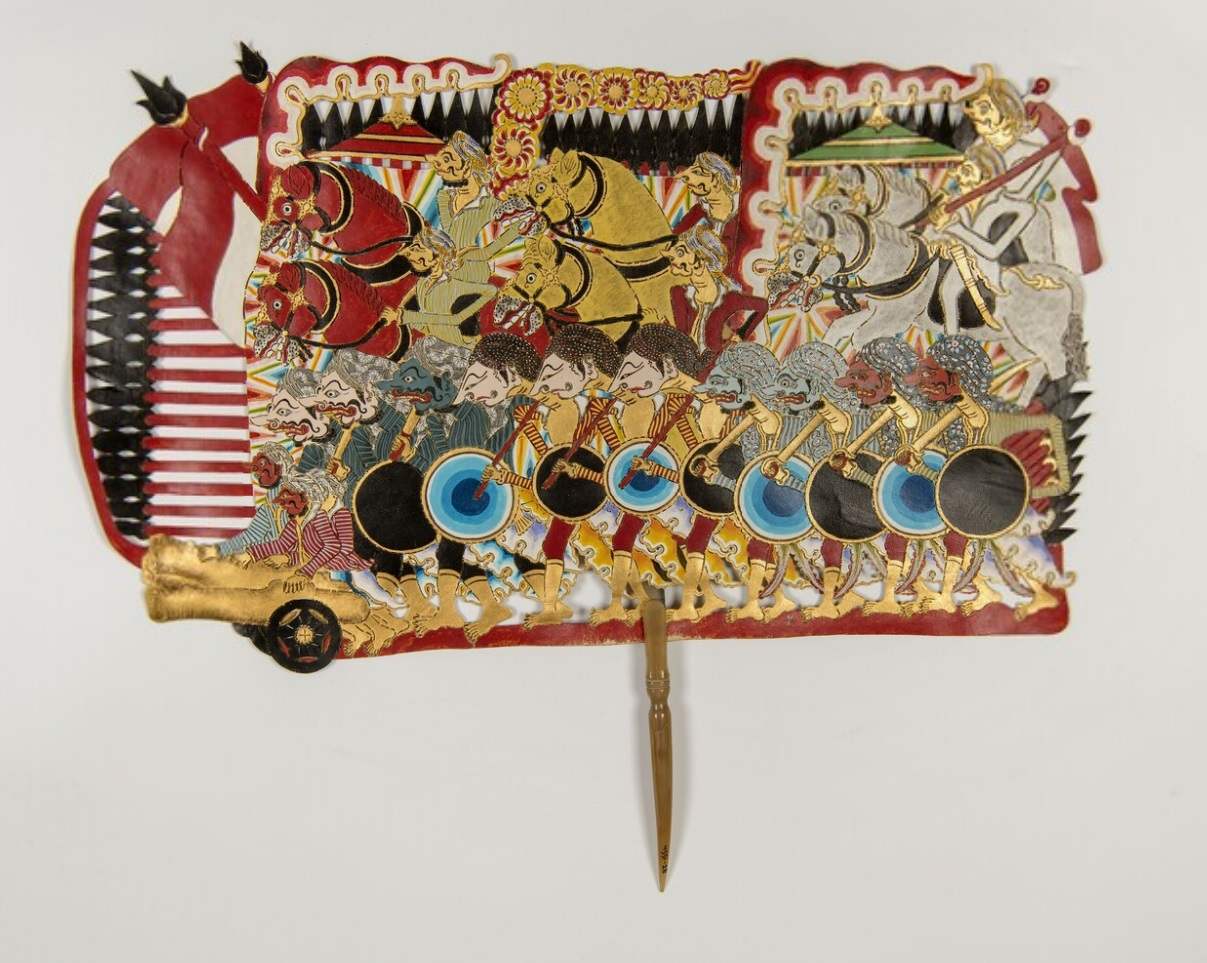
Wayang of Javanese soldiers from the period

The war has inspired a number of artistic depictions, especially in Indonesia. Just the capture of Diponegoro at the end of the war inspired two nineteenth-century paintings: The Submission of Prince Dipo Negoro to General De Kock by Dutch painter Nicolaas Pieneman, and The Arrest of Pangeran Diponegoro by Javanese painter Raden Saleh. 20th-century Indonesian painters who had depicted the war include Basuki Abdullah, Sindoedarsono Soedjojono, and Hendra Gunawan. The 1979 Indonesian movie November 1828 by Teguh Karya depicted the war, and became at the time the most expensive Indonesian movie ever made, while also becoming "a classic and iconic nationalist text".

During his exile, Diponegoro wrote the Babad Diponegoro, a manuscript of over 1,000 pages styled as poetry. A wayang (shadow puppet) show directly narrates the war based on the Babad. It has also been used as a primary source by Dutch and Indonesian authors writing histories of the war. Another Javanese account of the war, the Babad Kedung Kebo, was written in the early 1840s by Surakartan noble Cokronegoro I, who had fought on the Dutch side during the conflict. The definitive Dutch historical account of the war was published in six volumes between 1894 and 1909, while the best-known English-language writing on the war was written by British historian Peter Carey.

=== Chinese Indonesians ===
The war had a long-term influence on the relationship between the Chinese community in Java and the Javanese people. In addition to Dutch colonists, the Chinese minority in Java was also targeted by Diponegoro's forces. For example, the Chinese residents of Ngawi and Bengawan Solo's riverbanks were massacred in September 1825. The Diponegoro troops despised the Dutch and the Chinese as foreign 'infidels' who had come to pillage Java. On the other hand, Chinese and mixed communities in the North Coast of Java, mostly converts to Islam, fought as part of Sasradilaga's army in 1827–1828. Chinese merchants were also suppliers of arms and money to Diponegoro's forces. Diponegoro accepted Chinese recruits to his army, though he expected them to convert to Islam – involving circumcision, saying the shahada, and cutting their queue pigtails.

=== Indonesian nationalism ===
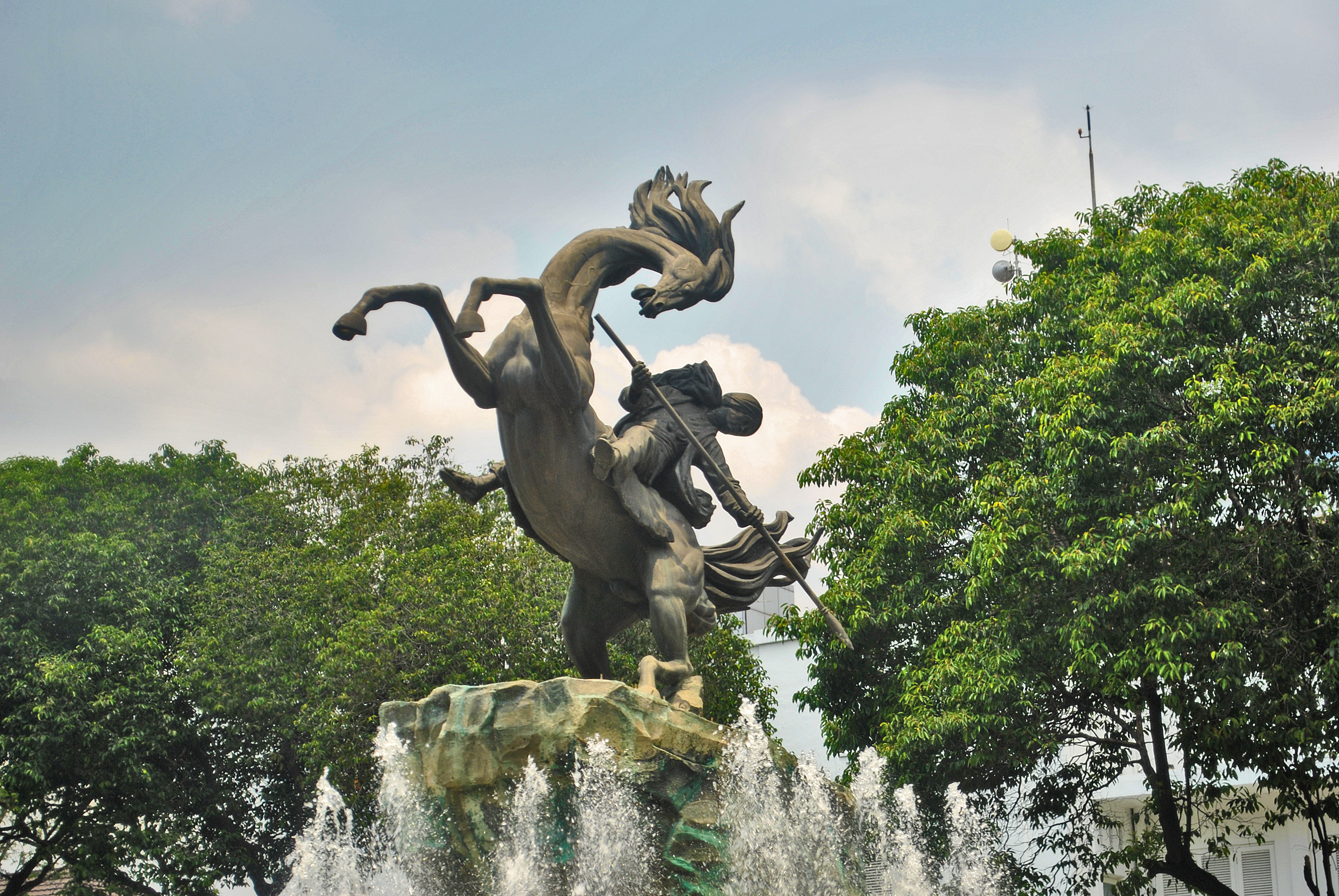
Diponegoro Monument in Jakarta

The war, and Diponegoro, has been attributed as the origin of Indonesian nationalism. During the Indonesian National Awakening, imagery of Diponegoro and the Java War was used by Indonesian nationalists as an unifying factor of resistance against colonial rule, in favor of the more sectarian Islamic angle. Various non-government institutions – ranging from the Islamist Masyumi Party to the now-banned Indonesian Communist Party – use Diponegoro as an icon or claim inspiration from his rebellion. In modern Indonesian historical narratives, the war is seen as a turning point in Dutch colonial power with Diponegoro being seen as one of the nation's first independence fighters.

Diponegoro was declared a National Hero of Indonesia in 1973. Prior to the official designation, many Indonesian leaders had publicly referred to Diponegoro as a national hero, especially during the Indonesian National Revolution. A number of Indonesian institutions are named after Diponegoro – such as an Indonesian Army military district and a state-funded university – along with street names in most Indonesian cities.

== Bibliography ==
- Carey, Peter B. R. (1976). "The origins of the Java War (1825–30)". The English Historical Review. XCI (CCCLVIII): 52–78. doi:10.1093/ehr/XCI.CCCLVIII.52.
- Carey, Peter B. R. (2015). The Power of Prophecy: Prince Dipanagara and the End of an Old Order in Java, 1785-1855. BRILL. ISBN 978-90-6718-303-1.
- Carey, Peter B. R. (2017). Sisi Lain Diponegoro: Babad Kedung Kebo dan Historiografi Perang Jawa (in Indonesian). Kepustakaan Populer Gramedia. ISBN 978-602-424-681-5.
- De Klerck, Eduard Servaas; Louw, Johan Frederik (1894–1905). De Java-oorlog Van 1825-30 [The Java War of 1825-30] (in Dutch). Batavia Landsdrukkerij.

- Louw, Pieter Johan Frederik; Klerck, Eduard Servaas de (1894), Volume I
- Louw, Pieter Johan Frederik (1897), Volume II
- Volume III, Batavia Landsdrukkerij, 1904
- Volume IV, 1905

- Djamhari, Saleh A. (2002). Stelsel benteng dalam pemberontakan Diponegoro 1827-1830: suatu kajian sejarah perang (Thesis) (in Indonesian). University of Indonesia.
- Groen, Petra (2012). "Colonial warfare and military ethics in the Netherlands East Indies, 1816–1941". Journal of Genocide Research. 14 (3–4): 277–296. doi:10.1080/14623528.2012.719365.
- van der Kroef, Justus M. (1949). "Prince Diponegoro: Progenitor of Indonesian Nationalism". The Far Eastern Quarterly. 8 (4): 424–450. doi:10.2307/2049542. ISSN 0363-6917. JSTOR 2049542.
