= Franciscus Bernardus Waanders =

Dutch lithographer and engraver (1809–1880)

- Born: Frans Bernard Waanders; 26 May 1809; Amsterdam, Kingdom of Holland
- Died: 29 December 1880 (aged 71); The Hague, Netherlands
- Known for: Portrait painting; engraving; lithography

Frans Bernard Waanders (Latinized as Franciscus Bernardus Waanders; 26 May 1809 – 29 December 1880) was a Dutch painter, lithographer, engraver, and etcher who worked in The Hague from 1841. Much of his surviving output consists of portraiture prints and lithographs of works by other artists.

== Life and career ==
Waanders was born in Amsterdam on 26 May 1809, then part of the Kingdom of Holland ruled by Napoleon's brother, Louis Bonaparte. In 1815, he and his elder brother Diederik Gerard Waanders moved to Antwerp. He followed his brother and attended he Royal Academy of Fine Arts in Antwerp, where he studied engraving under J. C. Meulemeester. Both brothers won first prize in engraving at the academy, with Diederik winning in 1827 and Frans the following year.

He briefly focused on producing devotional prints in 1829. His dated early work includes two portraits of the Dutch general David Hendrik Chassé, including an etching from 1830 and a lithograph from 1833 printed and published in Dordrecht by Steuerwald & Co. After 1841, he is recorded as having worked in The Hague.

In the 1840s, Waanders made lithographs after designs by a range of painters. A print dating to 1840 reproduced a famous self-portrait of Leonardo da Vinci. Around the same time, he published a print showing Albrecht Beiling parting from his wife and child before being buried alive in 1425, reproducing a composition by Gustave Wappers for the Nederlandsche Maatschappij van Schoone Kunsten in The Hague. Around 1844 or 1845, he produced a portrait after a design by Cornelis Kruseman, printed in Dordrecht by Hilmar Johannes Backer. Two years later, he lithographed an interior scene of a family farewell after a painting by Hubertus van Hove, whose inscription refers to a Hague exhibition of that year, as well as a group portrait of Constantijn Huygens and his five children after Adriaen Hanneman. A large number of his lithographs are portraits of notable Dutch military figures.

The periodical Astrea carried an item titled "Frans Waanders. Vaderlandsche lithographie" ("Frans Waanders. Native lithography") in 1851. Examples of his prints are held by the Rijksmuseum, the Teylers Museum, and the Wellcome Collection in London.

Waanders died in The Hague on 29 December 1880.

== Selected works ==
De Prins van Oranje tijdens de slag bij Quatre Bras, lithograph after Jan Willem Pieneman (1840)

Christ, John the Baptist, and Two Putti, lithograph after Peter Paul Rubens, (c. 1840–1843)

Love Declaration, lithograph by Ferdinand de Braekeleer the Elder (c. 1842–1860)

Portrait of Johannes van den Bosch (1850)

Portrait of a Man (1859)

Portrait of a Woman (1861)
