= Saleh Djamhari =

Indonesian Military Historian

Saleh As'ad Djamhari
- Djamhari in 2014
- Born: 12 March 1938; Malang, Dutch East Indies
- Died: 26 May 2017 (aged 79) Jakarta, Indonesia
- Branch: Indonesian Army
- Service years: 1967–1997
- Rank: Colonel

Saleh As'ad Djamhari (12 March 1938 – 26 May 2017) was an Indonesian military historian and army officer. He served for thirty years in the Indonesian Army as a military historian, reaching the rank of colonel, and later became a lecturer of history at the University of Indonesia.

== Early life ==
Saleh As'ad Djamhari was born in Malang on 12 March 1938. His father, Djamhari, was a Nahdlatul Ulama member who was recruited into the Defenders of the Homeland militia, and fought in the Indonesian National Revolution as a company commander. After Indonesian independence, Djamhari graduated from high school in Malang and studied literature at Gadjah Mada University, receiving a bachelor's degree in 1962.

== Career ==
He continued his studies at the University of Indonesia (UI), where he graduated with a master's of literature in 1965. At that time of his graduation, he was working in UI's history and anthropology department as a staffer. According to Djamhari in a 2014 interview, his inspiration to work as a historian came from his graduation ceremony in 1965, which Sukarno presided over. Djamhari stated that he noticed Untung Syamsuri, who three days later would launch a coup attempt, standing next to Sukarno, and Djamhari became inspired to work in military history after the coup.

In 1967, Djamhari enlisted in the Indonesian Army due to an invitation by military academic Nugroho Notosusanto. Djamhari had been Notosusanto's assistant. He took a course in military history within the army in 1974, and eventually reached the rank of colonel. His time in the army ended in 1997, after which he resumed his studies at UI, receiving a doctorate in 2002. His dissertation focused on the Java War, in particular the Dutch bentengstelsel plan during the war, and was later published as a book in 2004.

He later became a lecturer of history at UI, along with giving special lectures in other universities. He died on 26 May 2017 at Mayapada Hospital, South Jakarta, and was buried at the Tanah Kusir Cemetery.

== Personal life ==
Djamhari married Tutie Artica, who also served in the military and reached the colonel rank, in 1967.
