= Ziegler family =

Bourgeois family of Zürich

Ziegler was a bourgeois family of Zürich, among the most influential families of the city, which died out in the male line in 1924.

== History ==
In 1419 Heinrich Im Werd, a baker from Bremgarten, acquired the city's right of burghership, and by 1445 he was already a member of the Small Council. Kleinhans (1462–1555), probably his grandson, ran a tile works (Ziegelei) in Zürich, from which the family took the name Ziegler. Kleinhans's brothers Heinrich and Rudolf made the pilgrimage to Jerusalem, where they were made knights of the Holy Sepulchre. All the Zürich Zieglers descend from Kleinhans's youngest son, Watmann Itelhans (1500–1579).

Itelhans's son Adrian (1546–1622) was the ancestor of the family's two known branches, the Pelican branch and the Sax branch. In the 1590s he was a cloth merchant and made fustian, after which the Zieglers temporarily gave up the cloth trade. Adrian's grandson Christoph (1628–1708), a physician, took up the business again and ran it with his son Jakob Christoph, builder of the Zum Pelikan house. The Zieglers produced cheap schappe silk and held a dominant position in that sector. Another grandson of Adrian, Hans Jakob, was a physician of the city of Zürich.

To the Pelican branch also belonged Jakob Christoph, a colonel and member of the Small Council, and his son Paul Karl Eduard, a colonel and member of the National Council, as well as Leonhard, a bookseller. The Sax branch was founded by another son of Adrian, also named Adrian, an apothecary and bailiff of Sax-Forstegg from 1626 to 1631.

It died out in the course of the 19th century, having produced three further bailiffs of Sax-Forstegg and four captains of that bailiwick. The Zieglers were among the most influential families of Zürich, with thirty-eight members of the Grand Council and eighteen of the Small Council in all. From the mid-16th century they held two or more seats in the noble society of the Schildner zum Schneggen. The family died out in the male line in 1924.

== Bibliography ==
- E. Eidenbenz, Stammbaum der Familie Ziegler nach C. Escher-Ziegler, n.d. (StAZH)
- Almanach généalogique suisse, 1, 688–690
- C. Escher, "Die Zürcherfamilie Ziegler", in ZTb 1919, 1918, 77–134
- A. Corrodi-Sulzer, Der Pelikan (in Zürich und die Familie Ziegler), 1675–1931, 1932
