= Jakob Christoph Ziegler =

Topics referred to by the same term

Jakob Christoph Ziegler may refer to:

- Jakob Christoph Ziegler (silk manufacturer) (1647–1718), Swiss silk manufacturer in Zürich
- Jakob Christoph Ziegler (general) (1768–1859), Swiss military officer and politician
- Jakob Christoph Ziegler (colonial official) (1791–1825), Swiss colonial official in Sumatra and mercenary
