= Jakob Christoph Ziegler (colonial official) =

Swiss colonial official and mercenary (1791–1825)

- Born: 17 January 1791; Zürich, Switzerland
- Died: 21 August 1825 (aged 34); Muntok, Sumatra
- Occupations: Colonial official, mercenary

Jakob Christoph Ziegler (17 January 1791 – 21 August 1825) was a Swiss colonial official in Sumatra and a mercenary in the service of Holland.

== Biography ==
The second child of the second marriage of Jakob Christoph Ziegler and Regula Peter, Ziegler grew up in Zürich, where his father was a bookbinder and later innkeeper of the Schützenhaus. Throughout his life he remained attached to his mother and to his sisters Cleophea Waser and Emerentiana Wetzel, wife of Johann Jakob Wetzel. Although he came from an important Zürich bourgeois family, his close relatives held no political office. He was a merchant, though the nature of the goods he sold is not known. In 1812 he married Susanna Elisabetha Vogel of Zürich; the couple had two sons, the younger of whom died a few weeks after birth.

Ziegler went bankrupt in 1814 and divorced on 24 August 1815, the Zürich matrimonial court citing the "disloyal abandonment" of his wife and his "notorious dissolute life". A soldier in the Piedmontese army from 1815, perhaps as a result of his failures, he was promoted to adjutant non-commissioned officer, then entered French service as a quartermaster and reached the rank of sergeant. He probably entrusted his son to one of his sisters. Little is known of him in this period, nor why he deserted and entered the service of the Netherlands.

=== Colonial service in Sumatra ===
Ziegler is attested between November 1820 and February 1821 as a sergeant-major aboard a Dutch military vessel sailing from Ostend to Batavia. As a troop instructor in the Dutch colony of the East Indies, he took part in various military operations against local rulers. Under General Hendrik Merkus de Kock, he was assigned as a non-commissioned officer to oversee the market of Palembang on the island of Sumatra after the city's conquest in 1821. He left this post in 1822 to join the Dutch colonial military administration and became secretary to the inspector F. Schulze, of German origin, with whom he formed a friendship. In 1823 he was also secretary to an engineer involved in the reconstruction of the fortress of the sultan of Palembang. His social rise continued within the colonial community: promoted to "second clerk", he owned as a colonial official a house and at least three slaves. He died suddenly of a tropical disease at Muntok on Sumatra shortly before his transfer to the central military administration in Batavia. Schulze sent a letter to Ziegler's family in Switzerland to inform them of his friend's death.

The letters Ziegler sent from 1823 from Palembang to his mother, brother-in-law, and sisters in Zürich express how much he missed his family and give a realistic description of the life of a Swiss man working in the colonies. He recounts his daily life in the Dutch colonial administration, his voyage by ship, the military conquests, local foods, his living conditions in the army, and the organization of the Dutch-dominated colonial society on Sumatra. The letters were sent to Switzerland by a distant relative, Jakob Christoph Ziegler, major general in the service of Holland.

== Bibliography ==
- Escher, Conrad, "Die Zürcherfamilie Ziegler", in Zürcher Taschenbuch auf das Jahr 1918, 39, 1918, pp. 77–134
- Kägi, Kaspar; Kuhn, Konrad J., "Kolonialexpansion, fremde Dienste und Sklaverei. Jakob Christoph Zieglers (1791–1825) Briefe aus Sumatra", in Zürcher Taschenbuch 2010, 130, 2009, pp. 71–141
- Krauer, Philipp, "Zwischen Geld, Gewalt und Rassismus. Neue Perspektiven auf die koloniale Schweizer Söldnermigration nach Südostasien, 1848–1914", in Revue suisse d'histoire, 71/2, 2021, pp. 229–250

=== Archives ===
- Zentralbibliothek Zürich, Zürich, Familienarchiv Ziegler, and Jakob Christoph Ziegler (1791–1825)
