= The Arrest of Pangeran Diponegoro =

1857 painting by Raden Saleh

- Penangkapan Pangeran Diponegoro (Indonesian), Gevangenname van Prins Diponegoro (Dutch)
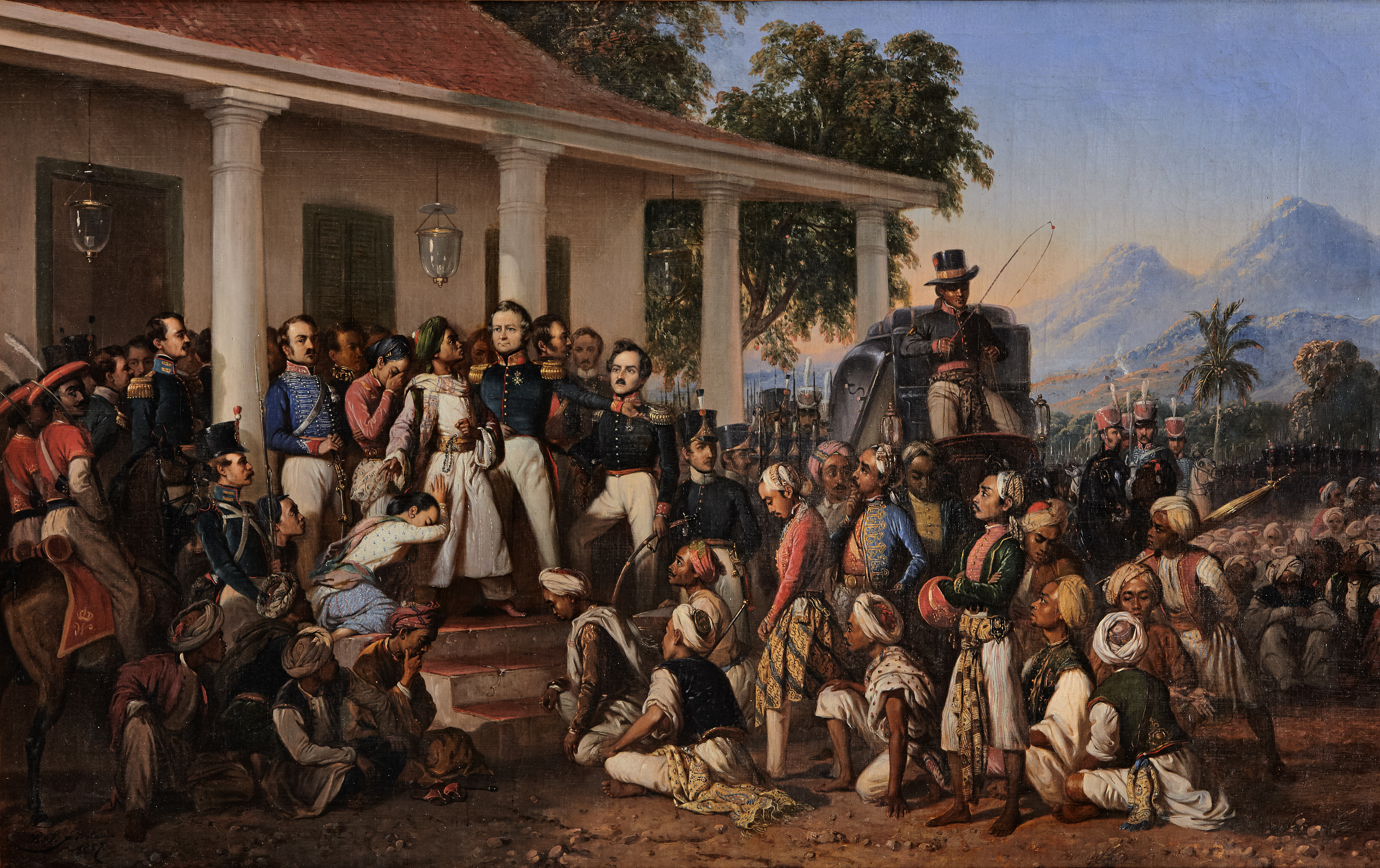
- Artist: Raden Saleh
- Year: 1857
- Dimensions: 112 cm × 178 cm (44 in × 70 in)
- Location: National Gallery of Indonesia, Jakarta, Indonesia

The Arrest of Pangeran Diponegoro (also The Arrest of Prince Diponegoro; Indonesian: Penangkapan Pangeran Diponegoro; Dutch: Gevangenname van Prins Diponegoro) is the name of an 1857 painting by Raden Saleh, depicting the capture of Prince Diponegoro by Lieutenant General Hendrik Merkus de Kock on 28 March 1830.

== Description ==
Prince Diponegoro stands, defiant, in front of Lieutenant General Hendrik Merkus de Kock in front of the colonial officer's mansion. He wears a green turban, white tabard over pantaloons, and a jacket; around his waist is a golden belt, to which prayer beads are attached, and over his shoulder is a shawl. He appears to be struggling to control his anger – as would be expected from Javanese gentry – while the Europeans' eyes are static and avoid the eyes of others.

De Kock, the captor, stands to Diponegoro's left, at the same level as the guerrilla. Further to the left are various Dutch officers, identified by the historian and Diponegoro biographer Peter Carey as Colonel Louis du Perr, Lieutenant-Colonel W.A. Roest, and Major-Adjutant Francois Victor Henri Antoine Ridder de Stuer. To the prince's right stands a Javanese man identified by Carey as Diponegoro's son, Diponegoro the Younger, followed by Resident of Kedu Franciscus Gerardus Valck, Colonel Jan-Baptist Cleerens, and Captain Johan Jacob Roeps. At Diponegoro's feet, a woman – possibly his wife Raden Ayu Rětnaningsih – reaches out to grab him.

The view from the northeast shows a still morning scene, with no wind blowing, and centered around Diponegoro. Saleh gives the painting depth of field, showing the soldiers closest to the front in crisp detail, while blurring the details of those in the back rows. The heads of the Dutchmen depicted appear to be slightly too large for their bodies, while those of the Javanese soldiers are of proper proportions. The painter, Raden Saleh, inserted himself into the painting twice: as a soldier bowing to the captured leader, and as a soldier facing the viewer.

This painting measures 112 by 178 centimetres (44 in × 70 in).

== History ==
=== Background ===
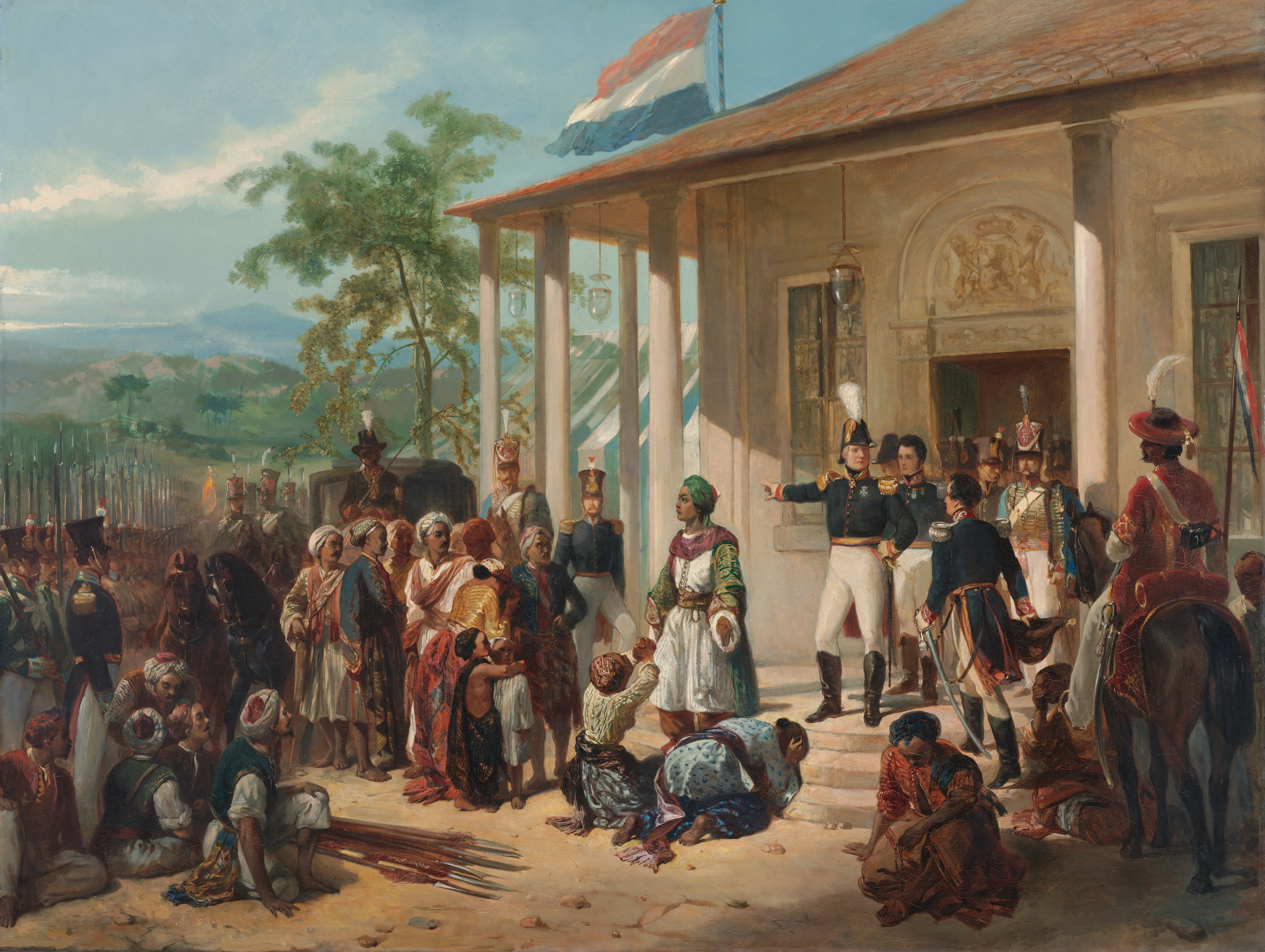
The Submission of Prince Dipo Negoro to General De Kock, Nicolaas Pieneman (c. 1830–35)

Diponegoro (1785–1855), a descendant of the Sultans of Yogyakarta, was passed over several times for ascension to the throne. In 1825, after declaring himself Ratu Adil and his enemies infidels for their lax practice of Islam, he began a war against the reigning sultan and the Dutch colonial government. In the five-year struggle that followed, which was waged over much of central Java, over 200,000 Javanese and 15,000 Dutch soldiers were killed. On 28 March 1830, with most other guerrilla leaders captured, Diponegoro was invited to come to Lieutenant General De Kock's home in Magelang to negotiate an end of hostilities and guaranteed safety of passage. There, after three hours, Diponegoro was arrested. He was exiled to Makassar, Sulawesi, where he remained until his death.

Saleh's depiction is not the only painted version of Diponegoro's capture. An earlier version, The Submission of Prince Dipo Negoro to General De Kock, was completed c. 1835 by Nicolaas Pieneman on commission by De Kock or his family. Rather than an angry and defiant man, Pieneman presented a submissive and beaten Diponegoro, standing lower than his captor and thus symbolically having less power. Overall, Pieneman's painting gives the impression that, although De Kock is acting sternly in exiling Diponegoro, it is in the best interest of the Javanese. The author Susie Protschky describes both Pieneman and Saleh's works as "two of the best-known history paintings from the Indies".

=== Completion ===
Saleh returned to Java in 1851 after a lengthy period studying in Europe, during which he had claimed a familial relationship to the guerrilla and protested his treatment at the hands of the Dutch colonial administration. Diponegoro died in 1855, which art historian Werner Krauss suggests inspired the artist to complete The Arrest of Pangeran Diponegoro and "reformulate" the arrest in Javanese terms, rather than the colonial terms of Pieneman. Although Saleh had never met the prince and had been studying in Europe when Diponegoro was captured, his family had fought for Diponegoro.

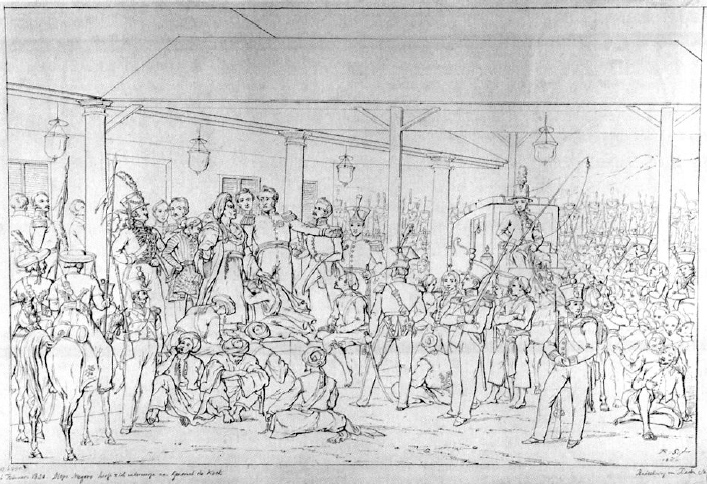
Saleh's sketch for the painting (1856)

Pieneman's painting was already known to Saleh, and he may have known the artist as well. Saleh was also likely inspired by history painters, particularly Louis Gallait; Krauss finds similarities between Gallait's The Abdication of Charles V and Saleh's depiction of Diponegoro's arrest. The artist's use of color is reminiscent of the nature works by Horace Vernet and Eugène Delacroix, both of whom Saleh was familiar with, and De Kock's pose appears to have been influenced by Italian Renaissance paintings.

Work had begun in 1856 when Saleh requested permission to travel to various sites related to the Java War but was denied. A preliminary sketch was completed later that year; Saleh had previously visited a cousin in Magelang, where Diponegoro was arrested and was thus aware of the area and the setting. In his preparations, Saleh made one of his most ambitious projects, with more than forty people in the frame. Krauss stated that The Arrest of Pangeran Diponegoro was both the first South-East Asian painting in the historical painting genre, and the first one by a South-East Asian artist to depict an event from the area.

=== Subsequent history ===
The completed painting was gifted to King William III of the Netherlands. Saleh said that it was a "token of thanks" for the Dutch government paying for his education in Europe for nearly twenty-three years. After several years in the Palace in The Hague, The Arrest of Pangeran Diponegoro was hung in Bronbeek, a home for Royal Colonial Military veterans. Around the early 1970s, The Arrest of Pangeran Diponegoro was given some restoration, including a new coat of varnish. In 1978, the Oranje Nassau Foundation arranged for the work to be sent to the government of Indonesia; this was done under the terms of the Cultural Accord of 1969.

The Arrest of Pangeran Diponegoro was initially held at the Central Museum, along with other artifacts from the Java War, up through the early 1980s. By 2005, the painting was kept in the Istana Negara museum. It was reported to be in poor condition. The edges of the work had become brittle, and the varnish had given the painting a greenish tinge.

Owing to the amount of damage the painting had sustained and its historical value, in 2012 the Goethe-Institut and Ansari Djojohadikusumo Foundation arranged for The Arrest of Pangeran Diponegoro to be restored by conservator Susanne Erhards of the Köln Group. This began with a cleaning shortly before the work was displayed in the National Gallery of Indonesia, followed by an analysis of the composition of the varnish (allowing it to be removed). The work was then given a string lining on the canvas, then reframed. Finally, damage to the paint was touched up with watercolors, and a new layer of varnish was applied.

== Analysis ==
The Arrest of Pangeran Diponegoro has been considered an example of early Southeast Asian nationalism in art. John Clark, in his 1998 book, wrote that the painting declared "you did this to us, but we are still us" to the Dutch. Krauss expands on this, stating that the positioning of De Kock on the left-hand ("female", or "less powerful") side and the over-large heads of the Dutch officers relegates them (to a Javanese viewer) as impotent raksasas; Dutch viewers unfamiliar with such Javanese cultural considerations could have not realized that it was a "bitter comment on Dutch colonial rule". This analysis has been supported by Carey, who describes the gifting of the painting as a "curious backhanded gesture" towards the Dutch king. He considers the morning to indicate that "the memory of Dipanagara – his genius and his suffering – would one day ... redeem the nation from the shackles of colonialism.

The painting has also been used as evidence that Saleh did not have any sense of nationalism. The Indonesian historian Harsja Bachtiar wrote that the gifting of the painting to William III was evidence that there was no struggle, but rather the relationship of a courtier and his king, or of an artist and his patron. The art historian Astri Wright gave a similar reading, stating that Saleh's depiction of the final outcome of the Java War served as a warning for any future rebels, and suggesting that Saleh's painting may have been commissioned by the Dutch colonial government. Protschky likewise questions the presence of resistance to colonial rule, looking to Saleh's paintings of the Governors-General of the Dutch East Indies and seeing them depicted as "uncontested rulers" over the Indies; as such, by presenting the painting to the Dutch king Saleh recognised Dutch rule.

== Reception ==
The painting has been considered one of Saleh's masterpieces. Krauss considers it well-balanced and well-composed. Carey considered the painting more "animated" than Pieneman's, and considers the morning light to lend a "translucent quality" to the "magnificent Javanese scenery". However, the historian H.J. de Graaf found fault with the disproportionate heads in the painting, and took issue with the discrepancies between the gallery depicted in Saleh's painting and the actual interior room where the arrest took place.

== Cultural reference ==
The poet Taufiq Ismail, after viewing the painting in 1995, wrote a short quatrain regarding it:

Original

Aku termangu melihat lukisan itu...
Kau beri adegan abad ke 19 yang begitu tegang...
seorang Pangeran, pangeran, ditangkap dengan khianat
Wahai Raden Saleh Syarif Bustaman, betapa padat dan kaya isyarat lukisan Tuan

Translation

I'm stunned, seeing that painting...
You've given us such a tense 19th-century scene
A Prince, prince, caught through treachery
Oh Raden Saleh Syarif Bustaman, how rich the symbolism in your painting, Sir

In 2001, Yogyakarta-based artist Rudi Winarso created a parody of the painting, which depicted Raden Saleh showing The Arrest of Pangeran Diponegoro to a clearly moved Diponegoro, as the two are being held prisoner by Pieneman, De Kock, and King William III; Winarso stated that the painting was meant to highlight the contrasting points of view presented by Saleh and Pieneman in their depictions of Diponegoro's capture. In 2010, the Indonesian choreographer Sardono W. Kusumo used a large-scale reproduction of the painting as a scrim for the stage opera Taking a Fresh Look at Diponegoro. A stage adaptation, based on the scene, was performed at the National Gallery of Indonesia in June 2012.

The painting was used as the main plot of Stealing Raden Saleh, a 2022 heist action film directed by Angga Dwimas Sasongko. Produced by Visinema Pictures, the film starred Iqbaal Ramadhan, Angga Yunanda, Rachel Amanda, Umay Shahab, Aghniny Haque and Ari Irham.

== Works cited ==
- Carey, Peter (1982). "Raden Saleh, Dipanagara and the Painting of the Capture of Dipanagara at Magělang (28 March 1830)". Journal of the Malaysian Branch of the Royal Asiatic Society. 55 (1): 1–25. ISSN 0126-7353. JSTOR 41492909. (subscription required)
- Carey, Peter (2007). The Power of Prophecy: Prince Dipanagara and the End of an Old Order in Java, 1785-1855. Leiden: KITLV Press. ISBN 978-90-6718-303-1.
- "Diponegoro". MSN Encarta. Archived from the original on 1 November 2009.
- Krauss, Werner (2005). "Raden Saleh's Interpretation of the Arrest of Diponegoro: An Example of Indonesian "proto-nationalist" Modernism". Archipel. 69: 259–94. doi:10.3406/arch.2005.3934.
- Latief, Feri (5 September 2013). "'Menelanjangi' Lukisan Karya Raden Saleh" ['Undressing' a Painting by Raden Saleh]. National Geographic. Archived from the original on 6 October 2014.
- Maharani, Shinta (30 November 2013). "Lukisan Parodi Penangkapan Diponegoro Dipamerkan" [A Parody of The Arrest of Diponegoro is Displayed]. Tempo. Archived from the original on 6 October 2014.
- Protschky, Susie (2011). Images of the Tropics: Environment and Visual Culture in Colonial Indonesia. Verhandelingen van het Koninklijk Instituut voor Taal-, Land- en Volkenkunde. Vol. 270. Leiden: KITLV Press. ISBN 978-1-299-78406-2.
- Rulistia, Novia D. (2 August 2013). "Raden Saleh's masterpieces to undergo restoration". The Jakarta Post. p. 27. Archived from the original on 6 October 2014.
- Taufiqurrahman, M. (25 February 2010). "The journey of sainted Javanese prince Diponegoro". The Jakarta Post. Archived from the original on 6 October 2014.
- "The Arrest of Diepo Negoro by Lieutenant-General Baron De Kock". Rijksmuseum. Archived from the original on 6 October 2014.
- Zakiya, Zika (3 June 2012). "Pertama Kalinya, Karya Besar Pionir itu Untuk Indonesia" [For the First Time, The Masterpiece of that Pioneer is for Indonesia]. National Geographic. Archived from the original on 6 October 2014.
