= Paul Karl Eduard Ziegler =

Swiss officer and politician (1800–1882)

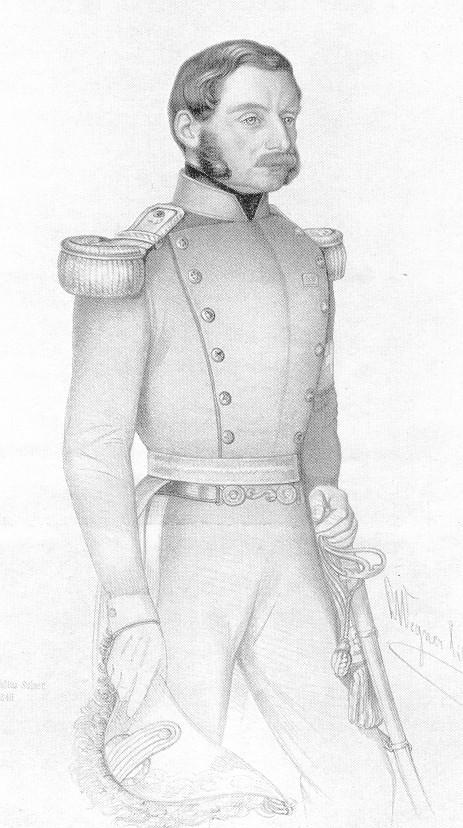
- Portrait of Paul Karl Eduard Ziegler from a lithograph of the National Councillors of 1849–1850
- Born: 11 December 1800; Sterzing, Tyrol
- Died: 21 August 1882 (aged 81); Zürich, Switzerland
- Occupations: Military officer, politician

Paul Karl Eduard Ziegler (11 December 1800 – 21 August 1882) was a Swiss military officer and conservative politician from Zürich. He commanded a division in the Sonderbund War, served on the cantonal government, and sat in the National Council.

== Biography ==
Ziegler was the son of Jakob Christoph Ziegler. In 1834 he married Johanna Louise Bodmer, daughter of Heinrich, a silk manufacturer. He served in his father's regiment in the Netherlands from 1815 to 1829 (first lieutenant in 1817, battalion orderly officer in 1821, and regimental orderly officer with the rank of captain in 1826). After the disbandment of the Swiss troops in 1830, Ziegler returned to Zürich, where he was appointed first lieutenant and commander of the fourth elite battalion that same year; he resigned in 1832.

A conservative member of the city council (1831–1840) and president of Zürich (1837–1840), Ziegler was a deputy in the Grand Council of Zürich (1832–1868). During the Strauss affair of 1839, as commander of the troops, he preserved the city of Zürich from major damage through his measured action and then formed a provisional cantonal government when the government fled. On the cantonal executive (1840–1866), he alternately headed the military and police departments. He was appointed colonel of infantry in 1844.

During the Sonderbund War in 1847, Ziegler commanded the 4th division and became known as the "victor of Gisikon". He served as division commander and chief of staff during the occupation of the frontiers in 1856 and 1859, and sat in the National Council (1848–1855, 1860–1866).

== Bibliography ==
- A. Bürkli, Oberst Paul Karl Eduard Ziegler (1800–1882), 1886
- C. Aversano, Oberst Eduard Ziegler, 1800–1882, 1951
- Gruner, L'Assemblée fédérale suisse, 1, 130
- S. G. Schmid, Die Zürcher Kantonsregierung seit 1803, 2003, 341

=== Archives ===
- Zentralbibliothek Zürich, Zürich
