= Louis Meijer =

Dutch painter

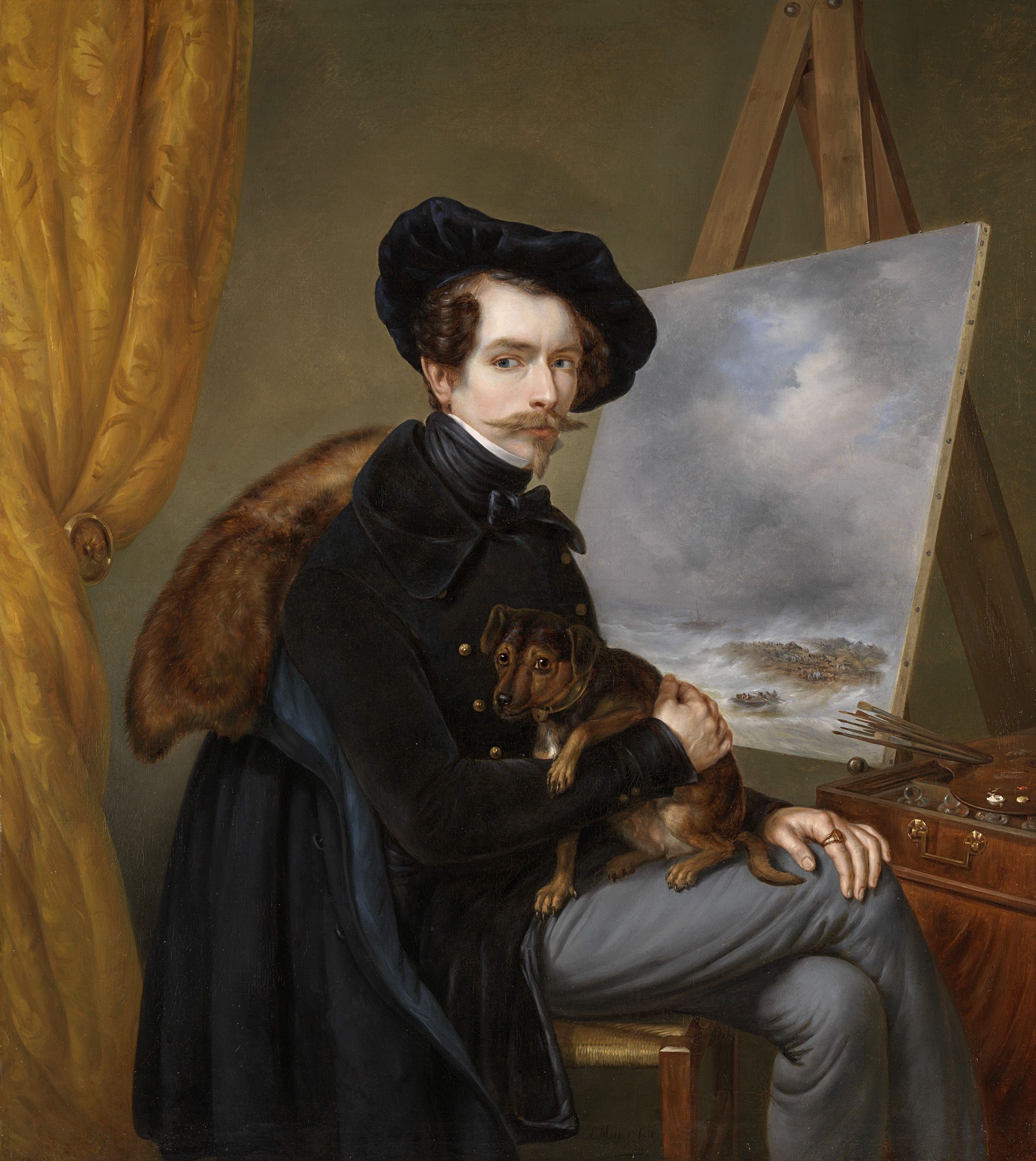
- Self-portrait, 1838
- Born: Johan Hendrik Louis Meijer; 9 March 1809; Amsterdam, Kingdom of Holland
- Died: 31 March 1866 (aged 57); Utrecht, Netherlands
- Known for: Painting

Johan Hendrik Louis Meijer (9 March 1809 – 31 March 1866) was a Dutch painter, etcher, lithographer, and draftsman. He painted in the Romantic tradition and is best known for his seascapes.

Meijer was born in 1809 in Amsterdam in the Kingdom of Holland, present-day Netherlands. He studied under George Pieter Westenberg and Jan Willem Pieneman, and lived in Deventer, from 1841 in Paris and then in The Hague. Matthijs Maris was a pupil of Meijer's, beginning in 1854. Meijer died at the age of 57, in Utrecht in the Netherlands.

Meijer received his first training in painting from Westenberg and then continued his studies under JW Pieneman . He went through all the classes at the Royal Academy of Art in Amsterdam, obtained a medal in two classes as well as the silver one from Felix Meritis for painting after the dressed model. In 1827 he left for France where he practiced landscape painting. In 1831 he returned to Holland and settled in Deventer in 1835, where he stayed until 1839. It was there that he first occupied himself with the profession of sea painting following the shipwreck of the ZM steamship onde Lucipara, with the happy result that he devoted himself entirely to it. It was natural that the Dutch beaches and the harbors along the Northern and Mediterranean seas were the grounds where he gathered for the excellent works of art which decorated exhibitions and cabinets. After his marriage to Josette Maria van der Stok, daughter of Mrs. Burgkley Glimmer 's first marriage, in Maastricht (1841), he settled in Paris. In the following year he was already seen at the exhibition Visschers on the coast of Normandy and the Fire of the ship India . He received a gold medal for the first painting, the latter purchased by the Museum in Puy de Dôme. In the same year he also obtained the great silver medal at the exhibition in Angers, and in 1844 the gold medal 2 o class for his painting Napoleon disembarked at Frejus., purchased for the museum at Versailles, and the silver medal at Boulogue sur Mer. In 1845 at the Toulouse exhibition he obtained the Diplôme d'Eloge and in Brussels for his sea on the English coast, and Visscherspinken in the high seas, the gold medal. In 1855 the jury of the world exhibition in Paris awarded him the great gold medal, in 1861 he received its medal from the Société des Arts in Lyon in recognition of the magnificence which his paintings had received at the last exhibition held by the society. . In 1858 at the exhibition in Arti et Amicitiae te About the entire work TITLES Biographical dictionary of the Netherlands

https://www.ensie.nl/blauwe-scheen/meijer-johan-hendrik-louis-louis

About this chapter/article AUTHORS about John HL Meyer

[p. 797] Amsterdam some fishermen from his brush at the rising sun on the Flemish coast . Kramm lists the following of his principal paintings, which were to be used for a fixed purpose: Le Chien de terre neuve, purchased by King Louis Philips . Combat d'Alacrity, under Admiral Mackau, as above. Shipwrecked survivors rescued by whalers, purchased by King William II. Escader in the Middle. sea, under the command of HRH Prince Hendrik . As above. A Storm on the French Coast, Purchased by the Russian Emperor Nicholas . A storm in the canal on Prince Hendrik's last voyage, posted to Stockholm. Scheveningen, in stormy weather, in the possession of Princess Marianne . Sending Out a Lifeboat and A Storm on the Isle of Jersey, owned by Colonel Bohlen . The storm at sea calmed by JESUS, in the possession of Mr. A. Belmont, at New York. Views on the coast at Biarritz, in the possession of the king of Wurtenberg. The shipwreck of His Majesty's steamship Willem I, on the Lucipara, rests on the pavilion in Haarlem . If the fame that Meijer acquired through his excellent products was great, no less was the honor that may be due to him. In 1847 he became knight of the Legion of Honor and of the Netherlands Lion, in 1851 knight of the Swedish Order of the Polar Star, in 1855 of the Leopold Order, in 1856 Commander of the Order of the Eikekroon. He was also a member of the Imperial Academy in Petersburg, a corresponding member of the Kon. Ned. Institute and member of the Kon. Academy of Fine Arts in Amsterdam. Since 1848 he settled in The Hague, which city he left only at the end of his life and temporarily to make many journeys in France, England and Paris, the Spanish coast, and a stay of several months in Russia. In May 1865 he took his residence to Utrecht, disposed of his studies, sketches, and all that he possessed of art, and died there on April 3, 1866.

Work in public collections:

https://www.boijmans.nl/en/collection/artworks/3524/seascape

Rijksmuseum

nl:Museum Jan Cunen

nl:Dordrechts Museum

https://www.mutualart.com/Artist/Johan-Hendrik-Louis-Meijer/397B6A76801D65C0/Artworks

https://www.mutualart.com/Artist/Johan-Hendrik-Louis-Meijer/397B6A76801D65C0/AuctionResults

== Gallery ==
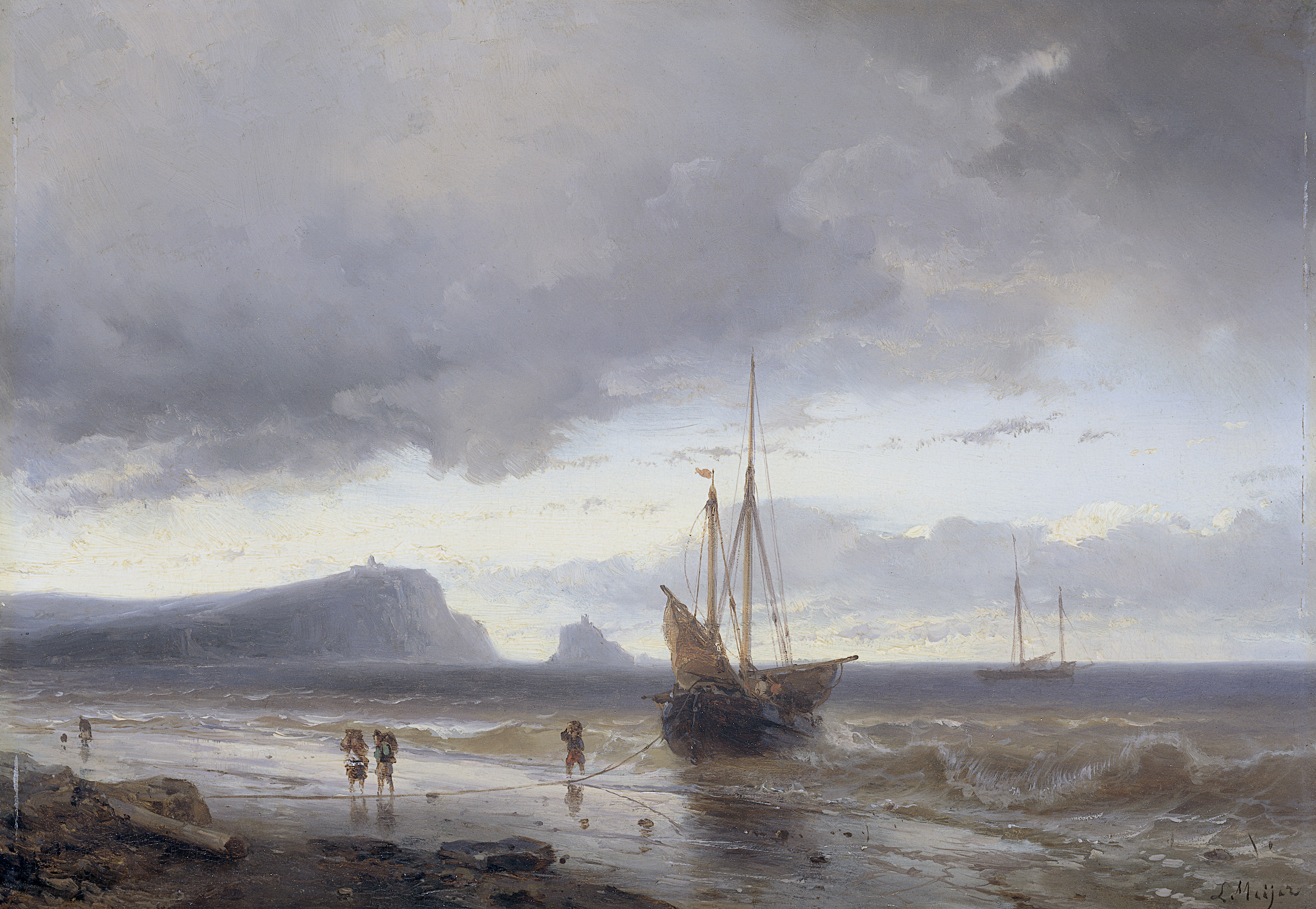
On the coast

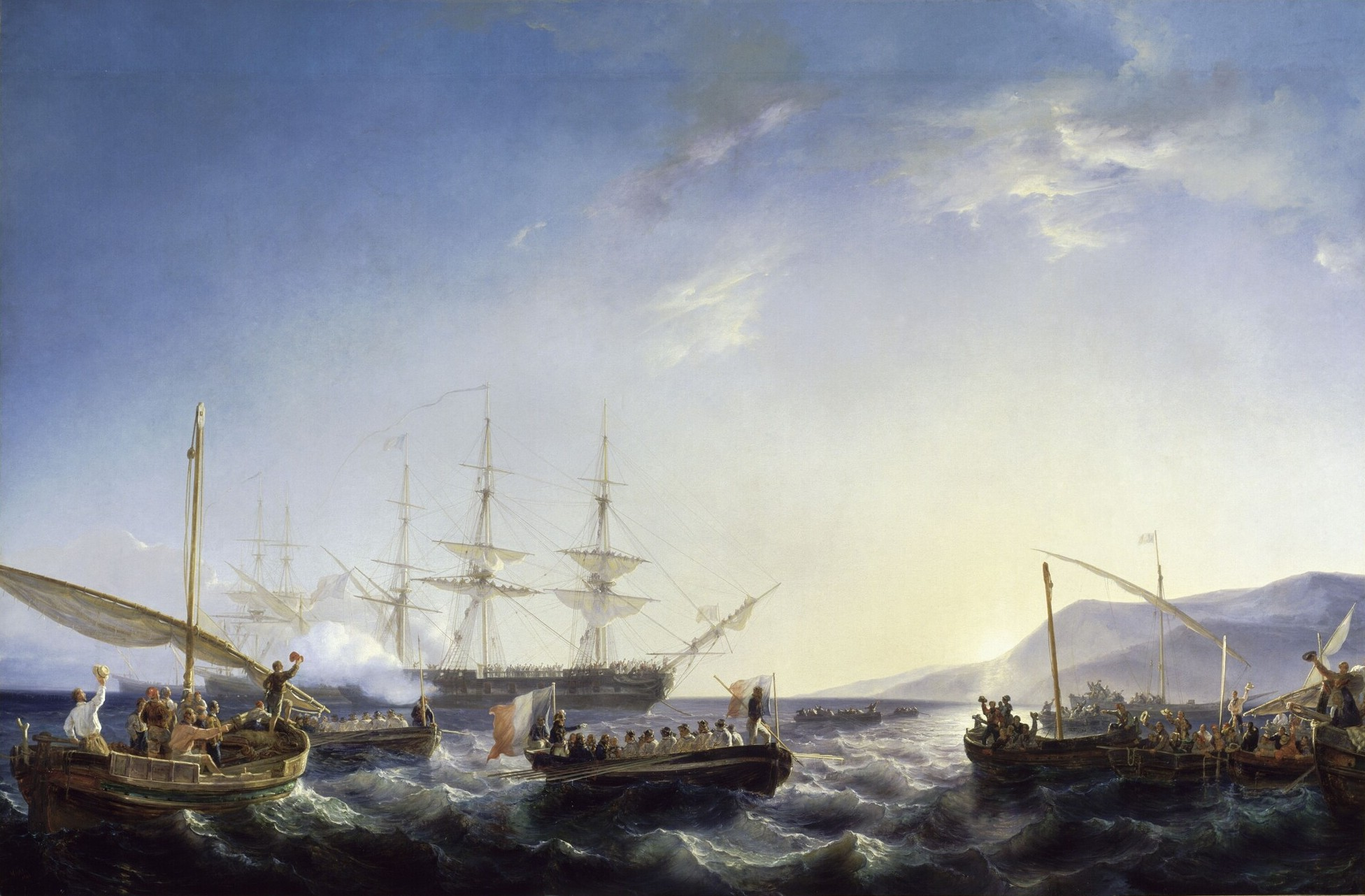
Arrival in France of Bonaparte on the return from Egypt on 9 October 1799

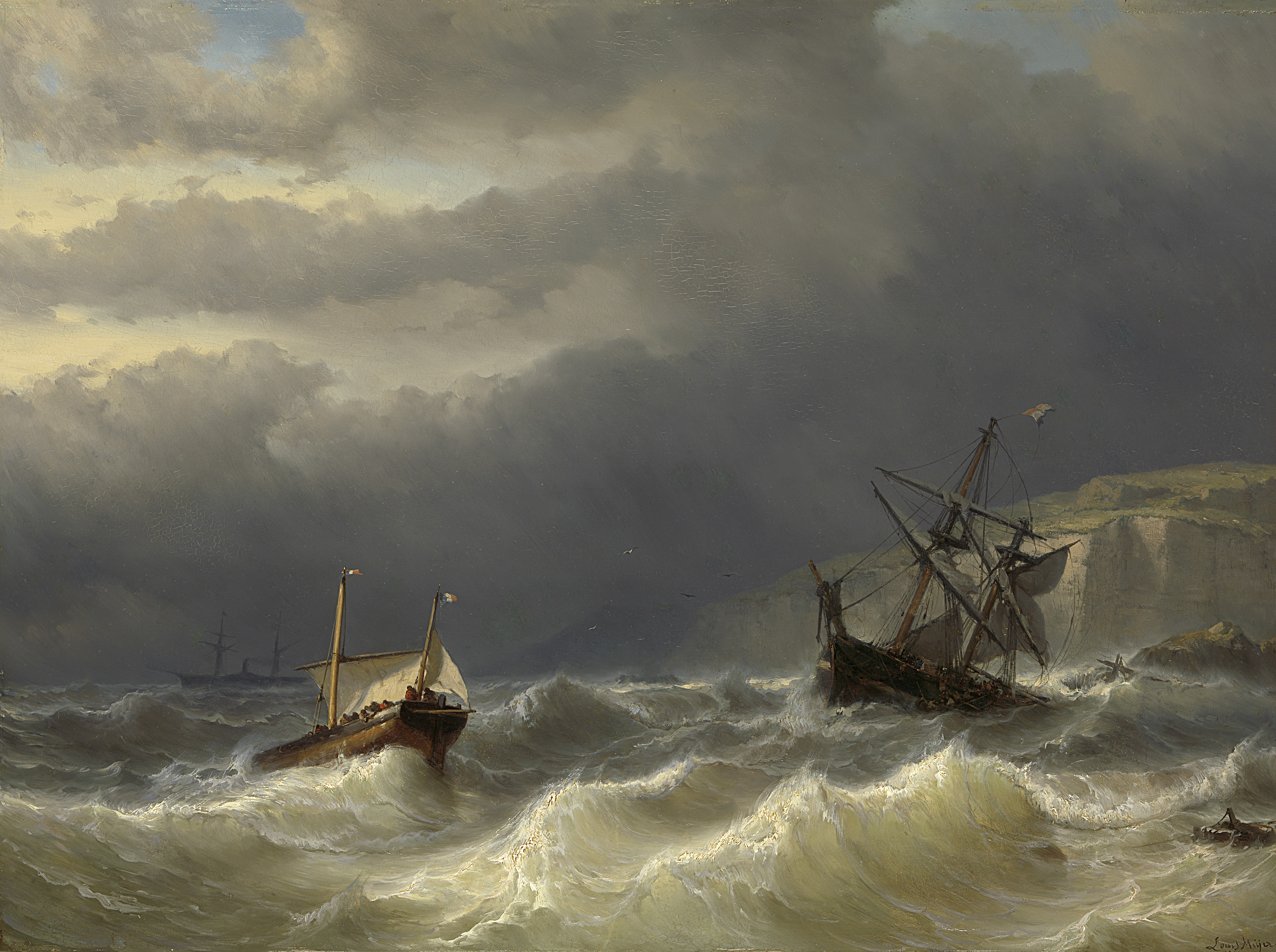
Storm in the Strait of Dover

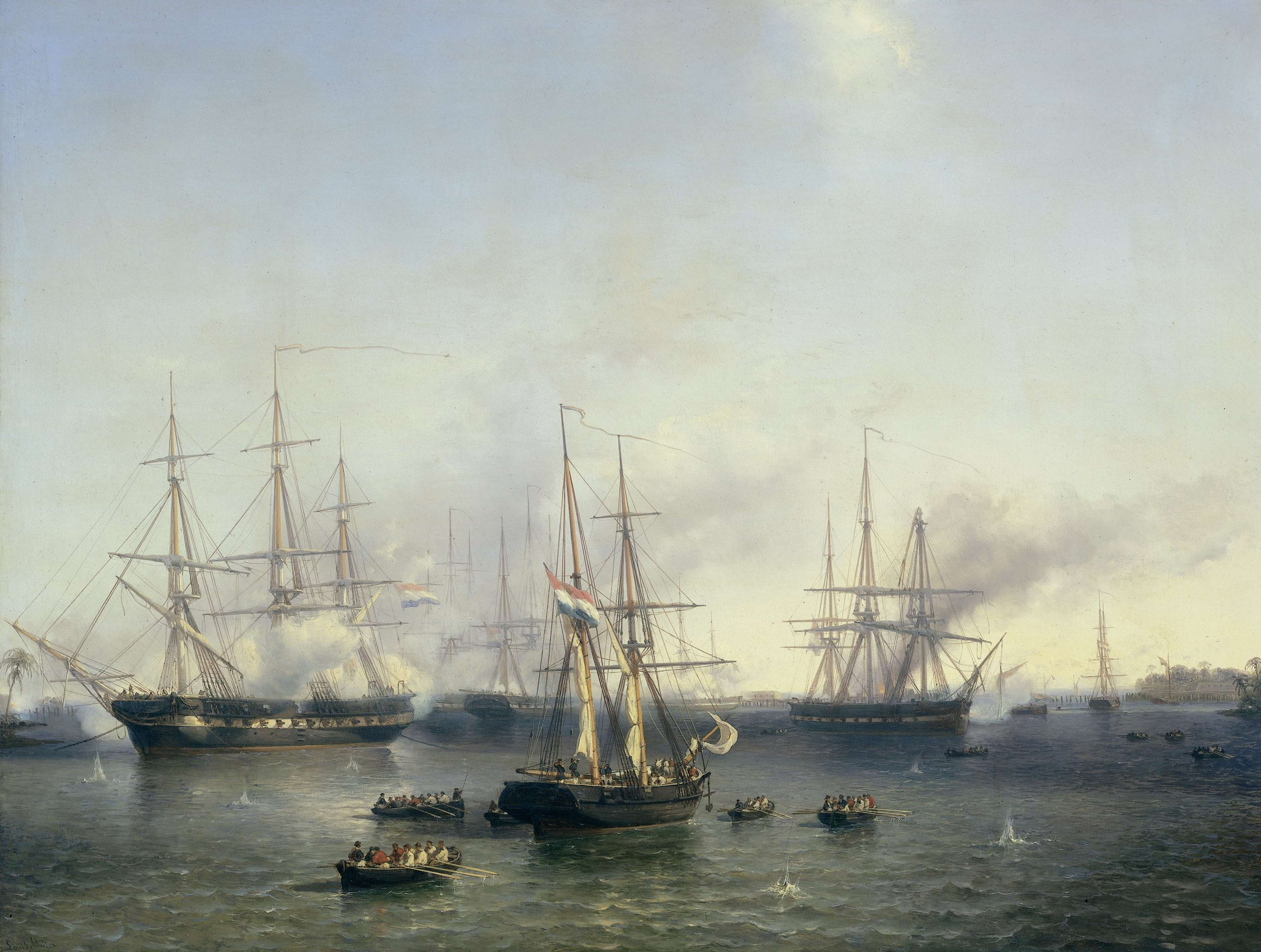
Baron Hendrik Merkus de Kock's fleet conquering Palembang, Sumatra, on 24 June 1821

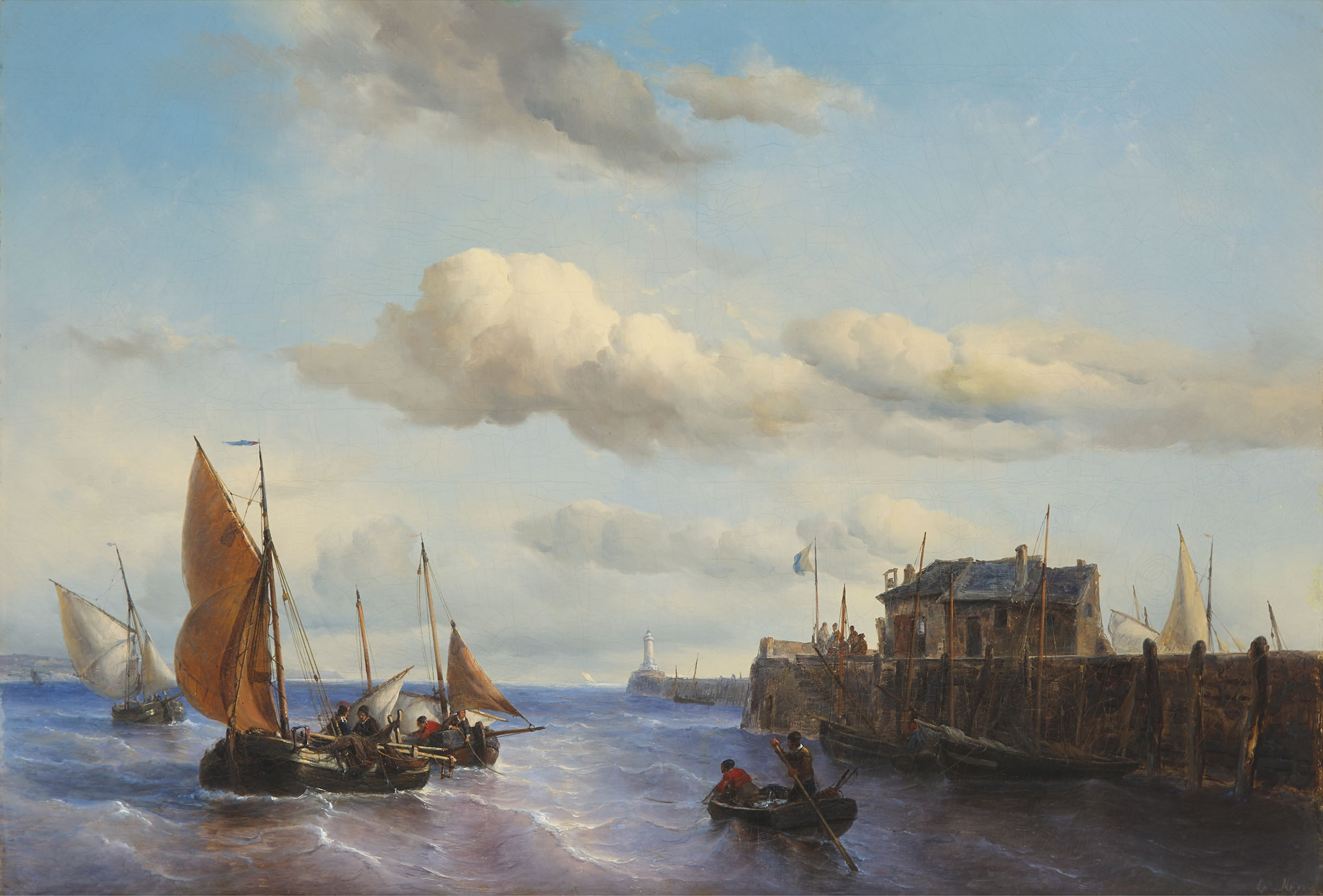
Louis Johan Hendrik Meijer (1842) - Meijer, Louis, catalogue number 226, Gezigt op den Vuurtoren te Dieppe

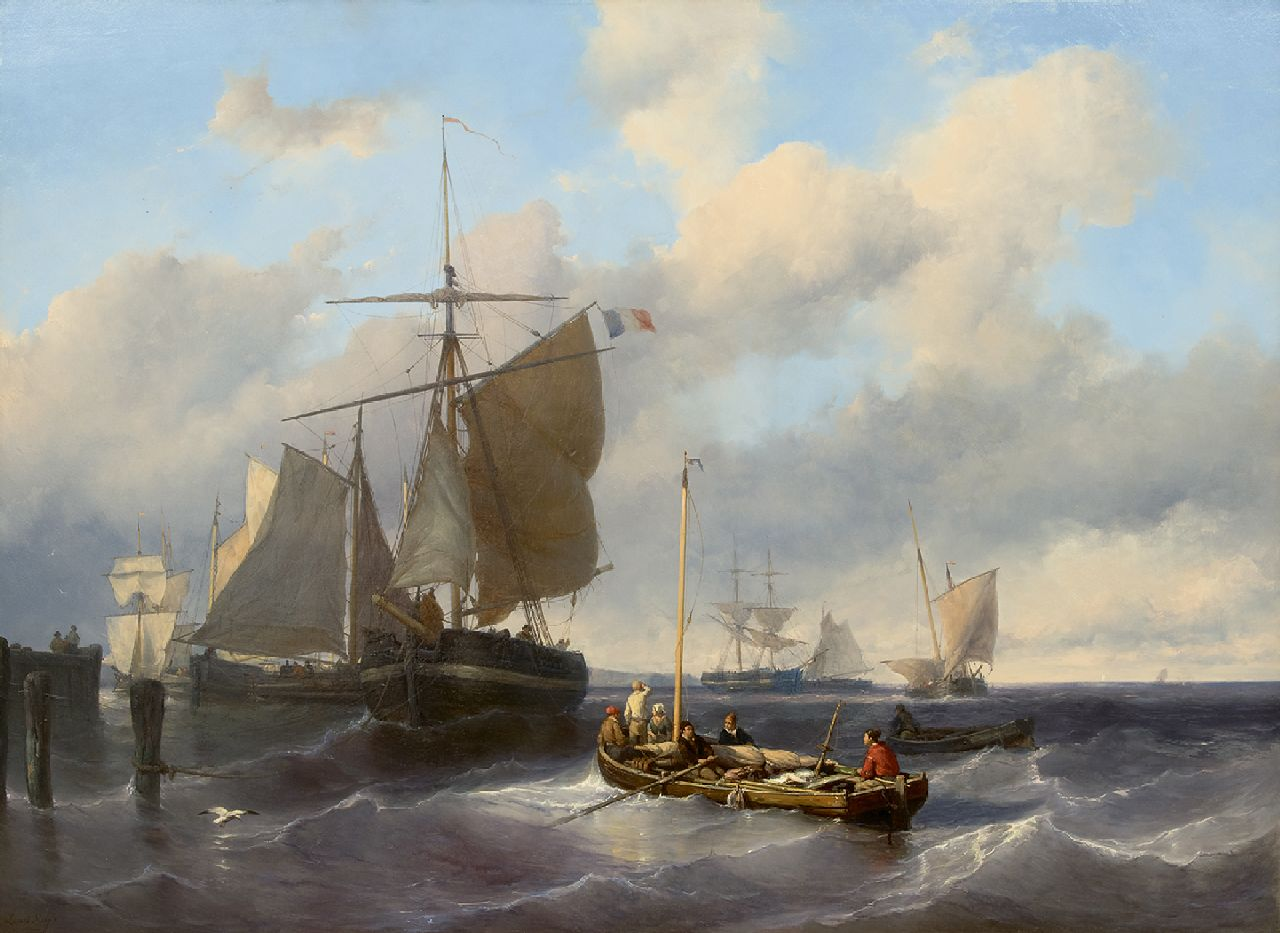
Louis Meijer Hoisting the sails at pier

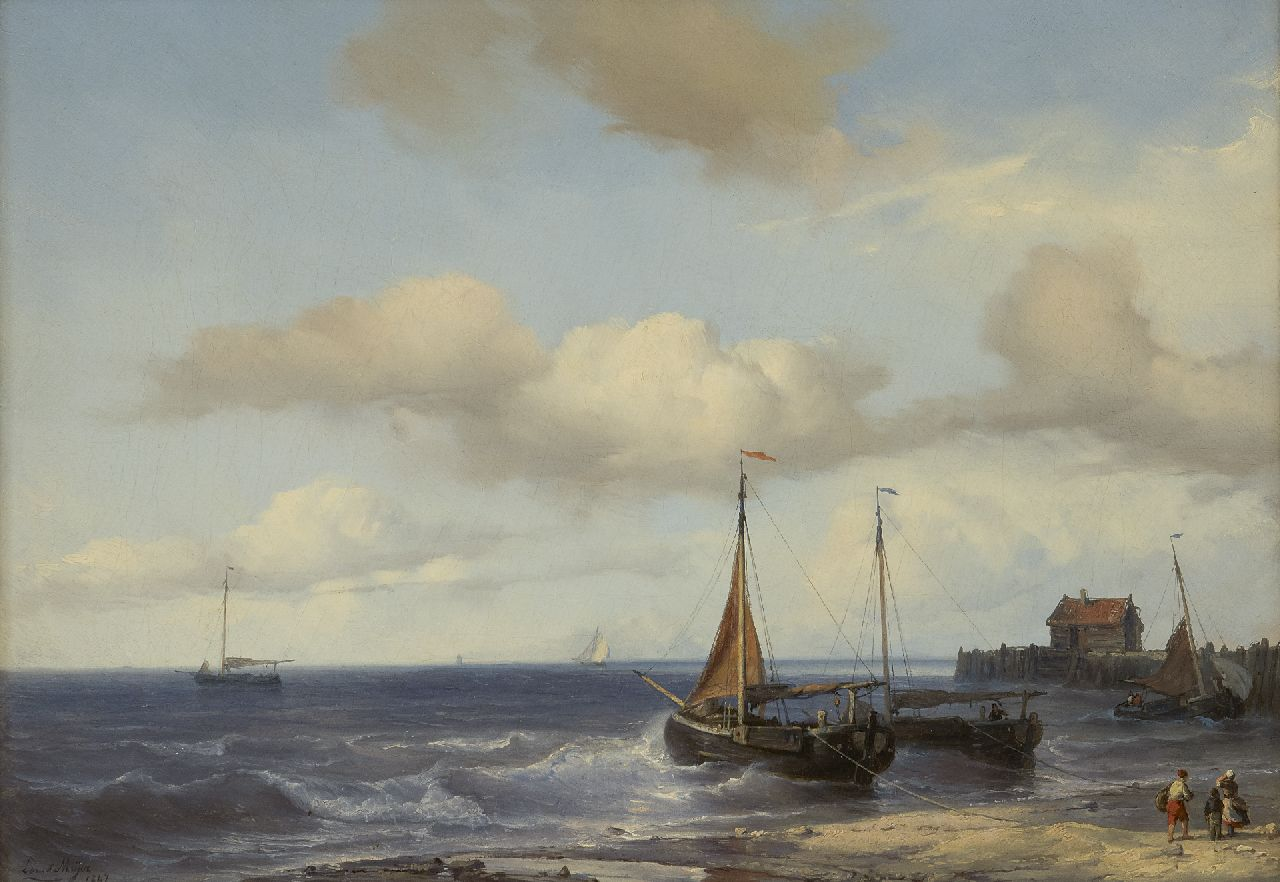
Louis Meijer Fishing ships in the breakers 1847

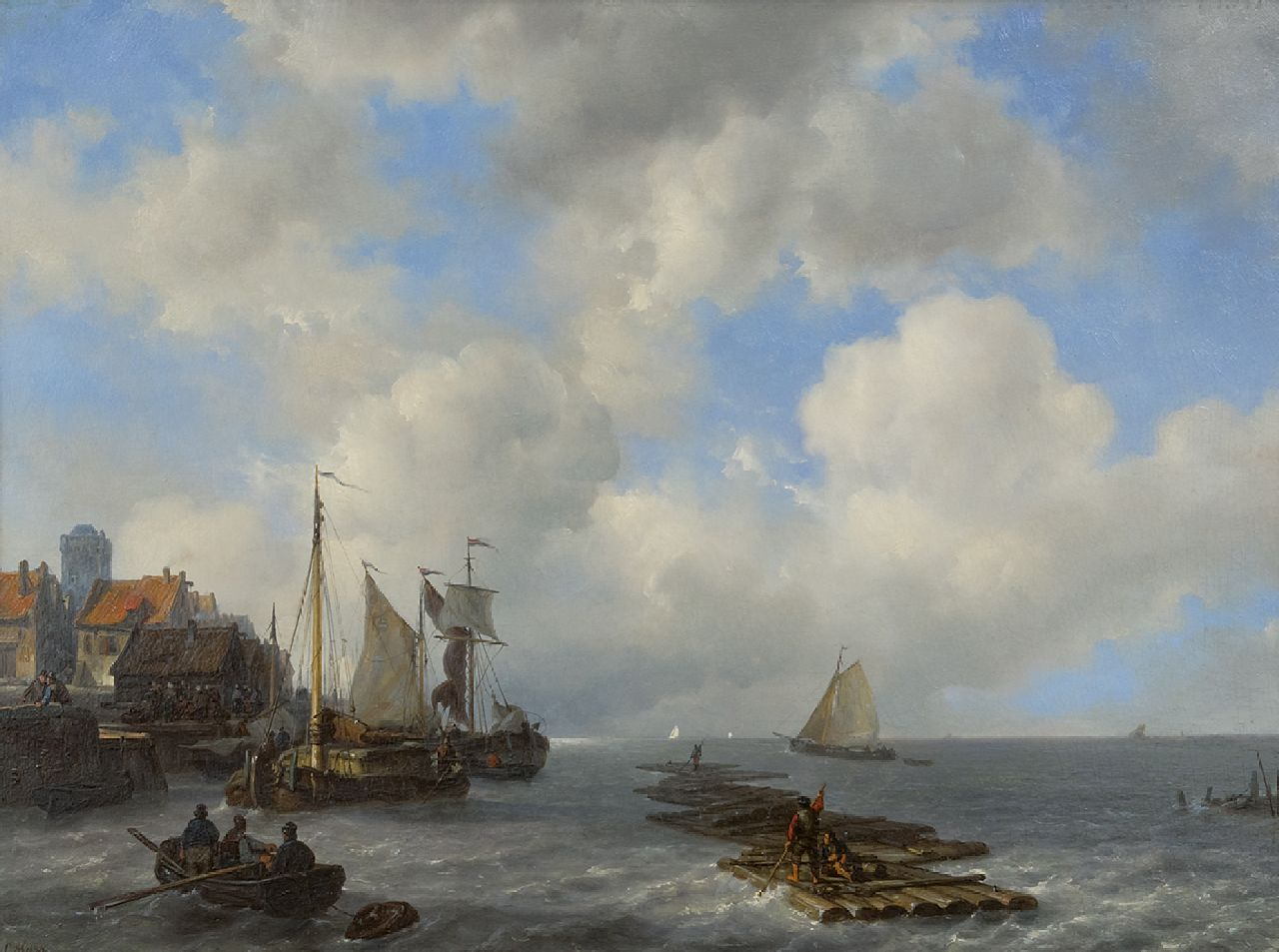
Louis Meijer Moored sailing vessels by a quay 1841

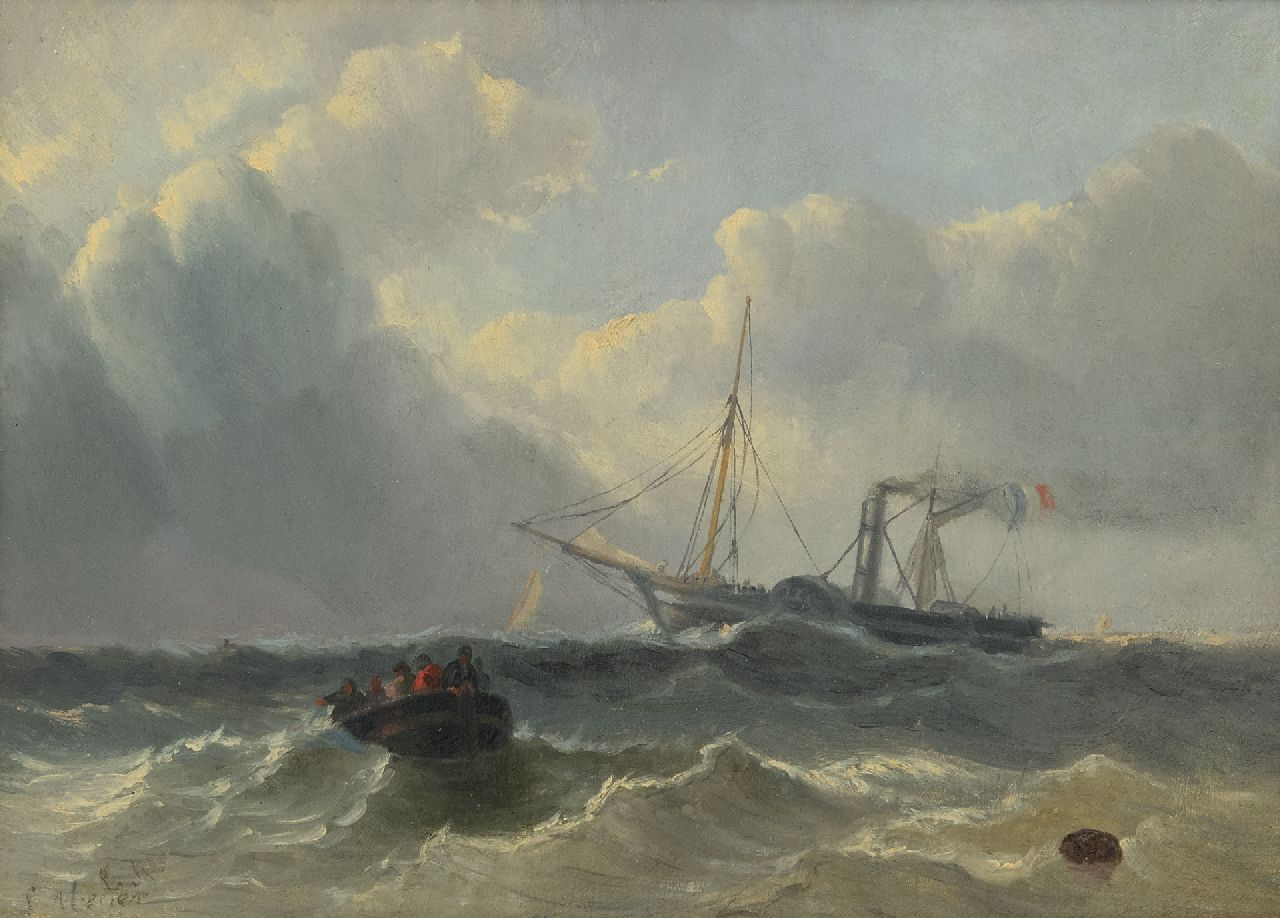
Louis Meijer French paddle steamer at sea

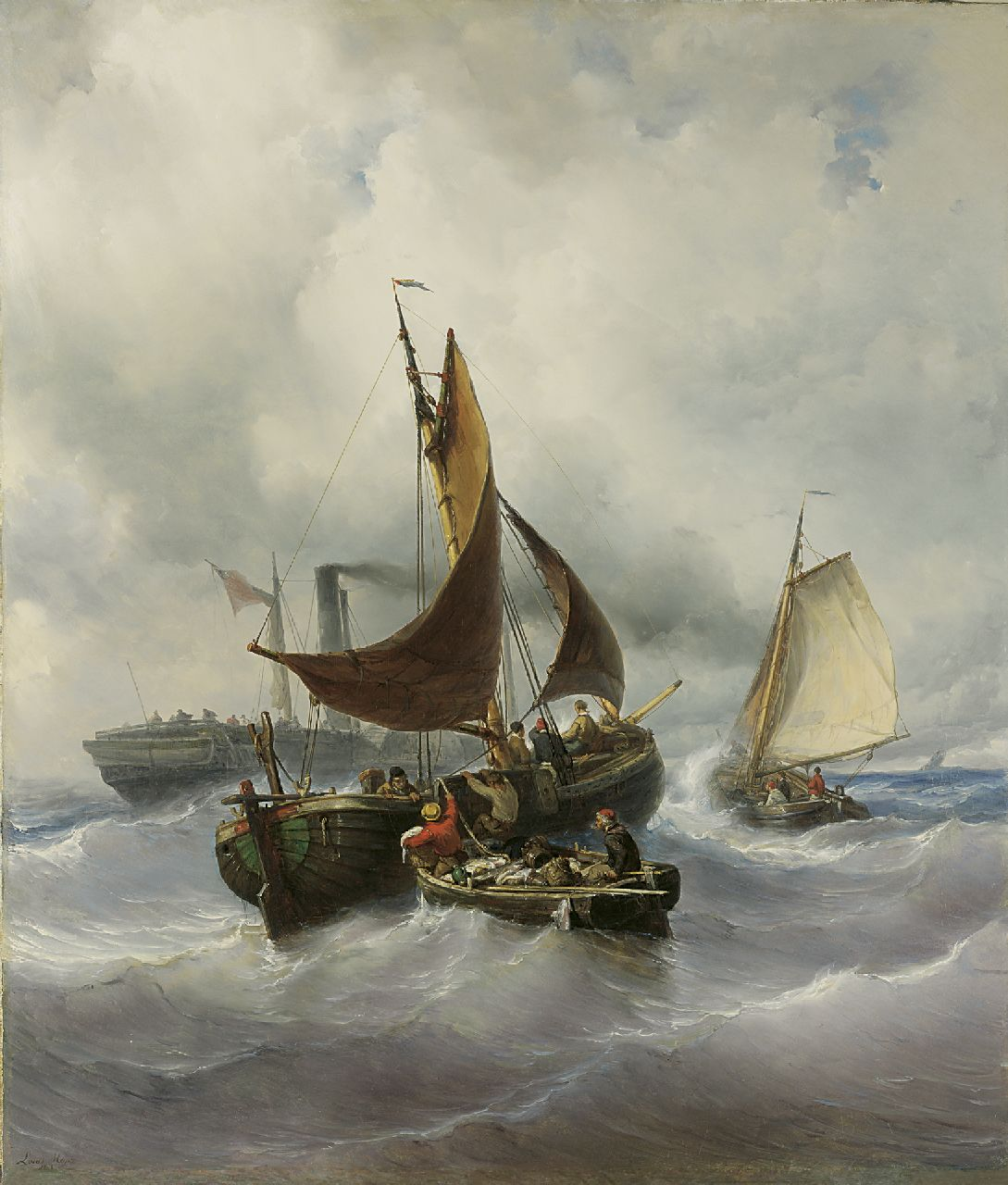
Louis Meijer Transferring the catch 1848

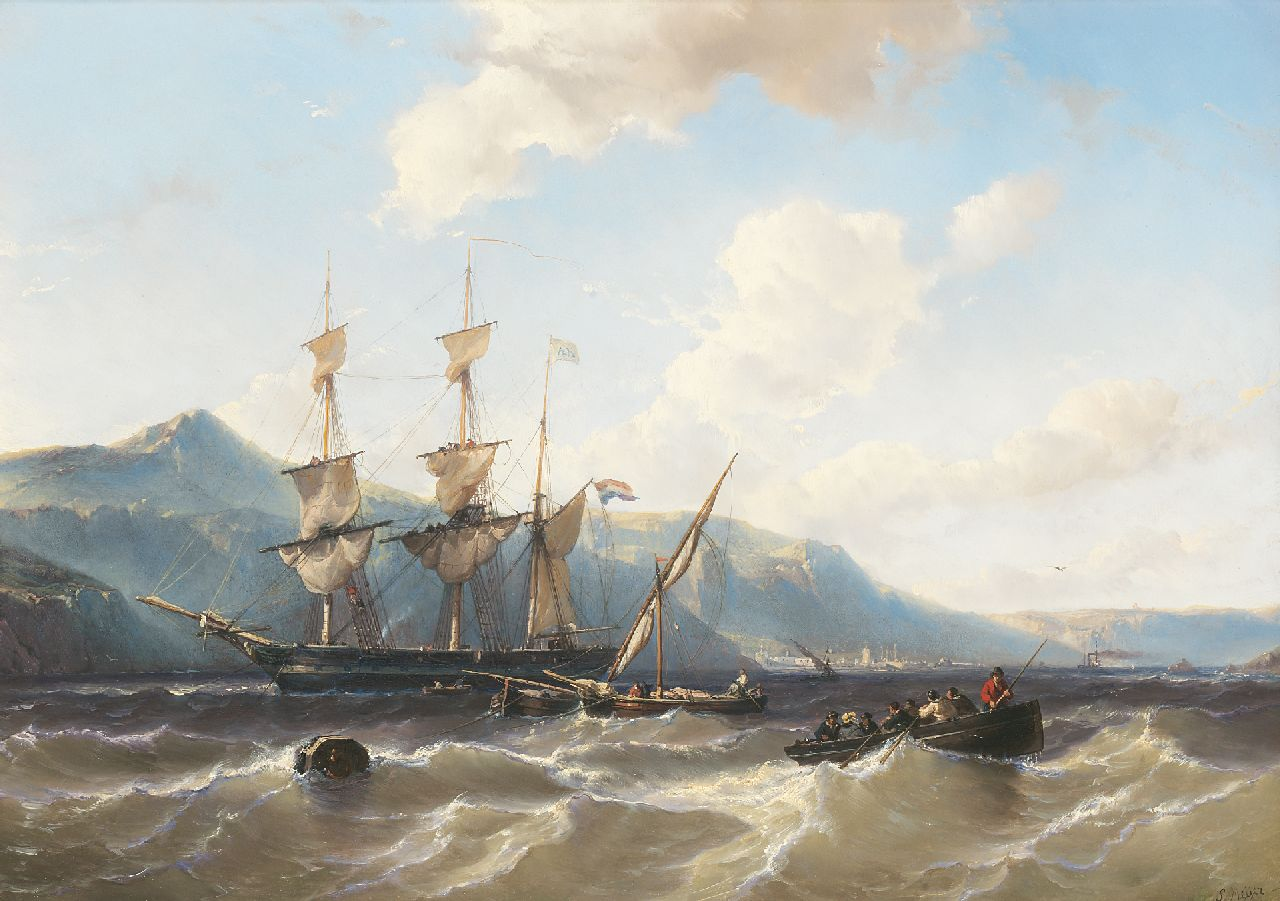
Louis Meijer A scooner, cargo vessels at Saint Helena

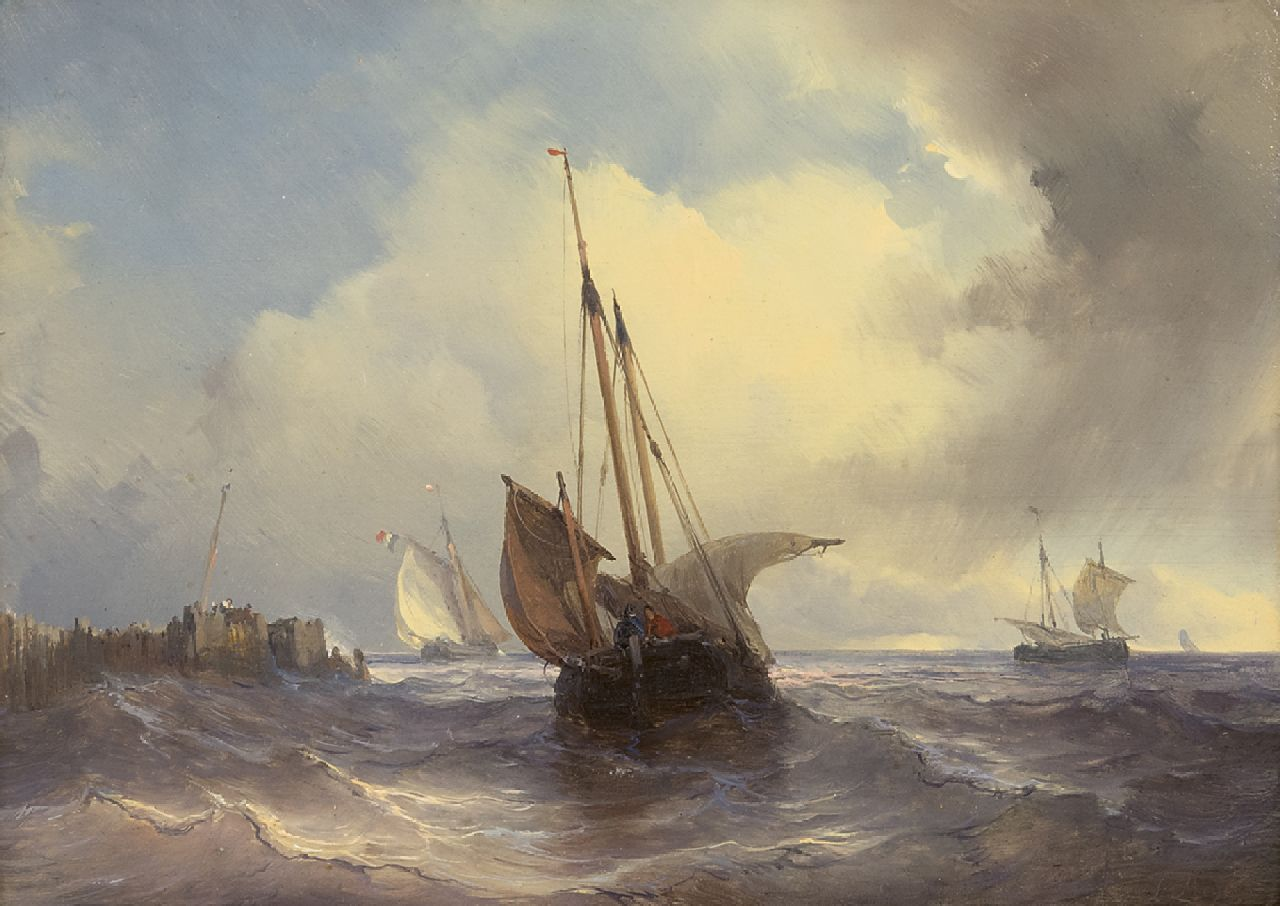
Louis Meijer Sailing ships on a choppy sea

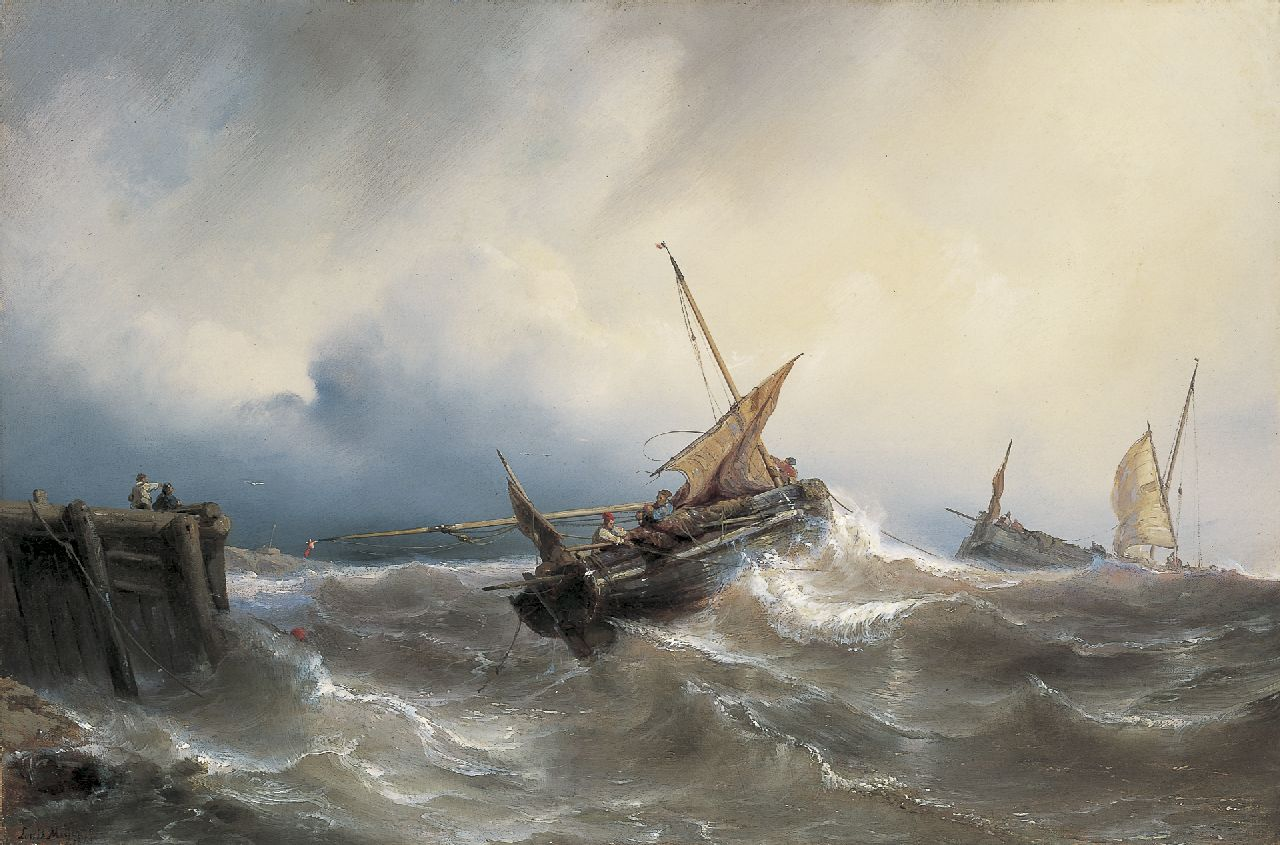
Louis Meijer Sailing vessels off the coast in stormy waters 1845

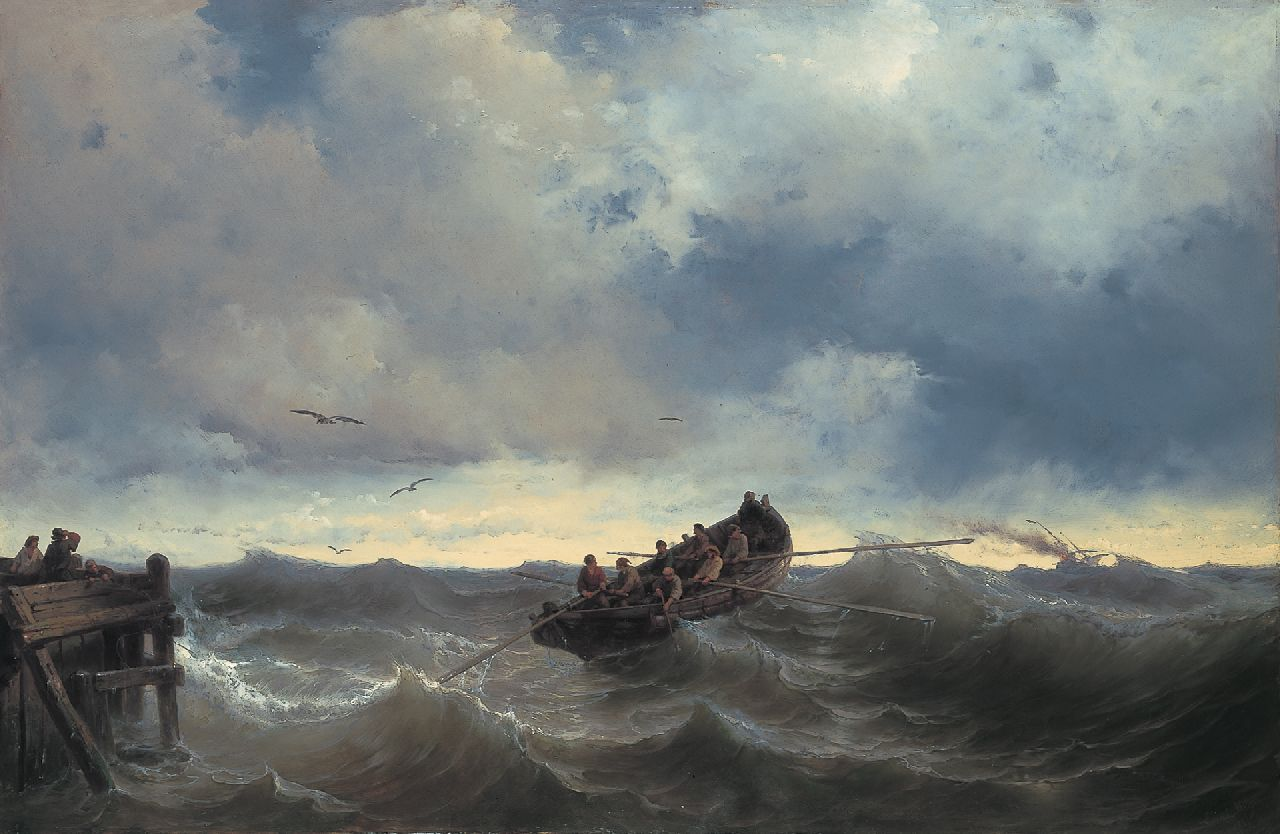
Louis Meijer Fishermen in a rowing boat 1857

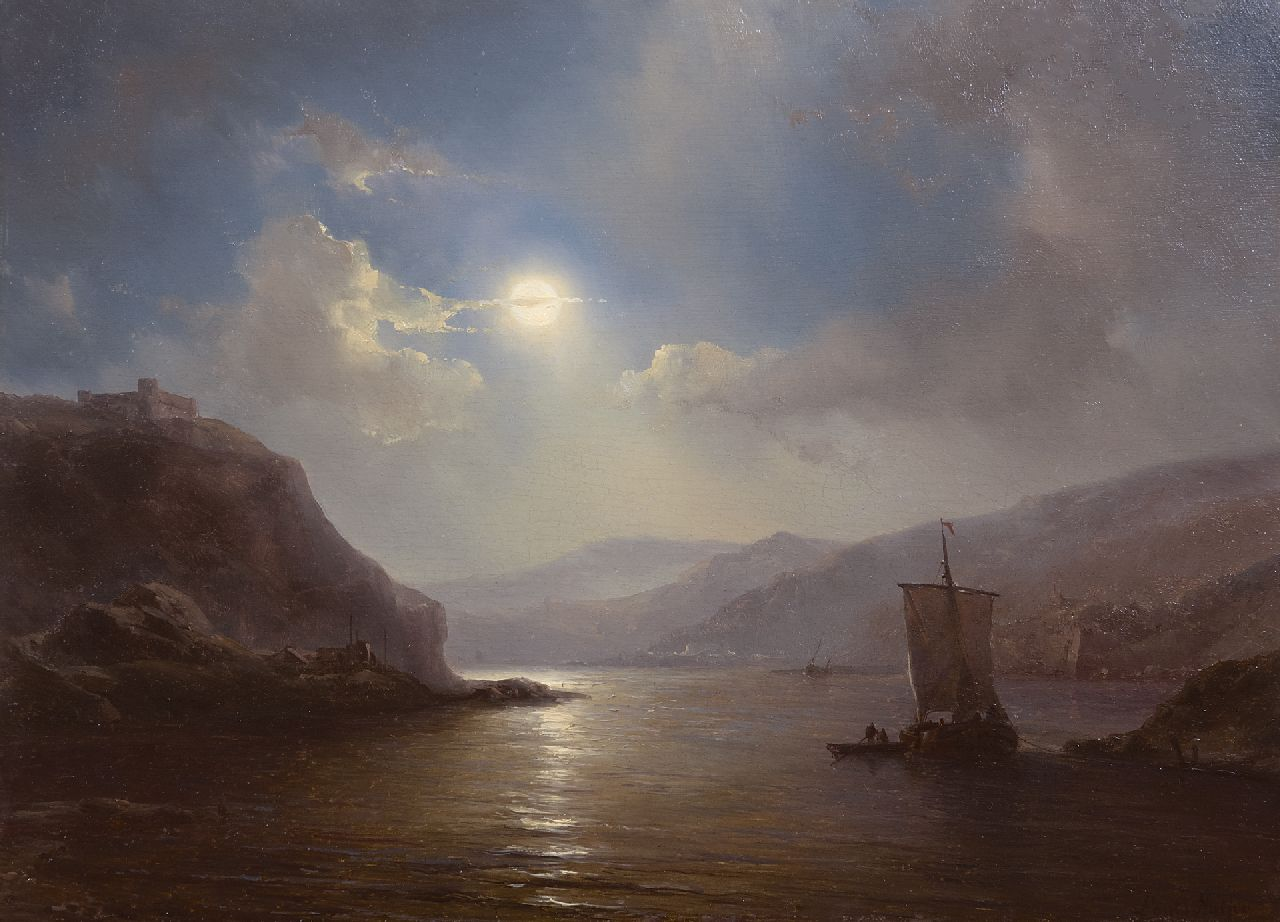
Louis Meijer A moonlit river landscape with a sailing ship

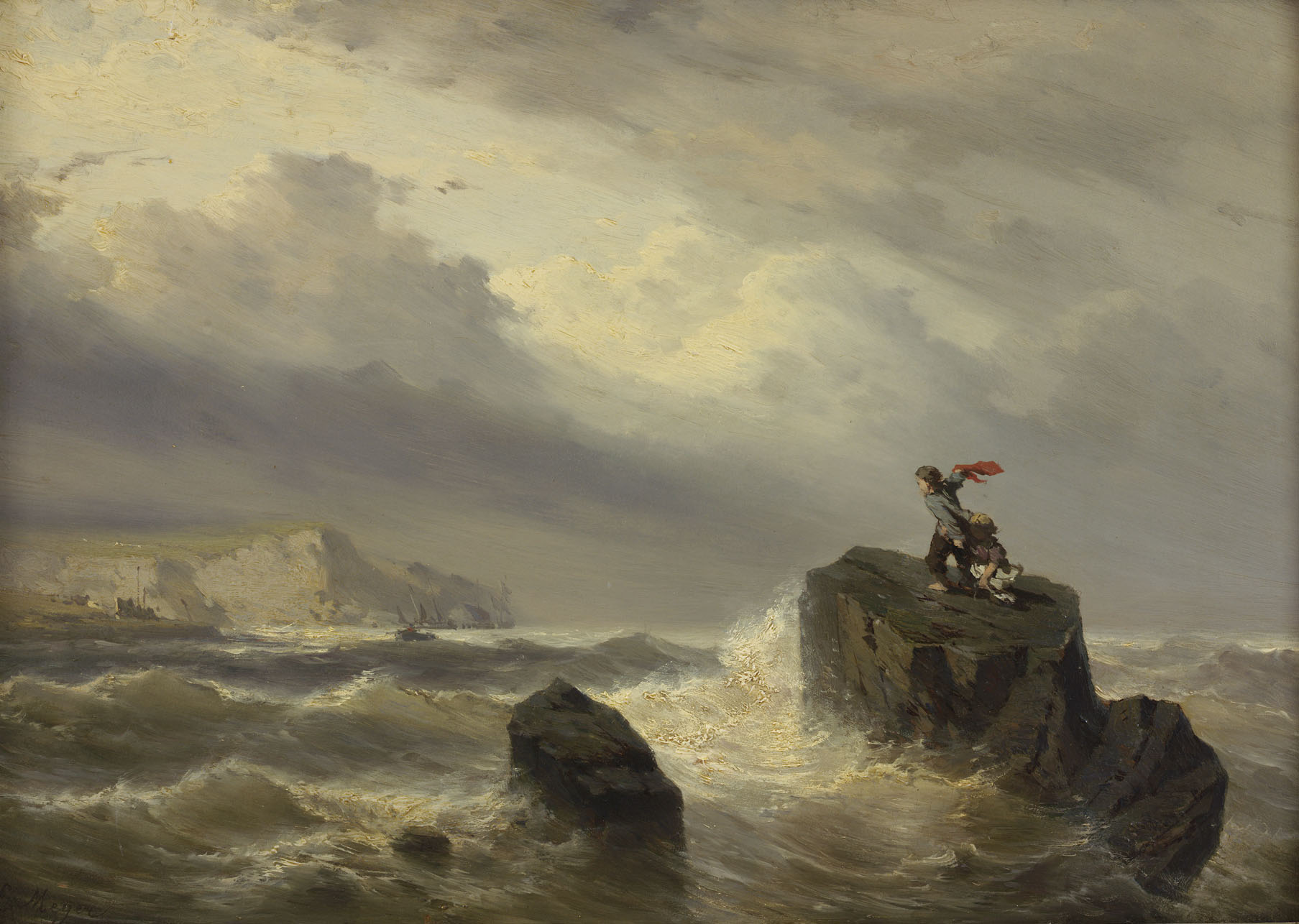
Louis Meijer - Kinderen op rots in volle zee

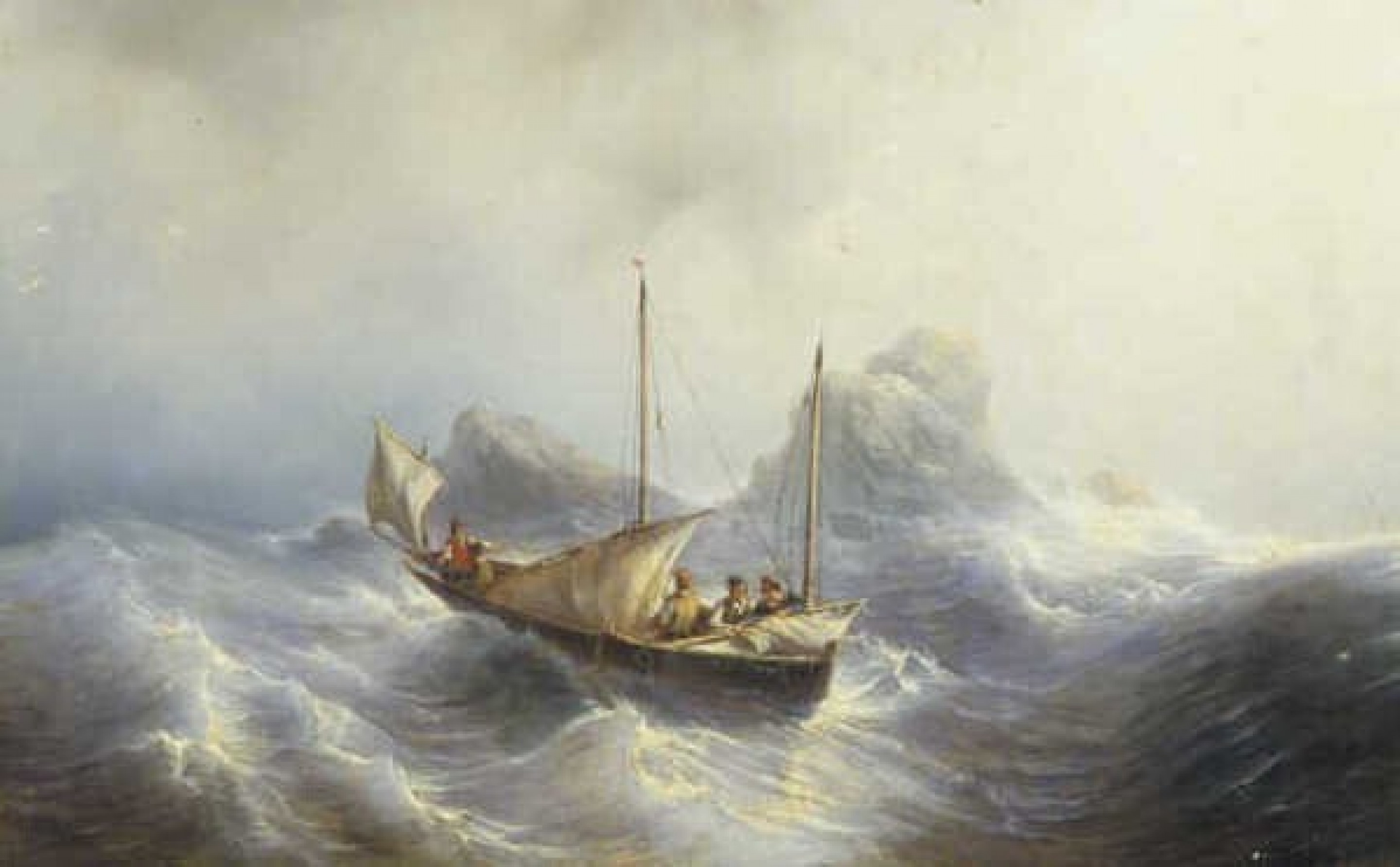
Louis Meijer - Zeegezicht

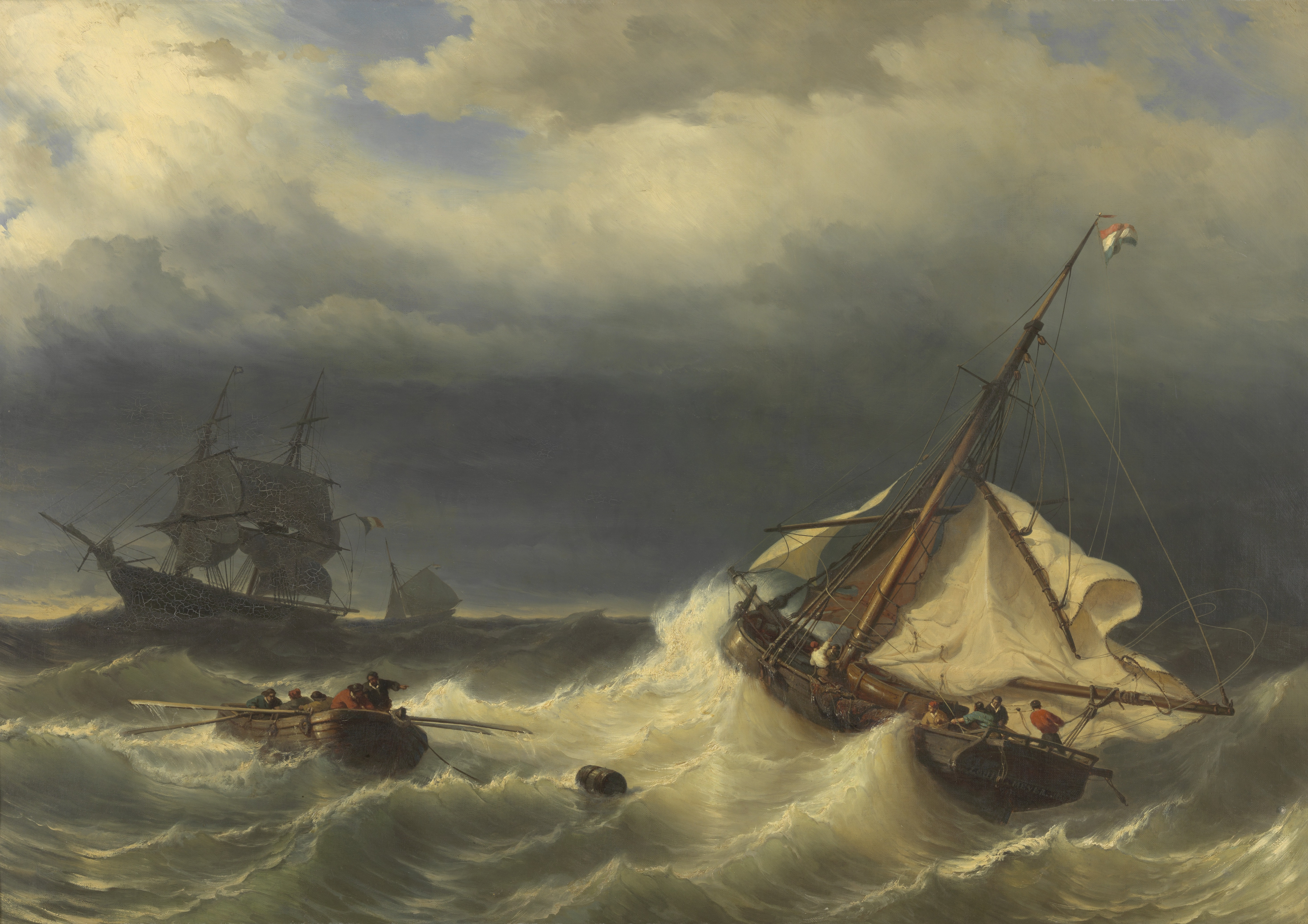
Louis Meijer - Schepen op zee bij stormachtig weer
