= The Submission of Prince Dipo Negoro to General De Kock =

Painting by Nicolaas Pieneman

- De onderwerping van Diepo Negoro aan Luitenant-generaal Baron De Kock (Dutch)
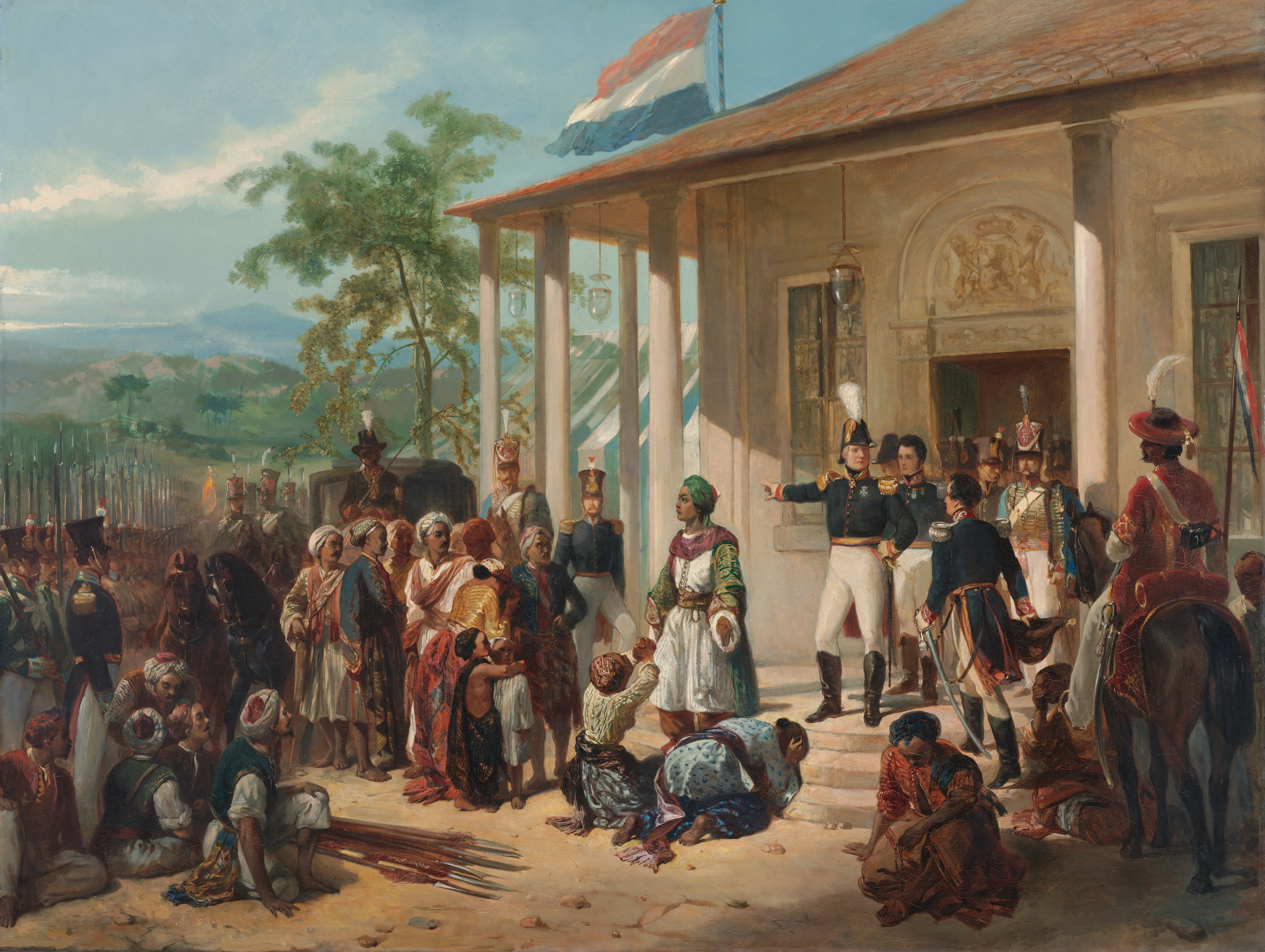
- Artist: Nicolaas Pieneman
- Year: c. 1830–35
- Medium: Oil on canvas
- Dimensions: 77 cm × 100 cm (30 in × 39 in)
- Location: Rijksmuseum, Amsterdam, Netherlands
- Accession: SK-A-2238

The Submission of Prince Dipo Negoro to General De Kock (Dutch: De onderwerping van Diepo Negoro aan Luitenant-generaal Baron De Kock) is an oil painting on canvas painted by Nicolaas Pieneman between 1830 and 1835. It depicts, from a victorious Dutch colonial perspective, the capture of Prince Diponegoro in 1830, which signaled the end of the Java War (1825–1830).

== Description ==
The painting depicts the capture of Prince Diponegoro, a Javanese noble and major leader in the Java War, by Lieutenant General Hendrik Merkus de Kock on 28 March 1830. The arrest is portrayed from a Dutch colonial perspective, with Diponegoro abandoning his followers and submitting peacefully to a confident De Kock as the Dutch flag flies high above the lieutenant general's home. Diponegoro stands a step below De Kock, who is pointing towards the carriage which will take the guerrilla leader into exile.

Diponegoro's soldiers leave their weapons on the ground, following their leader's submission; some throw themselves to the ground in front of him. All appear submissive to the Dutch power, in what the art historian Werner Krauss describes as recognition that "de Kock's stern action is for the best of the Javanese, and that poor General de Kock had no choice but to send Pangeran Diponegoro away, just like a loving father has to send a misguided son away in order to teach him a valuable lesson".

This oil painting on canvas measures 77 by 100 centimetres (30 by 39 in).

== History ==
Diponegoro (1785–1855), a descendant of the Sultans of Yogyakarta, was passed over several times for ascension to the throne. In 1825, after declaring himself Ratu Adil and his enemies infidels for their lax practice of Islam, he began a war against the reigning sultan and the Dutch colonial government. In the five-year struggle that followed, which was waged over much of central Java, over 220,000 Javanese people and 15,000 Dutch troops died. On 28 March 1830, with most other guerrilla leaders captured, Diponegoro was invited to come to Lieutenant General De Kock's home in Magelang to negotiate an end of hostilities and guaranteed safety of passage. There, after three hours, Diponegoro was arrested. He was exiled to Makassar, Sulawesi, where he remained until his death.

The Submission of Prince Dipo Negoro was commissioned by De Kock or his family. The artist, Nicolaas Pieneman, never went to the Dutch colony in the Indies, and thus it is unclear upon what he based his depictions of the area around De Kock's home, or the faces and other physical features of those depicted. Indeed, the Javanese soldiers appear more Arabian than indigene. It is possible that Pieneman was inspired by sketches by De Kock or his adjunct, Major Francois Victor Henri Antoine Ridder de Stuer.

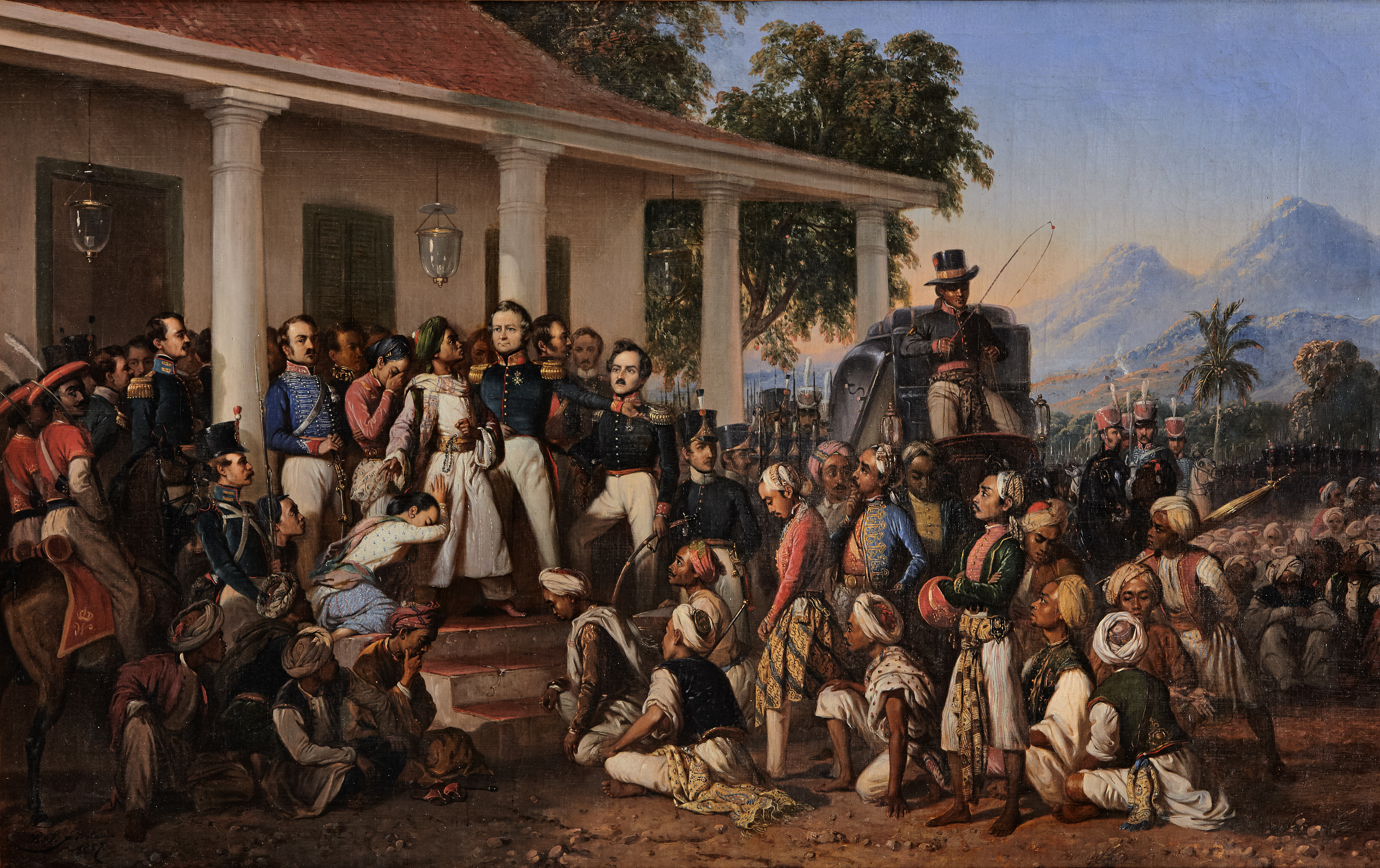
The Arrest of Pangeran Diponegoro, by Raden Saleh

This painting was held by the De Kock family, until it was donated to the Rijksmuseum in Amsterdam on 29 January 1907 by F.L.W. de Kock. Between 1 December 1993 and 31 March 1994, it was part of an exhibition of colonial art in Harderwijk. In 2014, it was on display in Room 1.17 of the Rijksmuseum.

Diponegoro's capture is the subject of another painting, The Arrest of Pangeran Diponegoro by the Javanese nobleman Raden Saleh, which was completed in 1857 and presented to King William III. Opposed to the submissive and beaten Diponegoro of Pieneman's painting, Saleh depicts him as an angry and defiant man who is struggling to control his emotions, on par with or even having more power than De Kock, who is positioned on the left or "female" side. The author Susie Protschky describes both Pieneman and Saleh's works as "two of the best known history paintings from the Indies".

== Works cited ==
- "Diponegoro". MSN Encarta. Archived from the original on 1 November 2009.
- Krauss, Werner (2005). "Raden Saleh's Interpretation of the Arrest of Diponegoro: An Example of Indonesian "proto-nationalist" Modernism". Archipel. 69: 259–94. doi:10.3406/arch.2005.3934.
- Levie, S.H. (1978). Het Vaderlandsch Gevoel [The Sense of Fatherland]. Amsterdam: Rijksmuseum. OCLC 4384099.
- Protschky, Susie (2011). Images of the Tropics: Environment and Visual Culture in Colonial Indonesia. Verhandelingen van het Koninklijk Instituut voor Taal-, Land- en Volkenkunde. Vol. 270. Leiden: KITLV Press. ISBN 978-1-299-78406-2.
- Rajaram, Prem Kumar (2014). Ruling the Margins: Colonial Power and Administrative Rule in the Past and Present. Hoboken: Taylor and Francis. ISBN 978-1-317-62107-2.
- "The Arrest of Diepo Negoro by Lieutenant-General Baron De Kock". Rijksmuseum. Archived from the original on 6 October 2014.
