= Bockenkrieg =

1804 uprising in the canton of Zurich

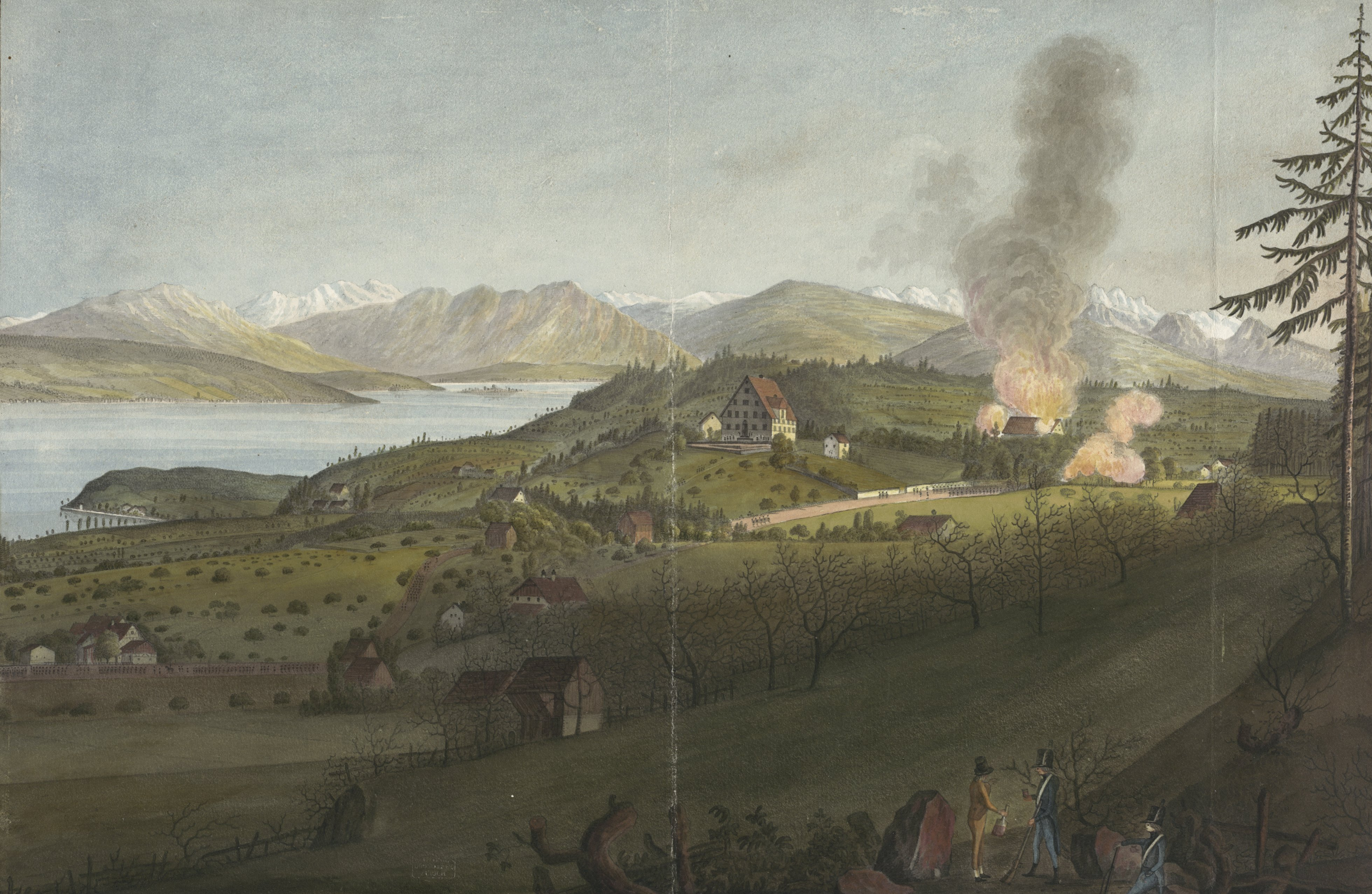
- The Bocken estate after the fight of 28 March 1804, by Johann Jakob Aschmann
- Date: 24 March – 3 April 1804
- Location: Left shore of Lake Zurich and Knonauer Amt, canton of Zurich
- Type: Uprising
- Cause: Discontent over new laws introduced during the Mediation
- Participants: About 600 insurgents; government troops of Zurich; troops from Bern and Aargau
- Outcome: Uprising broken; the area occupied and disarmed; three leaders executed

The Bockenkrieg (lit. 'Bocken War') was an uprising in the canton of Zurich in March and April 1804, during the period of the Mediation. About 600 men from the communes on the left shore of Lake Zurich and the Knonauer Amt, led by the shoemaker Hans Jakob Willi from Horgen, defeated the government troops under Colonel Jakob Christoph Ziegler in a fight at Bocken above Horgen on 28 March 1804. Niklaus Rudolf von Wattenwyl, the Landammann of Switzerland, mobilized troops from Bern and Aargau and broke the uprising, which ended on 3 April with the occupation of this part of the canton. Willi and two other leaders were executed.

== History ==
The introduction of new laws during the Mediation caused discontent among the rural population on Lake Zurich. On 24 March 1804 an arson attack on the castle of Wädenswil gave the signal for a spontaneous uprising by some people of the Zurich countryside (Landschäftler). Led by Willi, about 600 men from the communes on the left shore of the lake and the Knonauer Amt marched on Zurich. On 28 March 1804, in a fight at Bocken above Horgen, they defeated the government troops called up under Colonel Ziegler.

Von Wattenwyl, the Landammann of Switzerland, mobilized troops from Bern and Aargau even before an official request for help had arrived from Zurich. He broke the uprising at Affoltern am Albis and ended the Bockenkrieg on 3 April with the occupation of this part of the canton, its disarmament and the collection of a levy (Kontribution). Willi and two other leaders were executed.

== Bibliography ==
- A. Hauser, Der Bockenkrieg, 1938
- H. Foerster, Der Bockenkrieg 1804, 1987
