= Hans Jakob Ziegler =

Swiss physician (1638–1683)

- Born: 28 December 1638 (or 13 August 1640); Zürich, Switzerland
- Died: 19 June 1683; Zürich, Switzerland
- Occupation: Physician

Hans Jakob Ziegler (28 December 1638 or 13 August 1640 – 19 June 1683) was a Swiss physician from Zürich. He served as physician of the city of Zürich and published descriptions of thermal baths as well as works on earthquakes and comets.

== Biography ==
Ziegler was the son of Jakob, a physician and master of the Boatmen's guild, and of Veronika Landolt. In 1661 he married Dorothea Wolf, daughter of Hans Kaspar, a representative of the Boatmen's guild in the Grand Council, administrator of the former Rüti Abbey, and keeper of the granary. He trained as a pharmacist in Zürich and studied medicine at Basel and Valence, receiving his doctorate in 1663.

From 1664 Ziegler was physician of the city of Zürich. He published descriptions of thermal baths (Girenbad, 1662; Schinznach, 1663; Urdorf, 1676), as well as two short works on earthquakes (1674) and on the origin of comets (1680).

== Bibliography ==
- C. C. Keller, Zürcherische Apotheken und Apotheker, 1893, 34
- C. Escher, "Die Zürcherfamilie Ziegler", in ZTb 1919, 1918, 77–134, especially 105–106
