= Johann Jakob Wetzel =

Swiss landscape painter (1783–1834)

- Born: 29 December 1783; Hirslanden (today part of Zürich), Switzerland
- Died: 22 September 1834 (aged 50); Richterswil, Switzerland
- Occupation: Landscape painter

Johann Jakob Wetzel (29 December 1783 – 22 September 1834) was a Swiss landscape painter. He is counted among the Swiss little masters, and his main work was the Voyages pittoresques aux lacs de la Suisse, a series of Swiss and Italian views published between 1817 and 1827.

== Biography ==
Wetzel was the son of a master turner. In 1813 he married Emerentiana Ziegler, daughter of Jakob Christoph, keeper of the Schützen inn. He trained under Johann Heinrich Bleuler (1794–1797) and then at the art workshop of Johannes Walser at Herisau, where he worked for Gabriel Lory father and son. After a period with the publisher Osterwald at Neuchâtel (1809), he returned to Zürich in 1810 and worked as an independent landscape painter. He was a member of the Zürich artists' society from 1813.

His main work, the Voyages pittoresques aux lacs de la Suisse, appeared between 1817 and 1827 at Orell Füssli. It is a series of 137 views of Switzerland and Italy, engraved in aquatint notably by Franz Hegi. He also produced wash drawings, watercolors, and watercolored etchings. Wetzel is counted among the Swiss little masters.

== Bibliography ==
- DBAS, 1120–1121
