= Adrian Ziegler =

Swiss apothecary and bailiff (1584–1654)

- Born: 24 December 1584; Zürich, Switzerland
- Died: 6/8 May 1654; Zürich, Switzerland
- Occupations: Apothecary, bailiff

Adrian Ziegler (24 December 1584 – 6/8 May 1654) was a Swiss apothecary and bailiff from Zürich. He ran the Zum Psalter pharmacy, served as bailiff of Sax-Forstegg, and was active in the manufacture of saltpeter and gunpowder and in the city's artillery.

== Biography ==
Ziegler was the son of Adrian, a councillor, and of Barbara Gertenhauser. He married four times: in 1607 Anna Hess, daughter of Kaspar, a representative of the Widder guild in the Grand Council; in 1612 Susanna von Schönau, daughter of Johann Jakob, a colonel; in 1628 Margareta Meiss, daughter of Hans Balthasar, bailiff of Greifensee; and after 1630 Regula Steiner, daughter of Hans Peter, a representative of the Meisen guild in the Grand Council and widow of David Werdmüller.

Ziegler was secretary of the Saffron guild, which he represented in the Grand Council of Zürich (1624), and then bailiff of Sax-Forstegg in the Rheintal (1626), from which his descendants took the name Ziegler von Sax. In 1608 he opened the Zum Psalter pharmacy in the family house and published, in 1616 and 1628, a catalogue of the medicines available there (Pharmacopoea spagyrica).

A manufacturer of saltpeter and gunpowder, and co-author in 1618 of an inventory of the Zürich artillery (Archeley Der Statt Zürich, held in the cantonal archives), he carried out test firings with the city's forty-four new cannon (1621) and supervised the construction of fortifications (1626).

== Bibliography ==
- F. Ledermann, ed., Biographies des pharmaciens suisses, 1993, 366–368
