= Leonhard Ziegler =

Swiss bookseller and politician (1782–1854)

- Born: 2 March 1782; Zürich, Switzerland
- Died: 12 August 1854 (aged 72); Munich, Germany
- Occupations: Bookseller, politician

Leonhard Ziegler (2 March 1782 – 12 August 1854) was a Swiss bookseller and politician from Zürich. He ran the Ziegler & Söhne bookshop and was a co-founder of the city's first permanent theater.

== Biography ==
Ziegler was the son of Leonhard Ziegler, a bookseller and paper manufacturer, and of Anna Margaretha Ott. He married first, in 1812, Anna Magdalena Grob, and second, in 1829, Elisabetha Schulthess, daughter of Hans Conrad. On the death of his father in 1800, the founder of the Ziegler & Söhne, Ziegler continued to run it with his brother Adrian until 1838.

With Johann Georg Bürkli, Ziegler was a co-founder of the Aktientheater, the first permanent theater in Zürich (1833). He was a deputy in the Grand Council of Zürich (1836–1839) and cantonal administrator of hospitals (1834–1843), in which capacity he supervised the construction of the Zürich cantonal hospital.

== Bibliography ==
- C. Escher, "Die Zürcherfamilie Ziegler", in ZTb 1918, 1917, 77–134, especially 123–126
- Journal des imprimeurs suisses, 9 August 1946
- F. Hofer, S. Hägeli, Zürcher Personen-Lexikon, 1986, 386
