= Hendrik Merkus de Kock =

Dutch military officer, colonial administrator, and politician

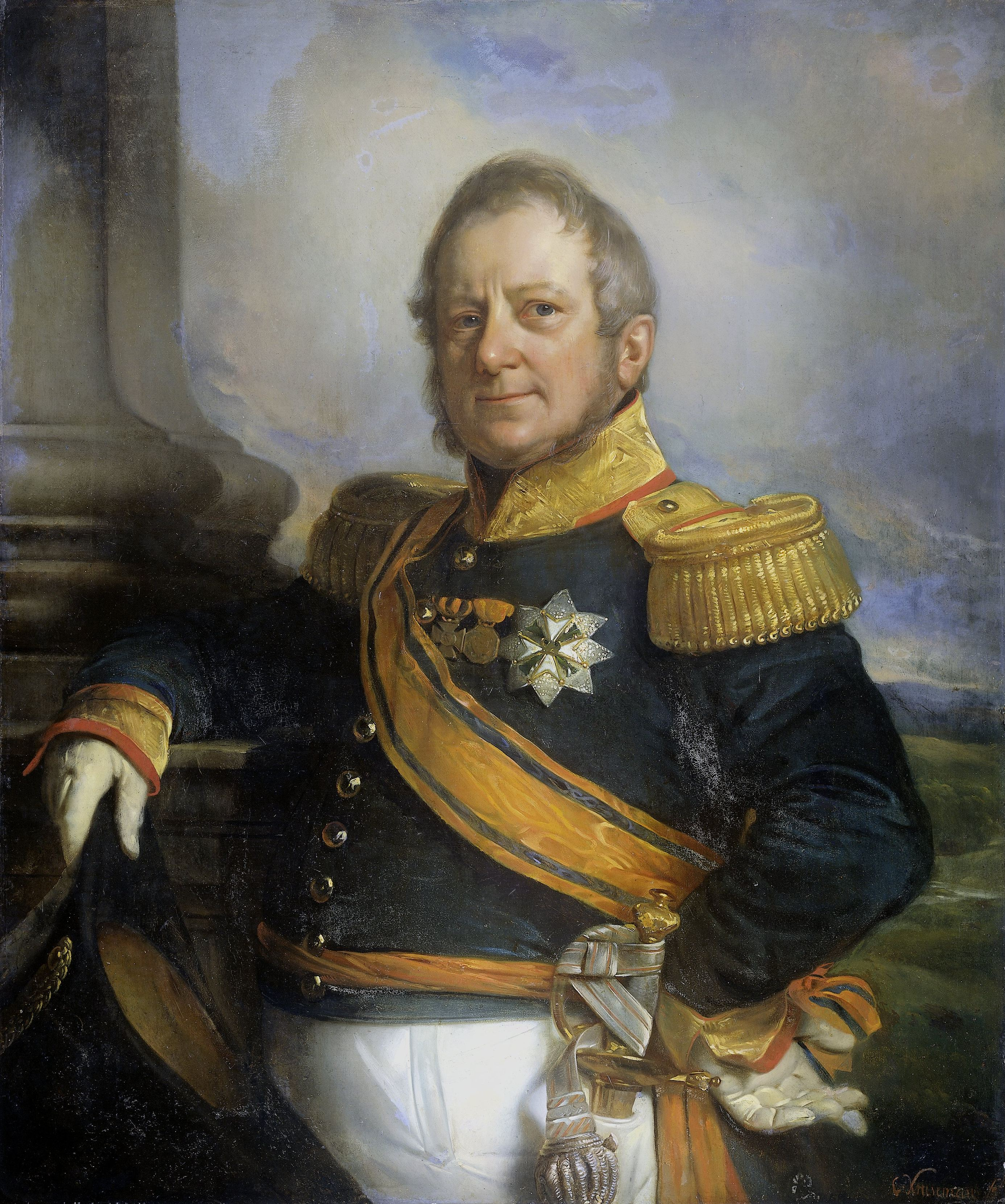
- Portrait by Cornelis Kruseman, c. 1826–1845

Member of the Senate
- In office 1 July 1842 – 12 April 1845
- Monarch: William II

Minister of the Interior
- In office 1 December 1836 – 1 June 1841
- Monarchs: William I; William II
- Preceded by: Hendrik Jacob van Doorn
- Succeeded by: William Schimmelpenninck van der Oye

Governor-General of the Dutch East Indies
- Lieutenant
- In office 2 January 1826 – 16 January 1830
- Monarch: William I
- Governor-General: Leonard du Bus de Gisignies
- Preceded by: Godert van der Capellen
- Succeeded by: Johannes van den Bosch

Personal details
- Born: 25 May 1779 Heusden, Dutch Republic
- Died: 12 April 1845 (aged 65) The Hague, Netherlands
- Parents: Johannes Conradus de Kock (father); Maria Petronella Merkus (mother)
- Relatives: Charles Paul de Kock (brother)

Military service
- Allegiance: Batavian Republic; Dutch East Indies
- Branch/service: Batavian Navy; Dutch East Indies Army
- Rank: Lieutenant general
- Battles/wars: Diponegoro War
- Awards: Military William Order

Hendrik Merkus, Baron de Kock (25 May 1779 – 12 April 1845) was a Dutch military officer, colonial administrator and politician who served as lieutenant governor-general of the Dutch East Indies from 1826 to 1830. He also served as Minister of the Interior from 1836 to 1841.

== Life ==
Hendrik Merkus de Kock was born on 25 May 1779 in Heusden, Dutch Republic. His father was Jean Conrad de Kock, a banker who was guillotined in Paris, and his mother was Maria Petronella Merkus.

In 1801, he joined the Batavian Navy, and by 1807 was posted to the Dutch East Indies. In 1821 he commanded a military expedition to Palembang to suppress a local uprising. Later, as Lieutenant Governor-General (1826–1830), De Kock led the fight against Prince Diponegoro in the Java War.

The triumphant commander was declared a baron in 1835, and served in the Dutch Government as Minister of the Interior from 1836 to 1841. He was Minister of State from 1841 to 1845. He remained a member of the First Chamber of parliament until his death. He died in The Hague on 12 April 1845.

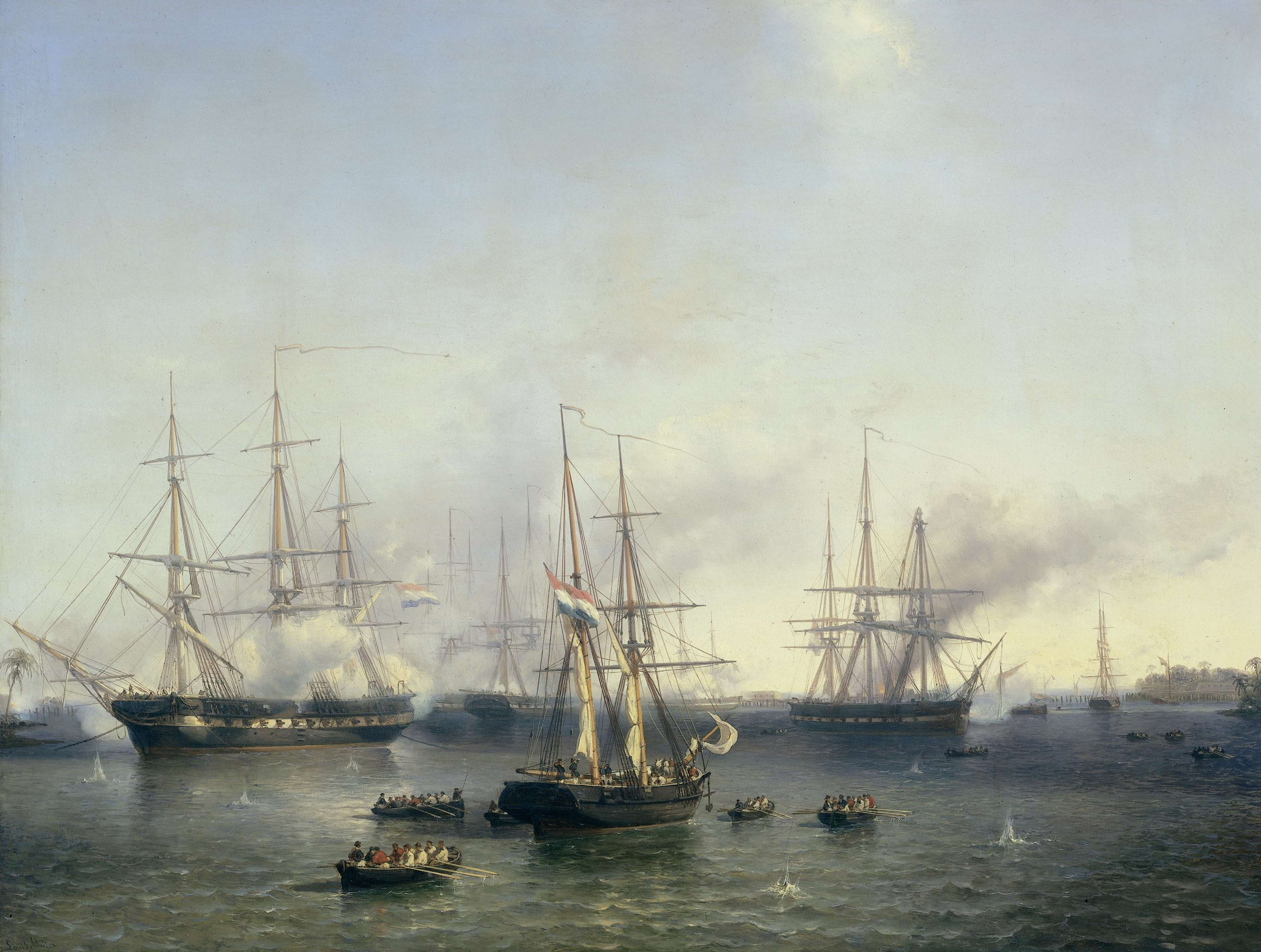
De Kock's fleet conquering Palembang in 1821, by Louis Meijer

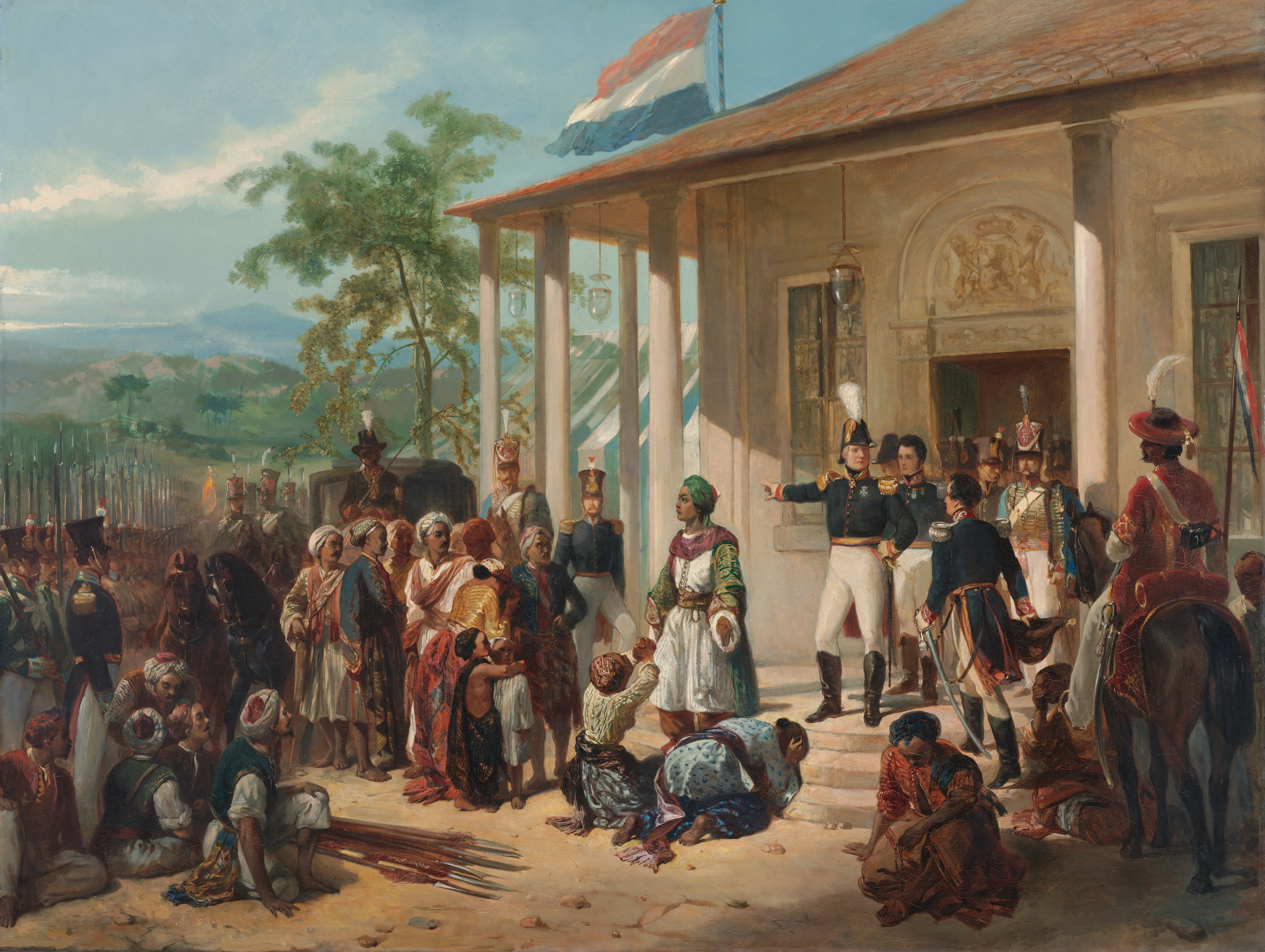
The Submission of Prince Dipo Negoro to General De Kock (1830) by Nicolaas Pieneman

== Honors ==
- Knight in the Order of the Union (1807)
- Commander in the Order of the Union (1808)
- Commander in the Order of the Reunion (1812)
- Knight 3rd Class Military William Order (1815)
- Commander Military William Order (1821)
- Grand Cross Military William Order (1830)
- Grand Cross Order of the Netherlands Lion (1841)

Political offices
Preceded by Godert van der Capellen	Governor-General of the Dutch East Indies (lieutenant); 1826–1830; Served under: Leonard du Bus de Gisignies	Succeeded by Johannes van den Bosch
Preceded by Hendrik Jacob van Doorn	Minister of the Interior; 1836–1841	Succeeded by Willem Schimmelpenninck van der Oye
