= Jakob Christoph Ziegler (general) =

Swiss officer and politician (1768–1859)

- Born: 1 October 1768; Zürich, Switzerland
- Died: 10 February 1859 (aged 90); Zürich, Switzerland
- Occupations: Military officer, politician

Jakob Christoph Ziegler (1 October 1768 – 10 February 1859) was a Swiss military officer and conservative politician from Zürich.

== Biography ==
Ziegler was the son of Jakob Christoph Ziegler, an agronomist and landowner at Neftenbach, and of Anna Elisabetha Escher vom Glas. After receiving military training in a Swiss regiment in French service (1785–1791), he transferred in 1792—probably following the disbandment of the Swiss troops after the massacre of the Tuileries—to Austrian and Zürich service. In 1795 he married Johanna Margaretha Meiss von Teufen, daughter of Hans Meiss von Teufen, lord of the manor of Teufen; the couple had eight children.

=== Military career ===
In May 1799, during a revolt against measures taken by the Helvetic Republic and against the occupying troops, Ziegler unexpectedly became the leader of the inhabitants of Neftenbach, for which he was condemned to death in absentia by a French military court. After the French evacuated Zürich on 6 June 1799, he took command of a battalion of the Swiss émigré regiment of Niklaus Franz von Bachmann. In English service and under Austrian command, he fought the French troops until the Peace of Lunéville (9 February 1801). Ziegler directed part of the city's defense during the bombardment of Zürich by the Helvetic army under Joseph Leonz Andermatt (September 1802) and took part with his battalion in the campaign against the Helvetic government (the war of the sticks), which lasted until October 1802. After the change of regime, he was promoted to colonel of the federal army.

From the start of the Mediation (1803), Ziegler served on the Zürich and federal military commissions and devised a new military organization at the cantonal (cantonal militias) and federal levels. He commanded the federal troops that suppressed the uprising of certain Zürich communes in the Bocken war of 1804 and led a division during the occupation of the frontiers in 1805 and 1809.

After the French defeat of 1814, Ziegler again entered foreign service, taking command of a regiment in his own name in the service of Holland, with a nominal strength of about 2,000 men (1815–1829). During Napoleon's Hundred Days (March to June 1815), Swiss troops, including Ziegler's, were tasked with defending the city of Maastricht. Promoted major general in 1816, he was stationed at Gorinchem until 1817, then at Liège from 1817 to 1819 (commander of the province of the same name from 1818) and at Namur from 1819 to 1825 (provincial commander). Letters from a non-commissioned officer of the same name based in Sumatra suggest that he also acted as a liaison between the Swiss in the Dutch colonies and their relatives in the Confederation. In 1824 the king of the Netherlands awarded him the Order of the Netherlands Lion. Before returning to Switzerland, Ziegler was last stationed at Breda (1825–1830). During his time in Holland he was never engaged in combat.

=== Political career ===
In politics, Ziegler sat on the Grand Council (1804–1814 and 1831–1838) and the Small Council (1805–1815; cantonal governments) of the canton of Zürich. In 1806 he took part in the founding of the Swiss Society of Artists, created on the model of the Zürich fine arts society; from 1834 to 1838 he presided over the Zürich artists' society. He spent the last years of his life in the Zum Pelikan house in Zürich, built by his great-great-granduncle Jakob Christoph Ziegler.

== Works ==
- Ziegler, Jakob Christoph; Nüscheler, David, "Erinnerungen aus dem Leben des General-Majors Jakob Christoph Ziegler", in Neujahrsblatt der Feuerwerker-Gesellschaft (Artillerie-Kollegium) in Zürich, 79, 1884, pp. 5–47; 80, 1885, pp. 5–41

== Bibliography ==
- Eidgenössische Zeitung, 12 February 1859; 13 February 1859; 14 February 1859
- Meyer von Knonau, Ludwig, "Ziegler, Jakob Christoph", in Allgemeine Deutsche Biographie, 45, 1900, pp. 180–182
- Schmid, Stefan G., Die Zürcher Kantonsregierung seit 1803, 2003, p. 324

=== Archives ===
- Zentralbibliothek Zürich, Zürich, Jakob Christoph Ziegler (1768–1859)
