= Jakob Christoph Ziegler (silk manufacturer) =

Swiss silk manufacturer (1647–1718)

- Born: 3 February 1647; Zürich, Switzerland
- Died: 1718 (aged 70–71); Zürich, Switzerland
- Occupations: Silk manufacturer, postmaster

Jakob Christoph Ziegler (3 February 1647 – 1718) was a Swiss silk manufacturer in Zürich. He ran what became the leading textile manufactory in Zürich in the 17th century and was the first lessee of the postal service between Zürich and Italy.

== Biography ==
Ziegler was the son of Christoph, a physician pensioned by the city of Bern and a manufacturer in Zürich, and of Barbara Vögelin. He married first Margaretha Imholz and second Dorothea Hofmeister. He was the first lessee of the postal service between Zürich and Italy.

After an apprenticeship with a silk manufacturer in Bergamo, Ziegler founded the firm Jacob und Christoph Ziegler with his father in 1665. When his father withdrew in 1677, Ziegler continued the business with his brother Leonhard and moved the manufactory into the Zum Pelikan house, where it prospered to become the principal textile manufactory in Zürich in the 17th century. The low wages it paid led the commercial directorate to adopt new wage regulations for the sector in order to stabilize their level (1687–1688).

== Bibliography ==
- U. Pfister, Die Zürcher Fabriques, 1992, especially 194–197
