= Hamengkubuwono VI =

Sultan of Yogyakarta from 1855 to 1877

Hamengkubuwana VI ꦲꦩꦼꦁꦏꦸꦨꦸꦮꦤ꧇꧖꧇
- Sri Sultan Hamengkubuwana VI
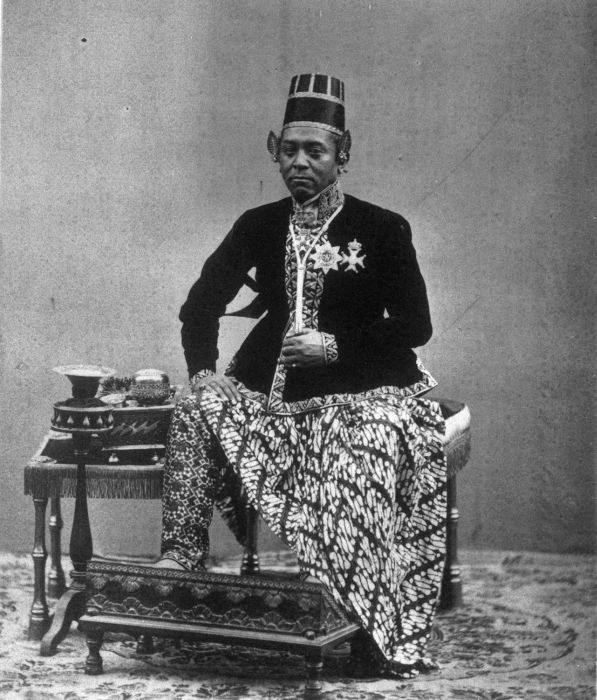
- Sri Sultan Hamengkubuwana VI

6th Sultan of Yogyakarta
- Reign: 5 July 1855 – 20 July 1877
- Coronation: 5 July 1855
- Predecessor: Hamengkubuwono V
- Successor: Hamengkubuwono VII
- Born: Gusti Raden Mas Mustojo; 10 August 1821; Kraton Yogyakarta, Yogyakarta
- Died: 20 July 1877 (aged 55); Kraton Yogyakarta, Yogyakarta
- Burial: Astana Besiyaran, Imogiri, Yogyakarta
- Spouses: Gusti Kanjeng Ratu Kencana of Surakarta (m. 1848) Gusti Kanjeng Ratu Sultan
- Issue: 23 children include Hamengkubuwono VII
Names
- Ngarsa Dalem Sampeyan Dalem Ingkang Sinuwun Kanjeng Sultan Hamengkubuwana Senapati-ing-Ngalaga 'Abdurrahman Sayyidin Panatagama Khalifatullah ingkang Jumeneng Kaping Enem ing Ngayogyakarta Hadiningrat
- House: Mataram
- Father: Sultan Hamengkubuwana IV
- Mother: Gusti Kanjeng Ratu Kencono
- Religion: Islam

Sri Sultan Hamengkubuwono VI (10 August 1821 – 20 July 1877), also spelled Hamengkubuwana VI, was the sixth Sultan of Yogyakarta of the Yogyakarta Sultanate, who reigned from 1855 until 1877. He succeeded his older brother, Hamengkubuwono V, who died in the midst of political instability within the Yogyakarta Palace.

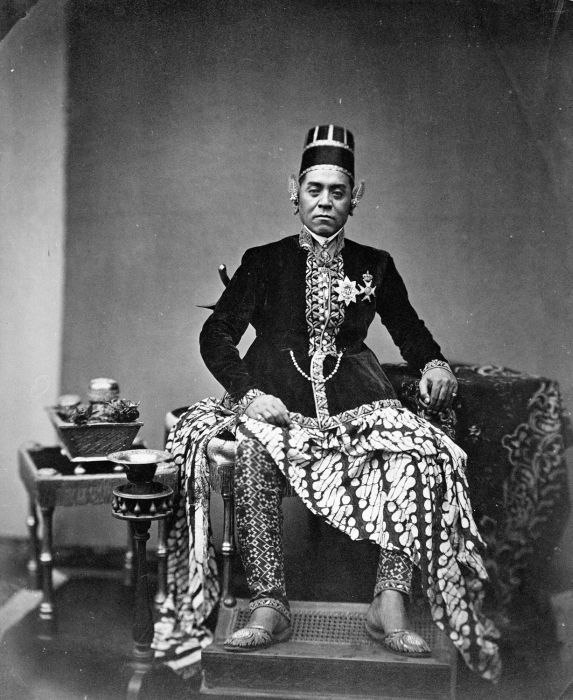
Hamengkubuwono VI

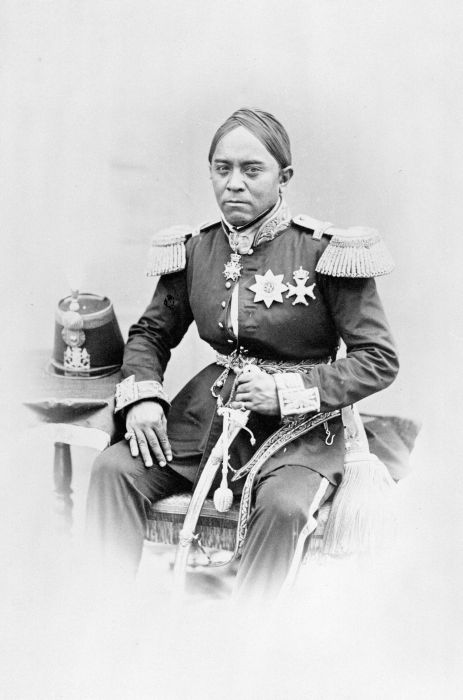
Hamengkubuwono VI

== Reign ==
Sultan Hamengkubuwana VI was born under the name Raden Mas Mustojo, the son of Sultan Hamengkubuwana II (historically identified as Hamengkubuwana IV in some sources), born in 1821 to a concubine.

Hamengkubuwana VI ascended the throne in 1855, succeeding Hamengkubuwana V after the latter died suddenly. During his reign, a major earthquake struck the region, destroying large parts of the Keraton Yogyakarta, Taman Sari, the Golong Gilig Monument, the Masjid Gedhe Kauman (the royal mosque), the Loji Kecil (now the Presidential Palace of Yogyakarta), as well as several other important buildings within the Yogyakarta Sultanate.

During the reign of Hamengkubuwana V, Raden Mas Mustojo was a strong opponent of the Sultan’s cooperative political stance toward the colonial government of the Dutch East Indies under the Kingdom of the Netherlands. However, after Hamengkubuwana V’s death and his own coronation, Hamengkubuwana VI continued a cooperative policy, though with less compliance than his predecessor.

Throughout the reign of Hamengkubuwana VI, diplomatic relations were established with various kingdoms, particularly after his marriage to a princess of the Brunei Sultanate. Although several disputes arose with other kingdoms, Sultan Hamengkubuwana VI was recorded as resolving them with prudence and wisdom. Nevertheless, relations with the Dutch East Indies government gradually deteriorated, especially because the Yogyakarta court maintained close ties with kingdoms considered hostile by the Dutch colonial authorities.

The reign of Hamengkubuwana VI ended with his death on 20 July 1877. He was succeeded by his eldest son, GRM Murteja, who ascended the throne as Sultan Hamengkubuwana VII.

The accession of Hamengkubuwana VII was met with dissatisfaction from the consort of the late Hamengkubuwana V, GKR Sekar Kedhaton, and GRM Timur Muhammad. They argued that GRM Timur Muhammad (the son of Hamengkubuwana V) was more entitled to inherit the throne. Both were subsequently arrested on charges of rebellion against the Sultan and the palace. GKR Sekar Kedhaton and GRM Timur Muhammad were exiled to Manado, North Sulawesi, where both later died.

== Personal life ==
During his ascension, he only had a queen consort, Gusti Kanjeng Ratu Kencana, a daughter of Pakubuwana VIII of Surakarta, and mother of a daughter, Raden Ajeng Gusti Sekar Kedhaton, who died young.

In 1872, he installed a new queen consort, Gusti Kanjeng Ratu Sultan, and appointed his eldest son, Gusti Raden Mas Murtejo as the crown prince. The crown prince was biologically born to Ratu Sultan before his father's first marriage perhaps since she was a concubine, so that he was possibly adopted by Ratu Kencana. Later on, Ratu Kencana was known as Ratu Hamengkubuwana and Ratu Sultan was Ratu Hageng.

== Family ==
- Gusti Kanjeng Ratu Kencana (born Raden Ajeng Dablêg), a princess of Surakarta. She was a daughter of Pakubuwana VIII, later Gusti Kanjeng Ratu Hamengkubuwana
  - Raden Ajeng Gusti Sekar Kedhaton
- Gusti Kanjeng Ratu Sultan, later the Gusti Kanjeng Ratu Hageng (Queen Dowager)
  - Gusti Raden Mas Murteja, titled Kanjeng Pangeran Hangabehi, then appointed as the Kanjeng Gusti Pangeran Adipati Anom Hamengkunegara (Crown Prince) of Yogyakarta, succeeded as Hamengkubuwana VIII
  - Gusti Kanjeng Ratu Pembayun
    - Married Kanjeng Raden Adipati Danureja V

== Notes ==
Regnal titles
Preceded by Hamengkubuwono V	Sultan of Yogyakarta; 1855–1877	Succeeded by Hamengkubuwono VII
