= Hamengkubuwono VII =

Sultan of Yogyakarta from 1877 to 1921

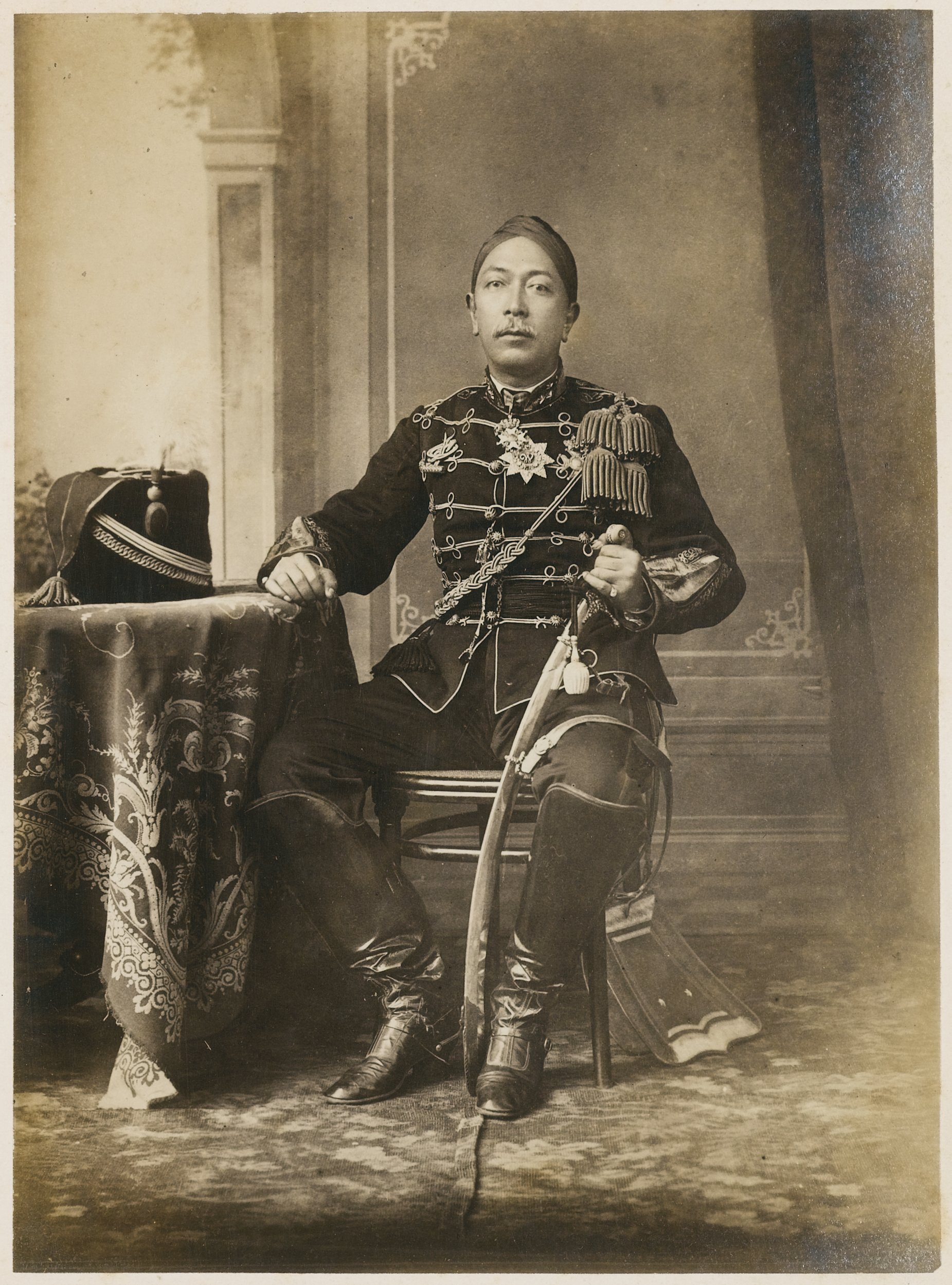
- Hamengkubuwana VII, 1885

7th Sultan of Yogyakarta
- Reign: 22 December 1877 – 29 January 1921
- Predecessor: Hamengkubuwono VI
- Successor: Hamengkubuwono VIII
- Born: Gusti Raden Mas Murteja; 4 February 1839; Kraton Yogyakarta
- Died: 30 December 1921 (aged 82); Royal Ambarrukmo, Yogyakarta
- Burial: Saptarengga Mausoleum, Pajimatan Imogiri Tombs
- Spouses: Gusti Kanjeng Ratu Wandhan (m. 1868) Gusti Kanjeng Ratu Hemas (died 1892) Gusti Kanjeng Ratu Kencana
- Issue: Hamengkubuwana VIII
Regnal name
- Ngarsa Dalem Sampeyan Dalem Ingkang Sinuwun Kanjeng Sultan Hamengkubuwana Senapati-ing-Ngalaga 'Abdurrahman Sayyidin Panatagama Khalifatullah ingkang Jumeneng Kaping Pitu ing Ngayogyakarta Hadiningrat
- House: Mataram
- Father: Hamengkubuwono VI
- Mother: Gusti Kanjeng Ratu Sultan

Hamengkubuwono VII (also spelled Hamengkubuwana VII, 4 February 1839 – 30 December 1921) was the seventh sultan of Yogyakarta, reigning from 22 December 1877 until his abdication in 29 January 1921.

His residence after the abdication of the crown in the early 19th Century is now known as the Museum Ambarrukmo, part of the Royal Ambarrukmo Yogyakarta hotel complex.

== Early life ==
His birth name was Gusti Raden Mas Murteja, the eldest son of Sultan Sri Sultan Hamengkubuwana VI, born on 4 February 1839. He ascended the throne, succeeding his father, on 13 August 1877.

GRM Murteja was the son of Gusti Kangjeng Ratu (GKR) Sultan, the second consort of Hamengkubuwana VI. The first consort, GKR Hamengkubuwana, a daughter of Pakubuwana VIII of Surakarta, did not have any male children. Following the death of Hamengkubuwana VI, GRM Murteja ascended the throne as Sultan Hamengkubuwana VII.

== Reign ==
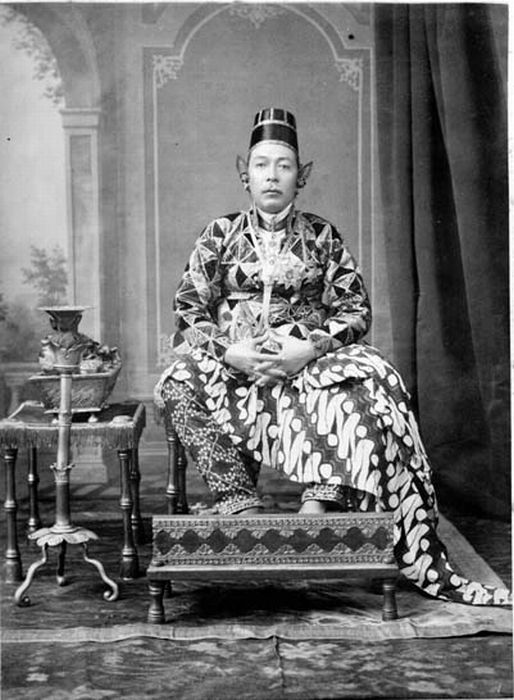
Portrait of Hamengkubuwana VII

During the reign of Hamengkubuwana VII, numerous sugar factories were established in Yogyakarta, totaling 17 in number. Each factory establishment provided him with the opportunity to receive funds amounting to f 200,000.00 (f = florin, the Dutch currency). This greatly increased the Sultan's wealth, earning him the epithet Sultan Sugih (the Wealthy Sultan). Hamengkubuwana VII was one of the longest-reigning Sultans of Yogyakarta, ruling for 44 years. In 1921, at the age of 82, he decided to abdicate the throne and died not long afterward in the same year.

His reign also marked a transitional period toward modernization in Yogyakarta. Many modern schools were established, and he even sent his sons to pursue education in the Netherlands. The implementation of liberal economic policies from 1870 provided additional benefits to the Sultan through the introduction of a 70-year land lease rights system. To support sugar transportation, railway networks and sugarcane tram lines were constructed, initiated by the Nederlandsch-Indische Spoorweg Maatschappij (NIS), a Dutch railway company. These railway lines also generated financial benefits for the royal court.

On 29 January 1921, Hamengkubuwana VII, then aged 81, decided to abdicate the throne and appointed his fourth crown prince (Gusti Raden Mas Sujadi, titled Gusti Pangeran Harya Purbaya) as his successor. The legitimacy of this succession has been questioned, as the first crown prince (Gusti Raden Mas Akhaddiyat, titled Kangjeng Gusti Pangeran Adipati Anom Hamengkunegara I), who should have succeeded him, died suddenly under circumstances that remain unclear. His replacement, Kangjeng Gusti Pangeran Adipati Anom Hamengkunegara II (later titled Kangjeng Gusti Pangeran Juminah, the grandfather of Indonesian artist Bagong Kussudiardja), was dismissed due to health reasons. The third crown prince, Gusti Raden Mas Putro (titled Kangjeng Gusti Pangeran Adipati Anom Hamengkunegara III), died on 21 February 1913 after a severe illness following his return from Kulon Progo.

It has been alleged that the Dutch authorities were involved, as they opposed the succession of a crown prince known for resisting regulations imposed by the colonial government in Batavia.

Traditionally, succession occurred only after the reigning king's death. In this case, however, the accession of Hamengkubuwana VIII took place while Hamengkubuwana VII was still alive. According to some accounts, the former Sultan was exiled by his fourth son to Ngambarrukmo Palace outside the Yogyakarta Kraton.

Hamengkubuwana VII accepted his son's decision with magnanimity (in Javanese tradition referred to as mikul dhuwur mendhem jero), as his son had politically consolidated power within the royal administration. After his abdication, Hamengkubuwana VII reportedly stated, "No king has ever died in the kraton after me," a claim that remains debated. To date, two subsequent rulers died outside the palace: Hamengkubuwana VIII (who died after retrieving the crown prince, Gusti Raden Mas Dorodjatun, from Batavia) and Hamengkubuwana IX (who died in the United States). Among the Javanese, it is considered an honor to die in one's own home.

Another version states that Hamengkubuwana VII requested retirement approval from the Dutch to madeg pandita (become a hermit) at Ngambarrukmo Palace.

=== Cultural and educational development ===
The era of Hamengkubuwana VII marked the early phase of modernization, during which many schools were established. He encouraged higher education for his children, including sending several of them to study in the Netherlands. In the field of dance, Hamengkubuwana VII supported artistic development beyond the palace walls, encouraging his children to establish a Yogyakarta-style dance school, Kridha Beksa Wirama, which was open to the public at Dalem Tejakusuman. In addition to founding schools, he also strengthened dance and wayang performances, which grew increasingly popular from late 1918 onward.

During his reign, various mass organizations also emerged. Muhammadiyah, one of Indonesia's largest Islamic organizations, originated within the kraton milieu during this period. Initiated by Raden Ngabehi Ngabdul Darwis, also known as Kyai Haji Ahmad Dahlan, a palace official who had studied in Saudi Arabia, Muhammadiyah focused on social welfare and education and developed from the Kauman area.

Hamengkubuwana VII envisioned encouraging public participation in political organizations as a foundation for Indonesia's future. The Loji Mataram building owned by the kraton on Malioboro Street, now the building of the Regional House of Representatives of Yogyakarta (DPRD DIY), was lent to Budi Utomo for its first congress. He also facilitated the celebration of Islamic holy days according to the Hijri calendar, while the Garebeg ceremonies continued to follow the Sultan Agungan calendar.

=== Abdication ===
Approaching the age of 81, Hamengkubuwana VII felt it was time to abdicate the throne. In 1920, he conveyed this intention to Danureja VII and the Dutch East Indies government, choosing to live as a pandhita at Ambarukmo. This decision was influenced by Dutch proposals for agrarian reorganization, which he believed would restrict his authority, particularly through the abolition of the apanage system that transferred land administration to the colonial government via regional treasuries. Politically, these regulations effectively reduced the Sultan to a component of the colonial administration. Hamengkubuwana VII subsequently appointed GRM Sujadi as his successor to ensure a smooth succession and political stability under continued Dutch influence.

=== Legacy ===
Beyond sugar factories, railway networks, and Pesanggrahan Ambarukmo, the legacy of Hamengkubuwana VII includes artistic works such as the dances Bedaya Sumreg, Srimpi Dhendhang Sumbawa, and Bedaya Lala. During his reign, Bedaya dance costumes transitioned to the mekak style while retaining paes ageng makeup. In the field of kris craftsmanship, he was known for his high-quality collection of tangguh kaping piton krises.

During the reign of Hamengkubuwana VII, the Golong Gilig Monument, which had been damaged by the earthquake of 1867, was renovated under the supervision of Patih Danureja V, based on a design by YPF van Brussel. The monument, which has become an icon of Yogyakarta, was inaugurated on 3 October 1889. Hamengkubuwana VII died on 30 December 1921 (29 Rabingulakir 1851) and was buried at Astana Saptorenggo, Pajimatan Imogiri.

== Gallery ==
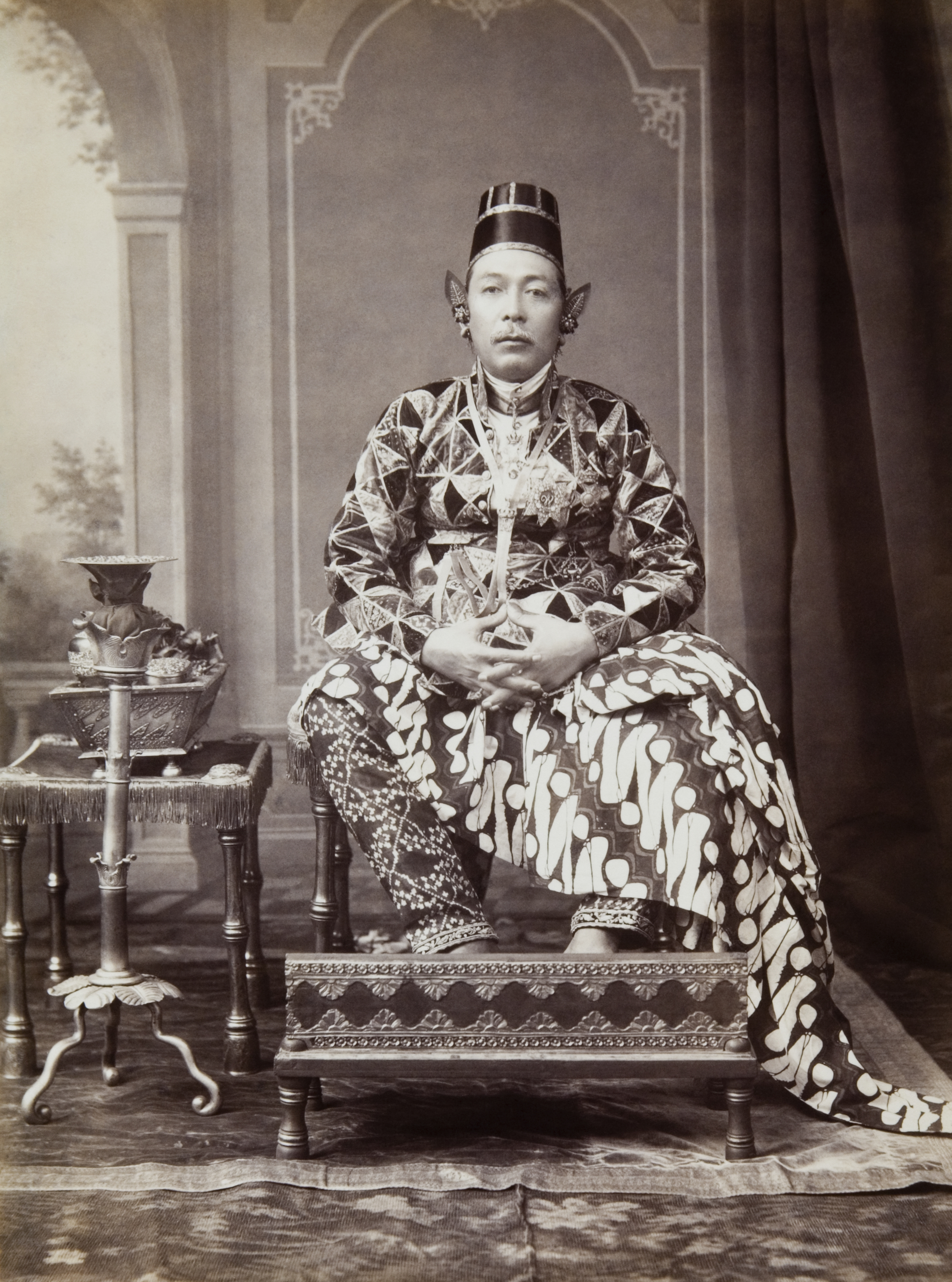
Hamengkubuwana VII

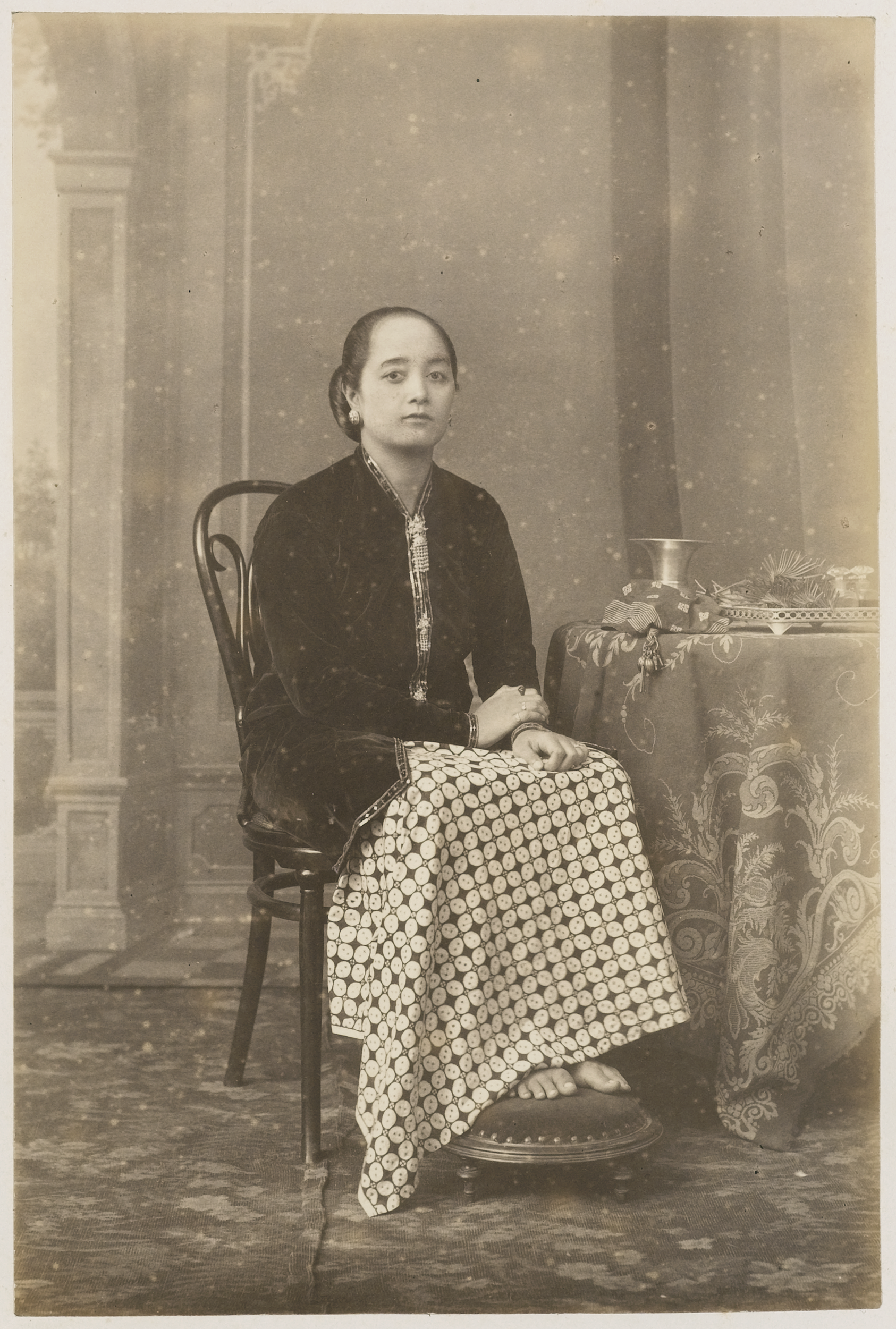
Ratu Angger, sister of Hamengkoe Buwono VII sultan of Yogyakarta in court dress around 1885

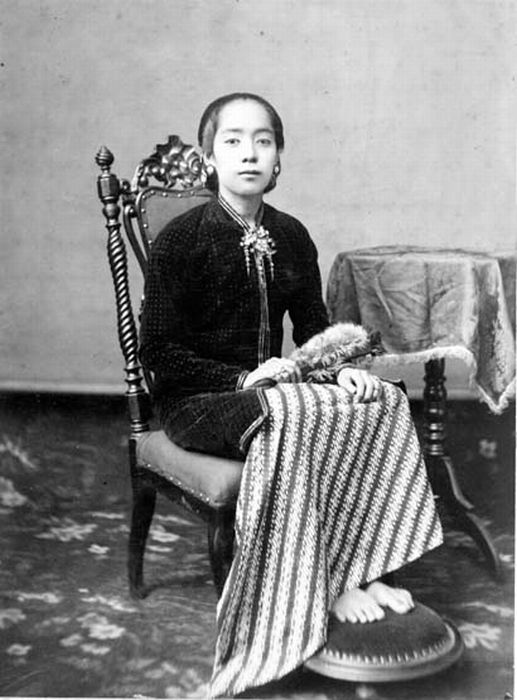
Ratoe Madoeretna, daughter of Sultan Hamengkubuwono VII

== Family ==
He had three queen consorts. The first one was Gusti Kanjeng Ratu Kencana, daughter of Sentot Prawirodirdjo whom he had married before his ascension; and titled Gusti Kanjeng Ratu Kencana upon his ascension. Another source identified her as Gusti Kanjeng Ratu Sultan and suggested she had previously been married Paku Alam IV. Not long after, he raised his concubine to the second queen by the title of Gusti Kanjeng Ratu Hemas. She was a daughter of Kanjeng Raden Tumenggung Jayadipura who was also known as Gusti Kanjeng Ratu Hageng or Gusti Kanjeng Tegalrejo.

As Ratu Kencana hadn't yet produced any male children by the time the second queen already had four princes, she gambled. She planned to make one of her daughter as the future queen consort, so that the next monarch would be her grandson. In 1883, she supported the widow of Hamengkubuwana V, Gusti Kanjeng Ratu Sekar Kedhaton's coup d'etat, aimed to proclaimed the late Sultan's son, Gusti Pangeran Harya Suryaning Ngalaga, as the rightful heir. The action failed, her title revoked, exiled, and renamed as Gusti Kanjeng Ratu Wandhan.

Gusti Kanjeng Ratu Hemas died in 1892. Later, a concubine named Kanjeng Bendara Raden Ayu Rêtna Sri Wulan, daughter of Bendara Pangeran Harya Hadinegara, son of Hamengkubuwana II was elevated to the third queen consort by the title of Gusti Kanjeng Ratu Kencana.

One of his concubines, Bendara Raden Ayu Rêtna Mandaya, was a daughter of Kanjeng Raden Adipati Danureja VI.

His wives and several notable children were listed below.

Queen consorts

- Gusti Kanjeng Ratu Wandhan
  - Gusti Kanjeng Ratu Candrakirana
  - Gusti Kanjeng Ratu Sekar Kedhaton, changed to Gusti Kanjeng Ratu Madurêtna
    - Married Raden Tumenggung Kertanegara
- Gusti Kanjeng Ratu Hemas (died 1892)
  - Gusti Raden Ajeng Murkatijah, titled Gusti Kanjeng Ratu Sekar Kedhaton
  - Gusti Raden Mas Akadiyat (1874 - 1893), appointed as the Kanjeng Gusti Pangeran Adipati Anom Hamengkunegara (Crown Prince) of Yogyakarta in 1883
  - Gusti Kanjeng Ratu Hangger
    - Married Bendara Raden Mas Abimanyu, titled Bendara Kanjeng Pangeran Harya Kusumayuda, second son of Pakubuwana X
  - Gusti Raden Mas Pratistha (1877 - 1942), appointed as the Kanjeng Gusti Pangeran Adipati Anom Hamengkunegara (Crown Prince) of Yogyakarta in 1893, degraded to Kanjeng Gusti Pangeran Adipati Juminah
  - Gusti Raden Mas Putra (1879 - 1913), appointed as the Kanjeng Gusti Pangeran Adipati Anom Hamengkunegara (Crown Prince) of Yogyakarta
    - Married Bendara Raden Ajeng Siti Katinah, daughter of Kanjeng Gusti Pangeran Adipati Mangkubumi
  - Gusti Raden Mas Sujadi (1880 - 1939), titled Gusti Pangeran Harya Purbaya, appointed as the Kanjeng Gusti Pangeran Adipati Anom (Crown Prince) of Yogyakarta, succeeded as Hamengkubuwana VIII
  - Gusti Kanjeng Ratu Hayu
    - Married Kanjeng Pangeran Harya Adipati Danureja VII
- Gusti Kanjeng Ratu Kencana, first cousin three times removed of the Sultan. She was a granddaughter of Hamengkubuwana II.
  - Gusti Pangeran Harya Mangkukusuma
  - Gusti Kanjeng Ratu Bendara
    - Married Kanjeng Pangeran Harya Suryadi
  - Gusti Pangeran Harya Tejakusuma
  - Gusti Pangeran Harya Natapraja
  - Gusti Raden Mas Suhardi
  - Gusti Kanjeng Ratu Dewi
    - Married Kanjeng Raden Tumenggung Wijil
  - Gusti Raden Ajeng Murkamsilah
  - Gusti Kanjeng Ratu Bendara
  - Gusti Kanjeng Ratu Candrakirana
    - Married Kanjeng Pangeran Harya Adipati Danureja VIII
  - Gusti Pangeran Harya Hadikusuma
  - Gusti Raden Ajeng Mursudarinah (1895 - 1944), titled Gusti Kanjeng Ratu Hemas
    - Married Pakubuwana X of Surakarta
  - Gusti Raden Ajeng Mursudariyah (1896 - ), titled Gusti Kanjeng Ratu Timur
    - Married Kanjeng Gusti Pangeran Adipati Arya Mangkunegara VII
  - Gusti Raden Mas Suatmaji
  - Gusti Raden Ajeng Murbilanatirin

Concubines

- Kanjeng Bendara Raden Ayu Rêtna Purnama
- Bendara Raden Ayu Rêtna Setyaasmara
- Bendara Raden Ayu Rêtnaningdyah
- Bendara Raden Ayu Rêtnaningsih
  - Kanjeng Gusti Pangeran Adipati Hangabehi
- Bendara Raden Ayu Rêtnadi
- Bendara Raden Ayu Rêtnasangdyah
  - Bendara Pangeran Harya Hadinegara
- Bendara Raden Ayu Rêtna Juwita
  - Bendara Pangeran Harya Suryadiningrat
- Bendara Raden Ayu Dewarêtna
- Bendara Raden Ayu Rêtna Murcita
- Bendara Raden Ayu Pujarêtna
- Bendara Raden Ayu Rêtna Wihardi
- Bendara Raden Ayu Rêtna Mandaya
  - Bendara Raden Mas Kudiarmadji, titled Bendara Pangeran Harya Surya Mataram, widely known as Ki Ageng Surya Mataram
- Bendara Raden Ayu Rêngga Rêtnaasmara
- Bendara Raden Ayu Rêtnaliring Asmara
  - Bendara Raden Ajeng Muryalitarina
    - Married Bendara Raden Mas Sujana, titled Bendara Kanjeng Pangeran Harya Purbanegara, son of Pakubuwana X
- Raden Rêtnadewati
- Mas Ajeng Rêtna Murcita
- Mas Ayu Rêtna Jumanten
- Raden Ajeng Cênthung

== See also ==
- Hamengkubuwana

== Notes ==
Regnal titles
| Preceded by Hamengkubuwono VI | Sultan of Yogyakarta; 1877–1921 | Succeeded by Hamengkubuwono VIII |
