= Plengkung Gading =

Plengkung Nirbaya, the southern gate of the Palace of the Sultan of Yogyakarta - Around AD 1900

Plengkung Gading, also known as Plengkung Nirbaya, is a historic gate forming part of the defensive walls (Baluwarti) of the Yogyakarta Palace complex in Yogyakarta, Indonesia. It is located south of the Southern Alun-Alun (Alun-Alun Kidul), along Jalan Gading, in Panembahan, Kraton District, Yogyakarta City.

Plengkung Gading is one of five arched gates that provide access to and from the walled compound of the palace. The structure has historical and philosophical significance in the traditions of the Yogyakarta Sultanate, particularly because it is associated with the funeral procession of deceased sultans on their way to the royal cemetery complex at Imogiri, Bantul Regency.

== History ==
=== Construction ===
The construction of Plengkung Gading was associated with the establishment of the Yogyakarta Palace following the signing of the Treaty of Giyanti in 1755. The treaty divided the territory of the Mataram Sultanate into two political entities: the Surakarta Sunanate and the Yogyakarta Sultanate. Sultan Hamengkubuwono I subsequently established the Yogyakarta Palace as the administrative centre of the newly established sultanate.

The palace complex was constructed with a defensive system consisting of walls surrounding the royal compound. Several arched gates, locally known as plengkung, were built along these walls. The gates served as passageways connecting the area inside the defensive walls with the surrounding settlements.

Plengkung Nirbaya is situated on the southern side of the palace's defensive walls. The gate was constructed during the reign of Sultan Hamengkubuwono I (1755–1792) as part of the defensive system and spatial layout of the Yogyakarta Palace.

=== Etymology ===
The original name of the structure is Plengkung Nirbaya. The term nirbaya is derived from two words: nir, meaning "without", and baya, meaning "danger". The name can therefore be interpreted as "free from danger" or "without threat". The name Plengkung Gading is more widely used by the local community because the structure is located in the Jalan Gading area. The name is also associated with the gate's white colour, which resembles the colour of ivory. Both names refer to the same structure.
