= Hamengkubuwono IV =

Sultan of Yogyakarta from 1814 to 1823

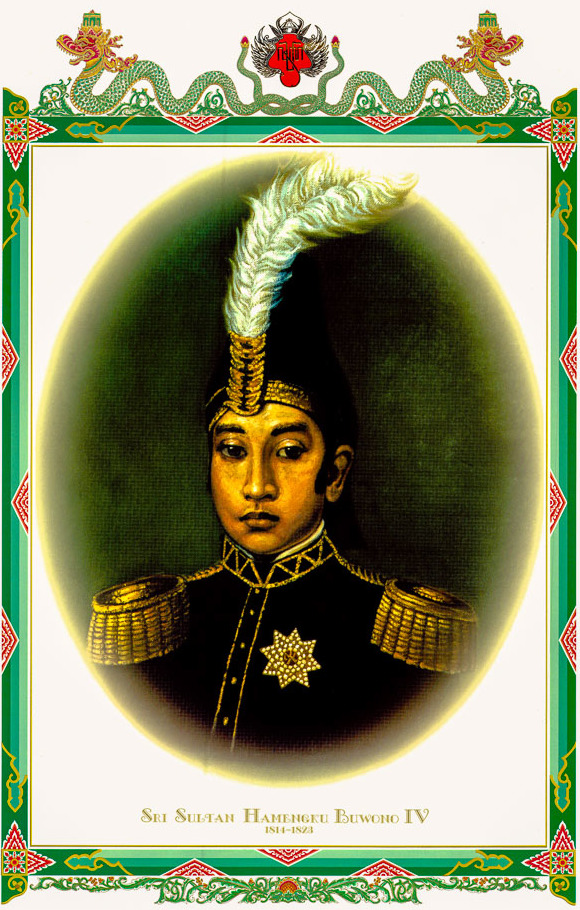

Sultan of Yogyakarta
- Reign: 9 November 1814 – 6 December 1823
- Predecessor: Hamengkubuwono III
- Successor: Hamengkubuwono V
- Born: Gusti Raden Mas Ibnu Jarot; 3 April 1804
- Died: 6 December 1823 (aged 19)
- Burial: Astana Besiyaran Pajimatan, Imogiri, Yogyakarta
- Spouse: Gusti Kanjeng Ratu Kencana (m. 1816)
- Issue: Hamengkubuwana V Hamengkubuwana VI
Posthumous name
- Sultan Seda Besiyar
- House: Mataram
- Father: Hamengkubuwono III
- Mother: Gusti Kanjeng Ratu Hageng

Hamengkubuwono IV, also spelled Hamengkubuwana IV (Yogyakarta, 3 April 1804 – Yogyakarta, 6 December 1823) was the fourth sultan of Yogyakarta, Indonesia, reigning from 1814 to 1823.

== Reign ==
Born as Gusti Raden Mas Ibnu Jarot, he was the 18th son of Hamengkubuwono III, born from his queen consort, Gusti Kanjeng Ratu Kencono. He was the younger half brother of Prince Diponegoro. He succeeded his father when he was 10 years old. Due to his young age, Paku Alam I was appointed as his regent.

His reign was a period of political deterioration that ultimately led up to the Java War. In his era, Patih Danureja IV acted violently and arbitrarily. He put his relatives in many courts' important positions. This pro-Dutch Danurejan family also supported the implementation of land rent system for private entrepreneurs, which inflicted a loss upon the poor subjects.

On 20 January 1820, Paku Alam I gave up his position as sultan's regent. Hamengkubuwono IV's independent rule only lasted 2 years due to his sudden death on 6 December 1823, when he was on vacation, hence his posthumous title, Sinuhun Jarot, Seda Besiyar.

Upon his premature death, rumours circulated that he had been poisoned. His three-year-old son, Hamengkubuwono V, ascended the throne amid controversy over who would act as regent. Hamengkubuwono V was later succeeded by his brother, styled Hamengkubuwono VI.

== Family ==
In total, Hamengkubuwono IV had 1 queen consort, 8 concubines, and 13 children.

His only queen consort was Gusti Kanjeng Ratu Kencana later also known as GKR. Hageng (born 1802), daughter of Patih Danureja II and Gusti Kanjeng Ratu Hangger, daughter of Hamengkubuwono II, and had issues:

1. Kanjeng Gusti Pangeran Adipati Anom Hamengkunegara Sudibya Rajaputra Narendra ing Mataram (September – December 1817)
  bestowed the title of crown prince, died as an infant
2. Gusti Raden Mas Gatot Menol (later Hamengkubuwono V)
3. Gusti Raden Mas Mustaja (later Hamengkubuwono VI)
4. Gusti Kanjeng Ratu Sekar Kedhaton (born 1822), died young.

His concubines included:

1. Bendara Raden Ayu Dewaningrum, and had issues:
  1. Bendara Raden Mas Tritustha, died young.
  2. Bendara Raden Mas Sunadi, died young.
  3. 2 other sons who died in childhood.
2. Bendara Raden Ayu Murcitaningrum, and had issues:
  1. Gusti Bendara Raden Ayu Maduratna, married to Kanjeng Pangeran Harya Yudhanegara I alias Kanjeng Raden Tumenggung Prawiradirja.
3. Bendara Raden Ayu Ratna Adiningrum, and had issue:
  1. Bendara Raden Ayu Danureja, married with Kanjeng Raden Tumenggung Gandakusuma/Kanjeng Raden Adipati Danureja IV.
4. Bendara Raden Ayu Turunish, and had issue:
  1. Bendara Raden Ayu Nitinegara, married with Kanjeng Raden Tumenggung Nitinegara II, son of Kanjeng Raden Tumenggung Nitinegara I (a son-in-law of Hamengkubuwono II).
5. Bendara Raden Ayu Daya Asmara, and had issue:
  1. Bendara Pangeran Harya Panengah/Hangabehi/Suryadiningrat, a KNIL officer.
6. Bendara Raden Ayu Murtiningrum, widow of his father, Hamengkubuwono III, and had issues:
  1. Bendara Raden Ayu Jayaningrat
  2. Bendara Raden Ajeng Mutoinah.
7. Bendara Raden Ayu Ratnaningrum, and had issues:
  1. Bendara Raden Ayu Suryaatmaja
  2. Bendara Raden Mas Samadikun
8. Bendara Raden Ayu Widyawati, daughter of Kyai Dalang Jiwatenaya, a wayang kulit puppeteer, and had issues:
  1. Bendara Pangeran Harya Mlayakusuma/Suryanegara (1822–1886), a KNIL officer and Javanese poet.
  2. Bendara Raden Mas Pirngadi, died young.

== Ancestry ==
Ancestors of Hamengkubuwono IV

Hamengkubuwana I
Hamengkubuwana II
Gusti Kanjeng Ratu Kadipaten
Hamengkubuwana III
Kanjeng Raden Tumenggung Purwadiningrat
Gusti Kanjeng Ratu Kedhaton
Hamengkubuwana IV
Kanjeng Raden Tumenggung Sasranegara I
Kanjeng Raden Tumenggung Sasradiningrat I
Gusti Kanjeng Ratu Kencana
Hamengkubuwana I
Bendara Raden Ayu Sasradiningrat

== Literature ==
- Purwadi. 2007. Sejarah Raja-Raja Jawa. Yogyakarta: Media Ilmu.

Regnal titles
Preceded by Hamengkubuwono III	Sultan of Yogyakarta; 1814–1822	Succeeded by Hamengkubuwono V
