= Yogyakarta Sultanate =

Javanese monarchy in Yogyakarta Special Region, Indonesia

Sultanate of Ngayogyakarta Hadiningrat
ꦏꦱꦸꦭ꧀ꦠꦤ꧀ꦤꦤ꧀ꦔꦪꦺꦴꦒꦾꦏꦂꦡꦲꦢꦶꦤꦶꦔꦿꦠ꧀
Transliteration of name
- - Javanese in Latin: Kasultanan Ngayogyakarta Hadiningrat
  - Pegon Jawa: كاسلطانان ڠايَوڮياكارتا هادينيڠرات
  - Indonesian: Kesultanan Yogyakarta
- Royal Flag (Gula Klapa) Royal coat of arms (Praja Cihna)
- Royal anthem: Gendhing Monggang (Note: Played when the Sultan enters and leaves a ceremony and a gamelan orchestra is present. Example:) and Gendhing Surceli (Note: Played when the Sultan enters and leaves a ceremony and a gamelan orchestra is not present. Examples:)
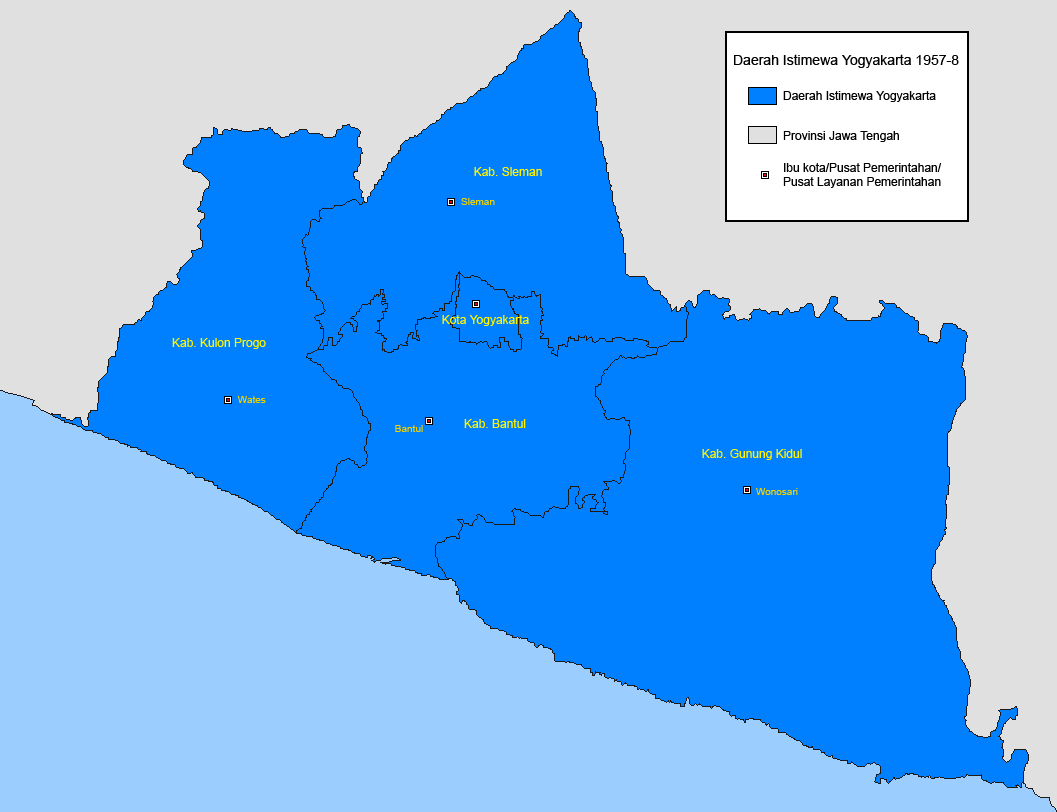
- The realm of Yogyakarta Sultanate
- Capital: Yogyakarta
- Official language: Javanese
- Recognised language: Dutch (1755–1811; 1816–1942); English (1811–1816); Japanese (1942–1945); Indonesian (1945–present)
- Religion: Sunni Islam (official); Kejawen
- Government: Absolute monarchy (until 1945); Devolved semi-constitutional monarchy within a unitary presidential republic (from 1945)
- Sultan
  - 1755–1792: Hamengkubuwana I
  - 1940–1988: Hamengkubuwana IX
  - 1989–present: Hamengkubuwana X
- Pepatih Dalem
  - 1755–1799 (first): KRA. Danureja I
  - 1933–1945 (last): KPHA. Danureja VIII
- Legislature: None
- History
  - Treaty of Giyanti: 13 February 1755
  - Status downgrade: 3 August 1950
- Website www.kratonjogja.id
Preceded by	Succeeded by
Mataram Sultanate; Surakarta Sunanate	Special Region of Yogyakarta
- Today part of: Indonesia; Special Region of Yogyakarta
- Political Status: De facto independent state (1755–1800); De jure protectorate state of the Dutch East India Company (1755–1799); Protectorate state of the Batavian Republic within Dutch East Indies (1800-1806); Protectorate state of the British East India Company (1811–1816); Protectorate state of the Kingdom of the Netherlands within Dutch East Indies (1806-1811; 1816-1942); Protectorate state of the Empire of Japan (1942–1945); Protectorate state with special region status of the Republic of Indonesia (1945–1950); Province-level special region status within Republic of Indonesia (1950–2012); Private cultural institution with landlord rights, co-existing with the Government of the Special Region of Yogyakarta Province (2012–present); Others: In some areas was established the Duchy of Pakualaman at 1813

Sultan of Yogyakarta
- Kasultanan Ngayogyakarta Hadiningrat ꦏꦱꦸꦭ꧀ꦠꦤ꧀ꦤꦤ꧀ꦔꦪꦺꦴꦒꦾꦏꦂꦡꦲꦢꦶꦤꦶꦔꦿꦠ꧀
- Provincial
- Royal coat of arms

Incumbent
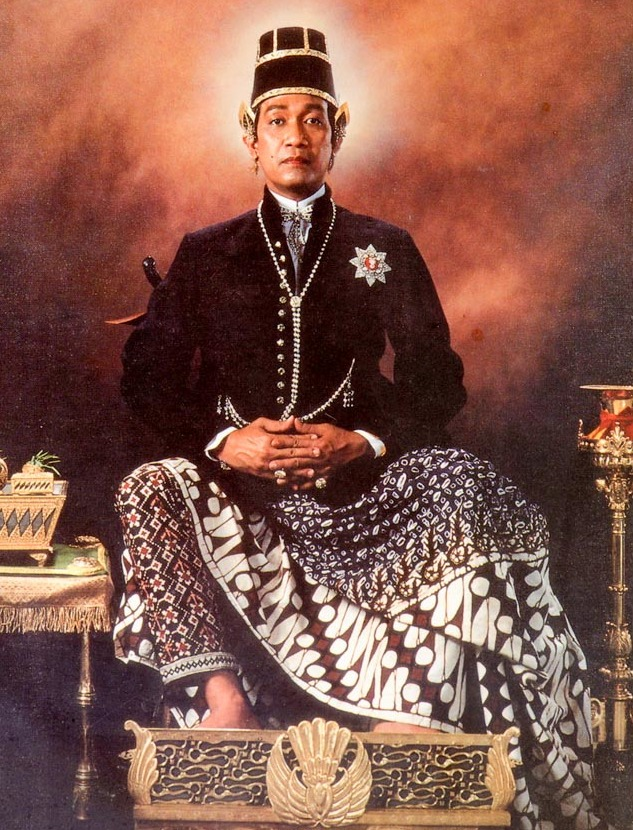
- Hamengkubuwono X since 7 March 1989
- Sultan of Yogyakarta

Details
- Style: His Majesty (Note: Javanese: Ngarsa Dalem)
- Heir presumptive: Princess Mangkubumi
- First monarch: Sultan Hamengkubuwono I
- Formed: 1755
- Residence: The Royal Palace of Yogyakarta
- Appointer: Hereditary

The Sultanate of Yogyakarta, officially the Sultanate of Ngayogyakarta Hadiningrat (Javanese: ꦏꦱꦸꦭ꧀ꦠꦤ꧀ꦤꦤ꧀ꦔꦪꦺꦴꦒꦾꦏꦂꦡꦲꦢꦶꦤꦶꦔꦿꦠ꧀, romanized: Kasultanan Ngayogyakarta Hadiningrat Javanese pronunciation: [ŋajogjɔkartɔ hadinɪŋrat]; Indonesian: Kesultanan Yogyakarta), is a Javanese monarchy in Yogyakarta Special Region, in the Republic of Indonesia. The current head of the sultanate is Hamengkubuwono X.

Yogyakarta existed as a state since 1755 on the territory of modern Indonesia in the central part of Java Island. The sultanate became the main theatre of military operations during the Java War of 1825–1830, following which a significant part of its territory was annexed by the Dutch, and the degree of autonomy was significantly curtailed. In 1946–1948, during The Indonesian war of independence, the capital of the republic was transferred to the territory of the sultanate, in the city of Yogyakarta.

In 1950, Yogyakarta, along with the Principality of Pakualaman, became part of Indonesia, with the former royal realms united as a Special Region, with status equal to that of a national province. At the same time, the hereditary titles of Sultan of Yogyakarta and Prince of Pakualaman, with ceremonial privileges carried with the titles, were legally secured for the rulers. In 2012, the Indonesian government secured Act No. 13 of 2012 which formally recognised the reigning sultan of Yogyakarta as the hereditary governor of the Special Region of Yogyakarta, with the Pakualam Prince as its hereditary vice-governor (article 18, paragraph 1c). That act also formally incorporated the sultanate as a corporation sole with the privilege of land ownership, therefore restoring the sultanate's right to own crown land (which it originally rescinded in the 1980s); as of 2019, the sultanate is claimed to own almost 10% of land in the Special Region of Yogyakarta.

== Geography ==
The sultanate is located on the southern coast of the island of Java. In the south, it is bordered by the Indian Ocean, with land surrounded by the province of Central Java. The area is 3,133 km^{2}, while the population in 2010 was about 3.5 million people. The special district of Yogyakarta, along with Jakarta, has the largest population density among the provinces of Indonesia.

Not far from the city of Yogyakarta is the volcano Merapi, the most active volcano in Indonesia which has erupted regularly since 1548, resulting in great damage to the population of the district. In October–November 2010, there was a strong volcanic eruption, forcing about a 100,000 people to temporarily leave their homes.

== History ==
After the death of Sultan Agung in 1645, the Sultanate of Mataram went into decline due to a power struggle within the sultanate itself. The Dutch East India Company also exploited the power struggle to increase its control. At the peak of the conflict, the Mataram Sultanate was split into two based on the Treaty of Giyanti of 13 February 1755: Yogyakarta Sultanate and Surakarta Sunanate.

The Giyanti Treaty mentioned Pangeran Mangkubumi as Sultan of Yogyakarta with the title of

ꦔꦂꦱꦢꦊꦩ꧀ꦱꦩ꧀ꦥꦺꦪꦤ꧀ꦢꦊꦩ꧀ꦲꦶꦁꦏꦁꦱꦶꦤꦸꦮꦸꦤꦏꦁꦗꦼꦁꦱꦸꦭ꧀ꦠꦤ꧀ꦲꦩꦼꦁꦏꦸꦨꦸꦮꦤꦱꦺꦤꦥꦠꦶꦲꦶꦁꦔꦭꦒꦔꦧ꧀ꦢꦸꦭ꧀ꦫꦏ꦳꧀ꦩꦤ꧀ꦱꦪꦶꦢꦶꦤ꧀ꦥꦤꦠꦒꦩꦏ꦳ꦭꦶꦥ꦳ꦠꦸꦭ꧀ꦭꦃ Ngarsa Dalem Sampeyan Dalem Ingkang Sinuwun Kangjeng Sultan Hamengkubuwana Senopati-ing-Ngalaga Ngabdulrakhman Sayyidin Panatagama Khalifatullah (Note: Correct order of the title according to 2012 Indonesian Act No. 13 on the Uniqueness of Special Region of Yogyakarta, Article 1 No. 4)

Which translates as

His Highness the Sultan, Commander in the Battlefield, Servant of the Most Gracious, Cleric and Caliph that Safeguards the Religion (Note: Khalifatullah literally means Caliph of Allah)

As the result of further colonial intervention within the ruling family of the former Mataram Sultanate, the area which today is the Special Region of Yogyakarta was divided into the Sultanate of Yogyakarta (Kasultanan Yogyakarta) and the Principality of Pakualam (Kadipaten Pakualaman).

The Dutch colonial government arranged for the carrying out of autonomous self-government, arranged under a political contract. When Indonesian independence was proclaimed, the rulers, the sultan of Yogyakarta and the Prince of Pakualaman made a declaration supporting the newly founded Republic of Indonesia, and they would unite with the Republic. After the republic's independence was formally recognised internationally, the former royal realms were formally unified on 3 August 1950 into the Yogyakarta Special Region, with the sultan of Yogyakarta becoming the hereditary governor of the Yogyakarta Special Region and the Prince of Pakualaman becoming the hereditary vice governor of the Yogyakarta Special Region, formally on 30 August 2012 (article 18, paragraph 1c); both are responsible to the president of Indonesia.

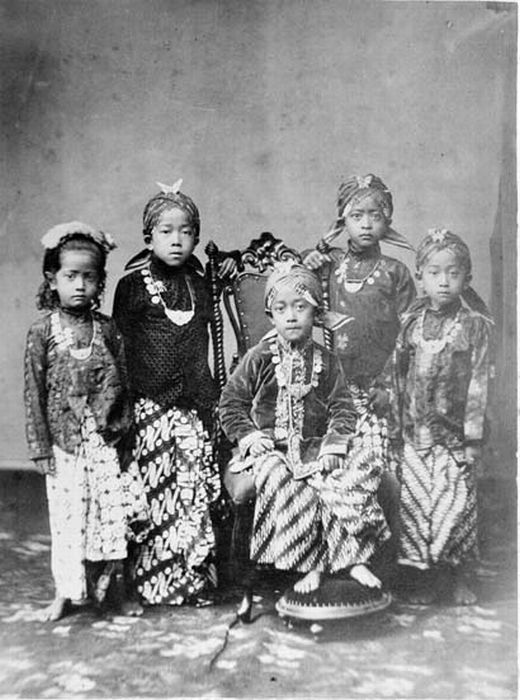
Princes and princesses of the Yogyakarta Sultanate (1870)

In carrying out the local government administration, it considers three principles: decentralisation, concentration, and assistance. The provincial government carries out the responsibilities and authorities of the central government, as well as its own autonomous responsibilities and authorities. The Regional Government consists of the Head of the Region and the Legislative Assembly of the Region. Such construction guarantees good cooperation between the Head of the Region and the Legislative Assembly of the Region to achieve sound regional government administration. The Head of the Special Region of Yogyakarta has a responsibility as the Head of the Territory and is titled as a Governor.

The first governor was the late Hamengkubuwono IX, Sultan of Yogyakarta, and continued Paku Alam VIII as acting governor until Hamengkubuwono X ascended in 1998. Unlike the other heads of regions in Indonesia, the governor of the Special Region of Yogyakarta has the privilege or special status of not being bound to the period of position nor the requirements and way of appointment (article 25, paragraphs 1 and 2). However, in carrying out their duties, they have the same authority and responsibilities.

On 5 May 2015, following a royal decree issued by Hamengkubuwono X, Princess Mangkubumi (previously known as Princess Pembayun) received the new name Mangkubumi Hamemayu Hayuning Bawana Langgeng ing Mataram. This denotes her as the heiress presumptive to the sultanate. The title Mangkubumi was formerly reserved for senior male princes groomed for the throne, including the reigning sultan. The decree thus admits female royalty into the line of succession for the first time since the founding of the Sultanate. According to the current sultan, this was in line with his prerogatives; his action was nonetheless criticised by more conservative male family members such as his siblings, who were thus displaced in the line of succession.

== Residences ==
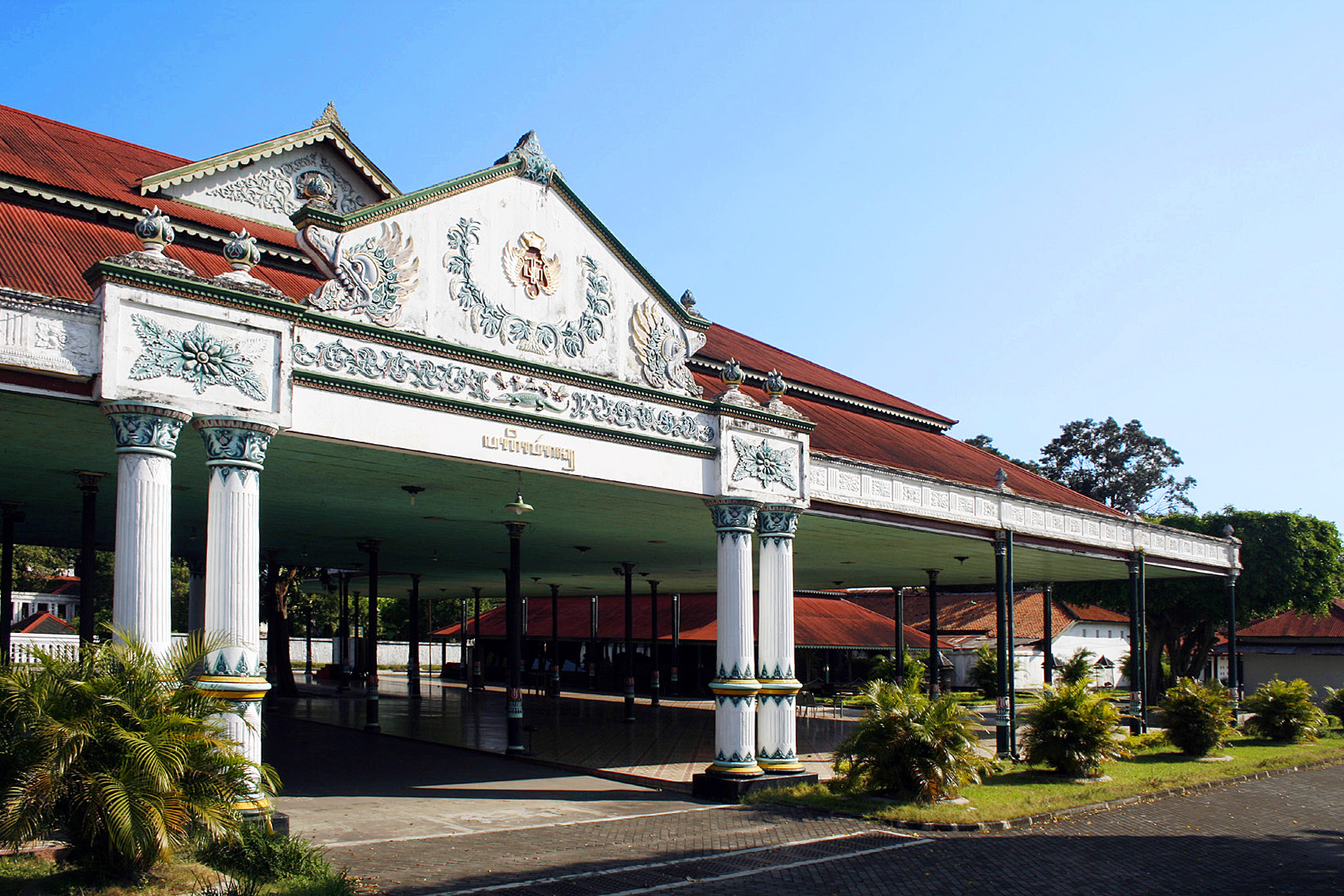
Pagelaran, the front hall of the Royal Palace of Yogyakarta

The principal residence of the sultan is the kraton (palace), sometimes called the keraton but otherwise known in formal terms Keraton Ngayogyakarta Hadiningrat (Javanese script: ꦏꦫꦠꦺꦴꦤ꧀ꦔꦪꦺꦴꦒꦾꦏꦂꦡꦲꦢꦶꦤꦶꦔꦿꦠ꧀).

== List of sultans of Yogyakarta ==
Name Birth name (Birth–Death)	Portrait	Birth	Death	Accession	Ended	Length	Lineage and description
Hamengkubuwono I Raden Mas Sujana		5 August 1717	24 March 1792 (aged 74)	13 March 1755	24 March 1792	37 years, 11 days	Son of Amangkurat IV
Hamengkubuwono II (1st reign) Raden Mas Sundoro		7 March 1750	3 January 1828 (aged 77)	2 April 1792	31 December 1810 (deposed)	18 years, 273 days	Son of Hamengkubuwono I
Hamengkubuwono III (1st reign) Raden Mas Surojo		20 February 1769	3 November 1814 (aged 45)	31 December 1810	28 December 1811 (abdicated)	362 days	Son of Hamengkubuwono II
Hamengkubuwono II (2nd reign) Raden Mas Sundoro		7 March 1750	3 January 1828 (aged 77)	28 December 1811	20 June 1812 (deposed)	175 days	Son of Hamengkubuwono I
Hamengkubuwono III (2nd reign) Raden Mas Surojo		20 February 1769	3 November 1814 (aged 45)	21 June 1812	3 November 1814	2 years, 135 days	Son of Hamengkubuwono II
Hamengkubuwono IV Gusti Raden Mas Ibnu Jarot		3 April 1804	6 December 1823 (aged 19)	9 November 1814	6 December 1823	9 years, 27 days	Son of Hamengkubuwono III
Hamengkubuwono V (1st reign) Gusti Raden Mas Gathot Menol		24 January 1820	5 June 1855 (aged 35)	19 December 1823	17 August 1826 (abdicated)	2 years, 241 days	Son of Hamengkubuwono IV
Hamengkubuwono II (3rd reign) Raden Mas Sundoro		7 March 1750	3 January 1828 (aged 77)	20 September 1826	3 January 1828	1 year, 105 days	Son of Hamengkubuwono I
Hamengkubuwono V (2nd reign) Gusti Raden Mas Gathot Menol		24 January 1820	5 June 1855 (aged 35)	17 January 1828	5 June 1855	27 years, 139 days	Son of Hamengkubuwono IV
Hamengkubuwono VI Gusti Raden Mas Mustojo		10 August 1821	20 July 1877 (aged 55)	5 July 1855	28 July 1877	22 years, 23 days	Son of Hamengkubuwono IV, brother of Hamengkubuwono V
Hamengkubuwono VII Gusti Raden Mas Murtejo		4 February 1839	30 December 1921 (aged 82)	22 December 1877	29 January 1921	43 years, 38 days	Son of Hamengkubuwono VI
Hamengkubuwono VIII Gusti Raden Mas Sujadi		3 March 1880	22 October 1939 (aged 59)	8 February 1921	29 January 1921	18 years, 256 days	Son of Hamengkubuwono VII
Hamengkubuwono IX Gusti Raden Mas Dorodjatun		12 August 1912	2 October 1988 (aged 76)	18 March 1940	2 October 1988	48 years, 198 days	Son of Hamengkubuwono VIII
Hamengkubuwono X Bendara Raden Mas Herjuno Darpito		April 2, 1946 (age 80)	–	7 March 1989	Incumbent	37 years, 261 days	Son of Hamengkubuwono IX

== See also ==
- List of Sunni Muslim dynasties
- Hamengkubuwono, including list of sultans
- List of monarchs of Java
- Kraton Yogyakarta
