= Hamengkubuwono V =

Sultan of Yogyakarta (1823–26; 1828–55)

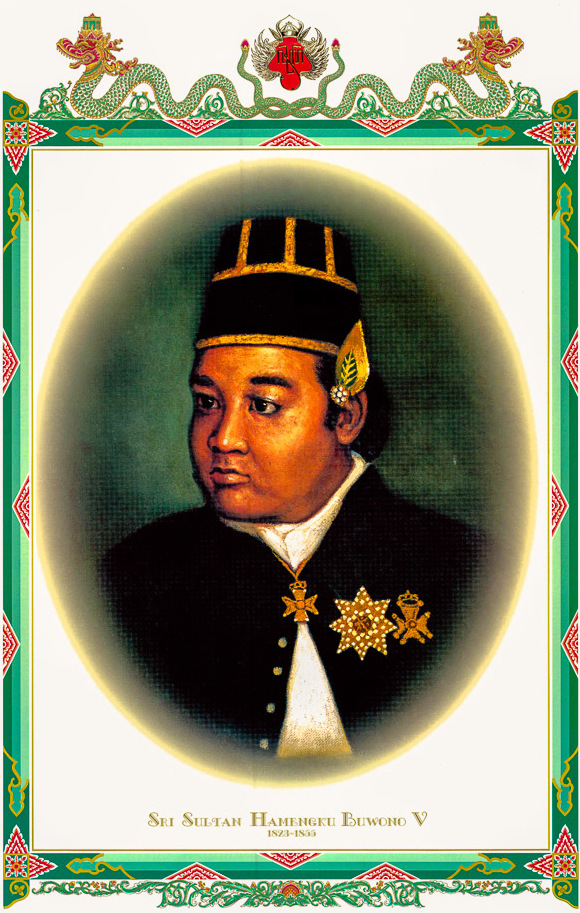
- Hamengkubuwono V

Sultan of Yogyakarta
- First reign: 19 December 1823 – 17 August 1826
- Predecessor: Hamengkubuwono IV
- Successor: Hamengkubuwono II
- Second reign: 17 January 1828 – 5 June 1855
- Predecessor: Hamengkubuwono II
- Successor: Hamengkubuwono VI
- Born: Gusti Raden Mas Gathot Menol; 24 January 1820 the Royal Palace of Yogyakarta
- Died: 5 June 1855 (aged 35) the Royal Palace of Yogyakarta
- Burial: Besiyaran Mausoleum, Pajimatan Himagiri Tombs
- Spouses: Gusti Kanjeng Ratu Kencana (m. 1834; div. 1847); Gusti Kanjeng Ratu Kedhaton (m. 1847)
- Issue: Gusti Pangeran Harya Suryaning Ngalaga
Regnal name
- Ngarsa Dalem Sampeyan Dalem Ingkang Sinuwun Kanjeng Sultan Hamengkubuwana Senapati-ing-Ngalaga 'Abdurrahman Sayyidin Panatagama Khalifatullah ingkang Jumeneng Kaping Gangsal ing Ngayogyakarta Hadiningrat
- Father: Hamengkubuwono IV
- Mother: Gusti Kanjeng Ratu Kencana

Hamengkubuwono V (also spelled Hamengkubuwana V, Yogyakarta, 24 January 1820 – Yogyakarta, 5 June 1855) was the fifth Sultan of Yogyakarta, reigning from 19 December 1823 to 17 August 1826, and then from 17 January 1828 to 5 June 1855 being interspersed by the rule of Hamengkubuwono II due to the then political instability.

== Early life ==
Born as Gusti Raden Mas Gathot Menol, he was the sixth son of Hamengkubuwono IV and his queen consort, Gusti Kangjeng Ratu Kencana. When he was 3 years old, he was crowned as Hamengkubuwono V, and ruled for 2.5 years before being succeeded by his great-grandfather, Hamengkubuwono II. Hamengkubuwono V was recrowned after his great-grandfather's death.

Upon reaching adulthood, he was styled Prince Mangkubumi. He was made lieutenant colonel in 1839 and colonel in 1847 by Dutch East Indies government.

== Reign ==
Hamengkubuwono V made his realm closer with Dutch colonial government. He intended for a bloodless struggle, hoping that there would be a mutual cooperation between Yogyakarta Sultanate and Dutch government, leading to the rise of prosperity and security of Yogyakarta people. He also focused on art. During his reign, wayang wong performances had been held five times. He also created some royal dances, the most popular was Serimpi dance and its variants.

However, his policy was opposed by some court's servants and his own brother, Gusti Raden Mas Mustojo. They viewed Hamengkubuwono V's policy as cowardly, bringing shame to Yogyakarta Palace, leading to the decline of support towards himself and the rise of support towards Mustojo. The situation was increasingly beneficial to Mustojo after marrying a Bruneian princess and forming a close brotherhood with Sultanate of Brunei. Hamengkubuwono V's rule was increasingly scrutinized after the emergence of internal conflict involving his fifth wife, Kanjeng Mas Hemawati. Hamengkubuwono V only gained support from his subjects who felt safe and prosperous during his reign.

Hamengkubuwono V died in a lesser-known incident, known as wereng saketi tresno (meaning "died by the beloved one"). Hamengkubuwono V died after being stabbed by his fifth wife, Kanjeng Mas Hemawati. Her motive is unknown.

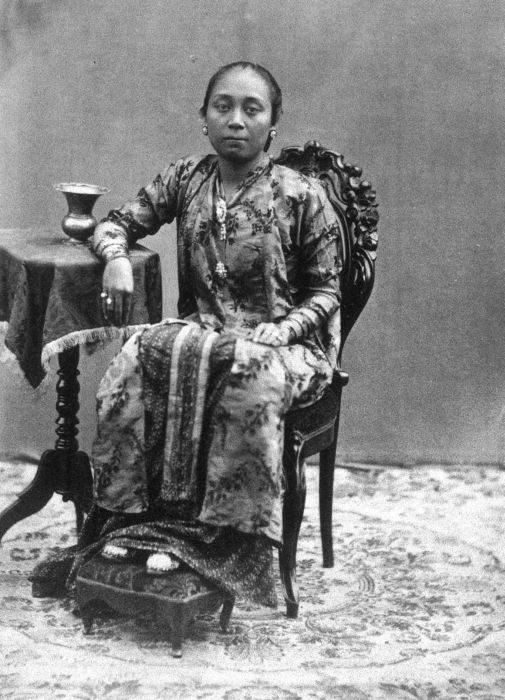
Gusti Kanjeng Ratu. Kedaton, queen consort of Hamengkubuwono V.

When the incident took place, his queen consort, Kanjeng Ratu Sekar Kedaton, was pregnant, and gave birth to a son 13 days later. The son was named Timur Muhammad.

Hamengkubuwono V was succeeded by his brother, Gusti Raden Mas Mustojo, styled as Hamengkubuwono VI.

== Personal life ==
He married Raden Ajeng Suradinah on November 4, 1834, daughter of Kanjeng Pangeran Harya Purwanegara and Gusti Kanjeng Ratu Anom. She was appointed as queen consort, designated as Gusti Kanjeng Ratu Kencana. Her mother was a daughter of Hamengkubuwono II. The couple divorced on 19 April 1847, and she was renamed Ratu Sasi.

He remarried in the next month with his first cousin, Gusti Kanjeng Ratu Kedhaton, born Raden Ajeng Andaliyah, daughter of Bendara Pangeran Harya Hadinegara (also known as Bendara Pangeran Harya Suryaning-Ngalaga), a son of Hamengkubuwono III by his concubine, Bendara Raden Ayu Puspitalangen. She gave birth to Gusti Raden Mas Timur Muhammad, the rightful successor to his father, as he was the only child born to the queen consort. Still, his uncle Hamengkubuwono VI took the throne for himself after the death of Hamengkubuwono V.

== Ancestry ==
Ancestors of Hamengkubuwono V

Hamengkubuwana II
Hamengkubuwana III
Gusti Kanjeng Ratu Kedhaton
Hamengkubuwana IV
Kanjeng Raden Tumenggung Sasradiningrat
Gusti Kanjeng Ratu Kencana
Bendara Raden Ayu Sasradiningrat
Hamengkubuwana V
Kanjeng Raden Tumenggung Danukusuma
Kanjeng Raden Adipati Danureja II
Bendara Raden Ayu Danukusuma
Gusti Kanjeng Ratu Kencana
Hamengkubuwana II
Gusti Kanjeng Ratu Hangger
Gusti Kanjeng Ratu Kedhaton

== Literature ==
- Purwadi. 2007. Sejarah Raja-Raja Jawa. Yogyakarta: Media Ilmu.
- Heryanto F. 2004. Mengenal Keraton Ngayogyakarta Hadiningrat. Yogyakarta: Warna Grafika.

Regnal titles
Preceded by Hamengkubuwono IV	Sultan of Yogyakarta (First Reign); 1823–1826	Succeeded by Hamengkubuwono II
Preceded by Hamengkubuwono II	Sultan of Yogyakarta (Second Reign); 1828–1855	Succeeded by Hamengkubuwono VI
