= Hamengkubuwono =

Ruling dynasty in Yogyakarta, Indonesia

Hamengkubuwono ꦲꦩꦼꦁꦑꦸꦨꦮꦟ
- Javanese royal house
- Parent house: House of Mataram (agnatic line)
- Country: Indonesia
- Founded: 1755; 271 years ago
- Founder: Hamengkubuwono I
- Current head: Hamengkubuwono X
- Titles: Sri Sultan of Yogyakarta; Governor of Yogyakarta; Vice President of Indonesia; Deputy Prime Minister of Indonesia
- Estate: Kraton Ngayogyakarta Hadiningrat

Hamengkubuwono (Note: also spelt Hamengkubuwana and in Dutch and Indonesian Old Spelling transcription Hamengkoeboewono) (Javanese: ꦲꦩꦼꦁꦑꦸꦨꦮꦟ) is the current ruling royal house of the Yogyakarta Sultanate in the Special Region of Yogyakarta of Indonesia. The reigning Sultan of Yogyakarta is the hereditary Governor of the Special Region (Act No. 13 of 2012, article 18 paragraph 1c) with terms of 5 years (article 25 paragraph 1) without bounded by periodic provision (article 25 paragraph 2), as normally applied to such public office. The current Sultan is Hamengkubuwono X.

== Honorifics ==
As with many significant historical and respected figures in Javanese culture, the name of a ruler is usually preceded by honorifics – in most cases the usage is of Sri Sultan before the name. In full titles the first Hamengkubuwono was titled:

"Ngarsadalem Sampeyandalem Hingkang Sinuhun Kangjeng Sultan Hamengkubuwono, Senopati Ing Ngalaga Ngabdurrahman Sayidin Panatagama Kalifatulah, Hingkang Jumeneng Kaping I".

== Etymology ==
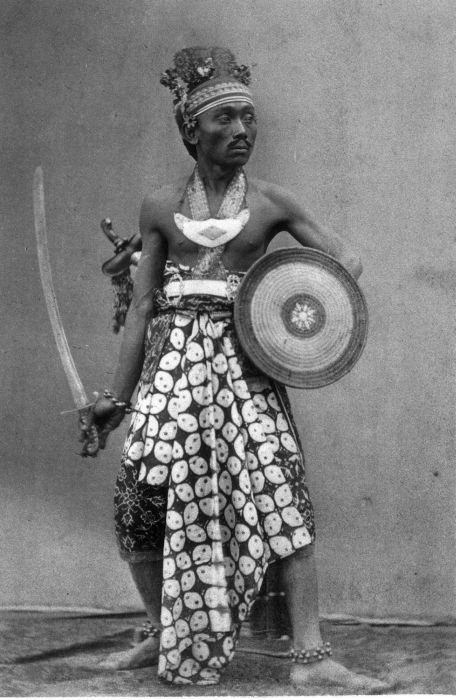
Guard of the Sultan (c. 1880)

For some Javanese, the name has been interpreted as having the following components:

- Hamangku: pleased to serve the people
- Hamengku: protect the people in a just way
- Hamengkoni: ready to take responsibility of a leader
- Buwono: the Javanese universe

Such an explanation does not necessarily coincide with strict etymology of the word.

== List of sultans of Yogyakarta (1755–present) ==
This list is of ruling dates, see specific articles for birth dates. This marriage(s) list only included the queen consorts of the monarch except for Hamengkubuwana VIII whose highest ranking wife was a crown princess consort and concubines of Hamengkubuwana IX as they're equal in rank.

| Name | Portrait | Birth | Marriage(s) | Death | Note | Ref. |
|---|---|---|---|---|---|---|
| Hamengkubuwono I Bendara Raden Mas Sujono 13 February 1755 – 24 March 1792 (37 years, 41 days) | | Kartasura; 6 August 1717 Son of Amangkurat IV | GKR Kencana; GKR Kadipaten/GKR Hageng/GKR Tegalrejo | Yogyakarta; 24 March 1792 Aged 74 years, 231 days | | |
| Hamengkubuwono II; Gusti Raden Mas Sundoro 2 April 1792 – 31 December 1810 (18 years, 274 days) | | Yogyakarta; 7 March 1750 Son of Hamengkubuwono I | GKR Kedhaton; GKR Hemas; GKR Kencana Wulan; GKR Sultan (25 wives); 80 children | Yogyakarta; 3 January 1828 Aged 77 years, 302 days | 1st reign | |
| Hamengkubuwono III; Raden Mas Surojo 31 December 1810 – 28 December 1811 (363 days) | | Yogyakarta; 20 February 1769 Son of Hamengkubuwono II | GKR Kencana/GKR Hageng; GKR Hemas; GKR Wandhan (25 wives); 32 children | Yogyakarta; 3 November 1814 Aged 45 years, 256 days | 1st reign | |
| Hamengkubuwono II; Gusti Raden Mas Sundoro 28 December 1811 – 21 June 1812 (177 days) | | Yogyakarta; 7 March 1750 Son of Hamengkubuwono I | GKR Kedhaton; GKR Hemas; GKR Kencana Wulan; GKR Sultan (25 wives); 80 children | Yogyakarta; 3 January 1828 Aged 77 years, 302 days | 2nd reign | |
| Hamengkubuwono III; Raden Mas Surojo 28 June 1812 – 3 November 1814 (2 years, 129 days) | | Yogyakarta; 20 February 1769 Son of Hamengkubuwono II | GKR Kencana/GKR Hageng; GKR Hemas; GKR Wandhan (25 wives); 32 children | Yogyakarta; 3 November 1814 Aged 45 years, 256 days | 2nd reign | |
| Hamengkubuwono IV; Raden Mas Ibnu Jarot 9 November 1814 – 6 December 1823 (9 years, 28 days) | | Yogyakarta; 3 April 1804 Son of Hamengkubuwono III | GKR Kencana/GKR Hageng (9 wives); 18 children | Yogyakarta; 6 December 1823 Aged 19 years, 247 days | | |
| Hamengkubuwono V Raden Mas Gathot Menol 19 December 1823 – 17 August 1826 (2 years, 242 days) | | Yogyakarta; 20 January 1820 Son of Hamengkubuwono IV | GKR Kencana/GKR Sasi; GKR Kedhaton (5 wives); 9 children | Yogyakarta; 5 June 1855 Aged 35 years, 136 days | 1st reign | |
| Hamengkubuwono II; Gusti Raden Mas Sundoro 17 August 1826 – 3 January 1828 (1 year, 140 days) | | Yogyakarta; 7 March 1750 Son of Hamengkubuwono I | GKR Kedhaton; GKR Hemas; GKR Kencana Wulan; GKR Sultan (25 wives); 80 children | Yogyakarta; 3 January 1828 Aged 77 years, 302 days | 3rd reign | |
| Hamengkubuwono V Raden Mas Gathot Menol 17 January 1828 – June 5, 1855 (27 years, 140 days) | | Yogyakarta; 20 January 1820 Son of Hamengkubuwono IV | BRAj Suradinah/GKR Kencana/GKR Sasi; RAj Andaliyah/GKR Kedhaton (5 wives); 9 children | Yogyakarta; 5 June 1855 Aged 35 years, 136 days | 2nd reign | |
| Hamengkubuwono VI; Raden Mas Mustojo 5 July 1855 – 20 July 1877 (22 years, 16 days) | | Yogyakarta; 10 August 1821 Brother of Hamengkubuwono V | GRAj Kuspiyah/GKR Kencana/GKR Hamengkubuwana; GKR Sultan/GKR Hageng (10 wives); 23 children | Yogyakarta; 20 July 1877 Aged 55 years, 344 days | | |
| Hamengkubuwono VII; Raden Mas Murtejo 22 December 1877 – 29 January 1921 (43 years, 39 days) | | Yogyakarta; 4 February 1839 Son of Hamengkubuwono VI | GKR Hemas/GKR Hageng/GKR Tegalrejo; GKR Kencana/GKR Wandhan; GKR Kencana II (18 wives); 69 children | Yogyakarta; 30 December 1921 Aged 82 years, 329 days | | |
| Hamengkubuwono VIII; Raden Mas Sujadi 8 February 1921 – 22 October 1939 (18 years, 257 days) | | Yogyakarta; 3 March 1880 Son of Hamengkubuwono VII | RAj Kustilah/KRAy Adipati Anom Hamengkunegara (8 wives); 41 children | Yogyakarta; 22 October 1939 Aged 59 years, 233 days | | |
| Hamengkubuwono IX; Raden Mas Dorodjatun 18 March 1940 – 2 October 1988 (48 years, 199 days) | | Yogyakarta; 12 August 1912 Son of Hamengkubuwono VIII | KRAy Pintakapurnama (1940); KRAy Widyaningrum (1943); KRAy Hastungkara (1948); KRAy Ciptamurti; Norma Musa/KRAy Nindya Kirana (1977); 20 children | Washington, D.C. 2 October 1988 Aged 76 years, 51 days | Also served as Governor of Yogyakarta (1945–1988) and Vice President of Indonesia (1973–1978) | |
| Hamengkubuwono X Raden Mas Herjuno Darpito 7 March 1989 – present (37 years, 247 days) | | Yogyakarta; 2 April 1946 Son of Hamengkubuwono IX | Gusti Kanjeng Ratu Hemas (Tatiek Drajad Supriastuti) 5 children | Living; Age 80 years, 220 days | Also served as Governor of Yogyakarta (1998–present) | |

== See also ==
- History of Yogyakarta
- Susuhunan
- List of monarchs of Java
