= Hamengkubuwono I =

Sultan of Yogyakarta from 1755 to 1792

- His Majesty The Sri Sultan of Yogyakarta
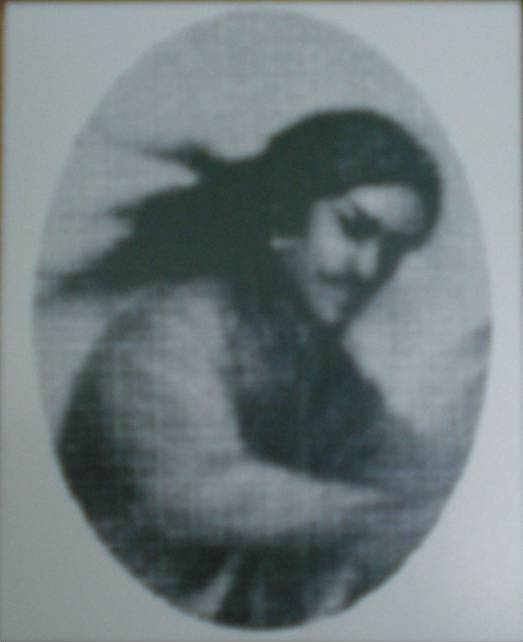

1st Sri Sultan of Yogyakarta
- Reign: 1755–1792
- Coronation: 13 March 1755
- Successor: Hamengkubuwono II
- Born: Bendara Raden Mas Sujono; 5 August 1717; Kartasura
- Died: 24 March 1792 (aged 74); Kraton Yogyakarta, Yogyakarta, Yogyakarta Sultanate
- Burial: Astana Kasuwargan, Imogiri, Yogyakarta
- Spouses: Gusti Kanjeng Ratu Kencana (died 1777) Gusti Kanjeng Ratu Kadipaten ()
- Issue more...: Kanjeng Gusti Pangeran Adipati Anom; Gusti Kanjeng Ratu Bendara; Hamengkubuwana II; Paku Alam I
Regnal name
- Ngarsa Dalem Sampeyan Dalem Hingkang Sinuhun Kangjeng Sultan Hamengkubuwono, Senopati Ing Ngalaga Ngabdurrahman Sayidin Panatagama Kalifatulah, Hingkang Jumeneng Kaping I
- House: Mataram
- Father: Prabu Amangkurat IV
- Mother: Mas Ayu Tejawati
- Religion: Islam

Hamengkubuwono I, 1st Sri Sultan of Yogyakarta (Javanese script: ꦱꦸꦭ꧀ꦠꦤ꧀ꦲꦩꦼꦁꦏꦸꦧꦸꦮꦤꦆ, Bahasa Jawa: Sri Sultan Hamengkubuwono I), born Raden Mas Sujana (Kartasura, 16 August 1717 – Yogyakarta, Yogyakarta Sultanate 24 March 1792), was the first sultan of Yogyakarta. He reigned from 1755 to 1792. He has been elevated as a National Hero of Indonesia since 2006, because of his fight against the Dutch at that time and establishment of Yogyakarta.

== Personal life ==
His senior queen consort, Gusti Kanjeng Ratu Kencana, was a granddaughter of Pakubuwana I, through his son, Bendara Pangeran Harya Dipanegara of Madiun. The second queen consort, Gusti Kanjeng Ratu Kadipaten, was a daughter of Kyai Ageng Drepayuda. His concubine, Bendara Raden Ayu Dayaasmara, was a daughter of Ngabehi Kramaleksana, another concubine, Bendara Raden Ayu Turunsih, was his sister.

Ratu Kencana's son, Raden Mas Entho, who was already installed as the Kanjeng Gusti Pangeran Adipati Anom (Crown Prince) prior to the Giyanti Treaty, fell ill and shortly died after returning from a visit to Borobudur. The Kronik Suksesi Keraton Jawa 1755-1989 reported the visit took place in the late August 1758 where he was reportedly involved in relationship with Chinese lady which was considered highly inappropriate for a crown prince and angered his father. He was believed to died by food poisoning in the late month at the age of 19, although it's uncertain who ordered the poisoning. Some accounts attributed to his father, while the others to C. Donkel, the first VOC Resident of Yogyakarta. In 1758, Raden Mas Sundoro (the future Hamengkubuwana II), a son born to Ratu Kadipaten, was underwent circumcision and appointed as new crown prince.

== Family ==
Royal consorts

- Gusti Kanjeng Ratu Kencana, first cousin of the Sultan. She was a member of the Mataram royal household and granddaughter of Pakubuwana I.
  - Gusti Raden Ajeng Inten, styled Gusti Kanjeng Ratu Bendara
    - Married Kanjeng Gusti Pangeran Adipati Arya Mangkunegara I
    - Married Bendara Pangeran Harya Dipanegara
  - Gusti Raden Mas Êntho (died 1758), appointed as the Kanjeng Gusti Pangeran Adipati Anom Hamengkunegara (Crown Prince) of Yogyakarta
- Gusti Kanjeng Ratu Kadipaten, later the Gusti Kanjeng Ratu Hageng (Queen Dowager)
  - Gusti Raden Mas Sundara (1750 - 1828), appointed as the Kanjeng Gusti Pangeran Adipati Anom Hamengkunegara (Crown Prince) of Yogyakarta, succeeded as Hamengkubuwana II

Concubines

- Bendara Raden Ayu Srenggara
  - Bendara Raden Ayu Danukusuma
    - Married Raden Tumenggung Danukusuma
  - Bendara Pangeran Harya Natakusuma, later Kanjeng Gusti Pangeran Adipati Arya Paku Alam I
- Bendara Raden Ayu Turunsih
  - Bendara Pangeran Harya Mangkukusuma
  - Bendara Raden Ayu Danunegara
    - Married Raden Tumenggung Danunegara
- Mas Rara Ketul, styled Bendara Raden Ayu Dayaasmara
  - Bendara Pangeran Harya Hadikusuma
  - Bendara Raden Ayu Juru
  - Bendara Pangeran Harya Balitar

Hamengkubuwono I Hamengkubuwono
First	Sultan of Yogyakarta; 1755–1792	Succeeded by Hamengkubuwono II
