= Hamengkubuwono II =

Three-time Sultan of Yogyakarta (1750–1828)

- His Majesty The Sri Sultan of Yogyakarta
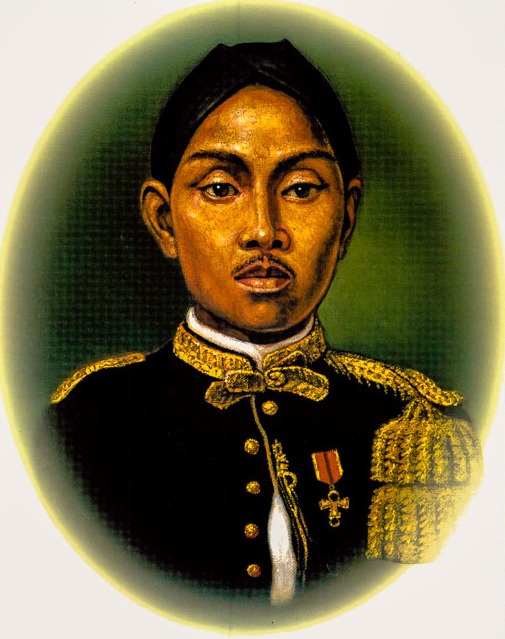

2nd Sri Sultan of Yogyakarta
- First reign: 2 April 1792 – 31 December 1810
- Predecessor: Hamengkubuwono I
- Successor: Hamengkubuwono III
- Second reign: 28 December 1811 – 20 June 1812
- Predecessor: Hamengkubuwono III
- Successor: Hamengkubuwono III
- Third reign: 20 September 1826 – 3 January 1828
- Predecessor: Hamengkubuwono V
- Successor: Hamengkubuwono V
- Born: Gusti Raden Mas Sundoro; 7 March 1750; Mount Sindoro, Central Java
- Died: 3 January 1828 (aged 77); Yogyakarta
- Burial: Kotagede, Yogyakarta
- Wives: Gusti Kanjeng Ratu Kedhaton; Gusti Kanjeng Ratu Hemas; Gusti Kanjeng Ratu Kencono Wulan; Gusti Kanjeng Ratu Sultan
- Issue: Hamengkubuwono III
Regnal name
- Ngarsa Dalem Sampeyan Dalem Ingkang Sinuwun Kanjeng Sultan Hamengkubuwana Senapati-ing-Ngalaga 'Abdurrahman Sayyidin Panatagama Khalifatullah ingkang Jumeneng Kaping Kalih ing Ngayogyakarta Hadiningrat
- House: Mataram
- Father: Hamengkubuwono I
- Mother: Gusti Kanjeng Ratu Kadipaten
- Religion: Islam

Hamengkubuwono II, 2nd Sri Sultan of Yogyakarta (also spelled Hamengkubuwana II, 7 March 1750 – 3 January 1828), born Raden Mas Sundoro, was the second sultan of Yogyakarta 1792–1810, 1811–12 and finally 1826–28 during the Java War.

== Early life ==
He was the fifth son of Hamengkubuwana I, eldest son born to his second queen consort, Gusti Kanjeng Ratu Kadipaten. He spent his childhood with his mother, in a refugee camp due to the war against the VOC.

In his youth, he was sent to Surakarta, intended to get to know better his future bride candidate, Gusti Kanjeng Ratu Alit, the eldest daughter of Pakubuwana III. The son of their union would be expected to reunite Kasultanan Yogyakarta and Kasunanan Surakarta. However, the plan failed as Gusti Kanjeng Ratu Alit, sooner or later, wed Kanjeng Pangeran Harya Prabu Hamijaya, eldest son of Mangkunegara I born to a junior wife, Raden Ayu Kusumapatahati. This was considered humiliation to Yogyakarta, which resulted in the return of his half-sister, Gusti Kanjeng Ratu Bendara, who sued Mangkunegara I for divorce.

== Reign ==
He succeeded his father, Hamengkubuwono I, who died in 1792. After Daendels pressured him, in December 1810, he was forced to abdicate in favour of his son, Raden Mas Surojo, who was made the new sultan, under the name Hamengkubuwono III. However, nearly one year later, in 1811, the English under Stamford Raffles restored him to the throne. However, due to his aggressive behaviour towards the English, six months later in June 1812, he was deposed and exiled to Penang. He returned to Java in 1815, but in 1817, deeming him a threat, he was exiled for the second time by the Dutch, this time to Ambon.

In 1826, the Dutch decided to return him from exile and restored him as the sultan. His third reign coincided with the Java War. On 3 January 1828, he died. He was succeeded by his great-grandson, Hamengkubuwono V. He was buried in Kotagede instead of the royal graveyard of Imogiri, due to the turbulence at the time.

== Personal life ==
He had four queens consorts. The first was Gusti Kanjeng Ratu Kedhaton, daughter of Kanjeng Raden Tumenggung Purwadiningrat, Regent of Magetan. The second was of Surakarta lineage, Gusti Kanjeng Ratu Hemas, granddaughter of Pakubuwana II through his daughter, Gusti Kanjeng Ratu Alit, wife of Kanjeng Pangeran Harya Pakuningrat. The third queen, Gusti Kanjeng Ratu Kencana Wulan, was a daughter of Ki Bener, brother of Mas Tumenggung Sindureja. The last, Gusti Kanjeng Ratu Sultan, was a daughter of Kanjeng Raden Tumenggung Resagata, Regent of Sukowati. His concubine, Bendara Raden Ayu Nilaresmi, was a daughter of Ngabehi Wiryakrama, the Mantri Gunung of Tlagapitan.

His famous children were: Gusti Pangeran Haryo Mangkubumi / Kanjeng Gusti Panembahan Mangkurat, son of GKR. Kedhaton. Main supporters of Pangeran Diponegoro and one of his commanders-in-chief, and Bendoro Pangeran Haryo Joyokusumo / Bendoro Pangeran Haryo Hangabehi, son of Bendoro Mas Ayu Sumarsonowati. His maternal side is one of the sultan's concubines, who was of Javanese-Chinese ethnicity, commonly known as Peranakan Chinese. One of Pangeran Diponegoro's beloved uncles and loyal supporters. In the Java War, he acted as a war strategist and battlefield commander.

== Family ==
Royal Consorts

- Gusti Kanjeng Ratu Kedhaton
  - Gusti Raden Mas Suraja (1769 - 1814), appointed as the Kanjeng Gusti Pangeran Adipati Anom Hamengkunegara (Crown Prince) of Yogyakarta, succeeded as Hamengkubuwana III
  - Gusti Kanjeng Ratu Bendara
    - Married Kanjeng Raden Tumenggung Sumadiningrat
  - Gusti Kanjeng Ratu Hangger
    - Married Kanjeng Raden Adipati Danureja II
  - Gusti Kanjeng Ratu Madurêtna
    - Married Raden Rangga Prawiradirja III
- Gusti Kanjeng Ratu Hemas, first cousin once removed of the Sultan. She was a member of Surakarta royal family and granddaughter of Pakubuwana II.
  - Gusti Pangeran Harya Mangkudiningrat
- Gusti Kanjeng Ratu Kencana Wulan
  - Gusti Kanjeng Ratu Hayu
    - Married Kanjeng Gusti Pangeran Adipati Arya Paku Alam II
  - Gusti Kanjeng Ratu Anom
    - Married Kanjeng Pangeran Harya Purwanegara
  - Gusti Kanjeng Ratu Timur
    - Married Kanjeng Pangeran Harya Suryaningprang
  - Gusti Kanjeng Ratu Sasi
    - Married Kanjeng Raden Adipati Danureja III
- Gusti Kanjeng Ratu Sultan

Concubines

- Raden Ayu Sepuh
  - Bendara Pangeran Harya Martasana or Bendara Pangeran Harya Murdaningrat
- Bendara Raden Ayu Nilaresmi
  - Bendara Raden Ayu Pringgadirja
- Mas Ajeng Sudarsana Sari
  - Bendara Pangeran Harya Jayakusuma
- Raden Ayu Daya
  - Bendara Pangeran Harya Hadiwinata I
  - Bendara Pangeran Harya Hadiwinata II
- Mas Ajeng Mirmasari
  - Bendara Pangeran Harya Puger

=== Notable Descendants ===
1. Diponegoro
  son of Hamengkubuwana III. An Indonesian National Hero who resisted Dutch colonial rule during Java War (1825–1830).
2. Raden Ayu Nataningprang
  daughter of Gusti Pangeran Harya Mangkudiningrat. A primary consort to Kanjeng Pangeran Harya Nataningprang, Paku Alam III, and Paku Alam V, mother of Paku Alam IV.
3. Sukarno
  great-great-grandson of Kanjeng Gusti Pangeran Harya Mangkudiningrat, son of GKR Hemas, Indonesian Founding Father and the first president of Indonesia.
4. Freya Jayawardana, a member of JKT48. On her 17th Birthday, she received a noble title, "Raden Roro."
5. Margono Djojohadikusumo
  great-great-grandson of Bendara Pangeran Harya Martosono, the founder and first president of Bank Negara Indonesia.
6. Sumitro Djojohadikusumo
  great-great-great-grandson of Bendara Pangeran Harya Martosono, minister during the administrations of Sukarno and Suharto.
7. Prabowo Subianto
  great-great-great-great-grandson of Bendara Pangeran Harya Martosono, eighth president of Indonesia.
8. Hashim Djojohadikusumo
  great-great-great-great-grandson of Bendara Pangeran Harya Martosono, an Indonesian entrepreneur and billionaire.
9. Didit Hediprasetyo
  great-great-great-great-great-grandson of Bendara Pangeran Harya Martosono, an Indonesian fashion designer.
10. Aryo Djojohadikusumo
  great-great-great-great-great-grandson of Bendara Pangeran Harya Martosono, an Indonesian Representative Council member.
11. Rahayu Saraswati
  great-great-great-great-great-granddaughter of Bendara Pangeran Harya Martosono, an Indonesian Representative Council.

== See also ==
- Hamengkubuwono
- Herman Willem Daendels

Regnal titles
Preceded by Hamengkubuwono I	Sultan of Yogyakarta (First Reign); 1792–1810	Succeeded by Hamengkubuwono III
Preceded by Hamengkubuwono III	Sultan of Yogyakarta (Second Reign); 1811–1812	Succeeded by Hamengkubuwono III
Preceded by Hamengkubuwono V	Sultan of Yogyakarta (Third Reign); 1826–1828	Succeeded by Hamengkubuwono V
