= Kraton Ngayogyakarta Hadiningrat =

Royal palace complex in Yogyakarta, Indonesia

Royal Palace of Yogyakarta
- Keraton Ngayogyakarta Hadiningrat ꦏꦿꦠꦺꦴꦤ꧀ꦔꦪꦺꦴꦒꦾꦏꦂꦠꦲꦢꦶꦤꦶꦔꦿꦠ꧀
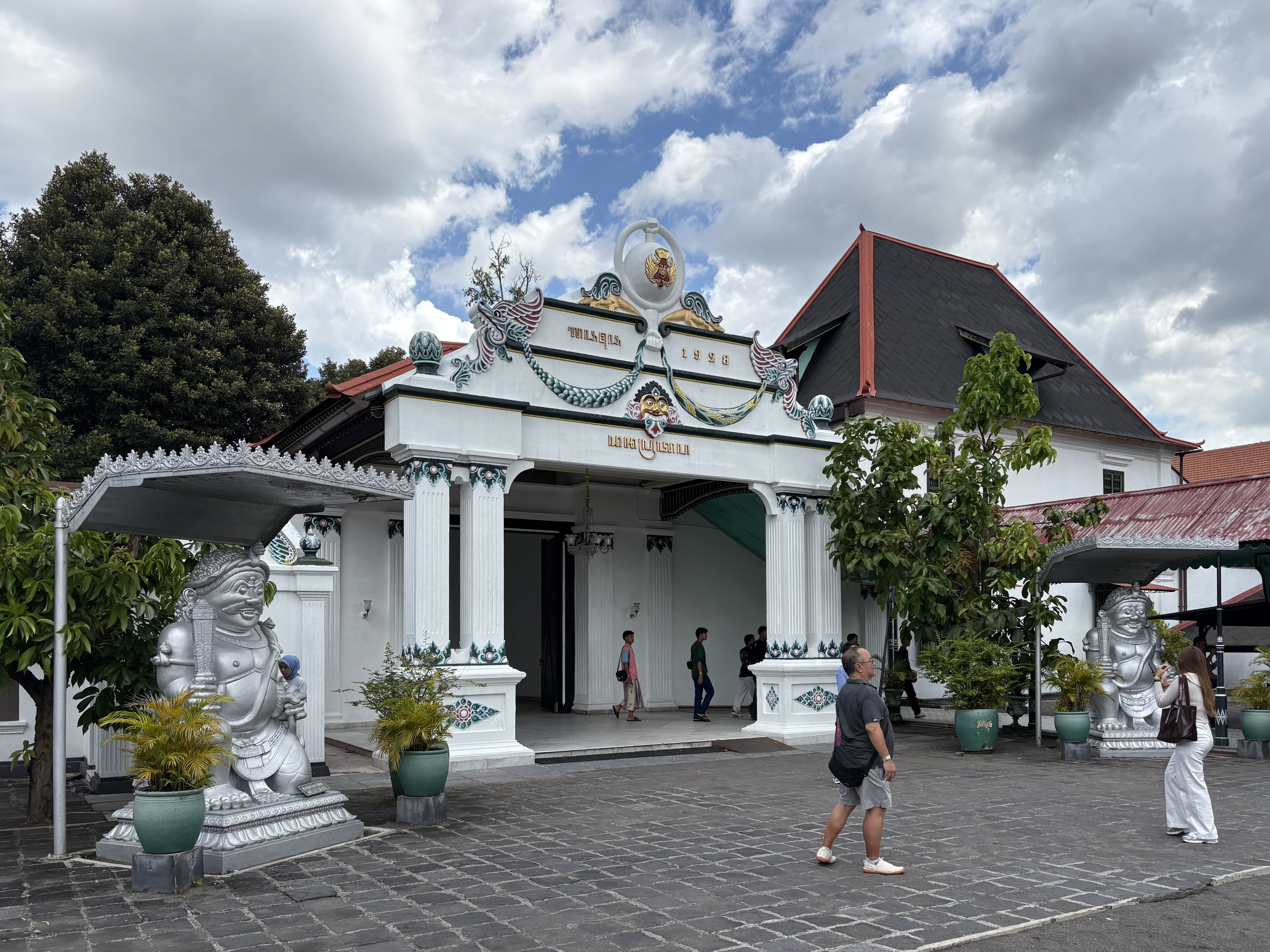
- Donopratono Gate with two Dvarapalas of Kraton Yogyakarta

- Location within Yogyakarta
- Alternative names: Kraton Jogja

General information
- Type: Royal palace
- Architectural style: Javanese Architecture
- Location: Jl. Rotowijayan 1 55133, Yogyakarta, Indonesia
- Coordinates: 7°48′20″S 110°21′51″E
- Current tenants: Hamengkubuwono X
- Construction started: 1755
- Completed: 1756
- Client: House of Hamengkubuwono
- Owner: Sultan of Yogyakarta

Technical details
- Size: 1.4 hectares (3.5 acres)

Design and construction
- Architect: Hamengkubuwono I

Website
- https://www.kratonjogja.id
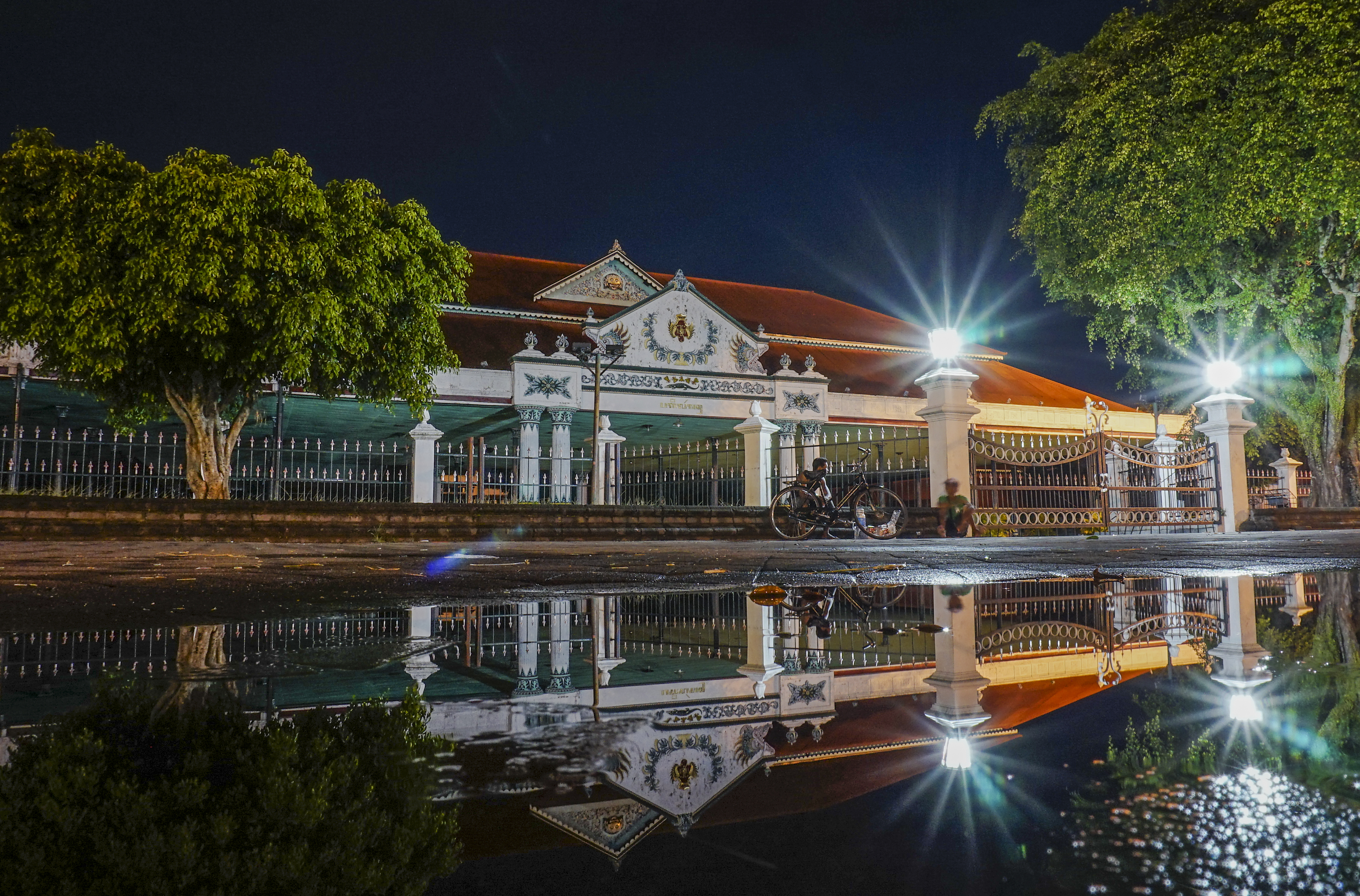
- Pagelaran hall of Kraton Yogyakarta

UNESCO World Heritage Site
- Official name: The Cosmological Axis of Yogyakarta and its Historic Landmarks
- Criteria: Cultural: ii, iii
- Reference: 1671
- Inscription: 2023 (45th Session)

The Royal Palace of Yogyakarta (Indonesian: Keraton Ngayogyakarta Hadiningrat, Javanese: ꦏꦿꦠꦺꦴꦤ꧀ꦔꦪꦺꦴꦒꦾꦏꦂꦠꦲꦢꦶꦤꦶꦔꦿꦠ꧀, romanized: Kraton Ngayogyakarta Adiningrat) is a palace complex in the city of Yogyakarta, Yogyakarta Special Region, Indonesia. It is the seat of the reigning Sultan of Yogyakarta and his family. The complex is a center of Javanese culture and contains a museum displaying royal artifacts. It is guarded by the Yogyakarta Kraton Guards (Indonesian: Prajurit Keraton Ngayogyakarta Hadiningrat).

== History ==
The complex was built in 1755–1756 (AJ 1682) for Hamengkubuwono I, the first Sultan of Yogyakarta. It was one of the monarch's first acts after the signing of the Treaty of Giyanti, which recognized the creation of the Sultanate of Yogyakarta under the Dutch East India Company. A banyan forest, protected from flooding due to its location between two rivers, was chosen as the site for the palace.

On 20 June 1812, Sir Stamford Raffles led a 1,200-strong British and Irish force to attack the walled royal city of Yogyakarta. Although they outnumbered the British, the Javanese were unprepared for the attack. Yogyakarta fell in one day, and the palace was sacked and burnt. The attack was the first of its kind on a Javanese court, and the Sultanate briefly became subject to British authority before the British government returned control of Indonesia to the Dutch. Most of the current palace was built by Sultan Hamengkubuwono VIII (who reigned from 1921 to 1939) and was rebuilt after earthquakes in 1876 and 2006.

== Architecture ==
The palace's chief architect was Sultan Hamengkubuwono I, who founded the Yogyakarta Sultanate. His architectural expertise was appreciated by the Dutch scientist Theodoor Gautier Thomas Pigeaud and Lucien Adam, who considered him a worthy successor of Pakubuwono II (founder of the Surakarta Sunanate). The palace layout, which followed the basic design of the old city of Yogyakarta, was completed in 1755–1756; another building was added by a later Sultan of Yogyakarta.

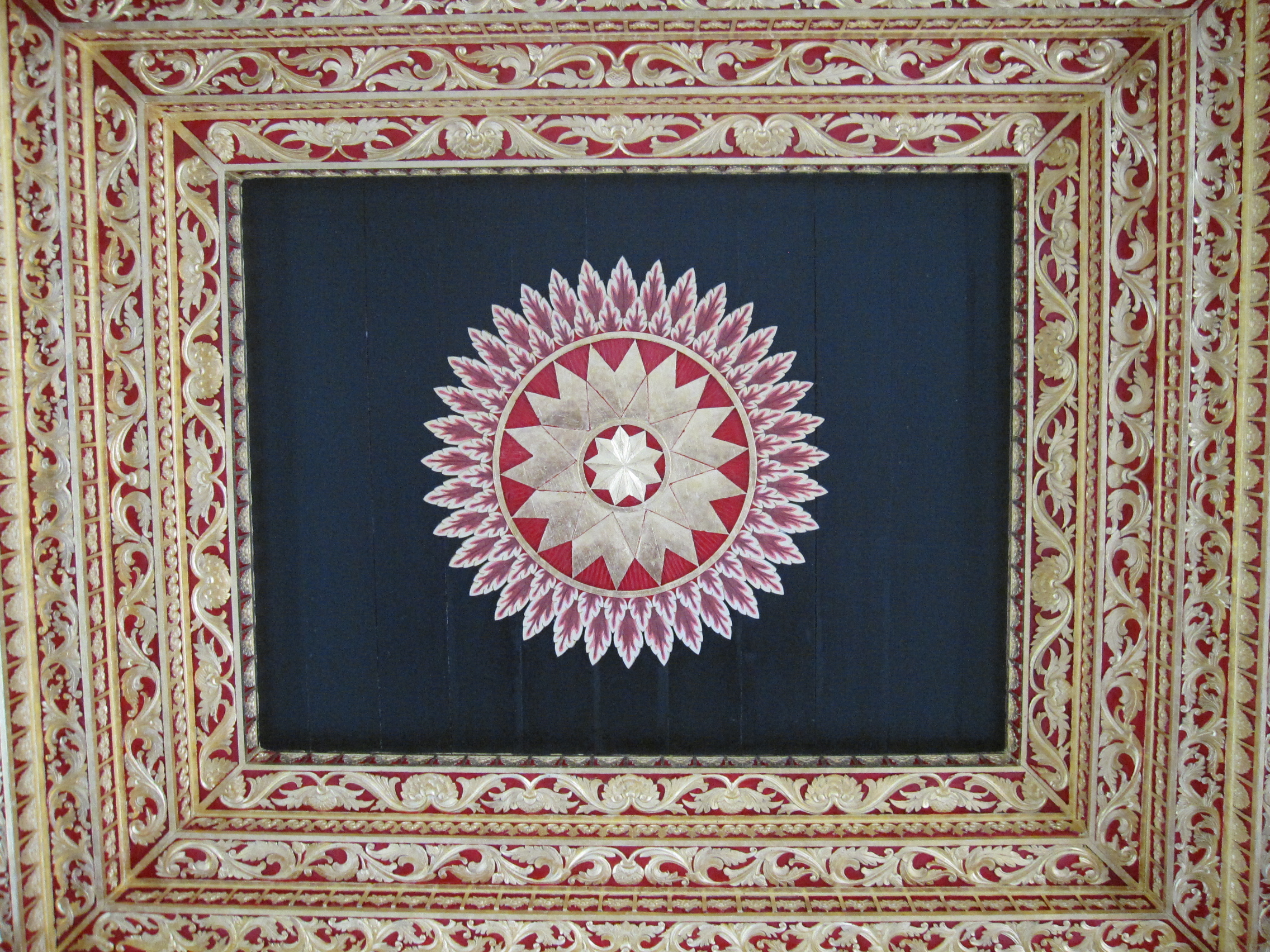
Javanese architecture uses floral patterns, such as this relief on the palace ceiling.

The complex consists of a courtyard covered with sand from the south coast, a main building, and a secondary building. The buildings are separated by a wall with a regol in semar tinandu style. The palace door is made of thick teak. Behind (or in front of) a gate in Javanese architecture is usually an insulating wall (Renteng or Baturono), sometimes with a distinctive, traditional ornament.

The wooden buildings of the complex have a traditional Javanese architectural style, decorated with flora, fauna, or nature motifs. Foreign influences (Portuguese, Dutch, and Chinese) are also seen. The buildings are of joglo construction.

The trapezoidal joglo roof is usually covered with red or gray shingles, tiles, or zinc. It is supported by a central pillar (soko guru) and secondary pillars. Pillars are usually dark green or black, with yellow, light green red or gold highlights. Other wooden building elements match the pillars in color.

The stone pedestal (Ompak), the black color is combined with gold ornamentation. White dominates the walls of the building and the complex. The floor, usually white marble or patterned tiles, is higher than the sandy courtyard. Some buildings have a higher main floor. Other buildings have a square stone (Selo Gilang) for the sultan's throne.

Each building is classified by use. The main-class building (used by the sultan) has more ornamentation than the lower-class buildings, which have little or no ornamentation.

== Symbolism ==
A kraton is a palace. Keraton is the living quarters of the royal family. Tamarind and Spanish cherry trees line the road from Krapyak Hunting House to the palace, which runs from Tugu Yogyakarta to the palace.

== Performances ==
The palace hosts gamelan (music), Javanese dance, macapat (poetry), and wayang (shadow puppetry) performances.

== In popular culture ==
The Kraton Ngayogyakarta Hadiningrat was the second Pit Stop in The Amazing Race 19.

== Gallery ==
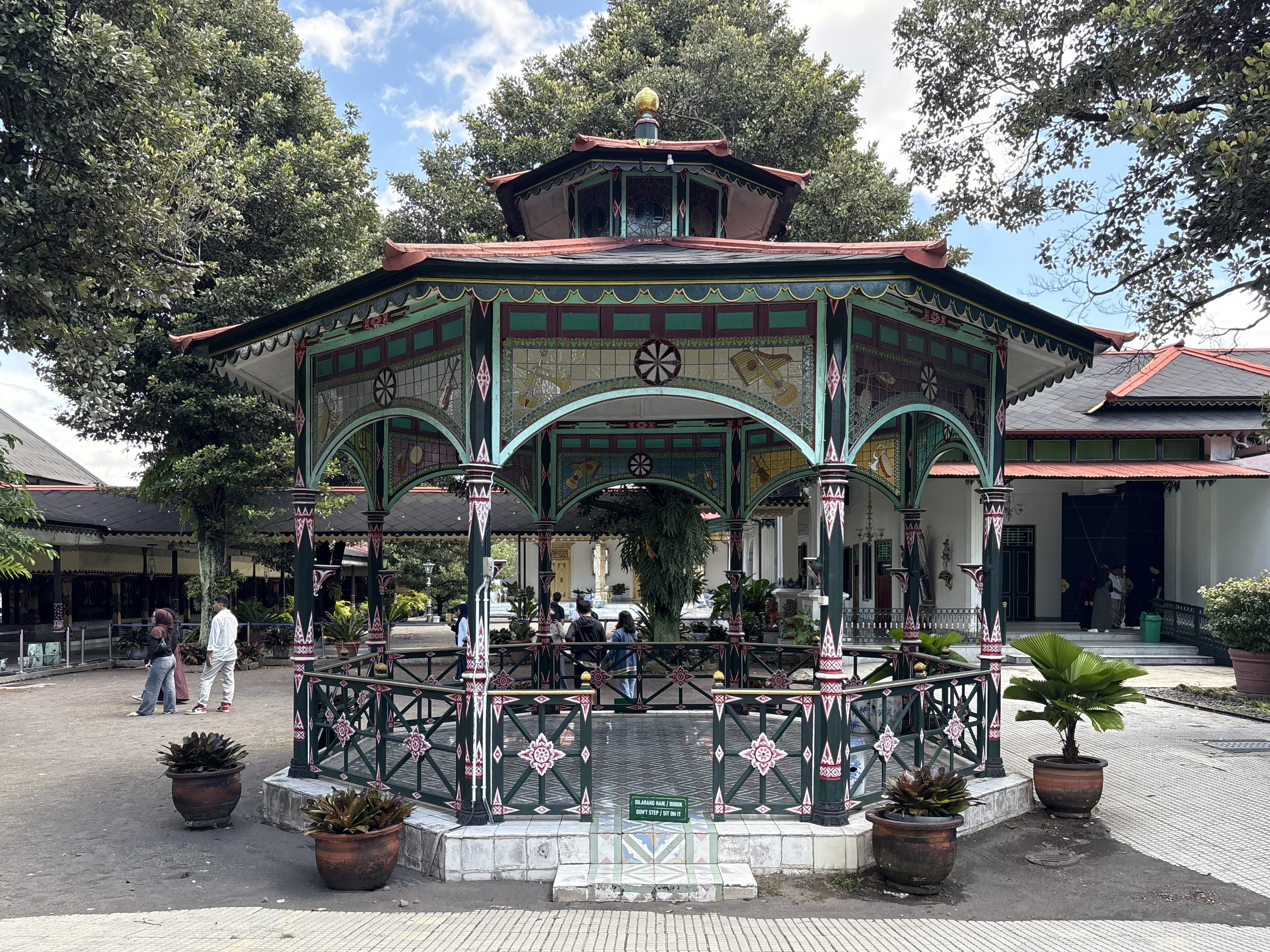
Bangsal Mandalasana or the bandstand

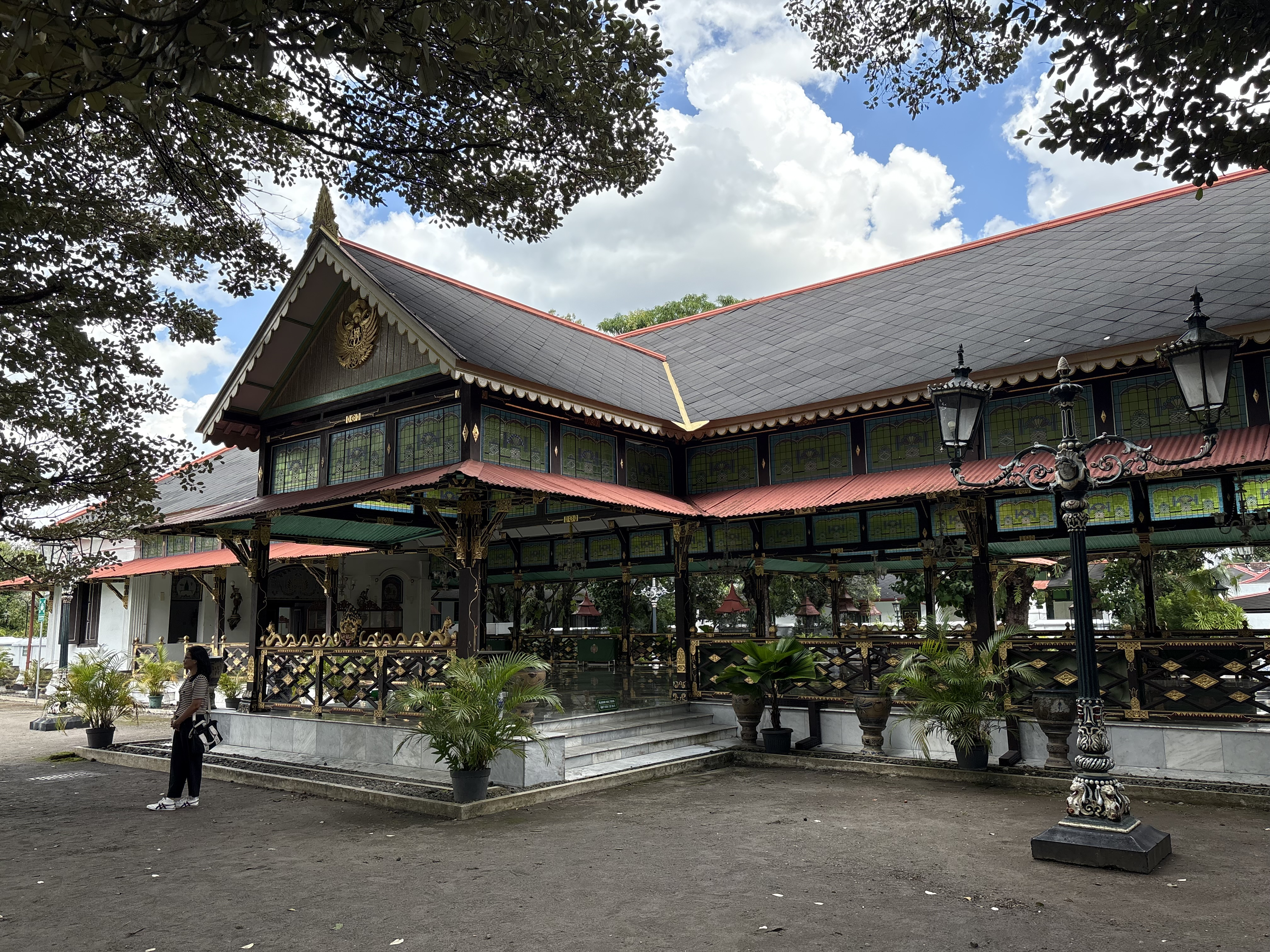
Bangsal Manis

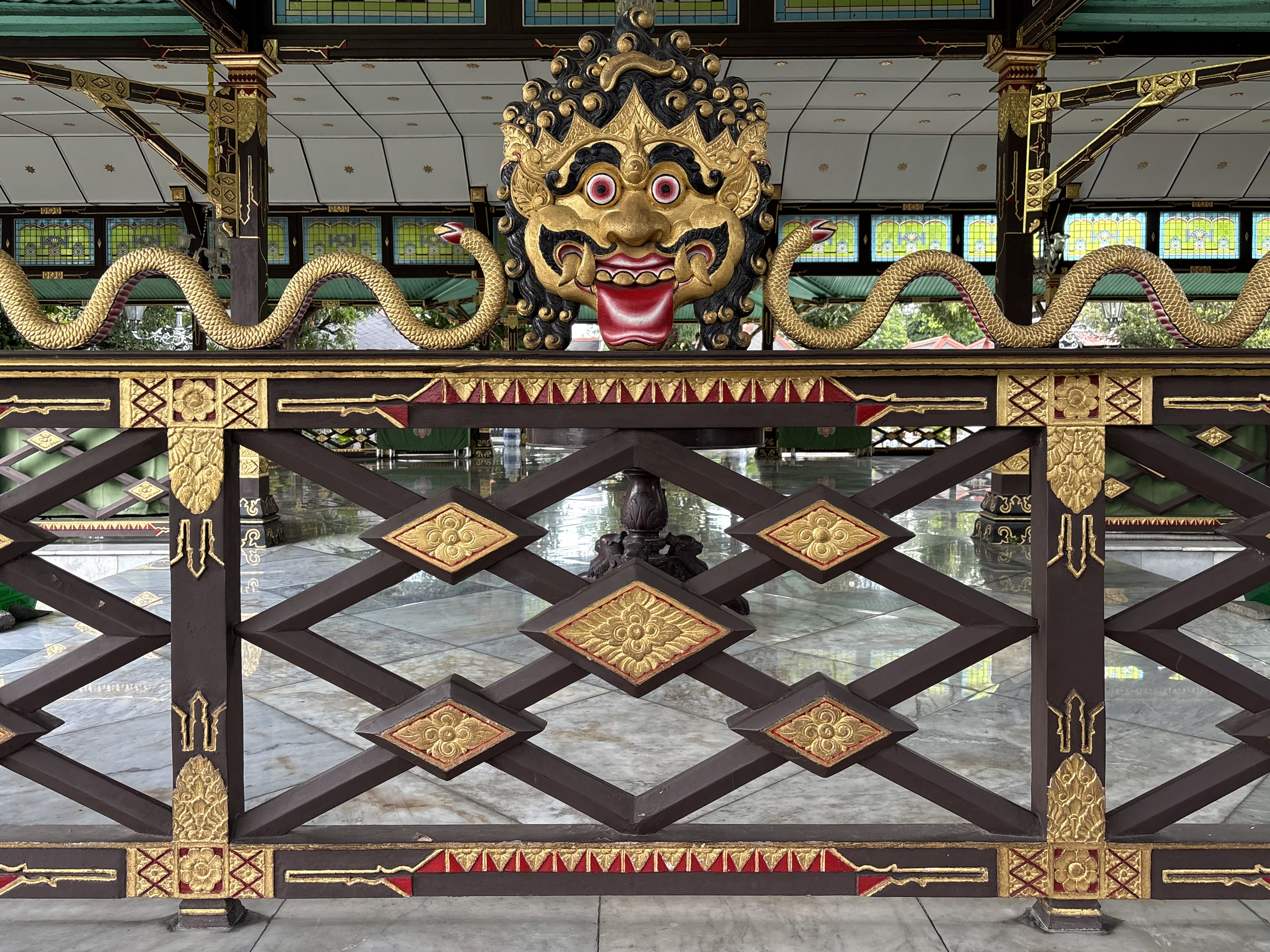
A railing in Bangsal Manis with Javanese Kāla

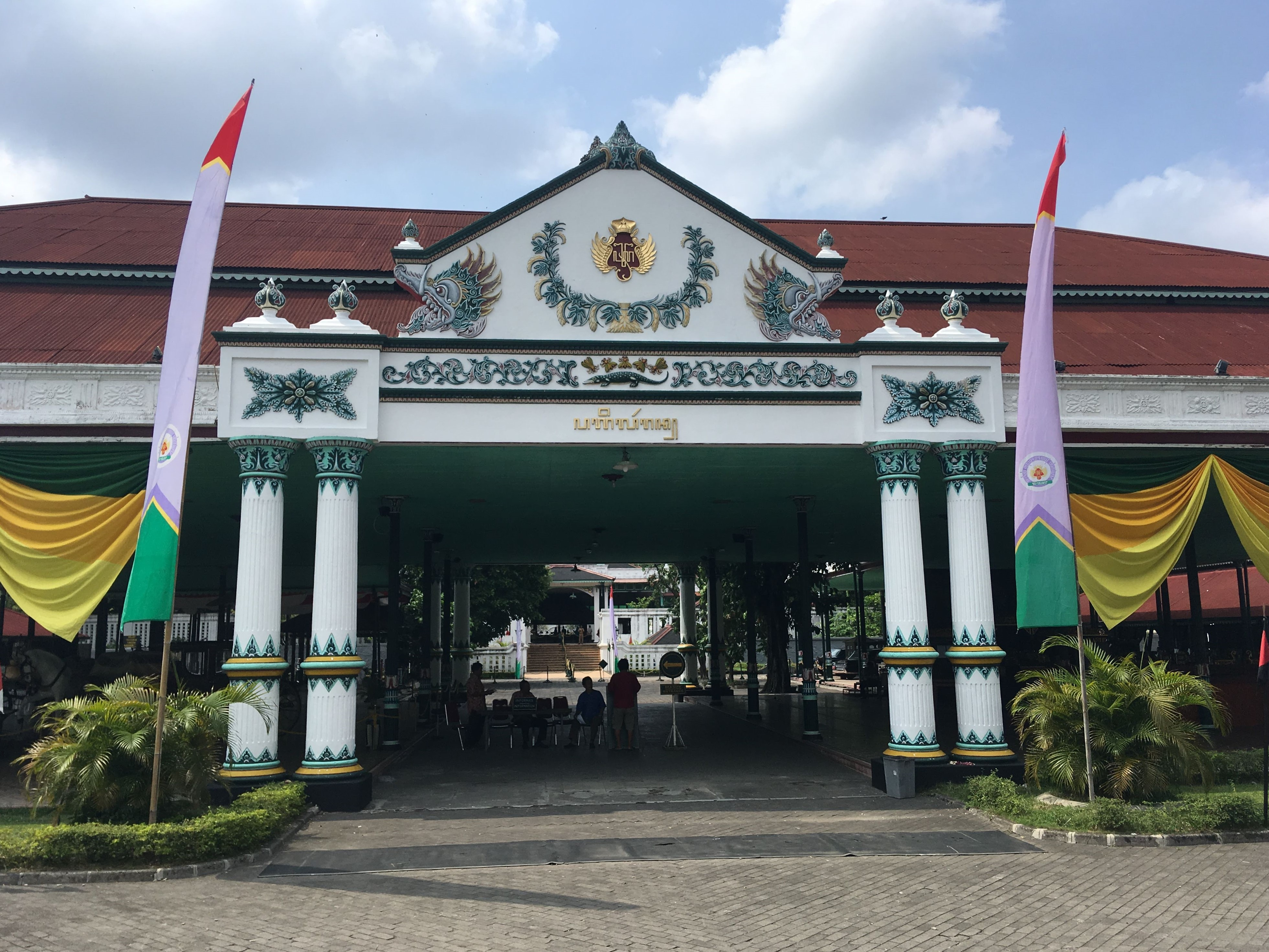
Bangsal Pagelaran

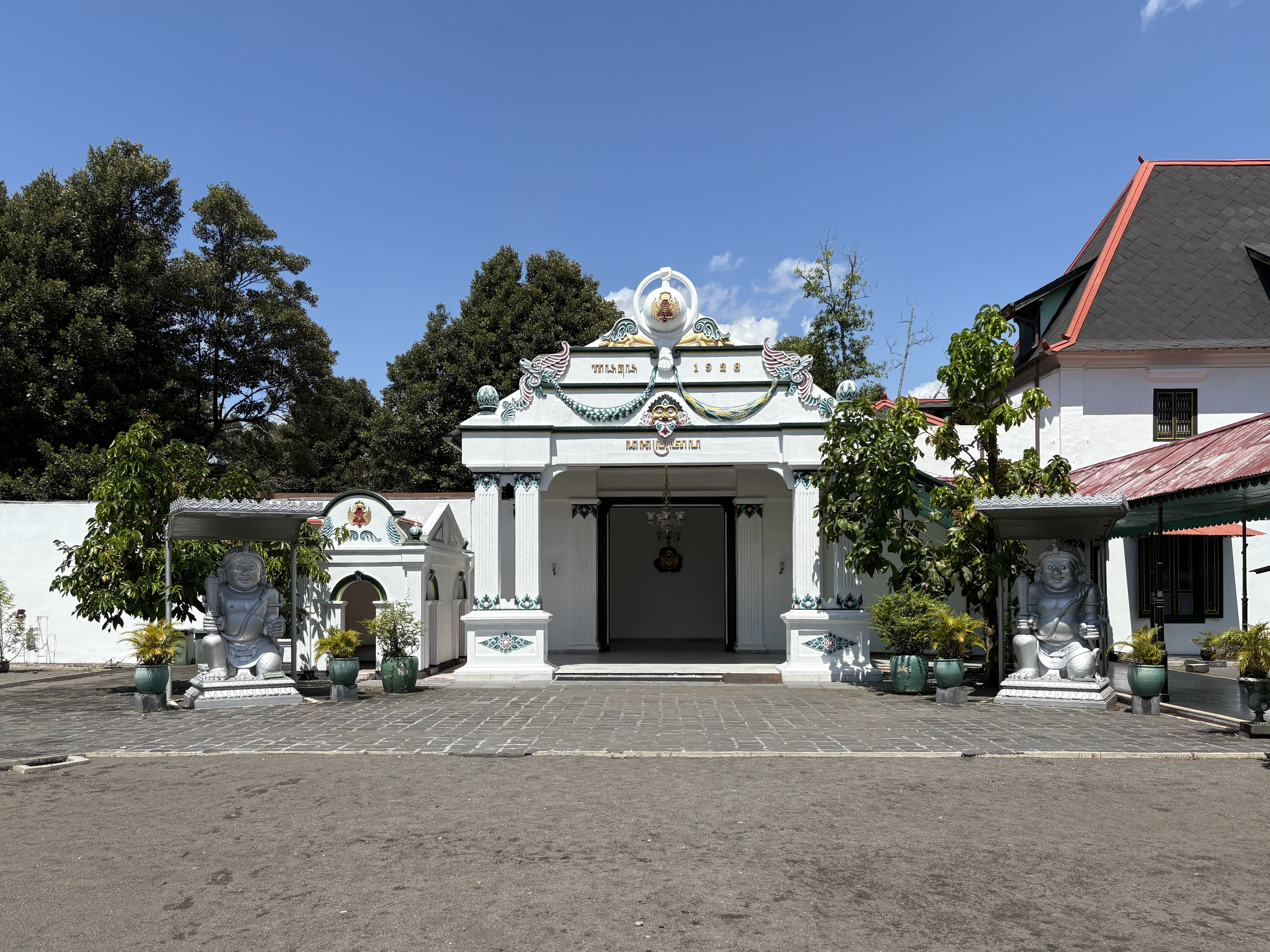
Donopratono Gate with the two Dvarapala

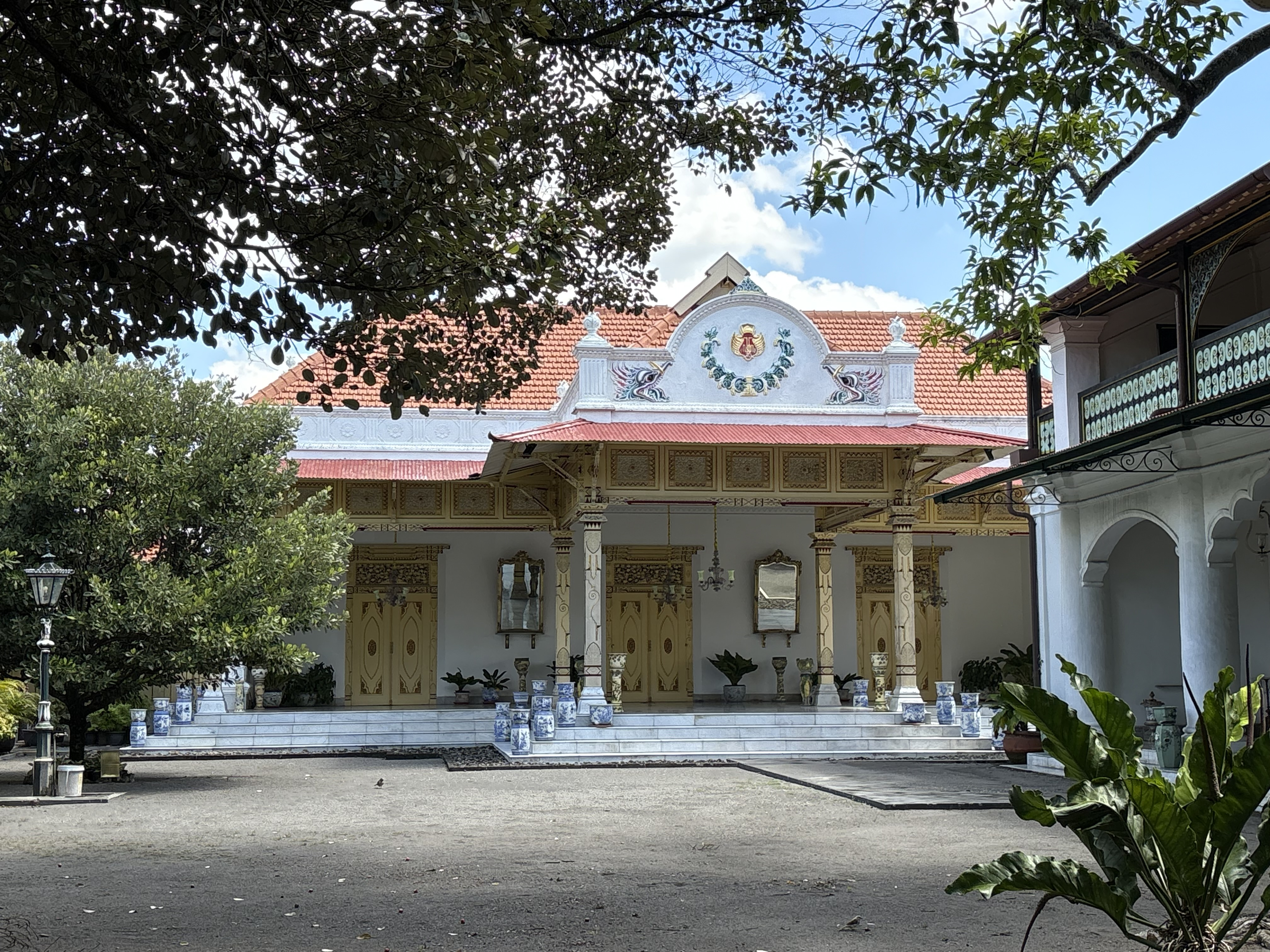
Gedhog Jene or the Yellow Building

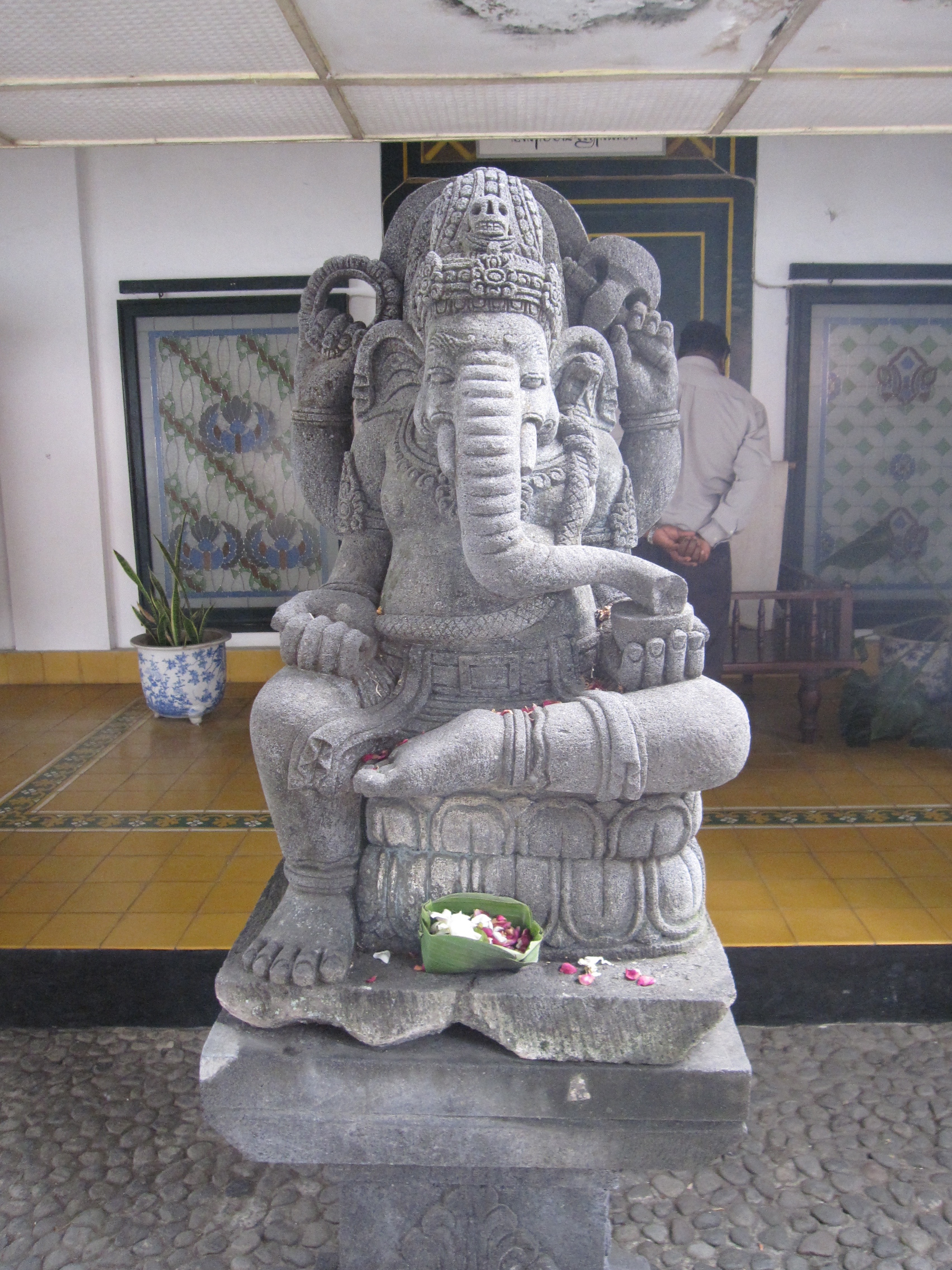
A Ganesha statue

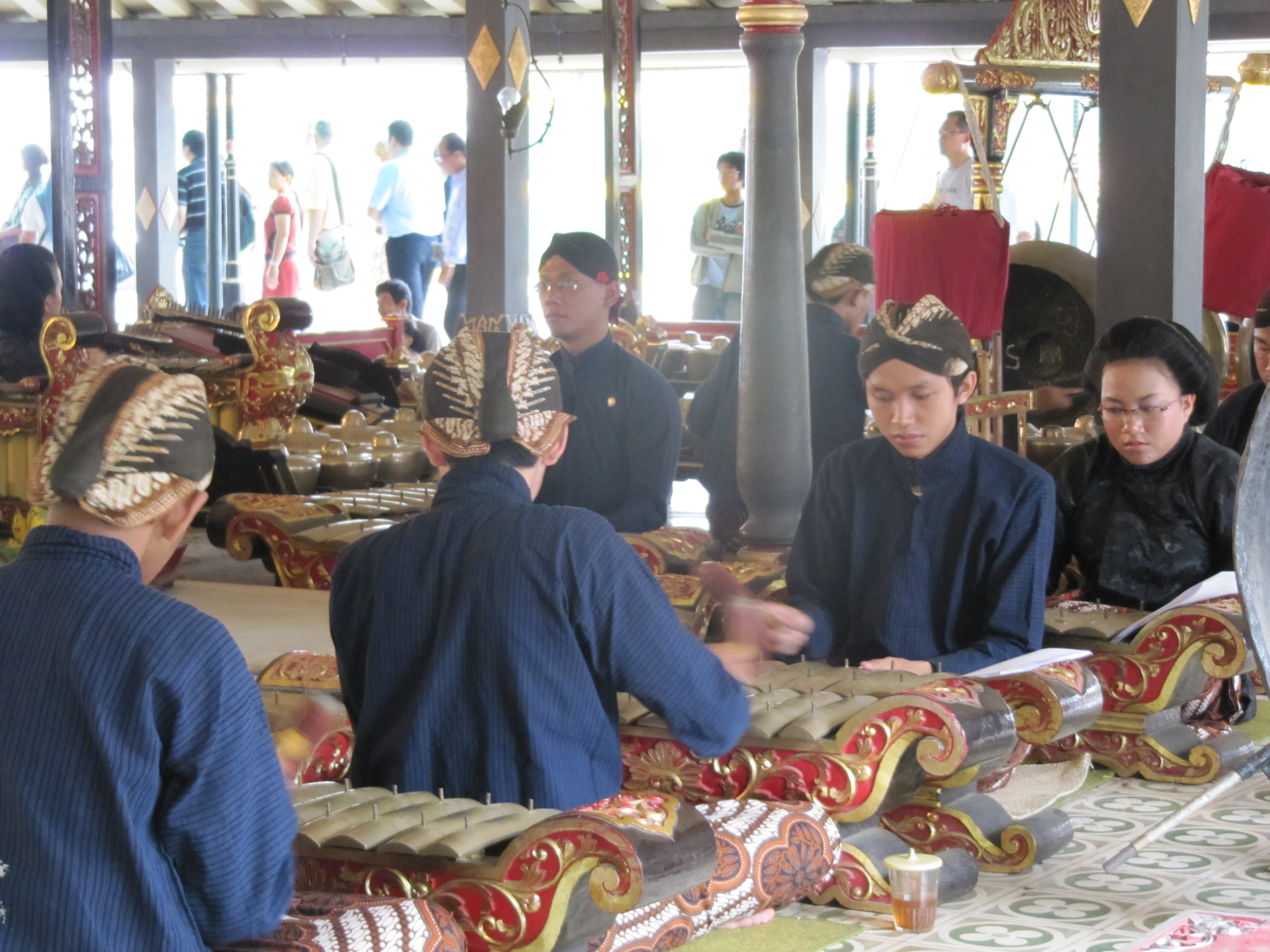
Gamelan performance

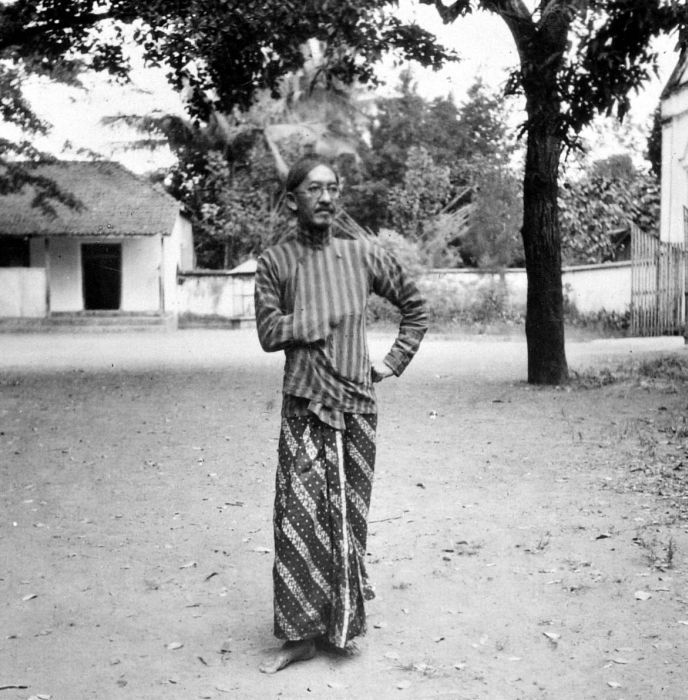
R.M. Djajadipoera architect of the Keraton of Yogyakarta

== See also ==
- List of monarchs of Java
- Fort Vredeburg
- Gedung Agung
- Taman Sari (Yogyakarta)
- List of palaces in Indonesia
