= Princess Condrokirono =

Princess of Yogyakarta (born 1975)

Condrokirono
- Her Royal Highness Princess of Yogyakarta
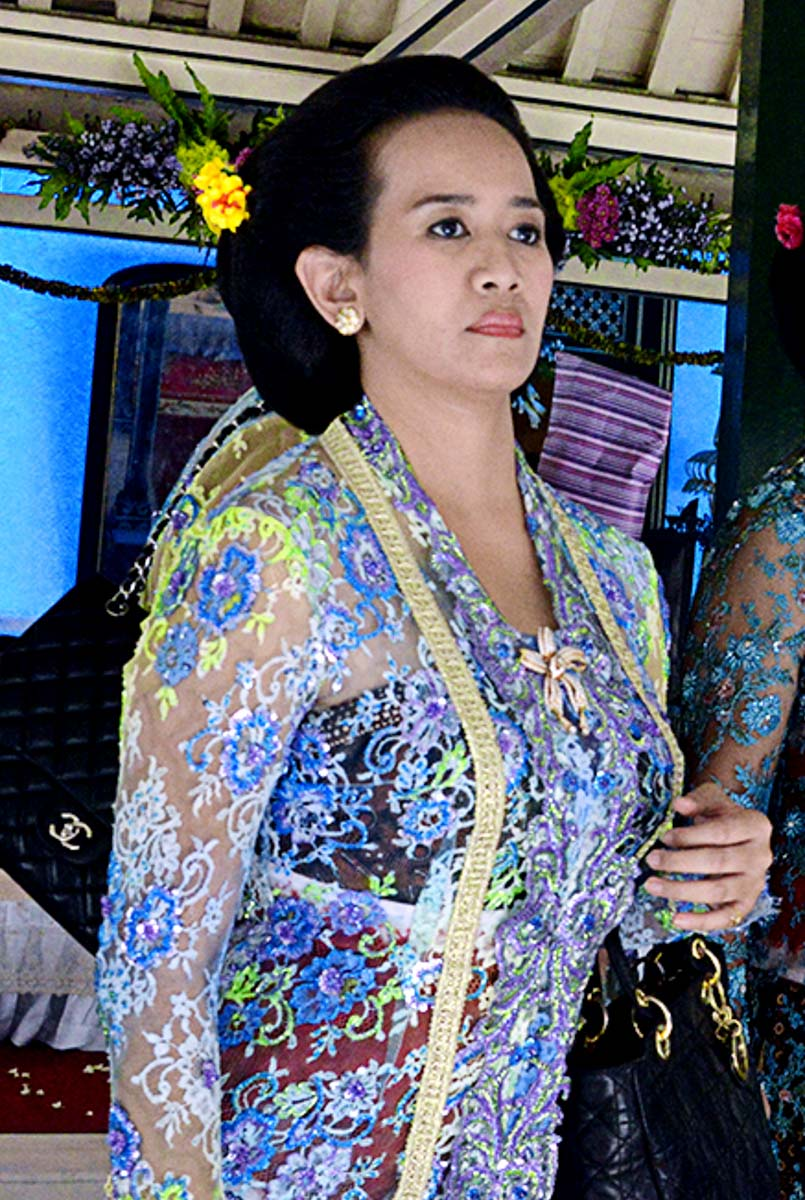
- Condrokirono in 2013.
- Born: Raden Ajeng Nurmagupita; 2 February 1975 (age 51); Yogyakarta, Special Region of Yogyakarta, Indonesia
- Spouse: Erry Triawan (m. 1993; div. 2007)
- Issue: Gusthilantika Marrel Suryokusumo
- House: Hamengkubuwono
- Dynasty: Mataram
- Father: Hamengkubuwana X
- Mother: Ratu Hemas
- Religion: Islam
- Education: Charles Sturt University (BBus)

Princess Condrokirono of Yogyakarta (born 2 February 1975) is a member of the royal family of the Yogyakarta Sultanate. She is the second daughter of Hamengkubuwana X, the reigning monarch of Yogyakarta, and his queen consort, Ratu Hemas.

== Early life and education ==
Nurmagupita was born on 2 February 1975 in the Special Region of Yogyakarta, Indonesia. In her childhood, Nurmagupita, along with her parents, her older sister, and her younger sister, lived in Pesanggrahan Ngeksiganda in Kaliurang, Pakem, Sleman Regency. Between the late 1970s and early 1980s, as her father became increasingly occupied with royal duties and her mother began her involvement in politics and philanthropy, the family, along with several royal relatives, decided to move to the residential complex of the Madukismo Sugar and Spirit Factory in Kasihan, Bantul Regency. During this period, her mother gave birth to her two youngest sisters, Nurabra Juwita and Nurastuti Wijareni.

In February 1989, Nurmagupita and her family left Madukismo to reside permanently in the Yogyakarta Kraton. This move coincided with a major shift within her family: following the passing of her grandfather Hamengkubuwana IX, her father—who had been presumed to be the primary heir to the Yogyakarta succession—was enthroned as the successor to the Yogyakarta Sultanate, while her mother was crowned as queen consort on 7 March 1989. From that point onward, Nurmagupita grew up and lived her daily life as part of the immediate family of the ruler of the Yogyakarta Kraton.

Nurmagupita completed her primary and secondary education in Yogyakarta. She spent two years of upper secondary education in Yogyakarta before moving to Singapore to continue her studies at the ISS International School (ISS) with the support of her parents. After graduating from ISS, she pursued higher education in Australia, enrolling in the Finance program at Charles Sturt University in New South Wales; however, after one semester, she switched her major to Business within the same faculty until she earned a Bachelor of Business (BBus) degree.

== Personal life ==
In 1993, Nurmagupita married rally driver Erry Triawan, who was subsequently granted the title Kanjeng Raden Tumenggung (KRT) Suryokusumo. She became the first daughter of Hamengkubuwana X to wed, preceding her older sister Nurmalitasari (later known as Princess Mangkubumi). Their wedding marked the first Dhaup Ageng (royal wedding ceremony) held by the court since her father's enthronement. Following her marriage, she assumed a title based on her husband's name, Gusti Raden Ayu (GRAy) Suryokusumo. From this marriage, Raden Mas Gustilantika Marrel Suryokusumo was born on 17 June 1994.

After nearly a decade of marriage, Nurmagupita and Erry divorced in 2007 for reasons that were not made public. Following the divorce, Nurmagupita continued to use her name and title as Gusti Raden Ayu Suryokusumo until her father granted her a new title through a wisudan (investiture) ceremony during the Tumbuk ageng celebrations in 2008.

== Court career and roles ==
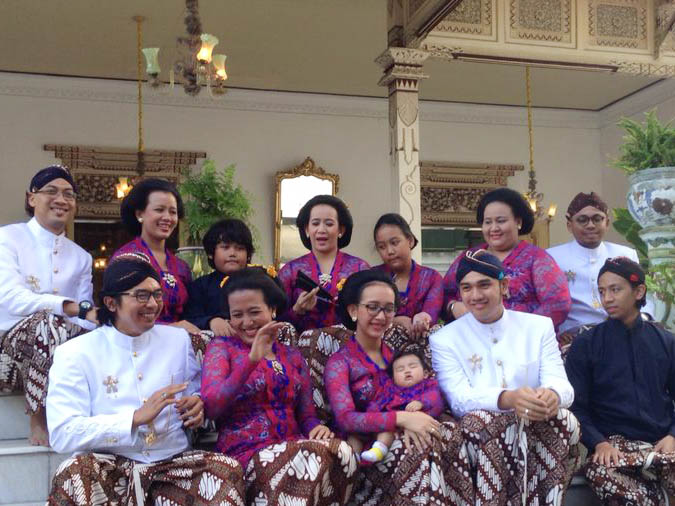
Condrokirono (center-top) along with her older sister's family and her younger sisters at the Keraton Yogyakarta.

Condrokirono holds a central role within the organizational structure of the Keraton Ngayogyakarta Hadiningrat, particularly in her capacity as the Penghageng Kawedanan Hageng Panitrapura. This position, which is equivalent to the Court Secretariat, carries the primary responsibility of managing all internal administration, correspondence, public relations, and human resources management within the palace. Panitrapura functions as the official communication gateway, receiving and dispatching all external and internal correspondence to the various departments (tepas/kawedanan) operating under the palace.

Condrokirono's involvement in the court administration began with her appointment as Vice Penghageng in 2011, alongside her four sisters. Following the passing of GBPH Joyokusumo, she was officially appointed as Penghageng. Beyond managerial duties, she is actively involved in preserving and performing court rituals, such as her role in the ngapem ceremony (baking rice cakes), which constitutes an integral part of the Tingalan Jumenengan Dalem (the anniversary of the Sultan's accession to the throne). Although high leadership positions within the palace have traditionally been held by men, Condrokirono carries out these obligations as part of her duties as a putri dalem (daughter of the king).

Outside the palace, Condrokirono is active in various social and youth organizations in the Special Region of Yogyakarta (DIY). She served as the Chairperson of Karang Taruna (youth organization) for the Special Region of Yogyakarta for two consecutive leadership terms, including the 2017–2022 period. Additionally, she focuses on social protection issues through her role as Director at Rekso Dyah Utami, a non-governmental organization (NGO) working in the field of women and child protection. Condrokirono has also been recorded as a supervisor at the Indonesian Child Protection Commission (LPA) for DIY.

== Titles and styles ==
From birth, Nurmagupita automatically held the title Gusti Raden Ajeng (GRAj), the traditional title for a king's daughter born to a queen consort prior to marriage. Following her wedding in 1993, her name changed based on her husband's name to Gusti Raden Ayu (GRAy) Suryokusumo; she retained this title even after her marriage ended in 2007, in accordance with court customary rules regarding the titles of noble wives post-divorce.

In 2008, Nurmagupita received a promotion in rank to Gusti Kanjeng Ratu (GKR) Condrokirono. The investiture ceremony was held during the Tumbuk ageng festival celebrating her father's 64th birthday at the Bangsal Kencana, Yogyakarta Palace. During the same ceremony, her younger sister, Nurkamnari Dewi, was also invested as Gusti Kanjeng Ratu (GKR) Maduretno following her change in marital status.

In terms of rank, Condrokirono is one of the Princesses of Yogyakarta belonging to the "ratu" tier, a title granted to the king's daughters from the queen consort upon reaching adulthood, as well as to the queen consort herself. As a daughter of the ruling sovereign, she is entitled to the style of Royal Highness. In palace custom and public social practice, holders of the title Gusti Kanjeng Ratu are generally addressed with the honorific "Gusti" or "Gusti Ratu".
