= Princess Hayu =

Princess of Yogyakarta (born 1983)

Hayu
- Gusti Kanjeng Ratu Hayu
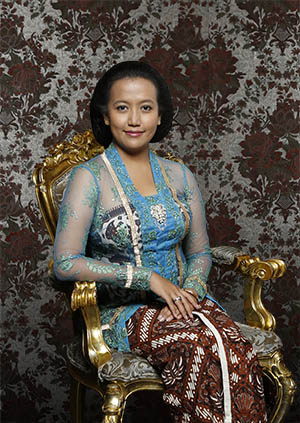
- Wedding portrait, 2013
- Born: Gusti Raden Ajeng Nurabra Juwita; 24 December 1983 (age 42); Yogyakarta, Indonesia
- Spouse: Prince Notonegoro (m. 2013)
- Issue: Raden Mas Manteyyo Kuncoro Suryonegoro
Names
- Gusti Kanjeng Ratu Hayu
- Javanese: ꦓꦸꦱ꧀ꦡꦶꦑꦁꦗꦼꦁꦫꦡꦸꦲꦪꦸ
- House: Hamengkubuwono
- Father: Sultan Hamengkubuwono X
- Mother: Ratu Hemas

Princess Hayu of Yogyakarta (Javanese: ꦲꦪꦸ; born 24 December 1983) is daughter of Sultan Hamengkubuwono X of Yogyakarta and his consort, Ratu Hemas.

== Early life ==
Princess Hayu was born in Yogyakarta on 24 December 1983. She is the fourth daughter of five siblings: Princess Mangkubumi, Princess Condrokirono, Princess Maduretno, Princess Hayu and Princess Bendara. She spent her early childhood mostly in Yogyakarta. One of her particular interests when she was a child were games, mostly puzzles and Lego. In her adolescent days, she also enjoyed sports, especially roller-skating. She competed in a national championship to represent her province in 1992 and won a gold medal.

Princess Hayu attended junior high school in Australia for a year before returning to Indonesia. She then continued her studies at SMAN 3 Padmanaba Highschool Yogyakarta, a high school that was also attended by her future husband Prince Notonegoro. After spending a year in Padmanaba Highschool, she moved to Singapore and went to the International School of Singapore.

Following her graduation from high school, Hayu decided to study Information Technology. She took a Computer Science Major at Stevens Institute of Technology, in the US, before moving to Bournemouth University in England to study Design and IT Project Management.

== Marriage ==
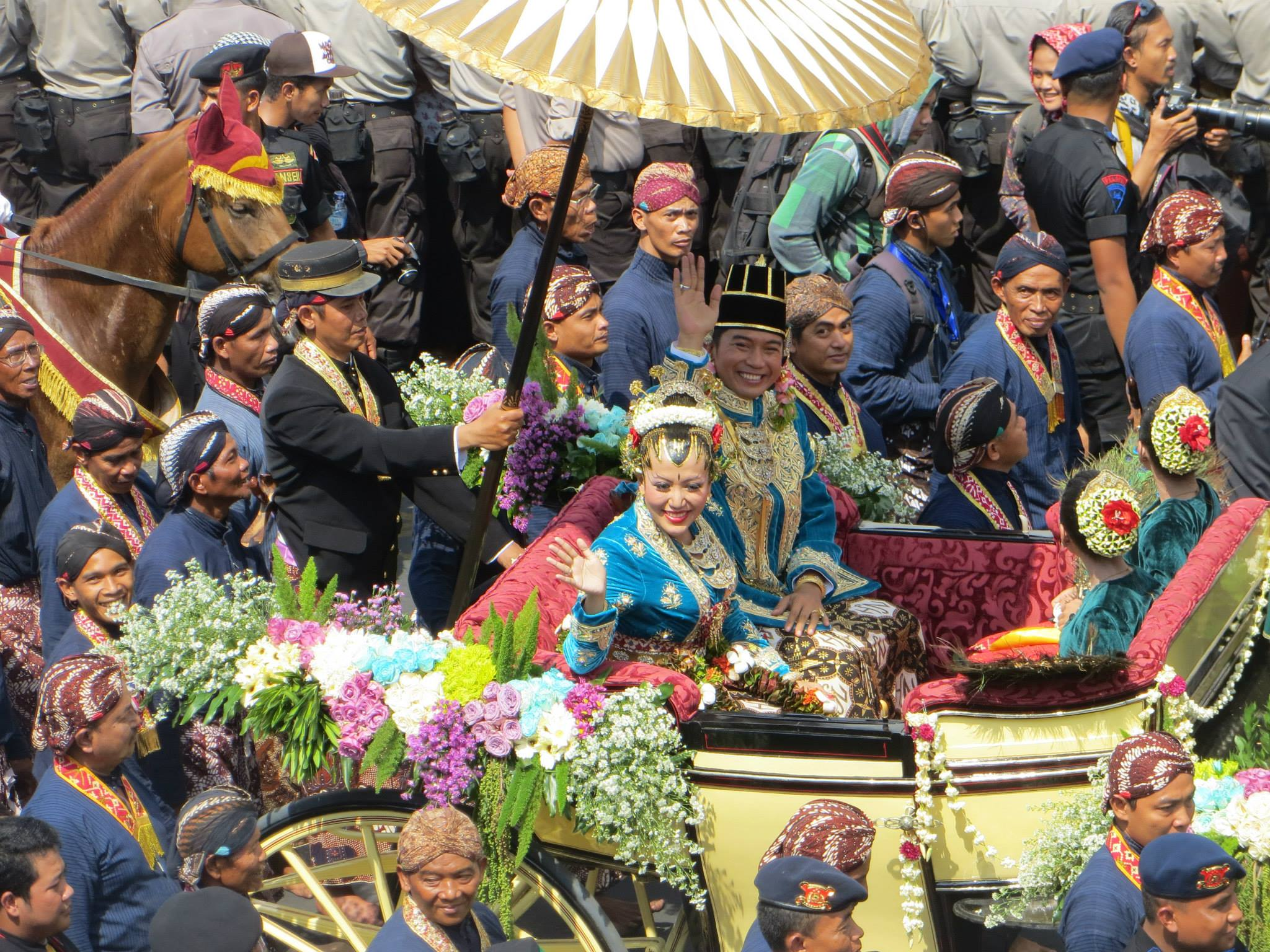
Princess Hayu and Prince Notonegoro in a royal parade during their wedding in October 2013.

She is married to Prince Notonegoro, an executive in the United Nations Development Programme Indonesia and a professional in the United Nations, New York, United States.

Hayu's marriage to Prince Notonegoro received heavy public attention since the engagement was announced on 20 June 2013. The couple had been dating for 10 years and knew each other from a young age as their respective mothers are friends. Hayu's mother Ratu Hemas requested Noto to help her daughter when she started attending college in the US. Notonegoro, who was pursuing graduate studies in the US at that time, met the princess in New York and the romance began there.

Since Hayu was the last of her parents' children to get married, the wedding was arranged as a cultural event for the people in Yogyakarta. While the previous royal weddings only involved a parade of five royal horse carriages, Hayu's wedding had twelve horse carriages to transport all the members of the Royal Family of Yogyakarta. The wedding also managed to boost tourism in Yogyakarta which is a touristic destination in the first place.

On 22 October 2013, Princess Hayu was officially married to Prince Notonegoro. The royal wedding in Yogyakarta Palace was conducted over three consecutive days. Thousands of guests attended the royal wedding including the President of the Republic of Indonesia Mr. Susilo Bambang Yudhoyono.

Consistent with the Muslim tradition, the wedding solemnisation ritual Ijab qabul was conducted by the Sultan himself without the presence of the bride. The wedding vow was conducted in archaic Javanese language, which translated as: "I, Prince Notonegoro, today carry out Your Majesty's command to marry your daughter Gusti Kanjeng Ratu Hayu with the Holy Quran and a set of prayer outfits as a dowry."

At the culmination of the wedding Princess Hayu and Prince Notonegoro were paraded in the city. Thousands of people turned out to witness this parade.

On August 18, 2019, Princess Hayu gave birth to their first child, a baby boy named Raden Mas Manteyyo Kuncoro Suryonegoro.

== Professional experience ==
Following her graduation from college, Princess Hayu worked at a software house in Jakarta as a project manager for internet banking. After three years in this business, she moved to her hometown Yogyakarta and became a game producer for Gameloft, a global game company. She is now also serving as the chief of Tepas Tandha Yekti, a new department in the Palace which manages IT and documentation affairs.

Hayu's figure as a professional worker has changed people's perceptions about the role and status of women in the Javanese royal court. Princess Hayu is seen as a modern independent woman which negates the image of woman being subservient in Javanese culture especially among royals.

Hayu's professional career

- 2007-2008: Microsoft Indonesia – Internship Programme
- 2009-2012: Aprisma Indonesia – Project Manager
- 2012-2013: Gameloft Indonesia – HD Game Producer
- 2012–present: Tepas Tandhayekti – Penghageng (Chief)
