= Princess Mangkubumi =

Crown Princess of Yogyakarta (born 1972)

Mangkubumi (Note: Javanese: ꦓꦸꦱ꧀ꦡꦶꦑꦁꦗꦼꦁꦫꦡꦸꦩꦁꦑꦸꦨꦸꦩꦶ)
- Crown Princess of Yogyakarta
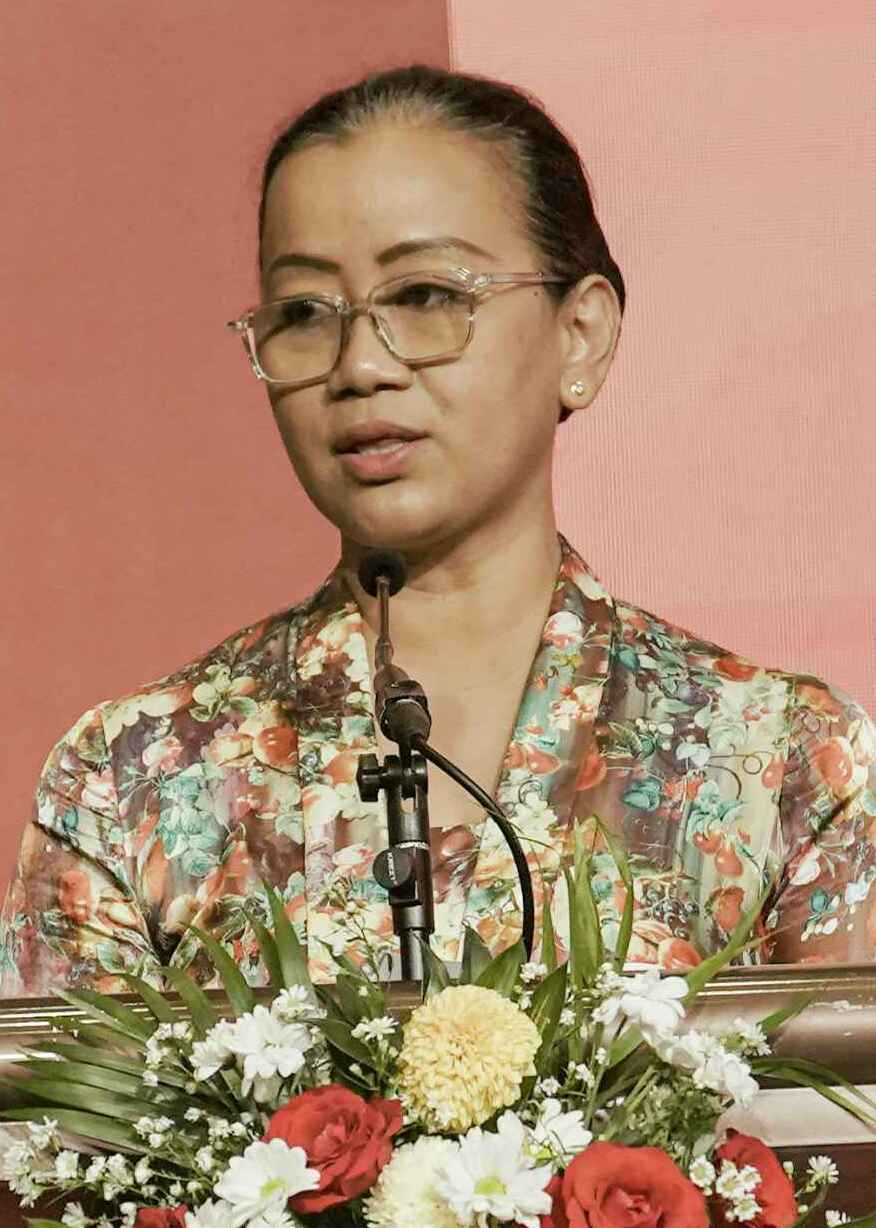
- Crown Princess Mangkubumi in 2025.
- Born: 24 February 1972 (age 54); Bogor, West Java, Indonesia
- Spouse: Prince Wironegoro
- Issue: Raden Ajeng Artie Ayya Fatimasari; Raden Mas Drasthya Wironegoro
Names
- Gusti Kanjeng Ratu Mangkubumi Hamemayu Hayuning Bawono Langgeng ing Mataram
- House: Hamengkubuwono
- Father: Hamengkubuwono X, Sultan of Yogyakarta
- Mother: Ratu Hemas

Mangkubumi, Crown Princess of Yogyakarta (full name: Her Royal Highness Princess Mangkubumi Hamemayu Hayuning Bawana Langgeng ing Mataram; Javanese: ꦩꦁꦑꦸꦨꦸꦩꦶ, Gusti Kanjeng Ratu Mangkubumi, born as Gusti Raden Ajeng Nurmalitasari on 24 February 1972, later known as Gusti Kanjeng Ratu Pembayun) is the first child and daughter of Sultan Hamengkubuwono X of Yogyakarta and his consort, Queen Hemas. On 5 May 2015 she was proclaimed Crown Princess by her father. She married Prince Wironegoro, a businessman and philanthropist. She will become the first Sultanah of Yogyakarta, once she succeeds her father.

== Early life and education ==
Mangkubumi was born in Bogor on 24 February 1972. She is the first of five siblings. She spend her early childhood mostly in Yogyakarta. She went to BOPKRI 1 high school and continued her high school education in ISS International School in Singapore. She attended Cuesta College in California until the 1989 Loma Prieta earthquake, changed schools to Citrus College, then completed her undergraduate study in Griffith University in Brisbane, Australia.

On June 28, 2023, Mangkubumi received an honorary doctoral degree in human letters from the Northern Illinois University.

== Marriage ==
Mangkubumi married Prince Wironegoro on 28 May 2002. Because she is the firstborn child of her father, the marriage attracted much public attention. The Javanese rituals and ceremonies in this wedding have also been codified as future reference for the wedding of her younger siblings.

Before the wedding, in line with the palace tradition, new name and title were bestowed by the Sultan to the first princess. Previously known as Gusti Raden Ajeng Nurmalitasari, the Princess was dubbed Gusti Kanjeng Ratu Pembayun (the equivalent of Princess Royal) the customary title (but not automatically) awarded to the first daughter of the Sultan. This title was bestowed in a ceremony that took place in the palace. In the meanwhile, the bridegroom was also bestowed a new name and title: Kanjeng Pangeran Haryo Wironegoro (Wironegoro). With the new title, the princess also assume new office as the most senior princess who takes precedence over other female family members and relatives of the Sultan. She is charged with the responsibilities to lead all female royal staff.

The wedding ceremonies started with the ritual called "Nyantri", whereby the bridegroom Wironegoro enter the palace on May 27, 2002.

In line with the tradition, The Sultan himself officiated the wedding between his daughter and Wironegoro. The ceremony "panggih" as the main event of the wedding was witnessed by the country's high level officials including the president Megawati Soekarnoputri as well as ambassadors from other countries.

After the panggih ceremonies, both brides and groom were paraded in a kirab ceremony. As the oldest princess, Mangkubumi has to go around the palace wall on the royal carriage Kanjeng Kyai Jongwiyat. This wedding parade has never been conducted since the reign of the 8th Sultan. Therefore, hundreds of thousands of people from around the country come to witness the procession. This wedding ceremony follows hundreds of years traditions and further replicated during the wedding of her younger sisters Maduretno, Hayu and Bendara.

She has a daughter named Princess Artie Ayya Fatimasari Wironegoro (born 3 October 2003) and a son named Prince Drasthya Wironegoro (born 2005). Her firstborn "Artie" went through rites of passage tetesan on 22 December 2013 and tarapan. Both rituals signify her daughter has reached the age of majority.

== Activities ==
=== Wildlife conservation ===
Mangkubumi established the Animal Conservation Center Yogyakarta to protect animals, particularly the orangutan. She works with NGOs, private sector and media from Luxembourg. She is also active in conservation of the Javanese eagle.

=== Youth movement and education ===
Mangkubumi has served as the chairwoman of Karangtaruna in Special Region of Yogyakarta for 10 years (2002–2012) where she directed to organization to harness leadership and improved livelihood of youth. In collaboration with UNFPA and national agency for family planning she is also active on promoting youth reproduction health and gender equality. She sits as honorary board member of the Red Cross Chapter.

As an activist in social works, Mangkubumi has been awarded the honor "Wanita Tak Terpatahkan" (Unbreakable Woman) for her works in empowering women in the remote villages.

In 2015, Pembayun was elected as the head of the Scout Movement for the Province of Yogyakarta. In the interview that took place right after her official appointment, she mentioned her intention to promote Scout Movement in Yogyakarta and widen their outreach. She also mentioned her intention to further promote Scout Movement for disaster preparedness and awareness.

At the beginning of 2012, Mangkubumi present a proposal to establish Yogyakarta as the first "cyber province". This proposal was further revealed when she gave a keynote speech in the Education World Forum. In the same forum she further commit herself to bring mobilize 1 million student for deforestation.

=== Business ===
Apart from being involved in various social activities, Mangkubumi serves as Director of PT. Yogyakarta Tembakau Indonesia which was established to reduce the number of unemployment in the region. She is also director of PT. Yarsilk Gora Mahottama, and President Commissioner of PT Madubaru.

In August 2015 the chamber of commerce of Yogyakarta elected Mangkubumi as the chairwoman. In her inaugural speech she mentioned her vision to advance the economy of yogyakarta by promoting local industry and reducing dependency to foreign support.

Corporate position

- President Commissioner – PT Madubaru (PG/PS Madukismo)
- President Commissioner – PT Mataram Mitra Manunggal (BPR Mataram)
- President Commissioner – PT Yogyakarta Tembakau Indonesia
- President Director – PT Yarsilk Gora Mahottama (Silk Industry)

Roles and positions in organizations

- 2002–2012: Head of Karang Taruna Yogyakarta Province (Youth Organization)
- 2003–2011: Head of BPD AKU Yogyakarta Province (Association to enhance livelihoods)
- 2003–2008: Vice Chairwoman International Association of Wild Silk Moth (based in Japan)
- 2005–2009: Head of Cooperation Aku Sejahtera
- 2006–2010: Head of advisory board Royal Silk Association (Area based development and community empowerment in Karangtengah)
- 2002–2006: Vice Chairwoman Natural Silk Community
- 2002–2006: Vice Chairwoman Handicraft association
- 2006–2010: Chairwoman Wilderness Silk Community Indonesia
- 2006–2011: Head of Market traders association DIY 2006–2011
- 2012–present: Center for Animal Conservation Yogyakarta (PPSJ)
- 2015–present: Head of Scout Movement Yogyakarta
- 2015–present: Head of Chamber of Commerce Yogyakarta

== Royal duties and roles ==
As the most senior princess in the palace, she manages the relationship between the Royal Princesses and other family members and palace staff. Her position also requires her to lead several traditional ceremonies, e.g. Tumpak Wajik, Peksi Burak, and also several rituals and ceremonies during the royal weddings of the younger princesses (Princess Hayu and Princess Bendoro).

In her opinion, the palace as a center of Javanese culture should serve as a filter from the aspects of modernization that are against local culture. At the same time, the palace needs to also open itself more to innovation and technologies. She is also known as an adept traditional Javanese dancer. Together with her sisters Condrokirono, Hayu and Princess Bendoro, they perform the sacred dances of Srimpi and Bedhaya on special occasions.

=== Heiress presumptive ===
On 5 May 2015, following a Royal Decree issued by the Sultan, Princess Mangkubumi (previously known as Princess Pembayun) received the new name Mangkubumi Hamemayu Hayuning Bawana Langgeng ing Mataram. This denotes her as the heiress presumptive to the throne. The title Mangkubumi was formerly reserved for senior male princes groomed for the throne, including the reigning Sultan. The decree thus admits females in the line of succession for the first time in the history of the Sultanate. According to the current Sultan, this was in line with his prerogatives but the move was still criticized by more conservative male family members such as his siblings, who were displaced in the line of succession.
