= Prince Notonegoro =

Notonegoro
- Kanjeng Pangeran Haryo Notonegoro
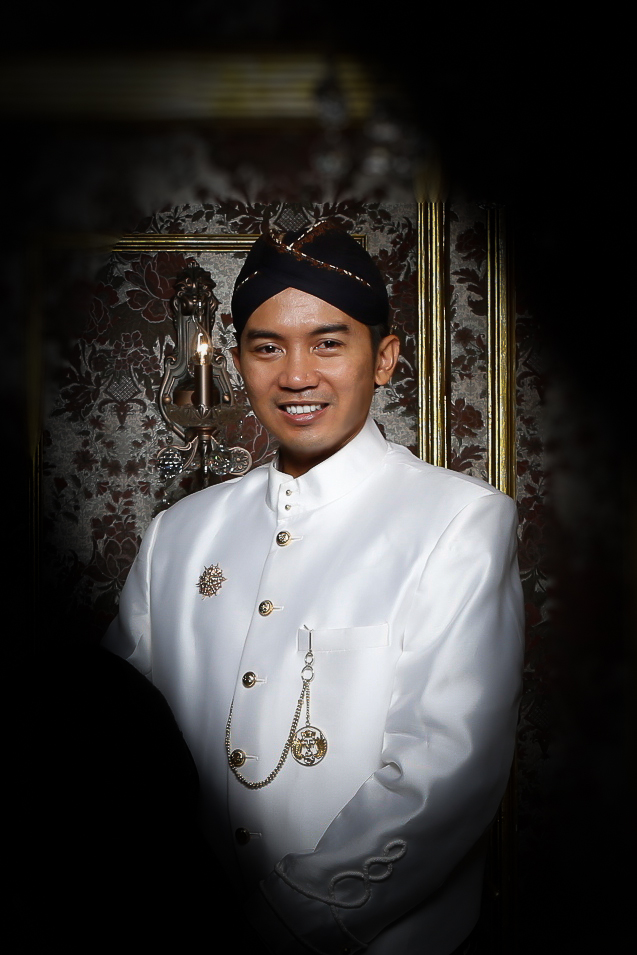
- Prince Notonegoro in August 2013
- Born: Angger Pribadi Wibowo; 27 December 1973 (age 52); Jakarta, Indonesia
- Spouse: Princess Hayu (m. 2013)
- Issue: Raden Mas Manteyyo Kuncoro Suryonegoro
Names
- Kanjeng Pangeran Haryo Notonegoro
- House: Hamengkubuwono
- Father: Colonel Sigim Machmud
- Mother: Raden Ayu Nusye Retnowati

Prince Notonegoro (Javanese: ꦟꦡꦟꦓꦫ) is a member of the Royal family of Yogyakarta of Indonesia as the spouse of Princess Hayu, daughter of Sultan Hamengkubuwono X and Ratu Hemas. He works for the United Nations Development Programme, Apia, Samoa.

== Early life ==
Notonegoro was born "Angger Pribadi Wibowo" from father Colonel Sigim Machmud and mother Raden Ayu (a Javanese royal title equal to Countess) Nusye Retnowati. Born in an Armed Force family, Notonegoro had to have a quite nomadic life due to his parents’ duty. Having been born in Jakarta on 27 December 1973, he spent his childhood in various cities, including Jakarta, Bandung, Tangerang, Cimahi, Ambarawa, Salatiga, and Yogyakarta.

Notonegoro went to the same high school as his future bride, Princess Hayu, in SMA 3 Padmanaba Yogyakarta. While in his high school, the high-tension political situation in the Middle East had drawn his interest to the dynamics of international politics. That was the reason he decided to study International Relations at Gadjah Mada University in 1992. He took that major as he was interested in global issues and international organizations. He also took specialization in Negotiation and Conflict Resolution.

In 2002, Noto continued his study by majoring in International Development at School of Economic Sciences, Washington State University. The reason for taking that major was to expand his knowledge in global issues, particularly development issues including poverty, environment, crisis (conflict/disaster) etc.

== Marriage ==
Notonegoro proposed to Princess Hayu on 20 June 2013. The engagement ceremony received heavy public attention. Noto has been dating Hayu for 10 years. They knew each other from young age since Noto's mother Raden Ayu Nusye Retnowati is friend with Queen Hemas. They started dating in the US when Hayu's mother Queen Hemas requested Notonegoro to help her daughter attending new school in the US. Notonegoro who was pursuing a graduate study in the US at that time, met the princess in New York and that's where the romance begun.

Since Hayu was the last one to get married, the wedding was arranged as a cultural event for the people in Yogyakarta. While the previous royal weddings only involve a parade of 5 royal horse carriages, Hayu's wedding present 12 horse carriages to transport all the member of the Royal Family of Yogyakarta. The wedding also manage to boost tourism in Yogyakarta which is a touristic destination in the first place.

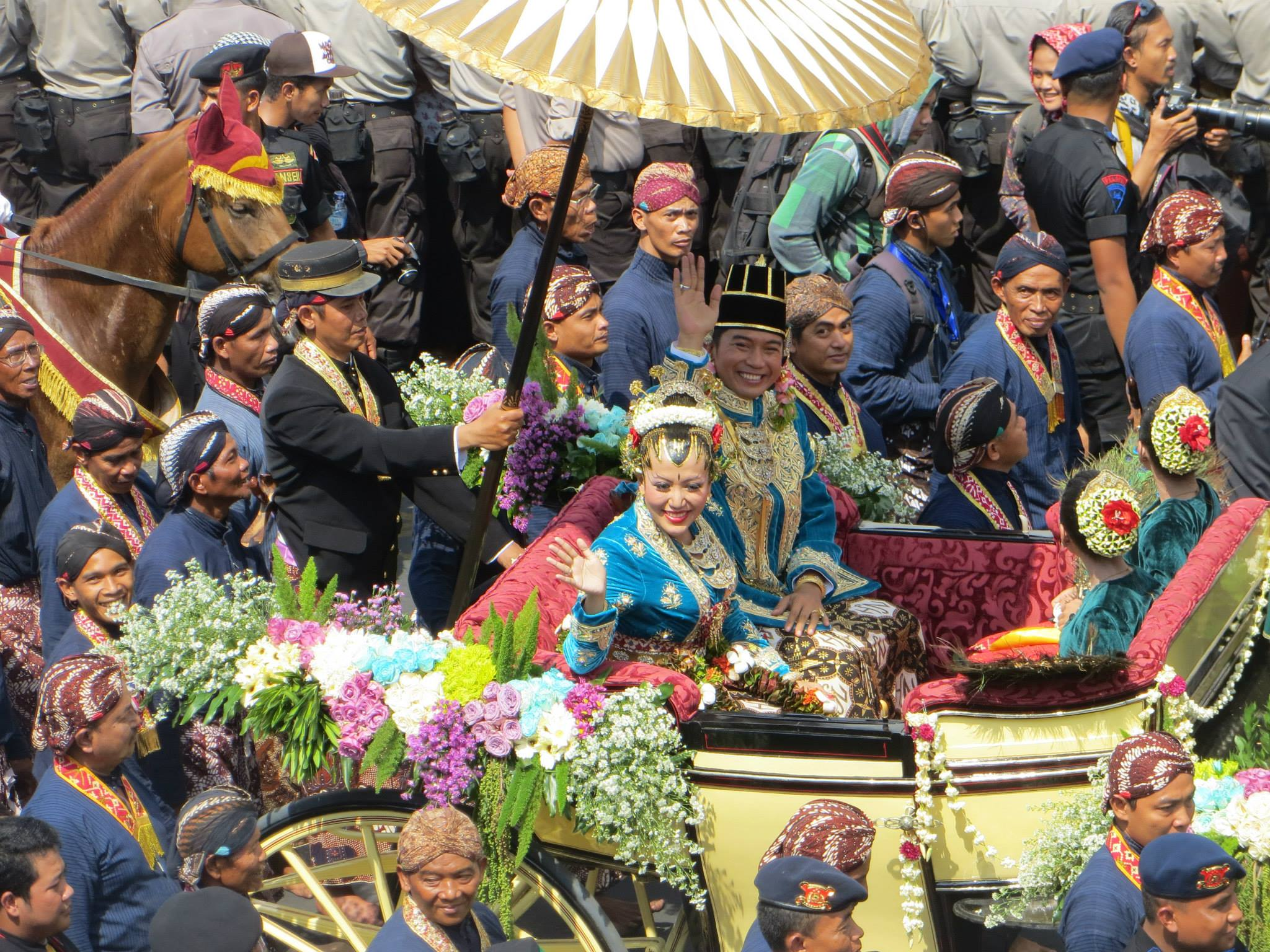
Princess Hayu and Prince Notonegoro in a royal parade during their wedding in October 2013

On 22 October 2013 Princess Hayu was officially married to Prince Notonegoro. The royal wedding of Yogyakarta Palace was conducted in three consecutive days, covering long and various wedding rituals. Thousands of guests attended the royal wedding including the President of the Republic of Indonesia Mr. Susilo Bambang Yudhoyono

Consistent with Muslim tradition, the wedding solemnisation ritual Ijab qabul was conducted by the Sultan himself without the presence of the bride. The wedding vow was conducted in archaic javanese language which translates as: "I, Prince Notonegoro, today carry out Your Majesty's command to marry your daughter Gusti Kanjeng Ratu Hayu with the Holy Quran and a set of prayer outfits as a dowry." Despite his extensive living experience abroad, the prince managed to recite the archaic javanese vow in flawless accent.

At the culmination of the wedding Princess Hayu and Prince Notonegoro was paraded in the city. Thousands of people turned out to witness this parade.

On August 18, 2019 Princess Hayu gave birth to their first child, a baby boy named Raden Mas Manteyyo Kuncoro Suryonegoro.

== Career ==
Notonegoro started his career as a Project Manager for International Marketing in a private company named PURA Group Kudus, before eventually continue his career with the United Nations Development Programme Indonesia. He started working with the UNDP Indonesia in 2006. Initially, he was assigned on disaster recovery programme supporting the tsunami relief efforts in Aceh, during which time he contributed to the establishment of Indonesian Global Compact network. The network, which consist of private companies and civil society has then been active in disaster recovery efforts, including at the time when Yogyakarta was hit by a major earthquake in May 2006.

Notonegoro's career in UNDP continued when he was appointed as Programme Manager for Disaster Risk Reduction. In 2007 UNDP in Indonesia launches its programme "Safer Communities Through Disaster Risk Reduction in Development" to help reduce the risk in the country that was famous for its natural hazards. Three years later in 2011 the President of Indonesia Susilo Bambang Yudhoyono was internationally recognised as the global champion for disaster risk reduction.

Since 2010, Notonegoro has been holding the position of Assistant Country Director, Head of Planning, Monitoring, and Evaluation unit at UNDP Jakarta. During this time, he has served as one of the jury for "Danamon Award" which awards individuals for their innovative entrepreneurship.

Notonegoro is currently assigned as Management Specialist at UNDP New York, US. He is responsible for Business Continuity Management and Enterprise Risk Management in UNDP.

Notonegoro's positions
1999-2003: PURA group Kudus, Project Manager - International Marketing
2003–2004: School of Economics - Washington State University, Pullman, Washington USA - Teaching/Research Assistant
2006–2010: UNDP Indonesia - Jakarta Disaster Risk Reduction - Programme Manager
2010–2012: UNDP Indonesia Jakarta - Assistant Country Director - Head of Planning, Monitoring and Evaluation Unit
2012–2016: Bureau of Management, UNDP headquarter, New York, US - Management Specialist - Business Continuity and Enterprise Risk Management
2016–present: UNDP Multi Country Office for Cook Islands, Niue, Samoa and Tokelau - Deputy Resident Representative
