= Ratu Hemas =

Queen of Yogyakarta since 1989

Hemas
- Her Majesty The Queen of Yogyakarta
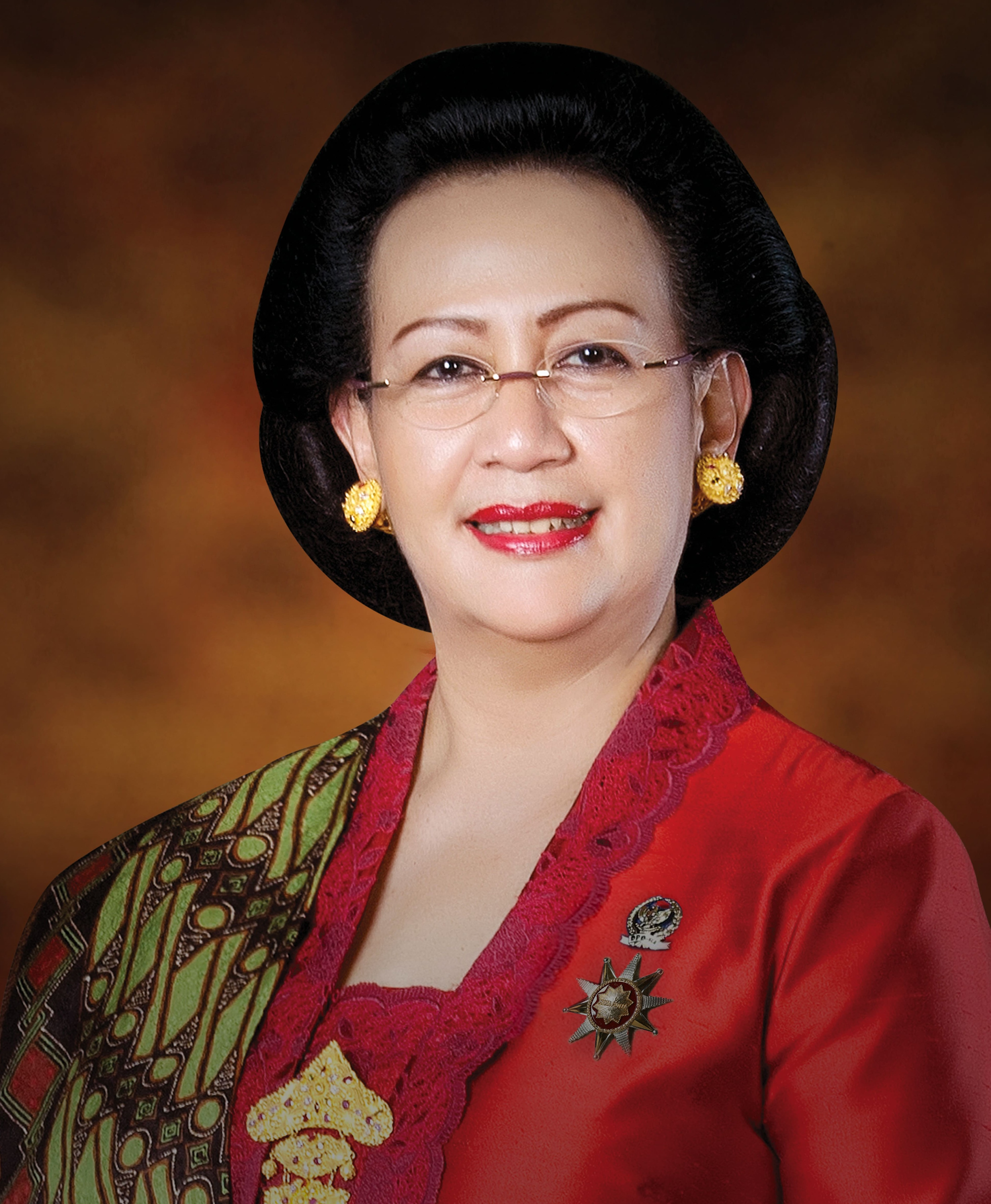

Queen consort of Yogyakarta
- Tenure: 7 March 1989 – present
- Born: Raden Roro Tatiek Drajad Supriastuti; 31 October 1952 (age 74); Jakarta, Indonesia
- Spouse: Hamengkubuwono X (m. 1971)
- Issue: Crown Princess Mangkubumi; Princess Condrokirono; Princess Maduretno; Princess Hayu; Princess Bendara
- House: Hamengkubuwono
- Father: Soepono Digdosastropranoto
- Mother: Soesamtilah Soepono

Deputy Speaker of the Regional Representative Council
- Incumbent
- Assumed office 2 October 2024 Serving with Yorrys Raweyai & Tamsil Linrung
- Preceded by: Nono Sampono; Mahyudin; Sultan Bachtiar Najamudin
- In office 2 October 2009 – 3 April 2017 Serving with La Ode Ida (2009–2014) and Farouk Muhammad (2014–2017)
- Preceded by: Irman Gusman; La Ode Ida
- Succeeded by: Nono Sampono; Darmayanti Lubis

Personal details
- Education: Trisakti University (unfinished)

Hemas, Queen of Yogyakarta (Note: Javanese: ꦒꦸꦱ꧀ꦠꦶ ꦏꦤ꧀ꦗꦺꦤ꧀ꦒ꧀ ꦫꦠꦸ ꦲꦺꦩꦱ꧀, romanized: Gusti Kanjeng Ratu Hemas) (born 31 October 1952) is Queen of the Yogyakarta Sultanate as the wife of Sultan Hamengkubuwono X. She has also served as a senator of the Indonesian Regional Representative Council (DPD) from Yogyakarta since 2004 and Deputy Speaker of the DPD in 2024–2029 period. She served as a Deputy Speaker of the DPD from 2009 to 2017.

== Early life ==
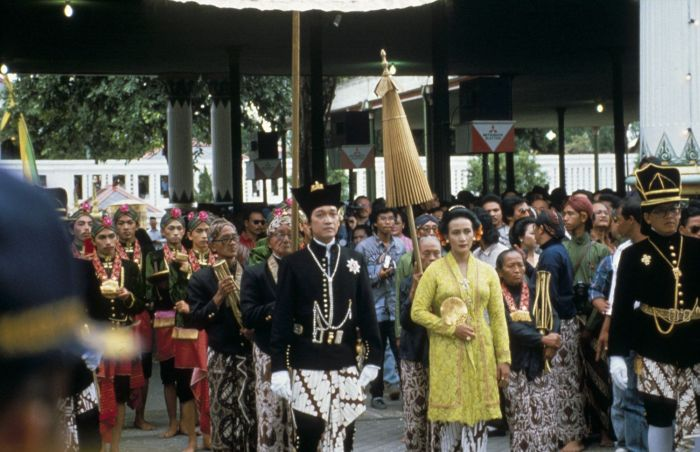
Sultan Hamengkubuwono X's coronation

Ratu Hemas, born as Tatiek Dradjad Supriastuti is the third child and sole daughter of seven siblings. She grew up in Kebayoran Lama, South Jakarta. Her father, Colonel Soepono Digdosastropranoto, was an official in the Indonesia Army who was born in Yogyakarta. Her mother, Raden Nganten Susamtilah Soepono, was a housewife from Wates, Kulonprogo. Hemas went to school in Jakarta until she graduated from High School and continued to pursue her study in the department of Architecture in Trisakti University. She did not finish her studies at the university and was married in 18 May 1973. Hemas then followed her husband to live in Yogyakarta.

=== Meeting the Sultan Hamengkubuwono X ===
Every year, Tatiek's family has a family tradition to go to her grandfather's house in Soronatan, Yogyakarta. Her grandfather was a retired palace official. In the late 1960s, Tatiek met the oldest son of the late reigning Sultan Hamengkubuwono IX, Herjuno Darpito, who, later on, succeeded his father as Sultan Hamengkubuwono X. At the age of 19 Hemas was married to Herjuno Darpito (6 years older) and left her study in the university. Her name was changed for the first time as Bandara Raden Ayu Mangkubumi, before finally being changed to Gusti Kanjeng Ratu Hemas when Herjuno Darpito ascended the throne and became Sri Sultan Hamengkubuwono X. She had five daughters; Princess Mangkubumi, Princess Candrakirana, Princess Maduretno, Princess Hayu, and Princess Bendara.

== Political and social activities ==
- In the beginning, Ratu Hemas' activities in the palace of Yogyakarta were mostly social. She was active in Yayasan Sayap Ibu and the eradication of illiteracy in Yogyakarta. She became a member of People's Consultative Assembly for the period of 1997–1999 from the Faction of Group Representatives (Indonesian: Fraksi Utusan Golongan) and served as the chief editor for Kartini magazine
- Ratu Hemas has always been very active in promoting women's participation in political processes. To further promote women's rights, in 2004 Ratu Hemas ran as a senator for the Regional Representative Council to represent her province, Yogyakarta Special Region, as an independent candidate. She won the majority of the votes from her region.
- In November 2008 during an interview with VIVAnews, Ratu Hemas explained her political view against the Pornography Act. She mentioned that the bill had been drafted in such a way that would restrict women's rights.
- In 2009, Ratu Hemas was reelected again as an independent candidate for the Regional Representative Council for the period of 2009–2014 winning 80% votes from all eligible voters.
- In November 2012 Ratu Hemas together with Laode Ida, I Wayan Sudirta, and John Pieris representing the Regional Representative Council, appealed to the Constitutional Court to run a judicial review on the Law No. 27 Year 2009 and Law No. 12 Year 2011. These laws were considered as violating the clauses of the constitution, especially clause number 22 D concerning equal rights between the Regional Representative Council and the People's Representative Council. In legislation process as of 2012, the Regional Representative Council was granted the authority to provide inputs but not to sanction the law. The Regional Representative Council request the authority to also sanction a law. According to the constitution, the Regional Representative Council has the right to propose a bill and it has exercised this right but has never been deliberated in the house.

== Titles ==
- 1952 - 1971 : Miss Tatiek Drajad Supriastuti
- 1971 - 1989 : Her Royal Highness The Princess Mangkubumi
- 1989–present : Her Majesty The Queen
