= Princess Bendara =

Princess of Yogyakarta (born 1986)

Bendara
- Gusti Kanjeng Ratu
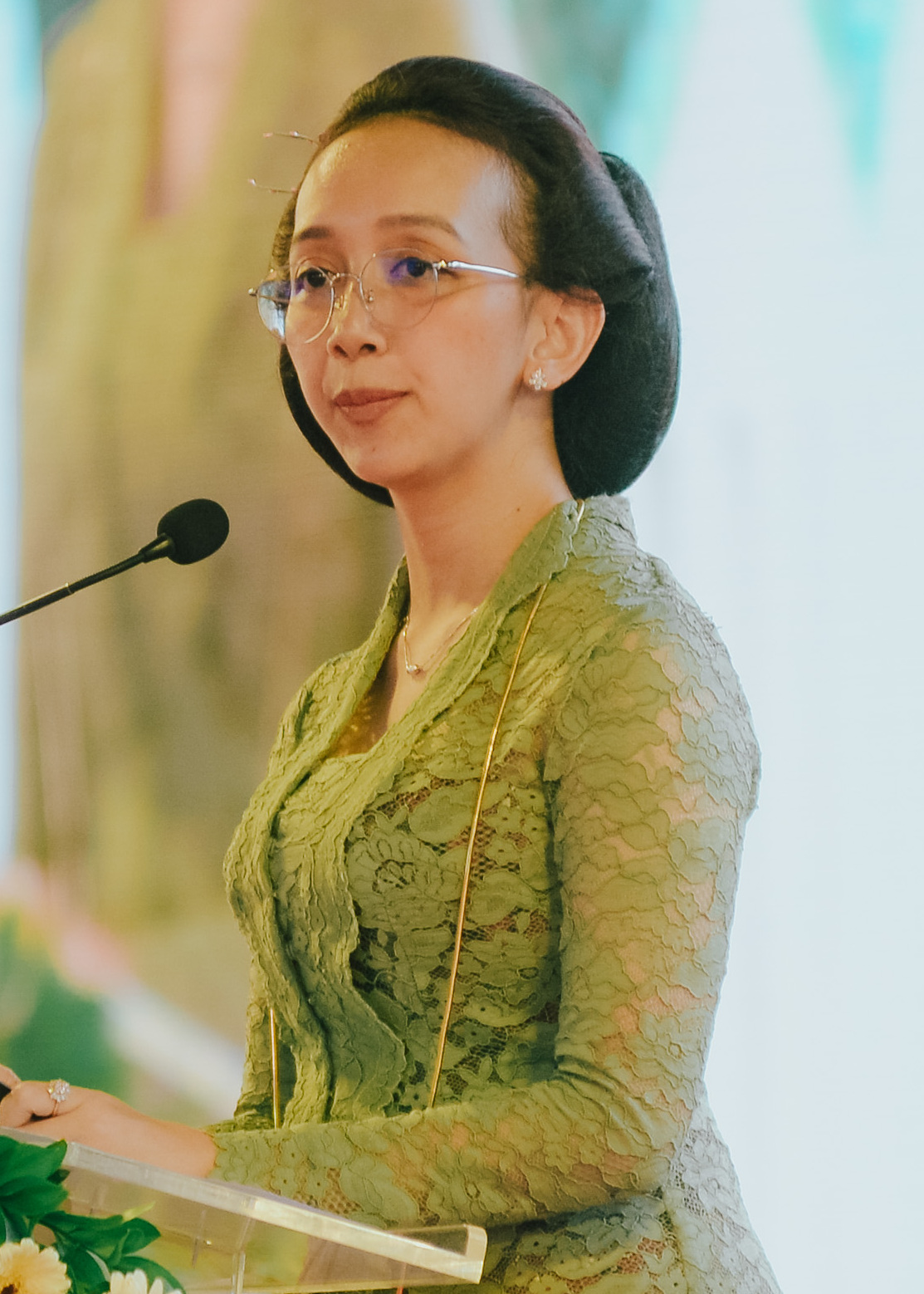
- Princess Bendara in 2025

Miss Indonesia DI Yogyakarta
- Predecessor: Lidya Kharismawati
- Successor: Clarashinta Arumdani
- Born: Gusti Raden Ajeng Nurastuti Wijareni; 18 September 1986 (age 39); Yogyakarta, Indonesia
- Spouse: Achmad Ubaidillah (m. 2011)
- Issue: Nisaka Irdina Yudonegoro; Radityo Mandhala Yudo
Names
- Gusti Kanjeng Ratu Bendara
- House: Hamengkubuwono
- Father: Hamengkubuwono X
- Mother: Ratu Hemas
- Education: Edinburgh Napier University (BA); IMI International Management Institute (MSc)

Princess Bendara of Yogyakarta (Javanese: ꦧꦼꦤ꧀ꦢꦫ; born 18 September 1986), born Gusti Raden Ajeng Nurastuti Wijareni, is a member of the royal family of the Yogyakarta Sultanate. She is the fifth and youngest daughter of the reigning Sultan of Yogyakarta, Hamengkubuwono X, and his queen consort, Ratu Hemas.

== Early life and education ==
Nurastuti Wijareni was born on 18 September 1986 in Yogyakarta. She spent her early childhood in the residential complex of the Madukismo Sugar and Spirit Factory in Kasihan, Bantul Regency. During this period, her father was increasingly occupied with royal duties, while her mother began a career in politics and philanthropy. Consequently, Nurastuti and her four elder sisters were frequently looked after by other royal relatives who also resided in the same housing complex.

Her father, who held the title KGPH. Mangkubumi, was the eldest son of Hamengkubuwono IX and the primary heir to the Yogyakarta Sultanate. Following her grandfather's death, her father ascended the throne as Hamengkubuwono X in 1989, and her mother was crowned queen consort, adopting the title Ratu Hemas. Following the coronation, Nurastuti and her sisters moved permanently into the Yogyakarta Palace in February 1989.

Nurastuti completed her primary and lower secondary education in Yogyakarta. She then moved to Singapore to attend high school, graduating from the International School of Singapore (ISS). Afterward, she earned a Bachelor of Arts (BA) in International Hospitality and Tourism Management from the International Hospitality Management Institute (IMI) in Switzerland. Following her marriage, she pursued postgraduate studies, obtaining a Master of Science (MSc) in International Tourism Destination Management from Edinburgh Napier University in Scotland in 2013 after completing a thesis focused on tourism in Yogyakarta.

== Personal life ==
Nurastuti Wijareni married Achmad Ubaidillah on 18 October 2011 in a traditional Dhaup Ageng (royal wedding) grand ceremony at the Yogyakarta Palace. She is the only daughter of Hamengkubuwono X and Ratu Hemas to marry a commoner without traditional Javanese aristocratic lineage.

Prior to the wedding, Nurastuti and her fiancé were granted official titles by the Sultan during a wisudan ceremony on 3 July 2011 at the Kasatriyan Ward. They were renamed Gusti Kanjeng Ratu (GKR) Bendara and Kanjeng Pangeran Harya (KPH) Yudanegara, respectively. Because she married before her elder sister, Nurabra Juwita, Bendara underwent a traditional Javanese langkahan (stepping-over) ceremony. The wedding sequence strictly followed palace protocols, including the nyantri, siraman (ritual bathing), and tantingan (formal inquiry by the father) rituals.

The marriage vows were solemnized at the Panepen Mosque in High Javanese. Following the ijab kabul, the panggih (royal meeting) ceremony took place at the Kencana Ward, attended by President Susilo Bambang Yudhoyono, Vice President Boediono, senior state officials, and foreign ambassadors. This ceremony included the traditional pondongan ritual, in which the groom lifts the bride as a symbol of deep respect for a king's daughter. The procession concluded with a grand parade toward Kepatihan for the wedding reception. The couple has two children: Nisaka Irdina Yudonegoro and Radityo Mandhala Yudo.

== Career ==
Prior to holding office within the royal administration, Nurastuti began her career as an independent entrepreneur. After finishing her bachelor's studies in Switzerland in 2008, she managed various service and product ventures in Jakarta. She started in travel ticket marketing, transitioned to skincare lines, and eventually expanded into Javanese batik garment trading. She personally sourced fabrics from Yogyakarta and the historic Pasar Klewer in Surakarta, assisted by her then-fiancé Achmad Ubaidillah. They primarily operated retail booths in Blok M Square, South Jakarta.

In 2009, Nurastuti participated in the 5th annual Miss Indonesia beauty pageant, representing the Special Region of Yogyakarta (DIY). The national finale took place at the Jakarta International Convention Center on 5 June 2009, where she advanced into the Top 10 semifinals. Her performance marked the third time the province of DIY placed in the national semifinals, following placements in the 2005 and 2006 editions.

Outside palace administrative duties, Bendara has served as the Operational Director of Nurkadhatyan Spa, a wellness center highlighting traditional Javanese royal palace therapies. Since 2021, she has held the office of Vice Chair III for the National Sports Committee of Indonesia (KONI) DIY chapter. In micro-economic empowerment, she is an active supervisor of local small and medium-sized enterprises (SMEs) under the National Population and Family Planning Board (BKKBN) and oversaw macro-commerce strategies via the International Council for Small Business (ICSB) DIY branch from 2019 to 2024. Furthermore, she chairs both the Indonesian Recreational Park Association (PUTRI) DIY chapter and the Yogyakarta Tourism Promotion Board (BPPD). She serves as a board consultant for the regional Tourism Board and acted as Chief Executive Coordinator for the ASEAN Tourism Forum (ATF) hosted in Yogyakarta in 2023. She also utilizes social media networks to increase public awareness regarding Yogyakarta's cultural ecosystem and tourism destinations.

== Palace administrative roles ==
In 2021, Princess Bendara succeeded her uncle, Prabukusuma, as the Penghageng Kawedanan Hageng Punokawan (KHP) Nitya Budaya. This critical administrative branch within the Yogyakarta Palace oversees the preservation of museums, archives, manuscripts, and royal libraries. In this capacity, she manages historical preservation efforts, leads extensive digitalization initiatives for ancient Javanese court manuscripts, and spearheads temporary historical exhibitions and international scholarly symposiums inside the Kraton grounds. Her official functions also include guiding visiting state delegations and foreign dignitaries through the palace to share the history of the sultanate's collections based on archival logs.

In addition to museum management, Bendara coordinates internal palace protocols regarding the protection and regulation of awisan (traditional forbidden batik motifs) within the palace perimeter. She established standardized educational training for palace tour guides (abdi dalem) and categorizes historical objects for international publications. In executing these cultural missions, she collaborates closely with her elder sister Hayu (head of the digital communications office) and her brother-in-law Notonegoro (head of the performing arts department) to stage public educational programming, including classical Javanese dance workshops and Javanese script training courses.

== Filmography ==
List of film appearances
Year	Title	Role	Genre	Ref.
2013	Dhaup Ageng	Herself	Documentary	

== Titles, styles and honors ==
Born with the Javanese title Gusti Raden Ajeng (GRAj) reserved for unmarried daughters of a reigning Sultan, Javanese custom typically dictates a transition to Gusti Raden Ayu (GRAy) upon marriage. However, ahead of her nuptials in 2011, she was formally elevated directly to the absolute rank of Gusti Kanjeng Ratu (GKR) by her father, choosing the formal name Bendara.

Unlike her elder sisters, who initially held the marital title of Gusti Raden Ayu and assumed their husbands' names before their eventual elevation to Gusti Kanjeng Ratu, Bendara assumed her full senior royal title directly without appending her husband's name. Within palace grounds and Javanese society, bearers of the title Gusti Kanjeng Ratu are formally addressed as "Gusti" or "Gusti Ratu", an honorific title equivalent to "Her Royal Highness".

Awards and achievements
Preceded by Lidya Kharismawati	Miss Indonesia DI Yogyakarta; 2009	Succeeded by Clarashinta Arumdani
