= Hamengkubuwono X =

Sultan of Yogyakarta since 1988

- His Majesty The Sri Sultan of Yogyakarta; The Honourable The Governor of Yogyakarta
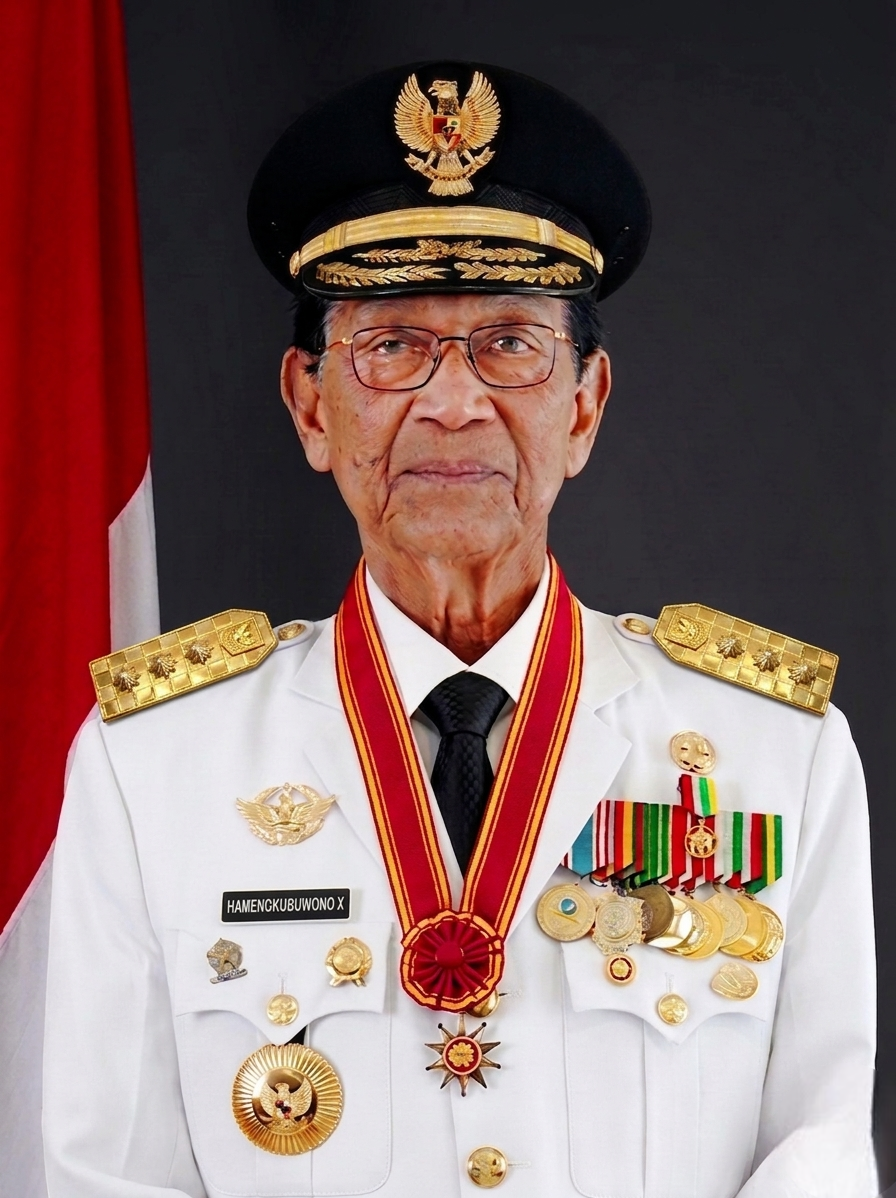
- Official portrait, 2024

10th Sri Sultan of Yogyakarta
- Reign: 7 March 1989 – present
- Predecessor: Hamengkubuwono IX
- Heiress presumptive: Princess Mangkubumi

3rd Governor of Yogyakarta
- Incumbent
- Assumed office 3 October 1998
- Vice Governor: Paku Alam IX (2002–2015); Paku Alam X (since 2016)
- Preceded by: Paku Alam VIII; Soebekti Soenarto (acting)
- Born: Bendara Raden Mas Herjuno Darpito; 2 April 1946 (age 80); Yogyakarta, Indonesia
- Spouse: Tatiek Drajad Supriastuti (m. 1973)
- Issue: Crown Princess Mangkubumi; Princess Condrokirono; Princess Maduretno; Princess Hayu; Princess Bendara
Names
- Ngarsa Dalem Sampeyan Dalem Ingkang Sinuwun Sri Sultan Hamengkubawana Ingkang Jumeneng Kasepuluh Suryaning Mataram Senapati Ing Ngalaga Langgenging Bawana Langgeng Langgenging Tata Panatagama Ing Ngayogyakarta Hadiningrat (Note: Javanese: ꧋ꦔꦂꦱꦣꦊꦩ꧀ꦱꦩ꧀ꦥꦼꦪꦤ꧀ꦝꦊꦩ꧀ꦆꦁꦏꦁꦱꦶꦤꦸꦮꦸꦤ꧀ꦱꦿꦶꦱꦸꦭ꧀ꦠꦤ꧀ꦲꦩꦺꦁꦏꦸꦧꦮꦤꦆꦁꦏꦁꦗꦸꦩꦼꦤꦼꦁꦏꦱꦺꦥꦸꦭꦸꦃꦱꦸꦂꦪꦤꦶꦁꦩꦠꦫꦩ꧀ꦱꦺꦤꦥꦠꦶꦆꦁꦔꦭꦒꦭꦁꦒꦺꦔꦶꦁꦧꦮꦤꦭꦁꦒꦼꦁꦭꦁꦒꦺꦔꦶꦁꦠꦠꦥꦤꦠꦒꦩꦆꦁꦔꦪꦺꦴꦒꦾꦏꦂꦠꦲꦣꦶꦤꦶꦔꦿꦠ꧀)
- House: Hamengkubuwono
- Father: Hamengkubuwono IX
- Mother: Windyaningrum
- Religion: Islam
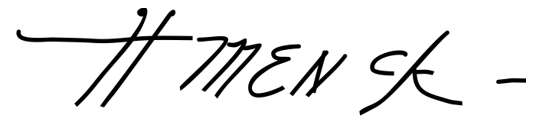
- Signature

Hamengkubuwono X, 10th Sri Sultan of Yogyakarta (Javanese: ꦯꦿꦶꦯꦸꦭ꧀ꦡꦟ꧀ꦲꦩꦼꦁꦑꦸꦨꦮꦟ꧇꧑꧐꧇, also spelled as Hamengkubuwana X, often abbreviated as HB X; born Bendara Raden Mas Herjuno Darpito, 2 April 1946) is the Sultan of the historic Yogyakarta Sultanate in Indonesia. Since 1998, he has also served as Governor of the Special Region of Yogyakarta (Daerah Istimewa Yogyakarta).

Hamengkubuwono X succeeded his father, Hamengkubuwono IX, as the Sultan of Yogyakarta when Hamengkubuwono IX died on 3 October 1988. Hamengkubuwono X was formally installed as Sultan on 7 March 1989. However, the position of the Governor of the Yogyakarta Special Region did not go to Hamengkubuwono X. Vice Governor Sri Paku Alam VIII, prince of the subordinate enclave of Paku Alaman within Yogyakarta, was instead controversially elevated to the position of governor. This was contrary to the agreement made at the time of Indonesia's independence in recognition of Hamengkubuwono IX's support and role in the Indonesian War of Independence. Under the agreement, the Sultan holds the position of governor in the Yogyakarta Special Region, and the Paku Alam holds the position of vice governor.

On 30 August 2012, following a decade of talks between Yogyakarta and the central government, the national legislature of Indonesia formally enshrined in law the convention that the Sultan inherited the position of governor.

== Early life and education ==
Hamengkubuwono X's parents were Sultan Hamengkubuwono IX and his wife Raden Ajeng Siti Kustina (Bandara Raden Ayu Widyaningrum/Kanjeng Raden Ayu Widyaningrum/Raden Ayu Adipati Anum). He was a graduate of Public Administration at the Faculty of Law of Gadjah Mada University in Yogyakarta. He was active as Chairman of the Indonesian Chamber of Commerce and Industry of the Special Region of Yogyakarta, Chairman of the Sports Committee of the Special Region of Yogyakarta, chairman and managing director of PT Punokawan Construction, and President of the PG Madukismo Commissioner. In July 1996, he was appointed Chairman of the Special Region of Yogyakarta Expert Council to the Governor.

The origin of his childhood name came from a wayang tradition traced back to Hamengkubuwono I who prophesied that five of his wayangs will be lost during the reign of Hamengkubuwono II but will come back during the reign of Hamengkubuwono VIII and Hamengkubuwono IX. Three of these wayangs really returned, including a wayang depicting Arjuna was returned to the Sultanate when Hamengkubuwono IX who was not yet enthroned returned home from Netherlands. Moments before Herjuno's birth in 1946, an Ambarawa resident discovered the wayang depicting Srikandi and handed it over to Hamengkubuwono IX with a message to name his son Arjunawiwaha. Hamengkubuwono IX disagreed with the name but he still wished to retain Arjuna in accordance to heirloom signs. From there, he chose the name Herjuno Darpito, a name that reflects the heroic values and nobility of the character Arjuna in the Javanese puppet tradition.

Approaching adulthood, Hamengkubuwono IX gave him the title of Kanjeng Gusti Pangeran Harya (KGPH) Mangkubhumi in 1974, a title associated with crown prince and heir to the throne. Not long after, he was appointed as crown prince with the full title of Kanjeng Gusti Pangeran Adipati Arya (KGPAA) Hamengku Negara Sudibyo Rajaputra Nalendra ing Mataram.

Herjuno finished his elementary school in SD Keputran 1 in 1960. He finishes his junior high school in SMP Negeri 3 Yogyakarta in 1963 and continued his senior high school years in SMA Negeri 6 Yogyakarta, graduating in 1965. He then enrolled as a student in Gadjah Mada University (UGM), graduated with Bachelor of Laws (S.H.) in 1983. The reason for his long period in the university was because he also worked with his father in Jakarta until his father no longer became Vice President in 1977. From 2009 to 2014, Hamengkubuwono X was a chairman of KAGAMA, an alumni association of UGM.

== Life ==
=== Youth and marriage ===
Mangkubumi's youth years marked by the implementation of an educational pattern that emphasizes independence by his father. He was raised not to be given any special privileges inside palace grounds even after reaching adulthood. After graduating from high school, his father gave him a Volkswagen Beetle, but was not given any operational funds for fuel and maintenance. This then made Mangkubumi strided to find his own funds independently. He once worked as a wandering photographer in Yogyakarta. He also opened a batik factory, bamboo furniture factory, and a cow farm. He then enrolled to Gadjah Mada University's Law Faculty.

His first encounter with Tatiek Drajad Suprihastuti was an unexpected one not far from the palace complex. During that time, he was with several friends who wooed him to get to know with Tatiek. Despite reports stating that Tatiek was uncomfortable due to their difference in status, their relationship endured. Both parents consented with the relationship. During the marriage proposal deliverance however, Hamengkubuwono IX did an unusual move to write his own proposal and came to the bride's family with his son to Soepono's residence in Cilandak, South Jakarta, instead of sending an envoy as a stand in.

== Reign ==
=== As Sultan ===
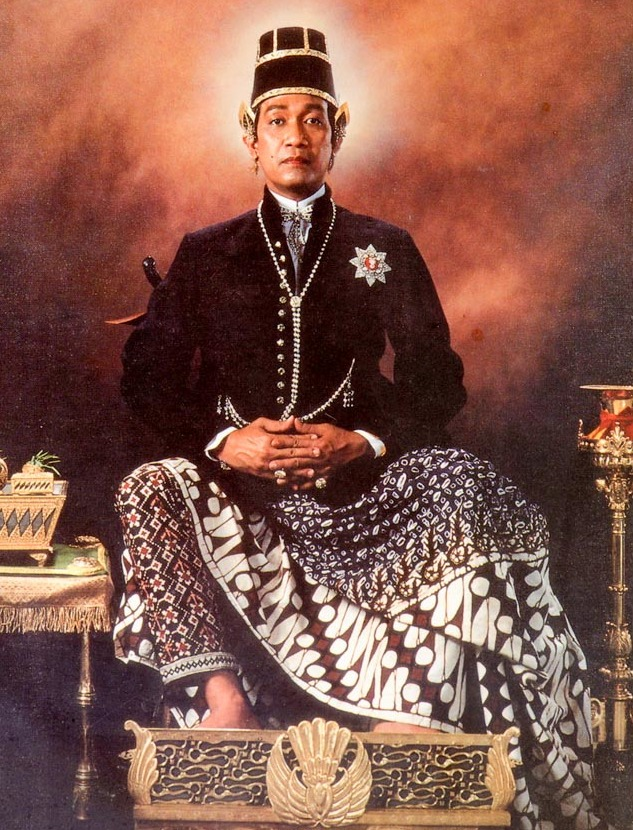
Coronation portrait of Hamengkubuwono X in 1989

Hamengkubuwono X ascended the throne on 7 March 1989 succeeding his father, Hamengkubuwono IX who died in Washington D.C. in October 1988. Hamengkubuwono X discontinued the polygamist tradition as per Hamengkubuwono IX's wishes to modernize the monarchy into the modern society, placing GKR Hemas as his sole wife and queen. His enthronement was the first enthronement of a Yogyakartan monarch in the Republican era. Unlike his predecessors whose enthronement was impeded by colonial permits, the enthronement of Hamengkubuwono X was done independently in accordance to national authority.

Hamengkubuwono X initiated revitalization efforts of cultural properties and culture. He instructed revitalization projects in many different places related to the Kraton, one of which is Fort Baluwerti, a wall structure encircling the palace complex. Hamengkubuwana X also carried out documentation of sacred dances such as Bedhaya and Srimpi, as well as reviving ancient manuscripts for further study. Under his reign, Keraton Yogyakarta also opened itself to innovation through the release of digitalized texts and better management to increase public accessibility to Yogyakarta's heritage.

He had shown leadership during natural disasters when needed, especially during the 2006 earthquake in Bantul and the 2010 eruptions of Mount Merapi. His authority as a cultural leader during the Merapi eruptions was tested, especially with the Kraton's relations to Mbah Maridjan, the juru kunci of Merapi who was appointed by Hamengkubuwono IX. Both men showed different approach, with the Sultan favored evacuations based on scientific data and Maridjan who prefers to stay in the mountain slope because of spiritual believes. Maridjan didn't survive the eruption and Hamengkubuwono X appointed a new custodian, Mas Bekel Anom Suraksosihono (Mas Asih), on a renewed mandate. When formally appointing Mas Asih, Hamengkubuwono X states that duties of a juru kunci is not just about preserving culture, but to also coordinate with national authorities and vulcanologists in times of disaster.

During his reign, he met influential foreign officials that came to visit his realm. He received Charles, Prince of Wales (1998, 2008), Diana, Princess of Wales (1989), Emperor Akihito and Empress Michiko (1991), First Lady Hillary Clinton (1994), Prince Fumihito and Princess Kiko (2008), Margrethe II of Denmark (2015), President of Ukraine Petro Poroshenko (2016), IMF Director Christine Lagarde (2018), King Abdullah of Pahang and Queen Azizah (2019), Singaporean president Halimah Yacob (2020), Willem-Alexander of the Netherlands and Queen Máxima (2020), German president Frank-Walter Steinmeier (2022), Emperor Naruhito (2023), and Prime Minister of Timor Leste Xanana Gusmão (2025).

=== As Governor ===
Hamengkubuwono X was formally appointed as Governor of Yogyakarta for his first term in 3 October 1998, succeeding Paku Alam VIII who succeed his father as Governor after the latter's death. Since his inauguration, he has held the position of regional head continuously through the post-New Order national political transition. During his early leadership, the Governor of the Special Region of Yogyakarta's tenure was extended several times by the central government due to the lack of new regulations governing the succession mechanism for regional heads in the province.

He was reappointed in 2003 by the Yogyakarta Regional House of Representatives (DPRD DIY) through a vote with his term expires in 2008. During his second term, Paku Alam IX was confirmed as his Deputy Governor. Their appointments marked the return of the original arrangement between the Yogyakarta Sultanate and Pakualaman in provincial leadership structure.

Approaching the end of his term in 2008, there was political dynamics related to the regional head succession mechanism which resulted in the extension of the governor's term of office for several years by the central government. The subject was even touched by President Susilo Bambang Yudhoyono which led into political conflict with the Sultanate. The uncertainty was resolved with the passage of Law No. 13 of 2012 or known as the Special Region of Yogyakarta Special Autonomy Act. The Act formalizes the position of Governor to be held by the reigning Sultan of Yogyakarta while the position of Deputy Governor to be held by the reigning Duke of Pakualaman through a determination mechanism, not a general election.

=== Role in national politics ===
He participated in street protests in support of the May 1998 student demonstrations opposing Suharto's rule. On May 20, 1998, a day before Suharto resigned, Hamengkubuwono X met with hundred thousand protesters gathered in the Kraton's north square where he issued a royal decree supporting the Reformasi in a peaceful manner and to uphold national unity. This is the first time for a reigning Sultan of Yogyakarta to be involved in modern political affairs at the national level.

Aside from keeping the peace within Yogyakarta, Hamengkubuwono X also met with few national leaders after Suharto resigned. On 10 November 1998, he met Abdurrahman Wahid, Megawati Sukarnoputri, and Amien Rais in Wahid's residence at Ciganjur, South Jakarta. The four leaders then issued the "Ciganjur Declaration" in which eight political compromises were to be achieved, including the end of Dwifungsi, and early elections to be called as soon as possible.

Hamengkubuwono X has a long track record as a national politician in his own right. He was a senior politician in Golkar and he was appointed to the party's advisory council. During the 2004 and 2009 presidential elections, Hamengkubuwono X was floated to be a presidential candidate. In 2004, he participated in Golkar's national convention but he was not chosen as candidate as Wiranto became Golkar's nominee. On 28 October 2008, Hamengkubuwono X did declare his candidacy in Kraton Yogyakarta's north square, but he failed. In 2010, he formed Nasional Demokrat together with Surya Paloh, which later became the NasDem Party. Hamengkubuwono X left the organization after NasDem became a political party, stating that he will not be attached to partisan politics.

Hamengkubuwono X encountered his greatest political tension against the central government between 2010 and 2012 when a tense debate regarding to the Special Region of Yogyakarta Special Autonomy Draft Act occurred. At that time, President Susilo Bambang Yudhoyono in 2010 touched on the issue of "a monarchical system that clashes with democracy" in the context of the Yogyakarta government. This caused massive protests in Yogyakarta who supported the current appointment mechanism. Hamengkubuwono X retorted by stating he is ready to "vacate" his position according to the will of the people, a move that increased his legitimacy and political support. This move pressure the central government to accommodate the stipulation clause in Law No. 13 of 2012.

After the law's passage in 2012, Hamengkubuwono X's political career changed through judicial means. The law itself has made the position of Governor and Vice Governor of Yogyakarta into a non-partisan position. Because of this, Hamengkubuwono X resigned from Golkar in September 2012. This step marked the end of the era of formal political affiliation of the Yogyakarta Sultanate with certain parties which had been going on since the New Order era, placing the Sultan in a neutral position as a "protector" for all political groups in his region.

== Personal life ==
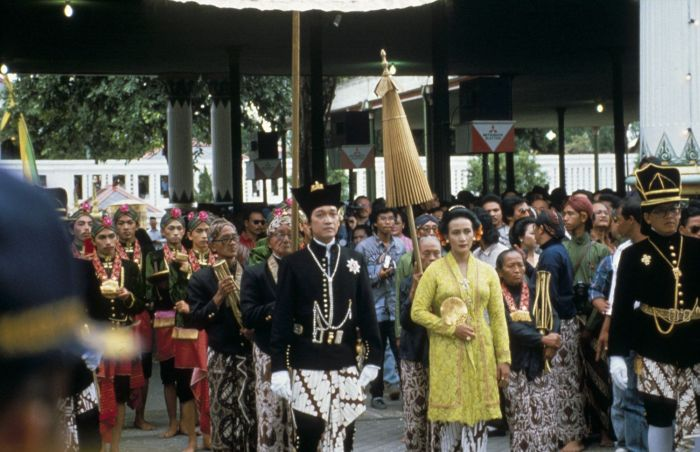
Coronation of Hamengkubuwono X and Hemas in 1989

Hamengkubuwono X has discontinued the polygamist tradition of Javanese monarchs having several wives and possibly multiple concubines, following his father's wishes to modernize the royal system. He is married to Queen Hemas since May 1973. Together, they have five daughters: Crown Princess Mangkubumi, Princess Condrokirono, Princess Maduretno, Princess Hayu, and Princess Bendara. His decision to appoint his eldest daughter as heir presumptive ended the previously agnatic primogeniture succession and has become subject to controversy.

Hamengkubuwono X resides in the Keraton Yogyakarta complex and uses the Governor's mansion solely for political affairs.

== Titles and honours ==
Styles of Hamengkubuwono X
- Reference style: His Majesty
- Spoken style: Your Majesty
- Alternative style: Ngarso Dalem

=== Titles ===
In Javanese Kraton (the equivalent of palaces), the names of individuals change with respect to a change in status:

- From birth until marriage: Bendoro Raden Mas Herjuno Darpito
- Post-nuptial until appointment as Crown Prince: Kanjeng Gusti Pangeran Harya (KGPH) Mangkubumi
- As Heir Apparent Crown Prince: Kanjeng Gusti Pangeran Adipati Anom (KGPAAn) Hamengku Negara Sudibya Raja Putra Nalendra Mataram.
- As Sultan: Ngarsa Dalem Sampeyan Dalem Ingkang Sinuwun Kangjeng Sri Sultan Hamengku Buwono Senapati ing Ngalogo Ngabdurrokhman Sayidin Panatagama Khalifatullah ingkang jumeneng kaping X

His style and title in full English: His Majesty The Sultan Hamengkubuwono the Tenth, Commander-in-Chief in war, Servant of the Most Gracious, Cleric and Caliph that Safeguards the Religion

=== National honours ===
- Indonesia:
  - Star of Mahaputera (3rd Class) (Indonesian: Bintang Mahaputera Utama) (2007)
  - Civil Servants' Long Service Medal (Indonesian: Satyalancana Karya Satya) (30 years)
  - Civil Servants' Long Service Medal (Indonesian: Satyalancana Karya Satya) (20 years)
  - Civil Servants' Long Service Medal (Indonesian: Satyalancana Karya Satya) (10 years)
  - Medal for Contributing in the National Development (Indonesian: Satyalancana Pembangunan)
  - Medal for Providing an Example of Meritorious Personality (Indonesian: Satyalancana Wira Karya)
  - Medal for Service in the Field of Social Welfare (Indonesian: Satyalancana Kebaktian Sosial)
  - Badge of Melati
  - Badge of Dharma Bhakti
  - Badge of Pancawarsa IV
  - Badge of Pancawarsa VII

=== Foreign honours ===
- Austria
  - Grand Decoration of Honour in Gold with Sash of the Decoration of Honour for Services to the Republic of Austria - 1996
- Japan:
  - Order of the Rising Sun, Gold and Silver Star - 2022
- Netherlands:
  - Knight Grand Cross of the Order of Orange-Nassau
- Honorary Degree of Doctor of Laws, University of Tasmania, Australia (2015)

== See also ==
- List of Sunni Muslim dynasties
- Kejawèn religion

== Notes ==
Sri Sultan Hamengkubuwono X House of Hamengkubuwono Cadet branch of the House of Mataram Born: 2 April 1946
Political offices
Preceded by Paku Alam VIII	Governor of Yogyakarta; 1998–present	Incumbent
Regnal titles
Preceded by Hamengkubuwono IX	Sultan of Yogyakarta; 1989–present	Incumbent; Heir presumptive: Mangkubumi
