= Prabakusuma =

Prabakusuma is a character in the Javanese wayang, also called by the name Bambang Priyambada. He is the son of Arjuna from his marriage with Princess Dewi Supraba who became his wife when he was the king of kahyangan. Prabakusuma is as handsome and strong as his father. His accuracy in shooting an arrow is quite unbeatable. He was raised by his grandfather, Sage Sidikwaspada from Glagahwangi Monastery. Prabakusuma helped Amarta Kingdom when Princess Mustakaweni stole Jamus Kalimasada by disguising to be Ghatotkacha
