= Hamengkubuwono VIII =

Sultan of Yogyakarta from 1921 to 1939

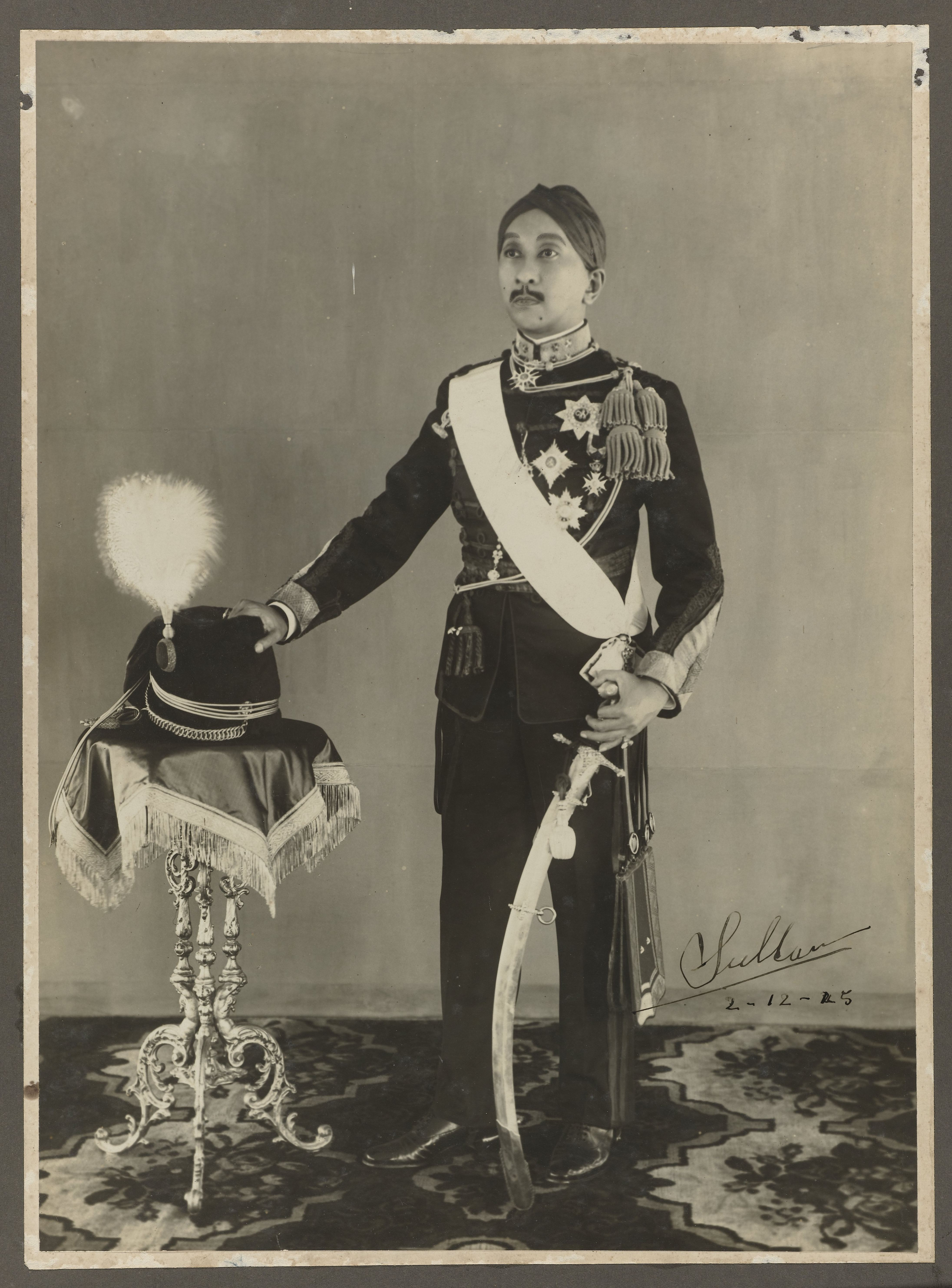

8th Sultan of Yogyakarta
- Reign: 8 February 1921 – 22 October 1939
- Coronation: 8 February 1921
- Predecessor: Hamengkubuwono VII
- Successor: Hamengkubuwono IX
- Born: Gusti Raden Mas Sujadi; 3 March 1880; Yogyakarta, Dutch East Indies
- Died: 22 October 1939 (aged 59); Yogyakarta, Dutch East Indies
- Burial: Saptarengga Mausoleum, Pajimatan Imogiri Tombs
- Spouse: Kanjeng Raden Ayu Adipati Anom Hamengkunegara
- Issue: Hamengkubuwono IX
- House: Mataram
- Father: Hamengkubuwono VII
- Mother: Gusti Kanjeng Ratu Hemas

Hamengkubuwono VIII (3 March 1880 – 22 October 1939), also spelled as Hamengkubuwana VIII, was the 8th sultan of Yogyakarta, reigning from 1921 until he died in 1939. During his reign, he carried out the rehabilitation of the Kraton Ngayogyakarta Hadiningrat building, as well as several other structures. He was also one of the first to support Kyai Haji Ahmad Dahlan in the formation of the Muhammadiyah organization.

== Early life and education ==
=== Early life ===
Hamengkubuwono VIII, born as Gusti Raden Mas Sujadi, was born on 3 March 1880. His father was the Sultan of Yogyakarta, Hamengkubuwono VII, while his mother was the second queen consort, Gusti Kanjeng Ratu Hemas, daughter of Kanjeng Raden Tumenggung Jayadipura. In 1895, he was appointed as Kanjeng Gusti Pangeran Adipati Anom.

== Reign ==
=== Infrastructure ===
During the leadership of Hamengkubuwono VIII, Yogyakarta experienced rapid progress in the fields of education and health. In the field of architecture, the sultan overhauled the current physical form of the palace.

=== Culture ===
In the field of culture, several dances were created during his leadership, including the Srimpi dance. It was also at this time that the standardization of classical Yogyakarta-style dance standards began.

=== Appointment of heir ===
In 1939, he recalled his son, Raden Mas Dorodjatun (later known as Hamengkubuwono IX), who was studying in the Netherlands. In Batavia, the Sultan handed over the kris of Kyai Ageng Joko Piturun to Gusti Raden Mas Dorojatun as a sign of royal succession, as well as a sign that it was Gusti Raden Mas Dorojatun who would later succeed as Sultan.

== Death ==
He died on 22 October 1939, at Panti Rapih Hospital, Yogyakarta. He is buried in Astana Saptarengga, Pajimatan Imogiri.

== Titles ==
- During the reign of Hamengkubuwana VII (1877 – 1921)
  - Gusti Raden Mas Sujadi (since 1880)
  - Gusti Pangeran Harya Purbaya
  - Kanjeng Gusti Pangeran Adipati Anom Hamengkunegara Sudibya Rajaputra Narendra Mataram ing Ngayogyakarta Hadiningrat
- During his reign as Hamengkubuwana VIII
  - Ngarsa Dalem Sampeyan Dalem Ingkang Sinuhun Sri Sultan Hamengkubuwana Senopati ing Ngalaga 'Abdurrahman Sayyidin Panatagama Kalifatullah ingkang Jumeneng Kaping Wolu ing Ngayogyakarta Hadiningrat

Regnal titles
Preceded by Hamengkubuwono VII	Sultan of Yogyakarta; 1921–1939	Succeeded by Hamengkubuwono IX
