= Panti Rapih Hospital =

- Panti Rapih Foundation
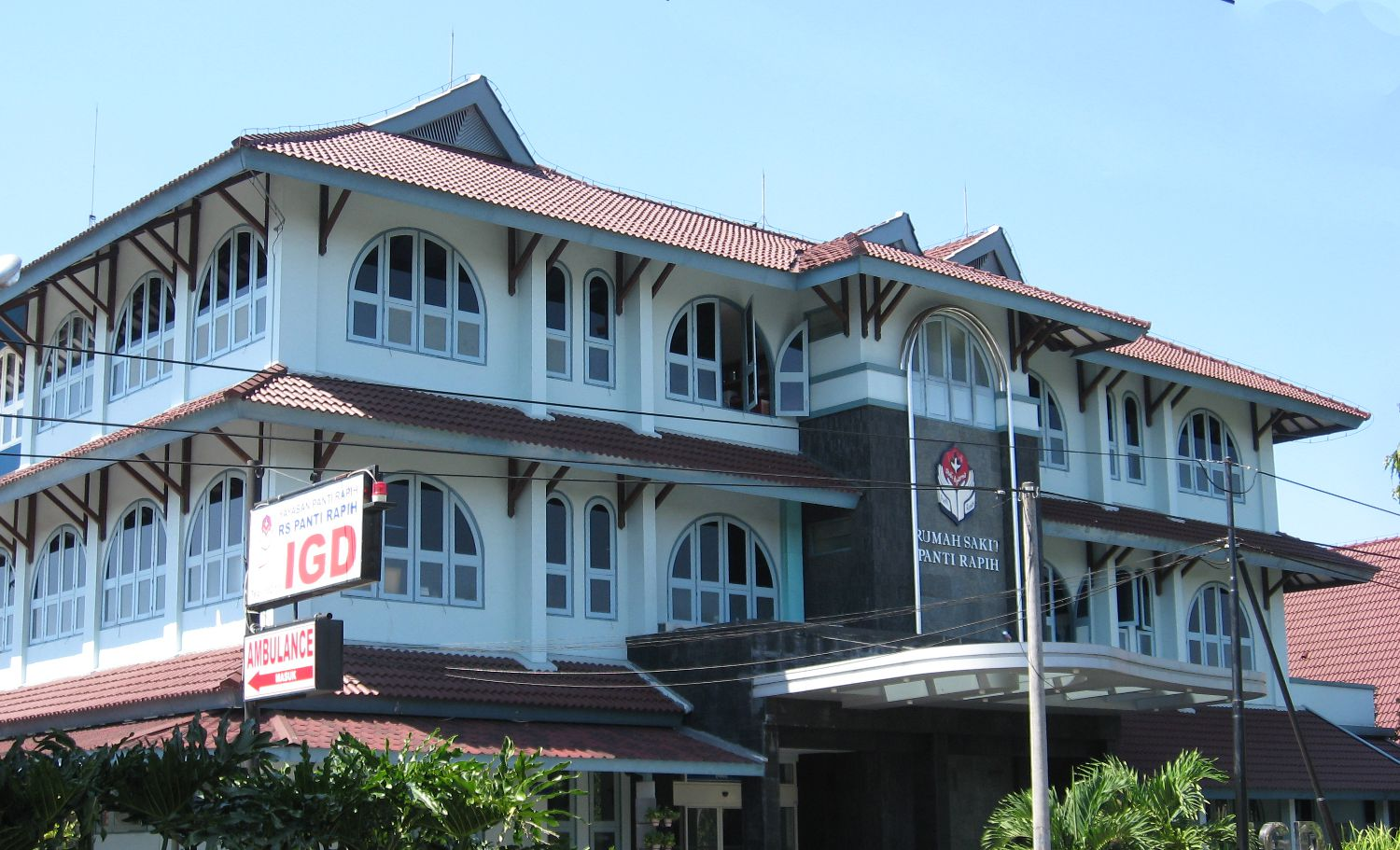
- Panti Rapih Hospital in 2012

- Location in Yogyakarta

Geography
- Location: Jl. Cik di Tiro No. 30; Yogyakarta, Special Region of Yogyakarta, Indonesia
- Coordinates: 7.776850°S 110.376350°E

Organisation
- Care system: Private
- Type: District General
- Religious affiliation: Catholic Church, Sisters of Mercy of St. Borromeo
- Patron: Sisters of Mercy of St. Borromeo

Services
- Emergency department: Yes

History
- Founded: 1929

Links
- Website: http://www.pantirapih.or.id/
- Lists: Hospitals in Indonesia

Panti Rapih Hospital (Rumah Sakit Panti Rapih) is a private dis hospital in Yogyakarta, Indonesia. It was founded in 1929 by five sisters from St. Carolus Borromeus. It is managed by the Panti Rapih Foundation.

== History ==
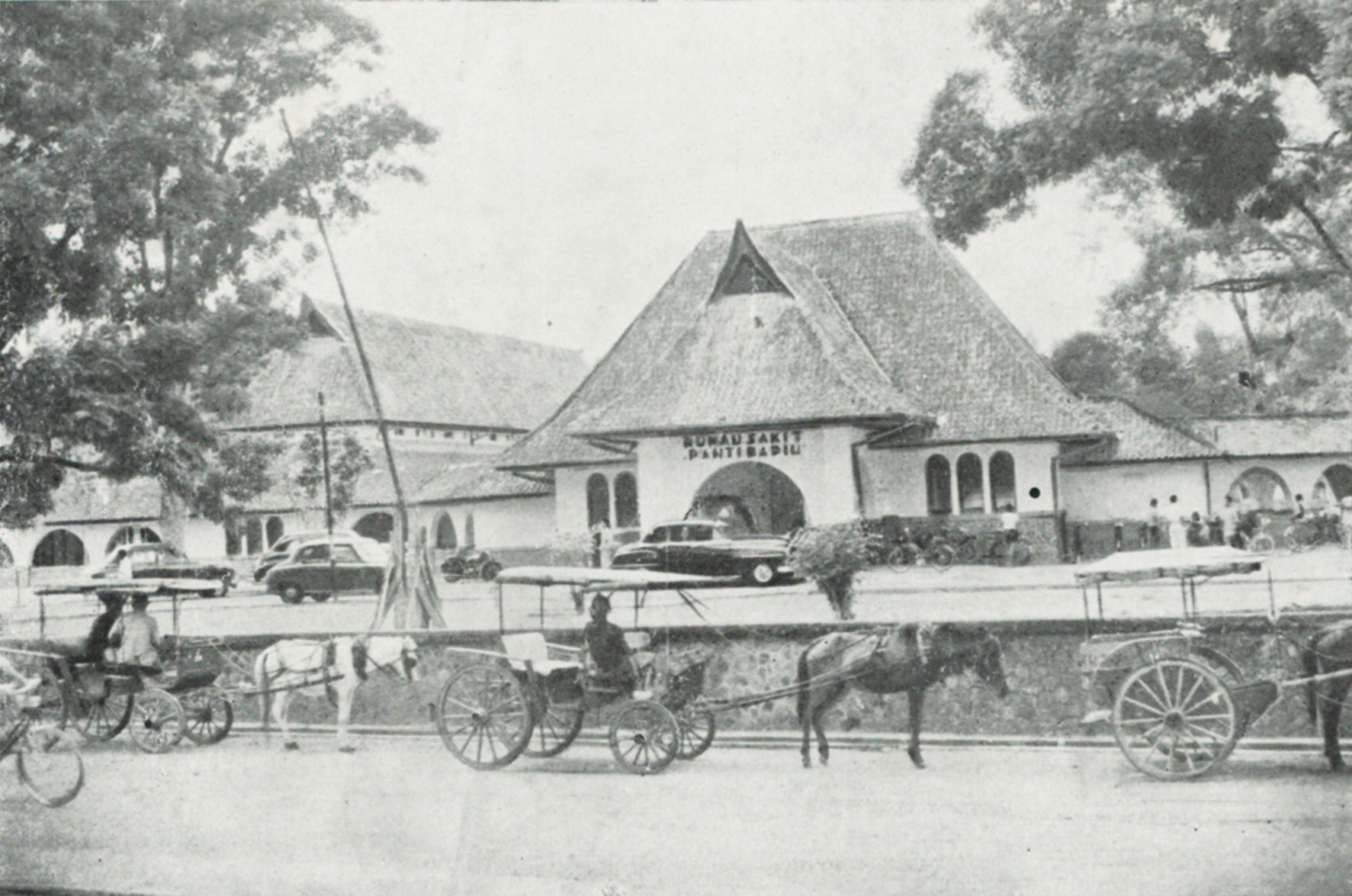
Panti Rapih Hospital, circa 1956

In January 1929, five sisters from St. Carolus Borromeus came to Yogyakarta to serve the sick people. They are Sr. Gaudentia Brand, Sr. Yudith de Laat, Sr. Ignatia Lemmens, Sr. Simonia, and Sr. Ludolpha de Groot. With the help from Ir. Schmutzer, a hospital was built.

The foundation stone was laid by C.T.M.Schmutzer van Rijckevorsel on September 15, 1928, and the building work was finished in August 1929. On August 25, 1929, the building was blessed by Mgr. Van Velsen, S.J., and on September 14, 1929, the hospital was opened by Sultan Hamengkubuwono VIII as Onder de Bogen Hospital. The building was designed by AIA, one of the largest architectural consultants in the Dutch Indies.

A few years later, Sultan Hamengkubuwono VIII presented the hospital with an ambulance. The building was similar to St. Carolus Borromeus Main Monastery in Maastricht, the Netherlands. The sisters ministered to the sick people based on the Gospel teaching.

More and more patients came to the hospital. Some of the patients were Dutch and sultanate bureaucrats. To help the poor, a clinic for the poor was built with the help of Bruder FIC Congregation.

In 1942, the Japanese came and the hospital management became worse and worse. The Dutch sisters were sent to the camps and the hospital was taken over by the Japanese. During this time, Sr. Sponsaria was chosen as the president, and Moeder Yvonne was chosen as the CB Sisters' leader in Indonesia. Because the Dutch name was forbidden, the hospital name was changed to Panti Rapih which meant 'healing hospital'. The new name was given by the Semarang Archbishop, Mgr. Sugiyopranoto, S.J.

After the Japanese era, the CB Sisters came back to the hospital and took care of the Indonesian soldiers, including Indonesian Armed Forces Commander-in-Chief, General Sudirman.

== President ==
The current president is Dr. St. Arif Haliman, M.Ph.

== Location ==
The hospital is located on Cik Ditiro Street, in front of the main entrance to Universitas Gadjah Mada.
