= ISS International School =

ISS International School (Singapore)
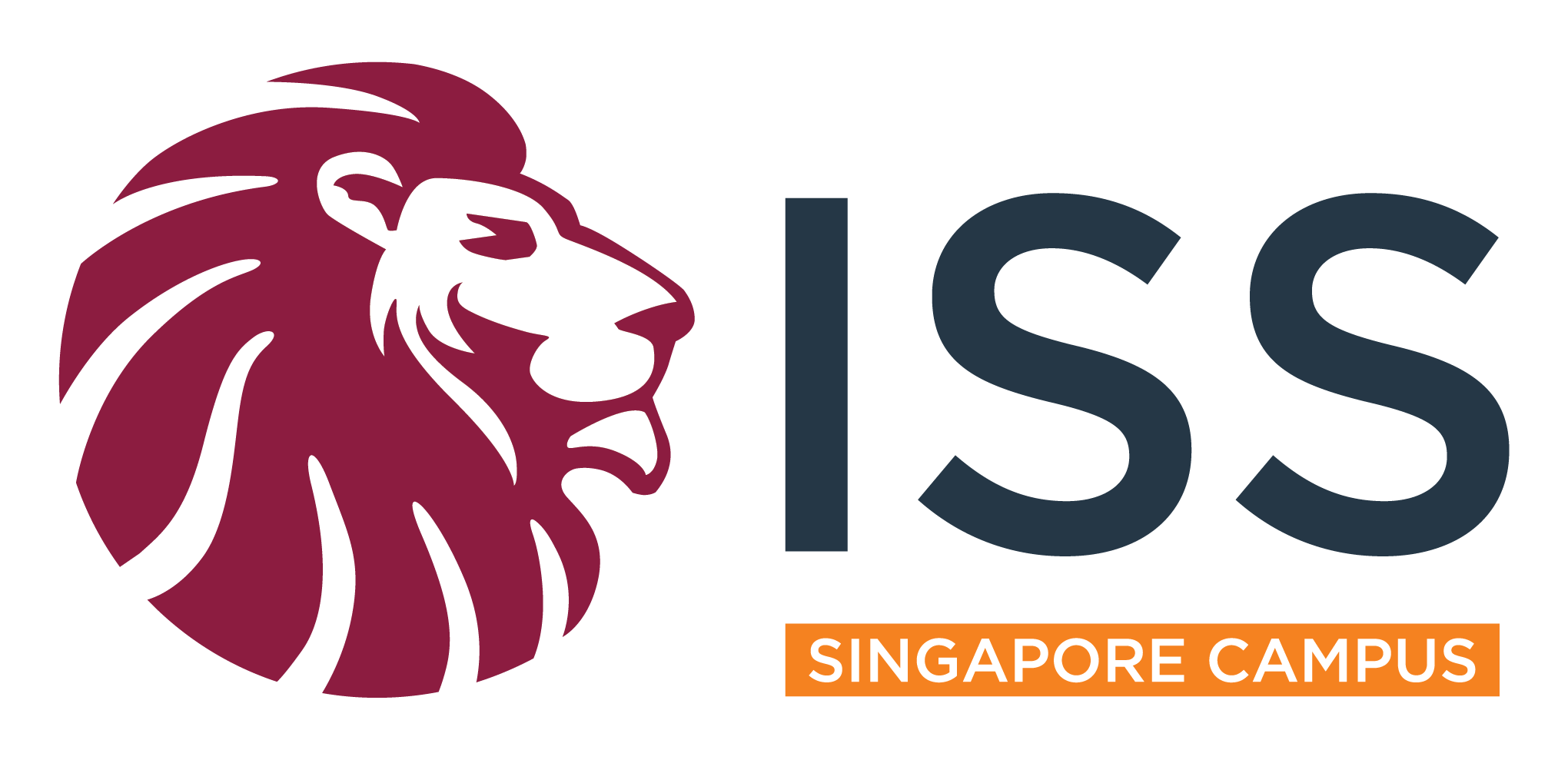

Location
- 21 Preston Road; Singapore 109355; Singapore; 1°16′50.2″N 103°48′19.65″E

Information
- School type: Private International School IB World School
- Established: 1981
- Headmaster: Dr. Dharshini Jeremiah
- Grades: Kindergarten - High School
- Website: https://www.iss.edu.sg/

ISS International School is a co-educational international school in Singapore. It is an International Baccalaureate (IB) World School founded in 1981 and offers IB curriculum from Kindergarten to Grade 12.

== History ==
The campus was a military outpost used by the British Army until the withdrawal of British forces in 1971. The school is on the site of the former Alexandra Grammar School which was attended mainly by the children of serving British military personnel serving in Singapore.

ISS formerly had a second campus in Orchard catering to students from Kindergarten to Grade 8, which unified at their campus in Alexandra in 2020.
