= Princess Maduretno =

Princess of Yogyakarta (born 1978)

Maduretno
- Gusti Kanjeng Ratu Maduretno
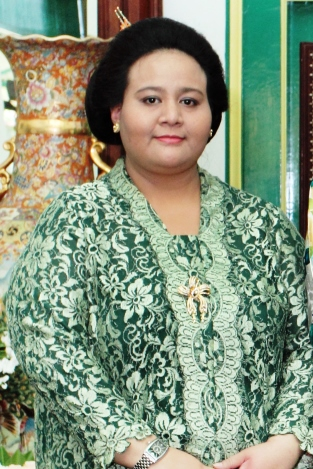
- Maduretno in June 2013.
- Born: Gusti Raden Ajeng Nurkamnari Dewi; 12 April 1978 (age 48); Yogyakarta, Indonesia
- Spouse: Yun Prasetyo (m. 2008)
- Javanese: ꦩꦢꦸꦉꦠ꧀ꦤ
- House: Hamengkubuwono
- Father: Hamengkubuwono X
- Mother: Ratu Hemas
- Religion: Islam

Princess Maduretno of Yogyakarta (ꦩꦢꦸꦉꦠ꧀ꦤ; born 12 April 1978) is daughter of Sultan Hamengkubuwono X of Yogyakarta and his consort, Ratu Hemas.

== Early life and education ==
Maduretno was born Gusti Raden Ajeng Nurkamnari Dewi on 12 April 1978 in Yogyakarta, Indonesia, to Sultan Hamengkubuwono X and Ratu Hemas.

Nurkamnari Dewi spent her early childhood in the Madukismo Sugar and Spirit Distillery housing complex in Kasihan, Bantul. Because of her parents' royal and political duties, the family moved from Kaliurang in Pakem, Sleman to that housing area in the late 1970s to early 1980s together with other members of the royal household. After roughly a decade in Madukismo, the family moved to the Keraton Yogyakarta in February 1988.

Her father, KGPH Mangkubumi, was the eldest son of Hamengkubuwana IX and was regarded as the principal heir to the succession of the Sultanate of Yogyakarta. In 1989, following his grandfather's death, her father was installed as Hamengkubuwana X and her mother became the consort. After their parents' installation, she and her sisters took up full-time residence at the Keraton Ngayogyakarta Hadiningrat.

Nurkamnari Dewi was raised in the Special Region of Yogyakarta through lower secondary school. She attended SMP Stella Duce Yogyakarta. After graduating, her parents supported her to continue her education in Australia. She completed secondary education at Indooroopilly State High School (ISHS) in Brisbane, Queensland, then remained in Brisbane to study hospitality at TAFE Queensland, before undertaking food and beverage studies at Holmesglen Institute of TAFE (Glen Waverley campus) in Melbourne, Victoria.

== Personal life ==
On 9 May 2008, Nurkamnari Dewi married Yun Prasetyo. The wedding was held at the Keraton Yogyakarta and was the third grand wedding of a daughter of Hamengkubuwana X after his elder daughter Pembayun married on 28 May 2002. In accordance with palace custom, prior to the marriage the groom was appointed an abdi dalem of the kraton with the Javanese noble title Kanjeng Raden Tumenggung (KRT) Purbodiningrat, while the bride's court title became Gusti Raden Ayu (GRAy) Purbodiningrat.

The wedding at the kraton was attended by senior state officials, including President Susilo Bambang Yudhoyono and Vice-President Jusuf Kalla. The sequence of events followed customary palace tradition with one exception: there was no kirab procession.

To date, the couple Purbodiningrat and Maduretno have not had children.

== Roles and public activities ==
Maduretno carries formal palace responsibilities and is listed among the kraton officials and palace figures with roles related to cultural preservation and ceremonial duties (for example, assigned Penghageng and Tepas posts). She participates in cultural programmes and palace events and is active in local social and cultural initiatives associated with the Yogyakarta Sultanate.

== See also ==
- Hamengkubuwono X
- Kraton Ngayogyakarta Hadiningrat
