= Bregada =

Procession and art of soldiering in Indonesia

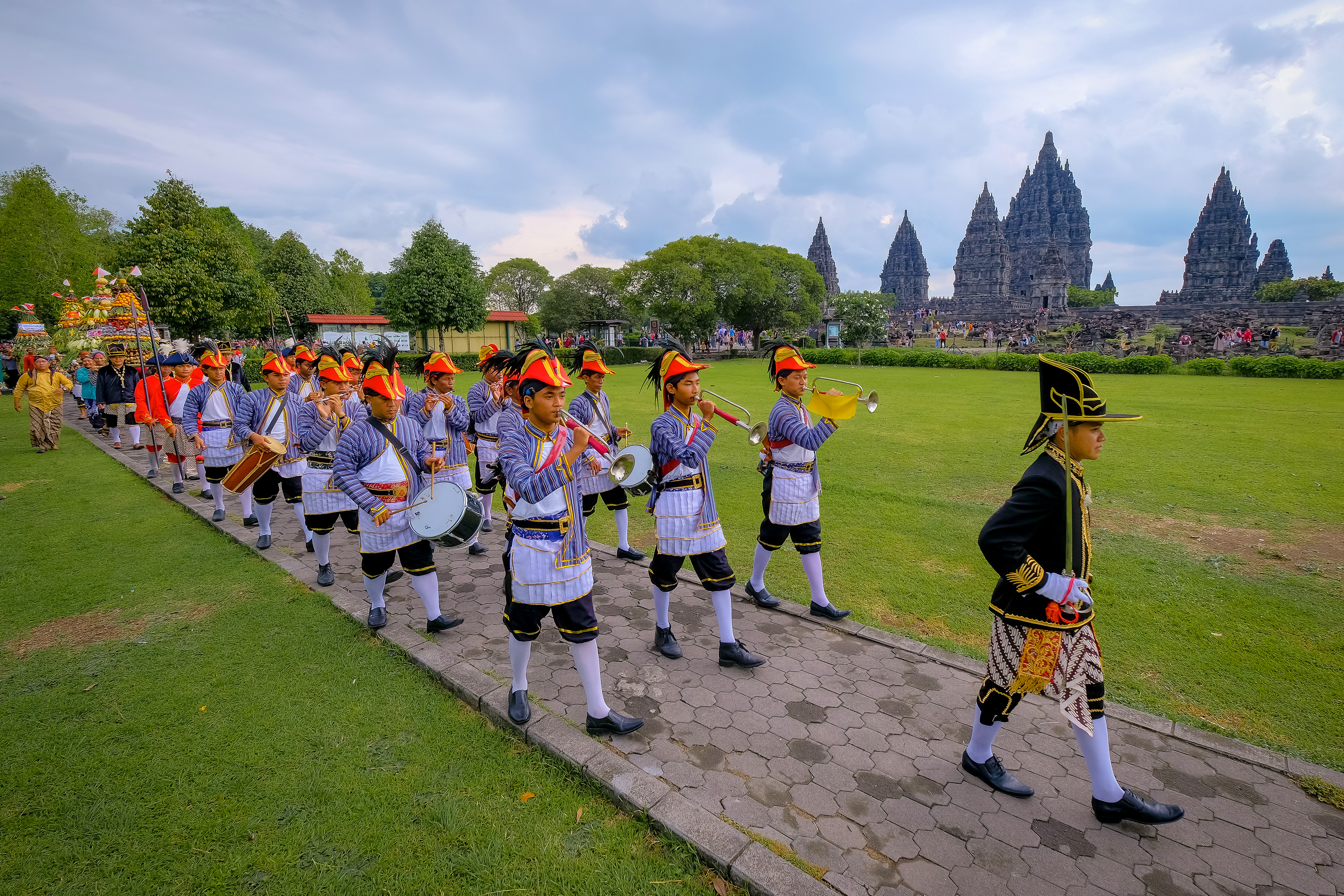
Bregada Rakyat parades in front of Prambanan temple

Bregada (Javanese: ꦧꦽꦒꦢ, romanized: bregada from Dutch: brigade "brigade") more fully as bregada kaprajuritan is an art of soldiering that originated in the Mataram Sultanate. It adapts military elements to Javanese culture. Unlike other forms of soldiering, bregada usually appears as an army that is generally deployed during traditional ceremonies or folk festivals, such as Grebeg or merti dusun. There are currently 4 categories of bregada active in Yogyakarta: bregada Keraton Yogyakarta, bregada Keraton Surakarta, bregada Pura Pakualaman, as well as bregada formed independently by the community, called bregada rakyat (or People's bregada).

== History ==
The development of the bregada (a traditional Javanese military formation) is closely tied to the history of the Mataram Sultanate. From its inception, the Mataram Sultanate established a formidable and resilient military force, as evidenced during the Siege of Batavia in 1628 and 1629, when Mataram troops laid siege to the Dutch East India Company (VOC) stronghold in Batavia. The military prowess of the Sultanate was a key factor in its power and influence in the region. However, the Mataram Sultanate eventually split during the reign of Pakubuwana III, a consequence of the Third Javanese War of Succession. This conflict culminated in the signing of the Treaty of Giyanti on February 13, 1755, between Pakubuwana III and Prince Mangkubumi I. The treaty officially divided the Mataram Sultanate into two separate entities: the Surakarta Sunanate and the Ngayogyakarta Sultanate.

=== bregada Yogyakarta ===
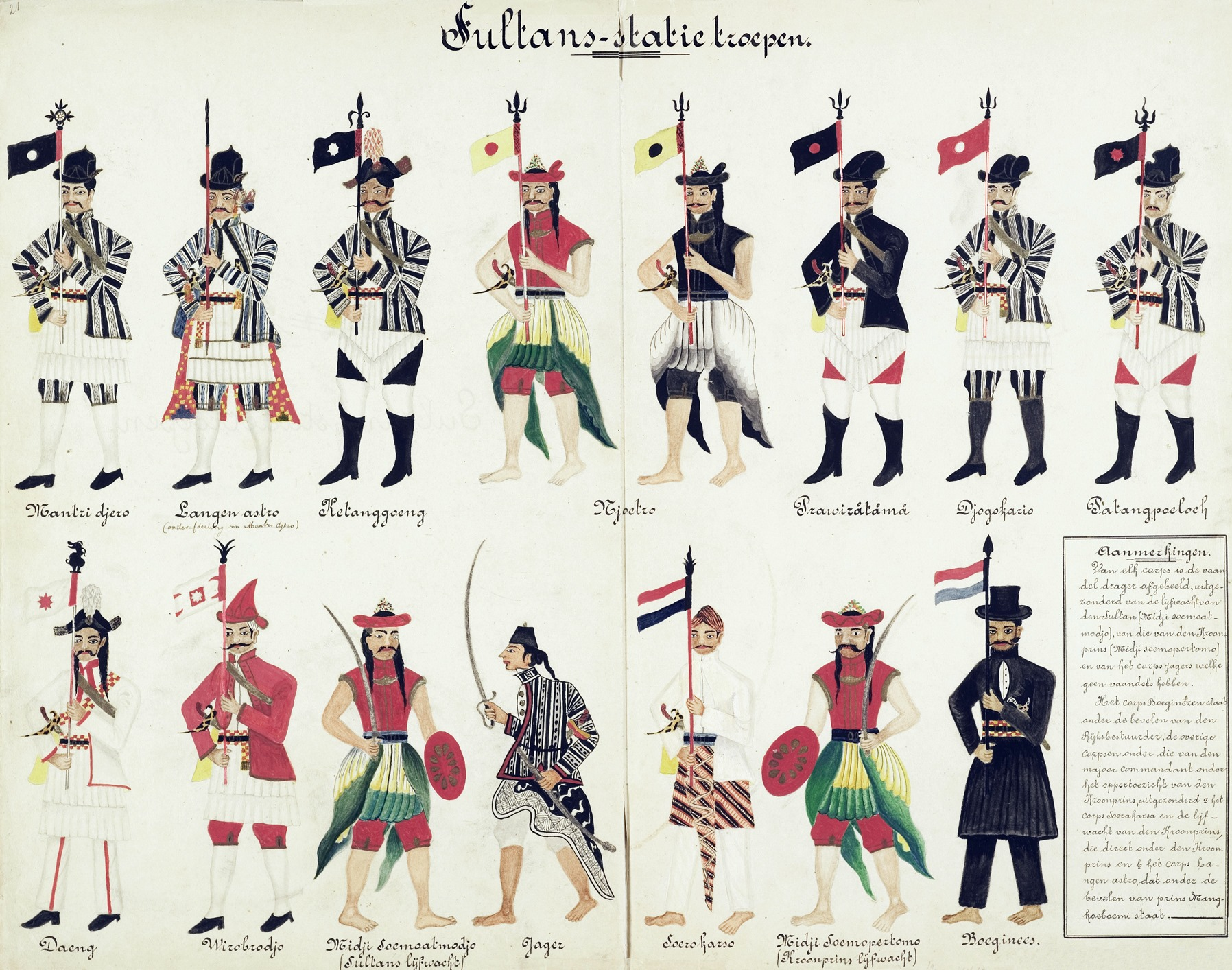
Earliest sketches of the dwajadara (flag-bearing soldiers) of the Yogyakarta Palace's bregada soldiers in the 19th century.

At the time of the Battle of Jenar against the VOC, Pangeran Mangkubumi had a bregada of soldiers who were very agile; it was called bregada Mantrilebet (now called Mantrijero). This bregada succeeded in defeating Major Clereq on December 12, 1751. Major Clereq faced one-on-one with a soldier named Wiradigda. A then spear wounded Clereq's shoulder, causing him to lose his sword and fall. In a precarious situation, he tried to point a gun at Wiradigda. However, Wiradigda was not alone; Wiradigda was assisted by his colleague Prawirarana to thrust a spear into Clereq's neck until Clereq died instantly. The spear used in the incident was then named Kyai Clereq.

After the Ngayogyakarta Sultanate was established, Hamengkubuwana I ordered the construction of the palace, as well as institutionalizing a unit of soldiers who continued to fight armed. Their strength was increasingly respected; in 1781, a Governor of the Northeast Coast of Java named Johannes Siberg (served 1780–1787) had requested the deployment of 1,132 palace troops, with details of 1,000 ordinary soldiers, 100 Crown Prince guards, and the rest of high-ranking officers, to Batavia. The purpose of this deployment was to repel the British army that would fight against the Dutch and occupy Southeast Asia. Their assignment ended in October 1783 and they were rewarded with 12 cannons from the VOC Resident in Yogyakarta. To support the daily activities of the army, Fort Baluwerti was built with a ditch on the outside; it was built on the initiative of Bendara Raden Mas Sundara, who was appointed Crown Prince of the Sultanate (later Hamengkubuwana II) in 1782.

In 1785, Siberg sent a working party of Dutch maritime cadets from Semarang to study the fort. When Jan Greeve succeeded Siberg as Governor, he saw the fort during his visit to Yogyakarta on August 5–15, 1788. In Jan Greeve's report, they found the cavalry to be well-trained and welcomed him royally with a salvo of muskets and cannons. He, accompanied by Surakarta Resident Hartsinch, also visited Pesanggrahan Rejowinangun and saw the female warriors under the Kadipaten (Crown Prince), as well as a demonstration of soldiering in hunting deer at Krapyak. The female soldiers are known as Langenkusuma; they conduct regular military training in Alun-alun Kidul (the southern part of the Palace).

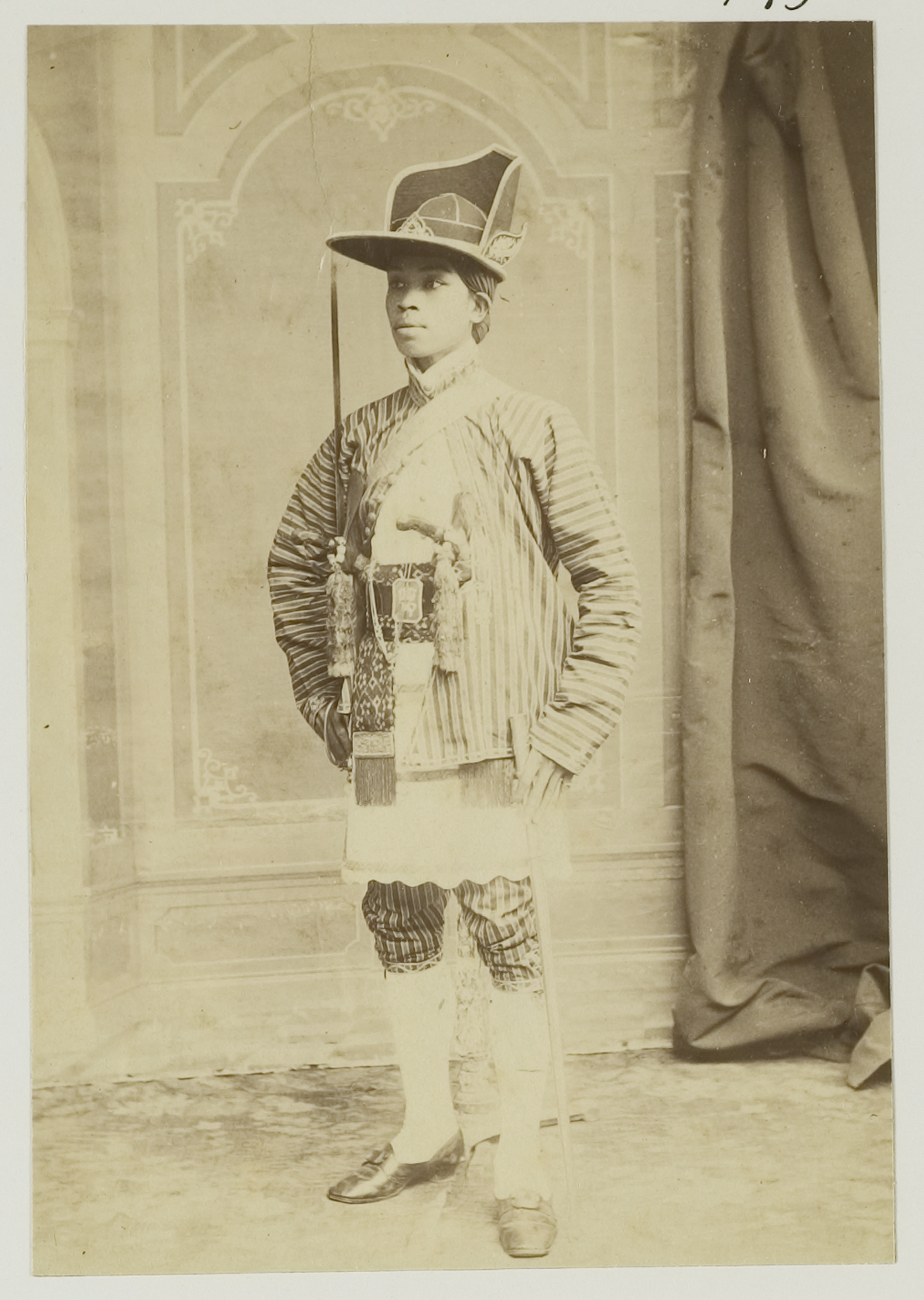
A panji (troop commander) of Bregada Mantrijero

During the reign of Hamengkubuwana I, the sultanate had three categories of soldiers. The first category was the core soldiers of the palace: Anirmala, Blambangan, Bugis, Dhaeng, Jagakarya, Kawandasa (also known as Patang-Puluh), Mandhung, Mantri Lebet (also known as Mantrijero), Mantri Pinilih, Miji Peranakan, Ketanggel (or Ketanggung), Nyutra, Sumaatmaja, Suragama, and Wirabraja. The second category is in charge of escorting the Crown Prince (bregada Kadipaten), namely Mancapertama, Prawiratama, Jayengastra, Langenastra, Pancasura, and Surakarsa. The third category is bregada Pangrembé, which is in charge of managing and protecting the lands and wealth belonging to the Sultanate, namely Suranata, Sesela, Jurusabil, Ngasrama, and Arahan. In addition, there were soldiers from the former Mataram Sultanate before the palihan nagari incident, namely Trunajaya, Mandrapertama, and Jahenghastra.

The strength of the bregada was diminishing during the reign of Hamengkubuwana II. On June 20, 1812, British troops attacked the baluarti of the Yogyakarta Palace to impose an ultimatum that forced Sultan Hamengkubuwana II to step down and replace him with the crown prince, determined by the British. The event became known as Geger Sepehi. The Sultanate's lands were occupied by Britain; Hamengkubuwana II and his son Mangkudiningrat were exiled to Penang Island, Malaya. The British unilaterally appointed another son of Hamengkubuwana II, Bendara Raden Mas Surojo, as Sultan Hamengkubuwana III. On August 1, 1813, Sultan Hamengkubuwana III was forced to sign a treaty that stipulated:

1. Britain as the holder of the authority to collect duties and customs in ports and markets;
2. Britain as the recipient of profits from the sale of Swift birds, madat and logs;
3. the Sultanate's overseas territories had to be ceded to Britain, such as Pacitan and Kedu;
4. The Sultanate was not allowed to form its own army, except for the Sultan's bodyguards.

In the reign of Hamengkubuwana IV, the soldiers who had originally served inside the fortress were then placed outside the Palace fortress. As a result, there was a weakening of the strength of the bregadas. The arrangement of the palace's bregada settlements still surrounded the fort in a horseshoe-like formation. However, soldiers such as Langenastra and Langenarja remained inside the fort. Even though their role was dwarfed, after the end of the Java War (1825–1830), the Dutch continued to exert pressure and annexations, weakening the function of the bregada. Pangrembe's soldiers were abolished, trimmed down to 14 bregada soldiers and stripped of 75% of their strength due to the demilitarization agreement between Hamengkubuwana V and the Dutch. The fourteen bregadas that remained active were Mantrijero, Ketanggung, Nyutra, Miji Peranakan, Prawiratama, Jagakarya, Patangpuluh, Dhaeng, Wirabraja, Suranata, Bugis, Surakarsa, Jager, and Arahan.

From the reign of Hamengkubuwana VI to Hamengkubuwana VIII, the bregada Prajurit Keraton turned into merely ceremonial soldiers. It was fully disbanded in 1942 and only revived on March 2, 1971 by order of Hamengkubuwana IX. The bregada soldiers come out during Grebeg ceremonies, which are held every Maulid ("Grebeg Mulud"), Eid al-Fitr (called "Grebeg Syawal"), and Eid al-Adha ("Grebeg Besar"), or cultural parades organized by the local government or the palace.

=== bregada Pakualaman ===
Before becoming a bregada, the armed forces corps of the Duchy of Pakualaman was known as "Legiun Pakualaman". The legion was formed soon after Pakualaman was established, and Paku Alam I (Prince Natakusuma) was enthroned. Unlike the Kraton bregada, the legion was facilitated with the same style of dress, skills and tactics, rank, and training as European soldiers. They were also facilitated by the colonial government from instructors to allowances. They were involved in the Aceh War, but did not satisfy the needs of the Colonial Government, so the legion was disbanded in 1892 (under Paku Alam V's era). Those who were young and healthy were offered to join the Royal Netherlands East Indies Army, but those who were refused entry were offered to become courtiers.

Forty-eight years later, in March 1940, the legion was re-established by Pura Pakualaman. But eventually, all warfare and resistance in Java ceased after Japan occupied the Dutch East Indies in 1942, and the whole of Java was under military occupation. Former members of the Pakualaman, Mangkunegaran, Cakraningrat and KNIL Legions were recruited as part of the Heiho forces.

Today, the rest of the Pakualaman bregada function as ceremonial soldiers. There are two active bregadas, Lombok Abang and Plangkir. Bregada Lombok Abang marches in front of the Gunungan, while Plangkir is behind it.

== Characteristic ==
=== Marching file ===
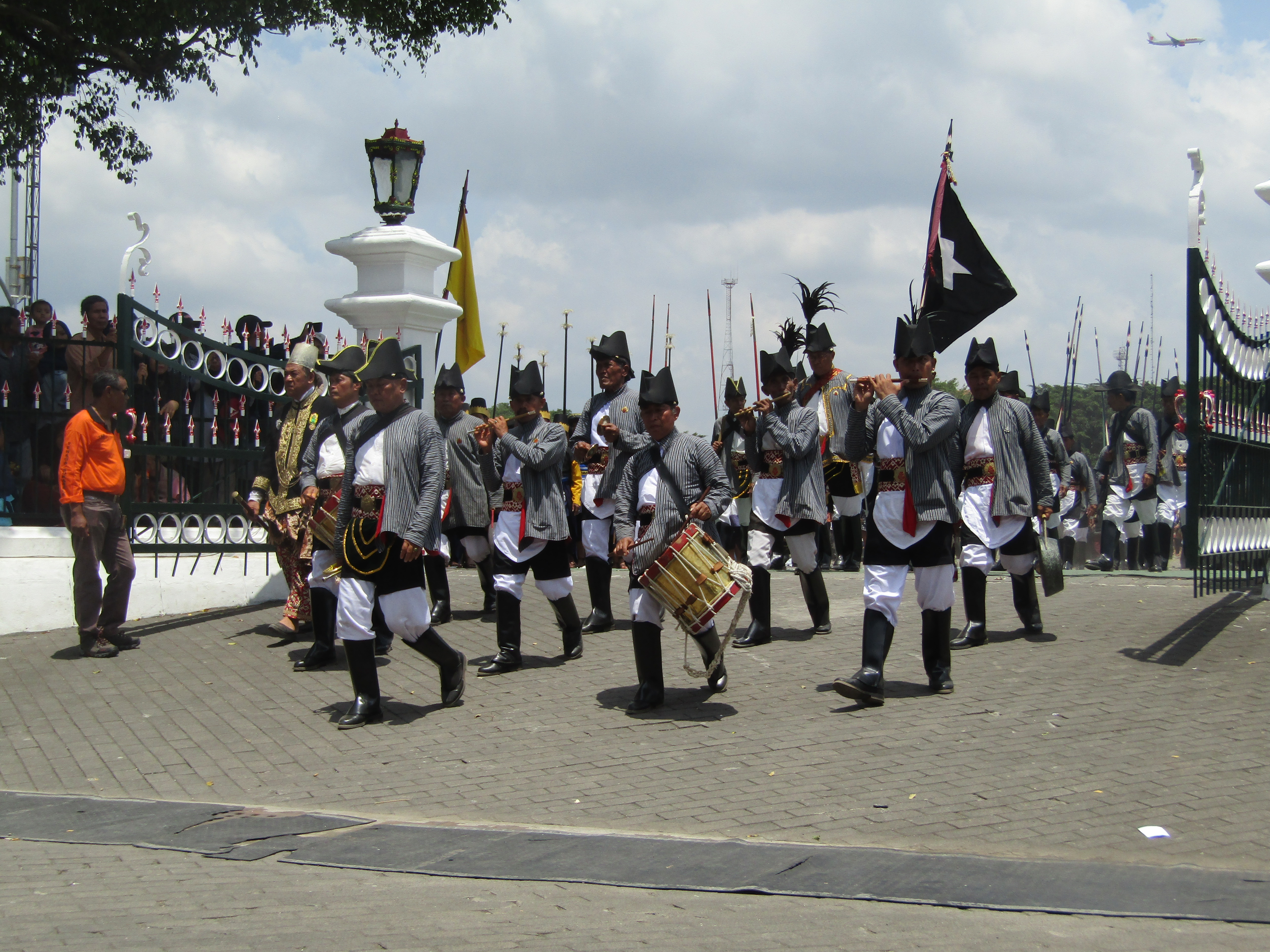
Yogyakarta military clothing adopts European, Javanese, and Islamic elements.

Unlike the Indonesian Army's marching regulations (PBB), bregada marching uses mixed Javanese and Dutch commands. Soldiers from South Sulawesi often command in a mix of several Sulawesi languages (generally Makassarese and Bugis); for example, "jarengi mana malembuk besaro, nancongi besaro, madhinching malembuk besaro." Since the 1970s, bregada commands have been in full Javanese.

There are two ways of walking, namely lampah macak and lampah rikat (march). Lampah macak is equivalent to a slow steady step, while lampah mars is equivalent to a regular fast step. Each bregada has a fixed line formation. In lampah macak, it starts from the trumpet player (if any), panji (company commander), flag bearer, rifle-carrying soldier, musical instrument player soldier, panji II (deputy company commander), rifle-carrying soldier, first spear sergeant, spear line, and finally second spear sergeant. The lampah rikatan starts with the trumpet player (if any), the soldier playing musical instruments, the ensign (company commander), the flag bearer, the soldier carrying the rifle, the panji II (deputy company commander), the soldier carrying the rifle, the first spear sergeant, the line of spears, and finally the second spear sergeant.

=== Clothing and identity ===
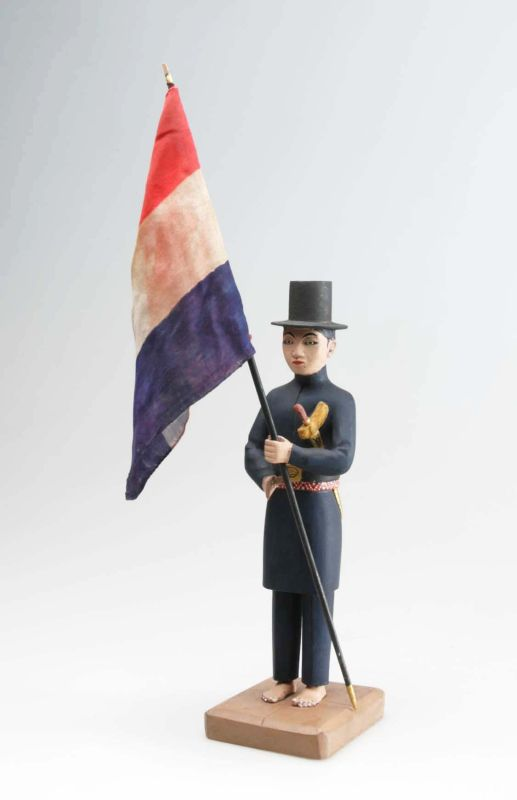
small statue of the Bugis bregada, with the old flag, Katiga-warna.

The clothing worn by the bregada keprajitan is an acculturation between Javanese, Islamic and European cultures. The VOC Governor for the East Coast of Java, Nicolaas Hartingh, reported that the court dress had adopted Islamic styles, such as white clothes and clerical turban, and carrying two krises. However, the paintings that appeared in the following period do not really indicate that Islamic elements were present in each soldier's uniform. European designs were only introduced during the time of Hamengkubuwana IV. Noticeable elements were the use of socks, shoes and hats.

Each bregada adapted its own uniform as an identity, also with different colors and motifs, as well as other identities such as the soldier's banner, spear, and instrumentation.

=== Musical instrumentation ===
The instrumentation used in bregada keprajuritan is the result of acculturation and mixing of Javanese, European, and South Sulawesi cultures. Soldiering music is generally instrumental, so in Javanese music it is classified as gendhing. Despite adapting European soldier music, these warriors in the past did not adapt European music theory, but passed it down through oral tradition. Therefore, there is no verifiable historical written notation for the individual warrior gendhings.

Elements of European music are found in the bugle, [[Tambur|tambur]] (rope-tensioned snare drum), and fife. The trumpet is used to give a certain signal/command. The drum is used to function as a tempo setter for the beat of the steps as well as the drumben. The flute functions as a melodic filler forming the gendhing. The elements of Javanese music are found in the use of [[:id:Canang|bende]] (small gong/canang) and kecer (cymbal). Bende was used in Javanese warriors before the Yogyakarta Sultanate era, serving as a signal. Kecer functions as a tempo keeper. South Sulawesi elements are found in [[:id:Ketipung|ketipung]]-dogdog and pui'-pui'. Ketipung-dogdog is believed to be an adaptation of [[Ganrang|ganrang]], a type of Makassar/Bugis drum that is beaten using a stick on one side. Pui'-pui', also referred to as dermenan, is a quadrupled reeded woodwind instrument originating South Sulawesi, but the bregada pui'-pui' is larger and differently shaped. The mouthpiece is also no longer made of palm leaves, but thin bamboo.

=== Armament ===
bregada weaponry can be in the form of firearms and sharp weapons. Commonly used firearms are cannons, rifles and pistols. Sharp weapons used can be swords, spears, arrows and krises. Some units can equip them with body armor such as shields, for example the Nyutra Soldiers.

== Current developments ==
=== Yogyakarta ===
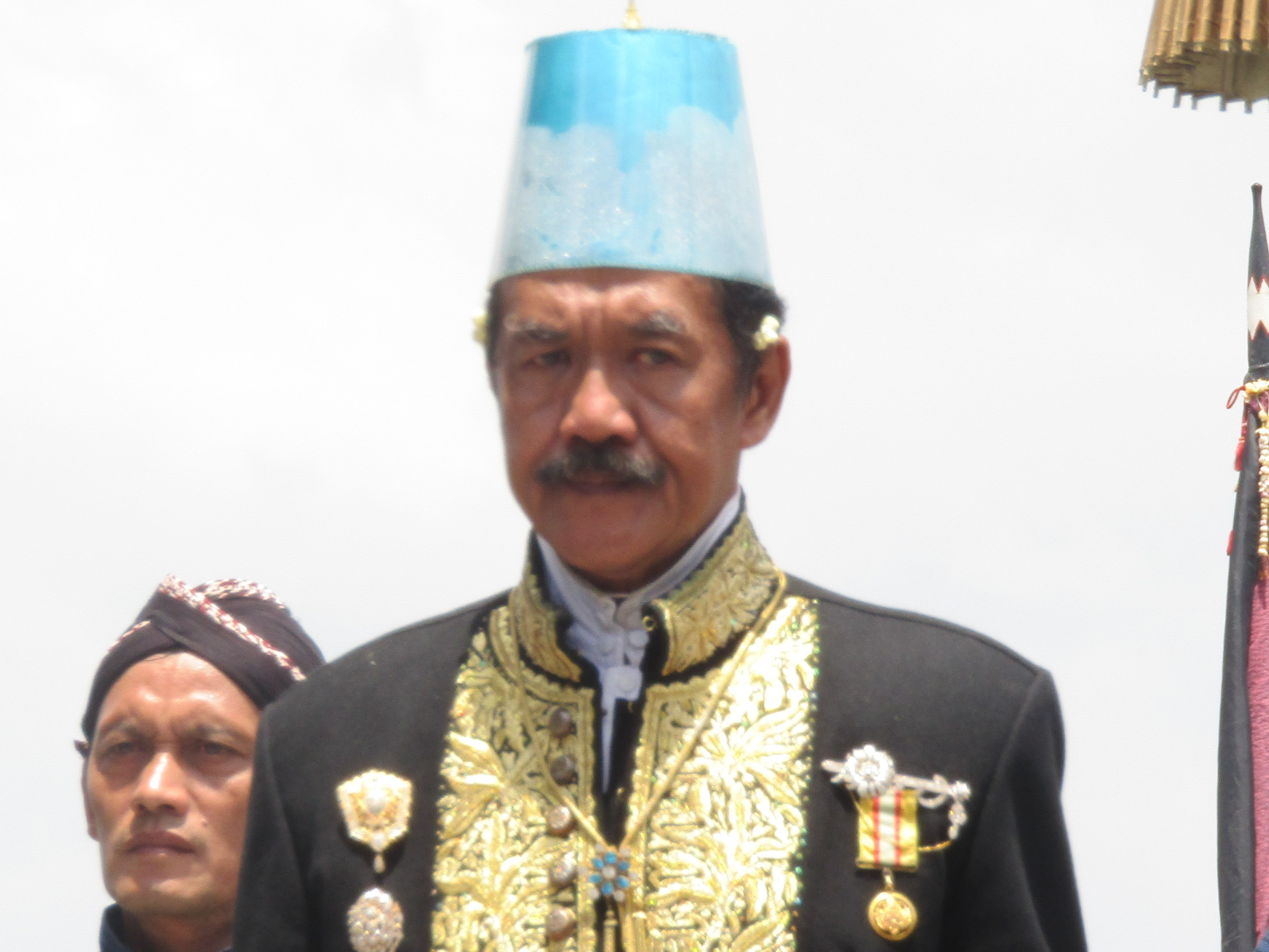
G.B.P.H. Yudhaningrat as Manggalayudha of the Yogyakarta Palace Warriors

bregada Keprajuritan Yogyakarta is currently fostered by Kawedanan Kaprajuritan Karaton Ngayogyakarta Hadiningrat (previously Tepas Kaprajuritan), which was established on March 2, 1971 with the blessing of Sultan Hamengkubuwana IX, and was first fostered by his son, B.R.M. Herdjuno Darpito (now Hamengkubuwana X).

The Yogyakarta Palace's army has a commander called Manggalayudha (Commander of Wadana Hageng Prajurit), who then oversees several Pandhega (Captain/Regent Enèm Wadana Prajurit). Under the command of Pandhega, there are units with distinctive identities that differ from one unit to another. Specialized units, such as Prajurit Bugis and Surakarsa, are led by a Wadana. Currently, in Yogyakarta, the active bregada are bregada Wirabraja, Dhaeng, Patangpuluh, Jagakarya, Prawiratama, Nyutra, Ketanggung, Mantrijero, Bugis, and Surakarsa. In one bregada, there are ranks, namely:

- Prajurit perwira with the rank of panji/lurah as the commander of the troops;
- Flag bearer (dwajadara)

Officers with the rank of sergeant major (puliyer/operwahmester/wirawicitra/wirawredhatama) for Ketanggung and *

- Mantrijero soldiers,
- Non-commissioned officers with the rank of sergeant (wirawredha)
- Enlisted soldiers with the rank of jajar.

Soldiers with complete weaponry are Prajurit Nyutra with four types of weapons: crossbows, rifles, towok (javelins / blunt spears) and shields, as well as sharp spears (waos). Other warriors were armed with rifles and spears. Bugis and Surakarsa warriors were only armed with spears.

Current division
Bregada	Description	Flag	Photo	Toponymic name of village
Wirabraja	Uniform identity: Red chili-shaped hat, blangkon with Himakrendha or wulung batik motif, red knee-length shirt and pants, white undershirt, white rectangular sayak rempelan, lonthong cindhe kembang or plain red, with black kamus wearing timang (buckle), keris warangka branggah, white knee-length socks, black loafers. Flag name: Gula Klapa, mounted on spears named Kyai Slamet and Kyai Santri. Musical instruments: Tambour and flute Gendhing: Retadhedhali (macak), Dhayungan (march)			Wirobrajan
Dhaeng	Uniform identity: Black mancungan hat with red and white quill, blangkon wulung, white sikepan shirt with thick red strips on the sleeves and chest, white undershirt, red triangular sayak with 3 layers of gold edging (for panji and sergeants) or white with silver edging (for jajar tombak), lonthong cindhe kembang or plain blue, with black kamus wearing timang, colorful buntal sash for the ensign and flag bearer, keris warangka gayaman and branggah (for spearmen), white trousers with red strips on the sides, black shoes with laces. Flag name: Bahningsari, mounted on a spear named Kyai Jati Mulya/Dhoyok. Musical instruments: Tambour, flute, pui'-pui', kecer, ketipung-dogdog, big bende and small bende. Gendhing: Kenaba (macak), Ondhal-andhil (march), Beganjar (homage)			Daengan
Patang-Puluh	Uniform identity: Black songkok hat, blangkon with udan liris or wulung batik motif (Jajar), sikepan shirt with lurik motif, red undershirt, green triangular sayak with 3 layers of gold edging (for panji and sergeants) or white with silver edging (for jajar), lonthong cindhe kembang or plain red, with black kamus wearing timang, keris warangka branggah, red shorts outside white trousers, black boots. Flag name: Cakragora, mounted on a spear named Kyai Trisula. Musical instruments: Tambour, flute, trumpet Gendhing: Gendera (macak), Bulu-bulu (march)			Patangpuluhan
Jagakarya	Uniform identity: Black sigar jangkang hat, blangkon with batik motif of celeng kewengen or wulung, lurik knee-length shirt and pants, orange undershirt, white rectangular sayak rempelan, lonthong cindhe kembang or plain red, with black kamus wearing timang, keris warangka branggah, purplish-black knee-length socks, black loafers. Name of flag: Papasan, mounted on a spear named Kyai Trisula. Musical instruments: Tambour, flute, trumpet Gendhing: Slahgendir (macak), Tameng Madura (march)			Jogokaryan
Prawirotama	Uniform identity: Black jangkang wungkul hat, wulung blangkon, black sikepan shirt, white undershirt, green triangular sayak with 3 layers of gold edging (for panji and sergeants) or white with silver edging (for jajar), lonthong cindhe kembang or plain red, with black kamus wearing timang, keris warangka branggah, red shorts outside white trousers, black boots. Flag name: Geniroga/Banteng Ketaton, mounted on a spear named Kyai Trisula. Musical instruments: Tambour, flute, trumpet Gendhing: Balang (macak), Pandenbrug (march)			Prawirotaman
Nyutra	Uniform identity: Black kuluk (musical instrument, panji, rifle soldier, panji towok) or udeng gilig (flag bearer, towok soldier, and spear soldier), red/black vest over yellow long-sleeved shirt, red/black trousers, blue and white bango tulak motif kampuh cloth, green flower lonthong cindhe, keris warangka gayaman, wear leather sandals with straps. Flag name: Podhang ngingsep sari (Nyutra Merah) and Padma-sri-kresna (Nyutra Hitam), mounted on a spear named Kyai Trisula. Musical instruments: Tambour, flute, trumpet Gendhing: Mbat-mbat Penjalin/Tamtama Balik (macak), Surengprang (march)			Nyutran
Ketanggung	Uniform identity: Black mancungan hat, blangkon wulung, sikepan shirt with lurik motif, white undershirt, green triangular sayak with 3 layers of gold edging (for panji and sergeants) or white with silver edging (for jajar), lonthong cindhe kembang with black kamus wearing timang, keris warangka branggah, black shorts outside white trousers, black boots. Flag name: Cakraswandana, mounted on a spear named Kyai Nanggala. Musical instruments: Tambour, flute, trumpet, large and small bende, kecer Gendhing: Bima Kurda (macak), Lintrikmas (march)			Ketanggungan
Mantrijero	Uniform identity: Black songkok hat, blangkon wulung or tepen cuwiri (Langenhastra Punakawan only), lurik knee-length shirt and pants, white undershirt, white rectangular sayak rempelan, lonthong cindhe kembang with black kamus wearing timang, keris warangka branggah, white knee-length socks, black loafers. Flag name: Purnamasiddhi, mounted on a spear named Kyai Cakra. Musical instruments: Tambour, flute, trumpet Gendhing: Slahgunder (macak), Plangkenan and Mars Setok (march)			Mantrijeron
Bugis	Uniform identity: Dandangan hat (blangkon-fitted top hat), blangkon wulung, black shirt and trousers, lonthong cindhe kembang or yellow, with black kamus wearing timang, keris warangka gayaman, black loafers. Flag name: Wulandadari (formerly Katiga-warna) Musical instruments: Tambur, pui'-pui', kecer, ketipung-dogdog, large bende and small bende. Gendhing: Indraloka (march)			Bugisan
Surakarsa	Uniform identity: Blangkon with celeng kewengen motif, knee-length white shirt and pants, white underwear, lonthong cindhe kembang, with black dictionary wearing timang, batik cloth with supit urang usage procedure, keris warangka branggah, black loafers. Flag name: Pare Anom (previously Triwarna) Musical instruments: Tambour, flute Gendhing: Tameng Madura and Barangan (march)			Surokarsan

=== Pakualaman ===
The Pakualaman army has a leader, Pandega, who then oversees two bregada. The two Pakualaman bregadas that are still active today are bregada Lombok Abang and bregada Plangkir. During the Grebeg ceremony, bregada Lombok Abang marches in front of the gunungan, while bregada Plangkir marches behind it. Bregada Lombok Abang was recruited from the Gladag courtiers who accompanied the death ceremonies of Pakualaman nobles. They were then made into a bregada tasked with escorting the Duke of Paku Alam when attending official events. Meanwhile, the Plangkir bregada is taken from the infantry and cavalry troops of the Legiun Pakualaman who have defense duties. Inside Pura Pakualaman, these two soldiers take turns to guard every 35 days.

current division
Bregada	Description	Photo
Lombok Abang	Identity uniform: Red headgear, shirt, and pants. Weapons: Spear Musical instruments: Tambour, flute, bende, kecer	
Plangkir	Identity uniform: Black hat and shirt, white trousers, shoes. Weapons: Rifle Musical instruments: Tambour	

=== People's bregada ===
The popularity of bregada keraton warriors among the people of Yogyakarta has led many people to create their own styles of warriors, because they have their own characteristics. The general public who are concerned with the art of Yogyakarta-style soldiering have formed a new bregada creation, known as the people's bregada. Generally, folk bregada is formed in rural areas, which still uphold traditional customs and cultural preservation. Many folk bregada are performed in traditional ceremonies in rural areas, such as merti dusun.

As these units grew, on January 19, 2014, the first Bregada Rakyat Festival was held. The festival was held to commemorate 'Yogyakarta the City of the Republic', which is celebrated every January 4. The festival was organized by the Yogyakarta Cultural Office in collaboration with Ngayogyakarta Hadiningrat Palace and Puro Pakualaman. The festival provided a total prize money of Rp16.6 million for the bregada that won the championship for the most pompous, unique, and disciplined. The assessment was done directly from both the temple and the palace.

This festival is routinely held every year. To encourage the creativity of People's bregada, on October 15, 2021, the DIY Specialty Secretariat held a gendhing creation training for the People's bregada. The aim was to build the identity of the People's bregada through the gendhings they play. This continued effort also occurred on 11 September 2022 when the DIY Cultural Office held a Workshop on Strengthening National Insight and Cultural Values for Performers of DIY Folk Art. In the workshop, each bregada is free to create clothing, weapons, choreography, accessories, and gendhing creation but must not resemble the Palace Soldiers or Pakualaman Soldiers.
