= Bicorne =

Cocked hat with two sides of the brim turned up against the crown

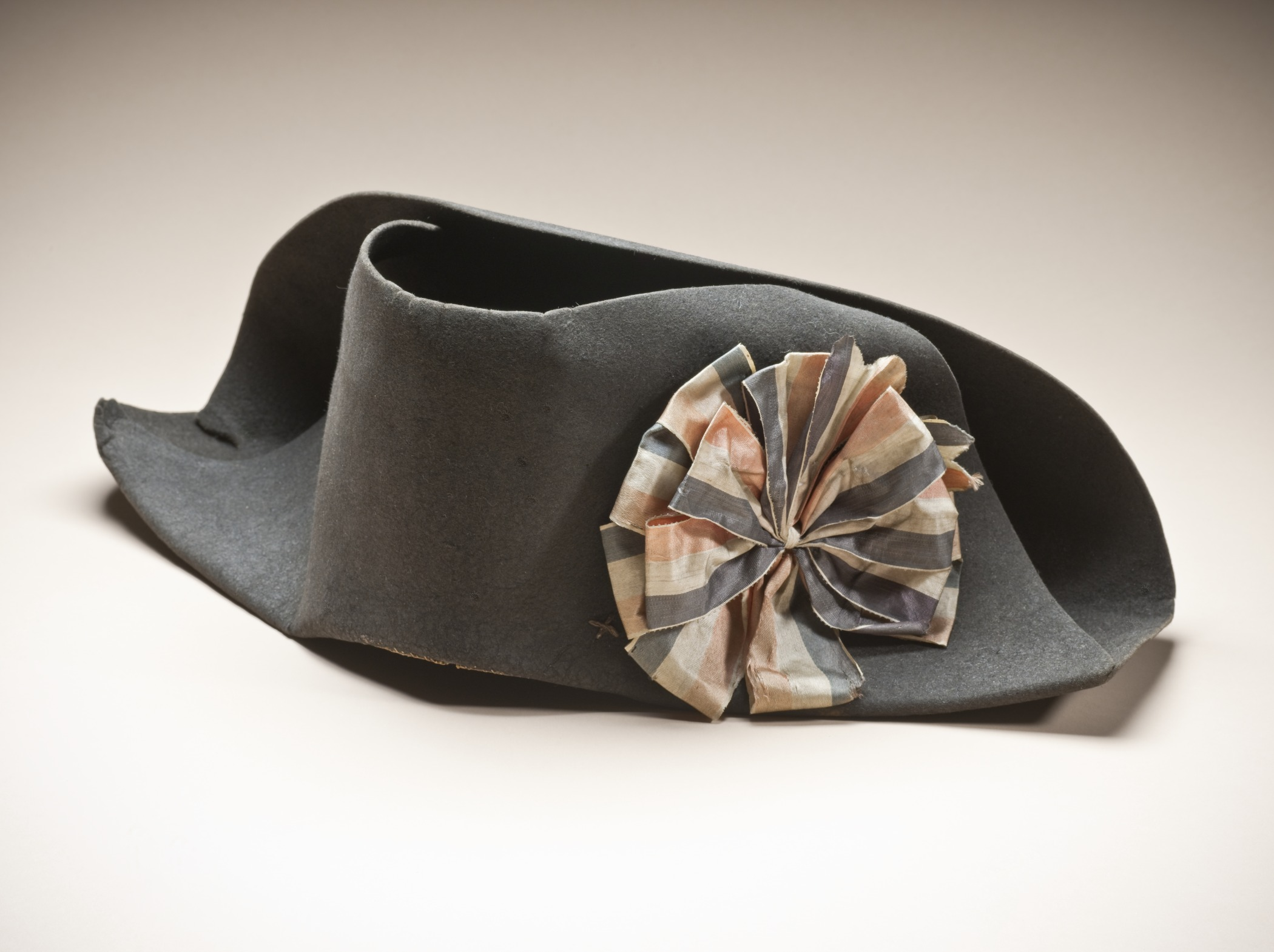
Early bicorne from France, c. 1790

The bicorne or bicorn (two-cornered) is a hat widely adopted in the 1790s as a form of military headgear by European militaries. Bicornes saw widespread usage during the French Revolutionary and Napoleonic Wars, and the hat survived as widely-worn full-dress headdress until the 20th century.

== Historic use ==
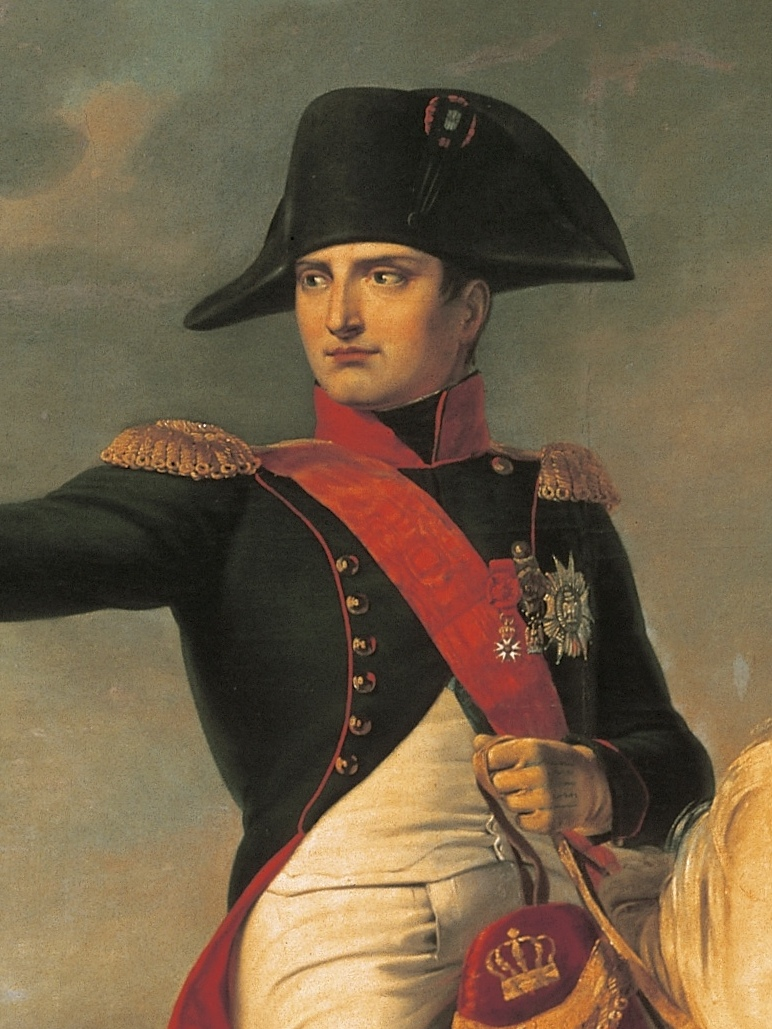
Napoléon Bonaparte in his characteristic side-to-side bicorne hat (detail from an 1810 painting by Joseph Chabord)

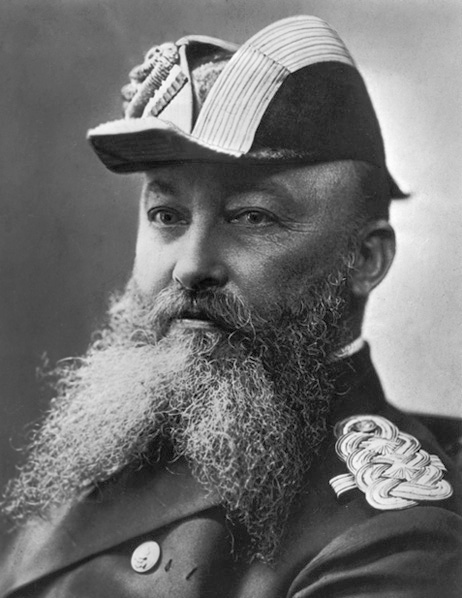
Grand Admiral Alfred von Tirpitz wearing a fore-and-aft bicorne (photograph from World War I-era postcard)

Descended from the tricorne, the black-coloured bicorne originally had a rather broad brim, with the front and the rear halves turned up and pinned together forming a semi-circular fan shape; there was usually a cockade in the national colours at the front. Later, the hat became more triangular in shape, with its two ends becoming more pointed, and it was worn with the cockade at the right side. That kind of bicorne eventually became known in English as the cocked hat, but it is still known in French as the bicorne.

Worn in the side-to-side athwart style during the 1790s, the bicorne became normally seen fore-and-aft in most armies and navies from 1800. The change in style coincided with the flattening out of the pronounced front peak of the original headdress. The French gendarmerie continued to wear their bicornes in the classic side-to-side fashion until about 1904, and the Italian Carabinieri still do so in their modern full dress.

Some forms of bicorne were designed to be folded flat so that they could be conveniently tucked under the arm when they were not being worn. A bicorne of such a style is also known as a chapeau-bras or chapeau-de-bras.

The bicorne was widely worn until World War I as part of the full dress of officers of most of the world's navies. It survived to a more limited extent between the wars for wear by senior officers in the British, French, US, Japanese and other navies until World War II but has now almost disappeared in that context.

It was also worn during the 19th and the early 20th centuries by civilian officials in European monarchies and Japan when required to wear uniforms on formal occasions. The practice generally ceased after World War I except in the context of diplomatic uniform. British colonial governors in temperate climates and governors general in some countries of the Commonwealth (notably Australia, Canada and New Zealand) continued to wear bicornes with ceremonial dress until the second half of the 20th century.

== Cocked hat ==
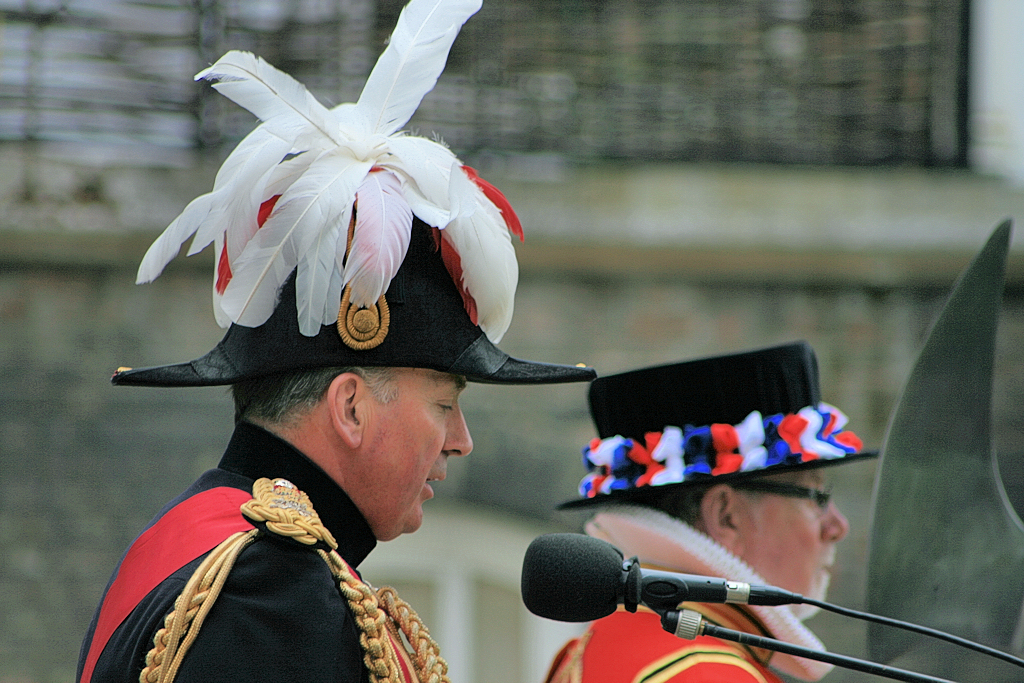
British Army cocked hat with General officer's plume, worn by Lord Dannatt (Constable of the Tower)

By the 20th century, the term cocked hat had come to be used more often than not in official British usage (uniform regulations etc.) with reference to that shape of hat (particularly when worn as part of a uniform), but in the rare instances that hats were directed to be worn side-to-side ('athwarts') rather than front-to-back, such as by footmen in full state livery, the term bicorn tended to be preferred.

In its most commonly-seen form at the time, the cocked hat was pinned up at two sides to form a hump-back bridge shape and was worn perpendicular to the shoulders, with the front end above the face and the back end over the nape. A cockade in the national colours might be worn at the right side (French tradition), and a plume might be attached to the top (British military c. 1800). Cocked hats were often trimmed with gold or silver bullion lace and tassels. Naval officers wore them without further decorations, but those worn by military and civilian officials might be lavishly decorated with coloured ostrich or swan feathers.

The cocked hat still remains the "Full Dress headdress of General and Staff Officers and certain others" and is worn in public by certain office-holders such as the Major-General commanding the Household Division, Gold Stick and Silver Stick and the Constable of the Tower.

== Current use ==
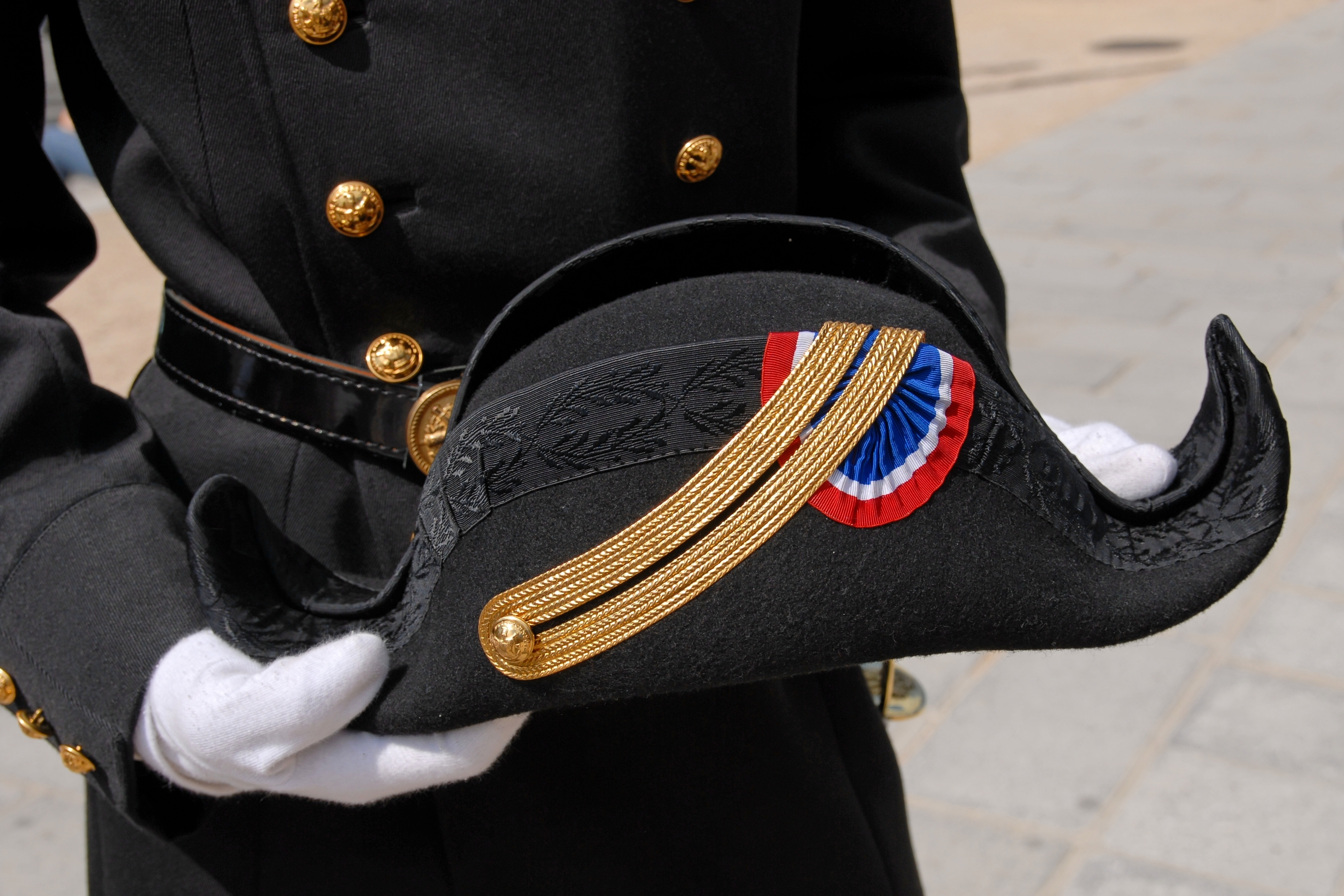
The full-dress uniform of École Polytechnique of France comprises black trousers with a red stripe, a coat with golden buttons and a belt, and a cocked hat (officially called a bicorne).

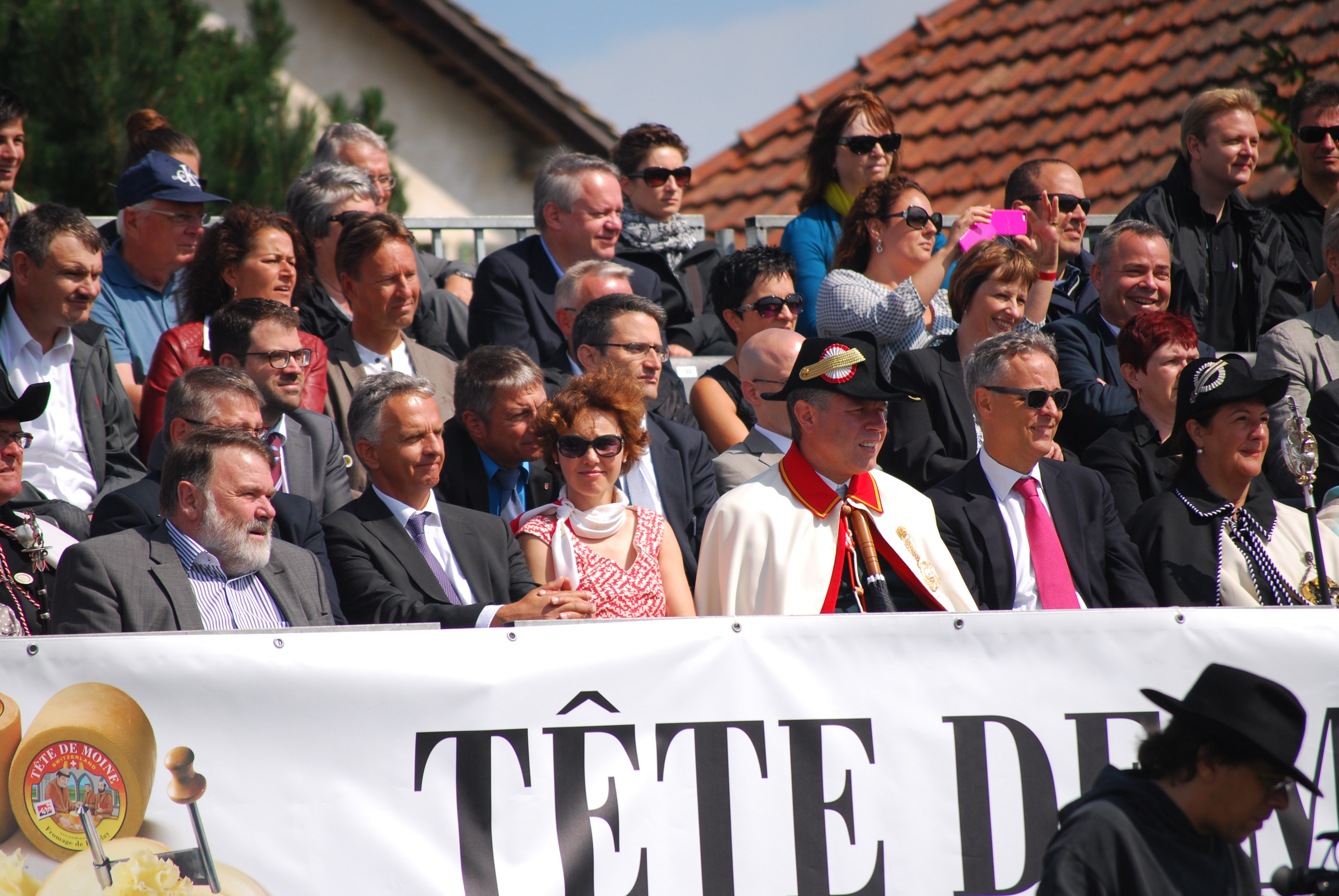
A state usher accompanying a federal councillor in Switzerland

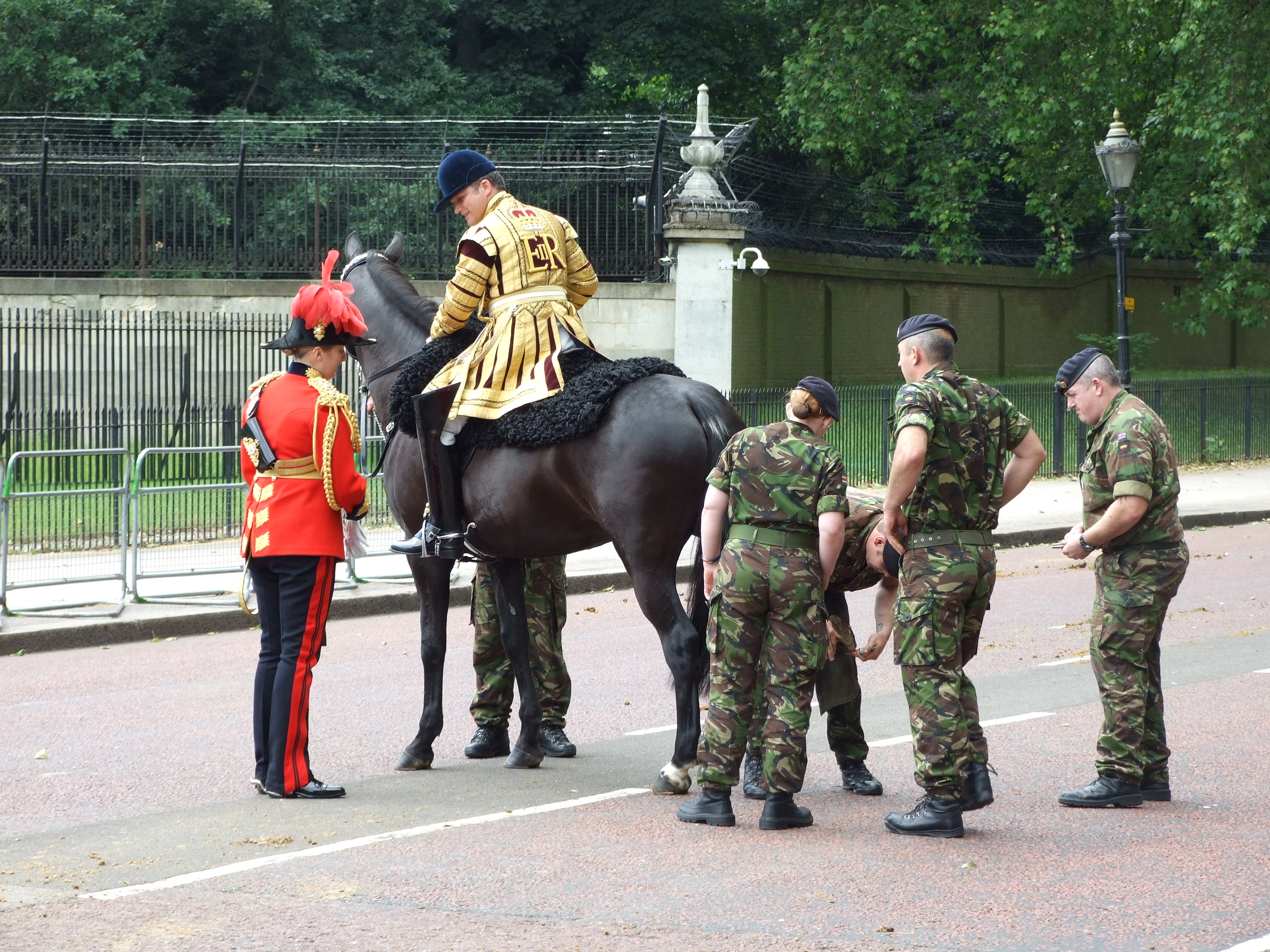
Veterinary Officer of the UK Household Cavalry wearing her distinctive red-plumed cocked hat in place of the usual helmet (2010)

Members of the Académie française wear the habit vert (green habit) at the Académie's ceremonies. The habit includes a black jacket and a bicorne in the cocked-hat style, each embroidered in green.

Students at the École Polytechnique wear a bicorne as part of their Grand Uniforme (GU). Female students used to wear a tricorne hat but now also wear a bicorne. The bicorne also formed part of the historic black and red full dress of cadets at the French Military Medical School (École de Santé des Armées) until this uniform was withdrawn in 1971, except for limited use on special occasions. The bicorne is still worn by the members of the Cadre Noir in full dress uniform.

The uniform of the horsemen of the Spanish Riding School of Vienna includes a bicorne.

Diplomatic uniforms, worn on such occasions as the presentation of credentials by ambassadors, normally included bicornes worn with feathers and gold or silver braiding. Until World War II such uniforms were worn by even junior embassy staff but now survive only for ambassadors in a few long-established diplomatic services such as those of Britain, France, Sweden, Belgium and Spain.

In the United Kingdom cocked hats continue to be worn by certain office-holders on special occasions:

- On occasions in Parliament when the King is represented by Lords Commissioners (e.g. at Prorogation) the Lords Commissioners wear plain black bicorne hats with their parliamentary robes (except the Lord Chancellor who, if present, wears his tricorne).
- At the annual Trooping the Colour in London, the Major-General commanding the Household Division wears full dress uniform (as does his chief of staff) consisting of a scarlet tunic and a cocked hat with swan-feather plume. Similar hats with distinctive upright plumes are worn by the Equerries on this and other State occasions.
- Senior officers holding certain royal or special appointments also wear cocked hats (e.g. officers of the Royal Hospital Chelsea, officers of the Yeomen of the Guard, etc.).
- In most British regiments prior to 1914, certain Regimental Staff officers in full-dress uniform wore cocked hats in place of the usual regimental headdress. Since then, the use of full dress has been largely restricted to the Household Division, which maintains the tradition: quartermasters wear cocked hats with a feather of regimental colour, whilst Veterinary Officers and Medical Officers wear cocked hats with a red feather plume and black feather plume respectively.
- Commissioners of the Metropolitan Police Service and City of London Police in full dress uniform.
- Governors of United Kingdom overseas territories may wear a cocked hat with white swan-feather plume, or in tropical territories, a plumed pith helmet. Usage has declined since a 2001 decision by HM Treasury that the overseas territorial government concerned would be responsible for meeting the cost of their governor's optional ceremonial uniforms.
- A cocked hat is still sometimes seen as part of Court uniform and dress in the United Kingdom.

In the Knights of Columbus, Fourth Degree Knights of the Color Corps wore regalia which included a chivalric chapeau. The color of the plume denoted the office held by the wearer. A new uniform with a beret replacing the cocked hat was announced in 2017 and the old uniform gradually phased out over the following several years.

The Italian Carabinieri wear a bicorn with points sideways with their full dress uniform. The large tricolor cockade in front has given it the popular name of la "lucerna", the "lamp".

In Java, cocked hat is still used as a part of Dhaeng and Ketanggung Bregadas' parade uniform from the Yogyakarta Sultanate. Since the end of the Java War, and as a result of some drastic reductions in the period before and after the war, they no longer have combat capability as a fighting troops in general. Known in Javanese as mancungan hat, because of its shape like a pointed nose, mancung, the mancungan only appears on special occasions, such as Grebeg and other cultural or ceremonial events held by the kraton (palace). The headgear came as a part of Western influence in Yogyakarta during the reign of Sultan Hamengkubuwana IV.

The uniform of a Field marshal of the Imperial Ethiopian Army, which was used during the early 20th century by Emperor Haile Selassie, had a Bicorne which was specially adorned with a golden lion's mane.

== Gallery ==
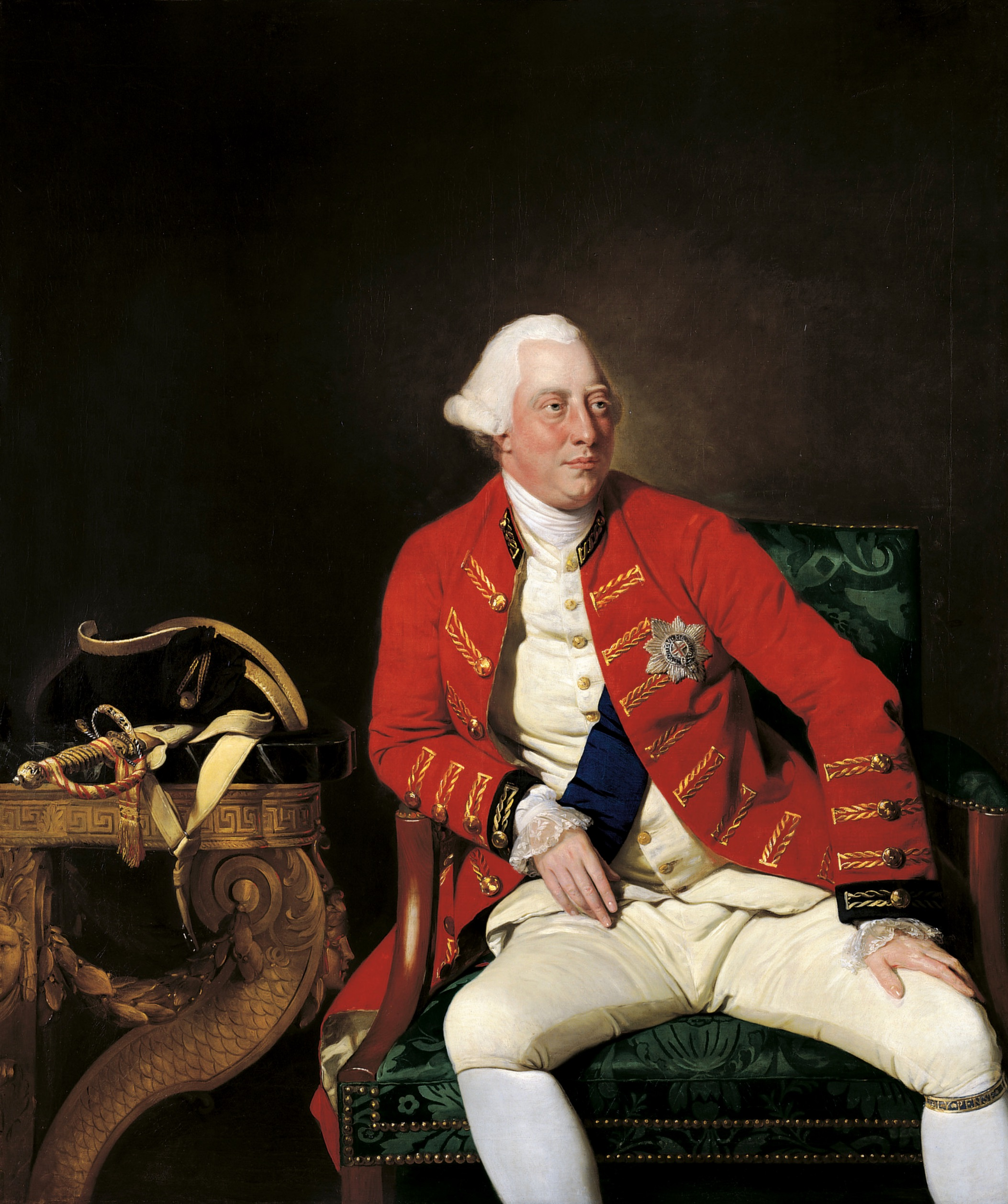
Portrait of King George III with a bicorne hat on the table, Johan Zoffany, 1771.

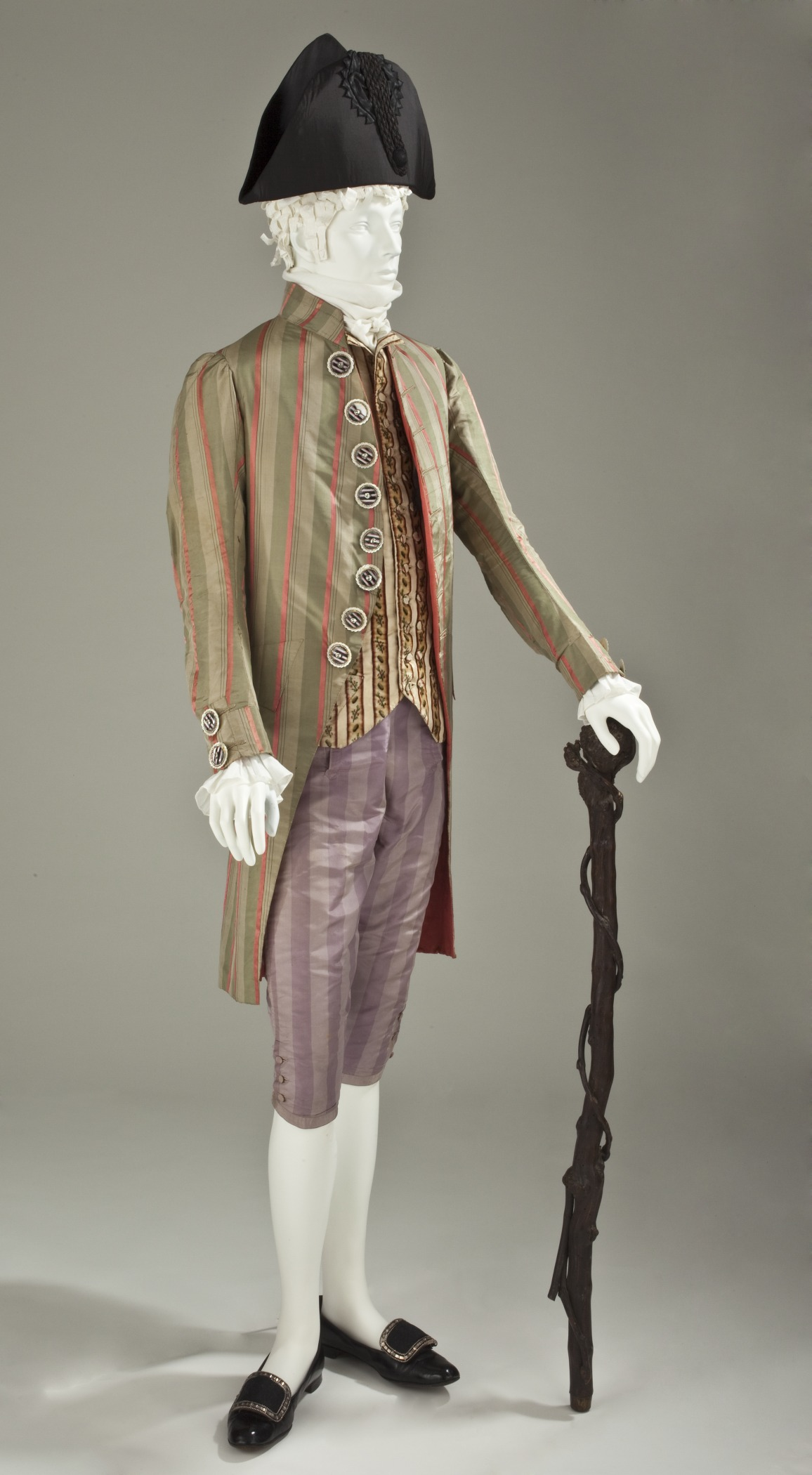
French suit from 1790 to 1795 with a bicorne hat.

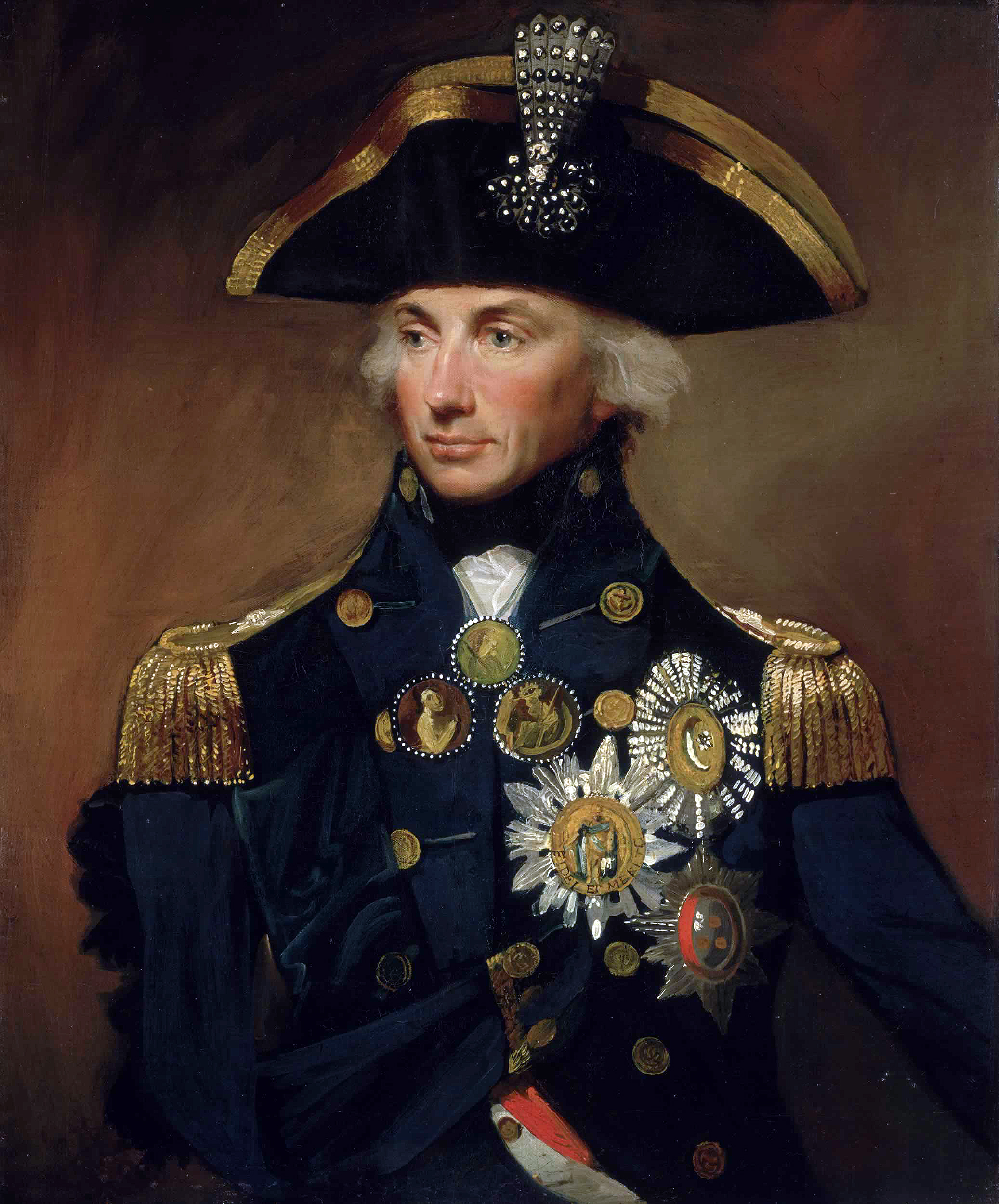
Horatio Nelson with his bicorn hat (complete with jewelled chelengk decoration) in 1799.

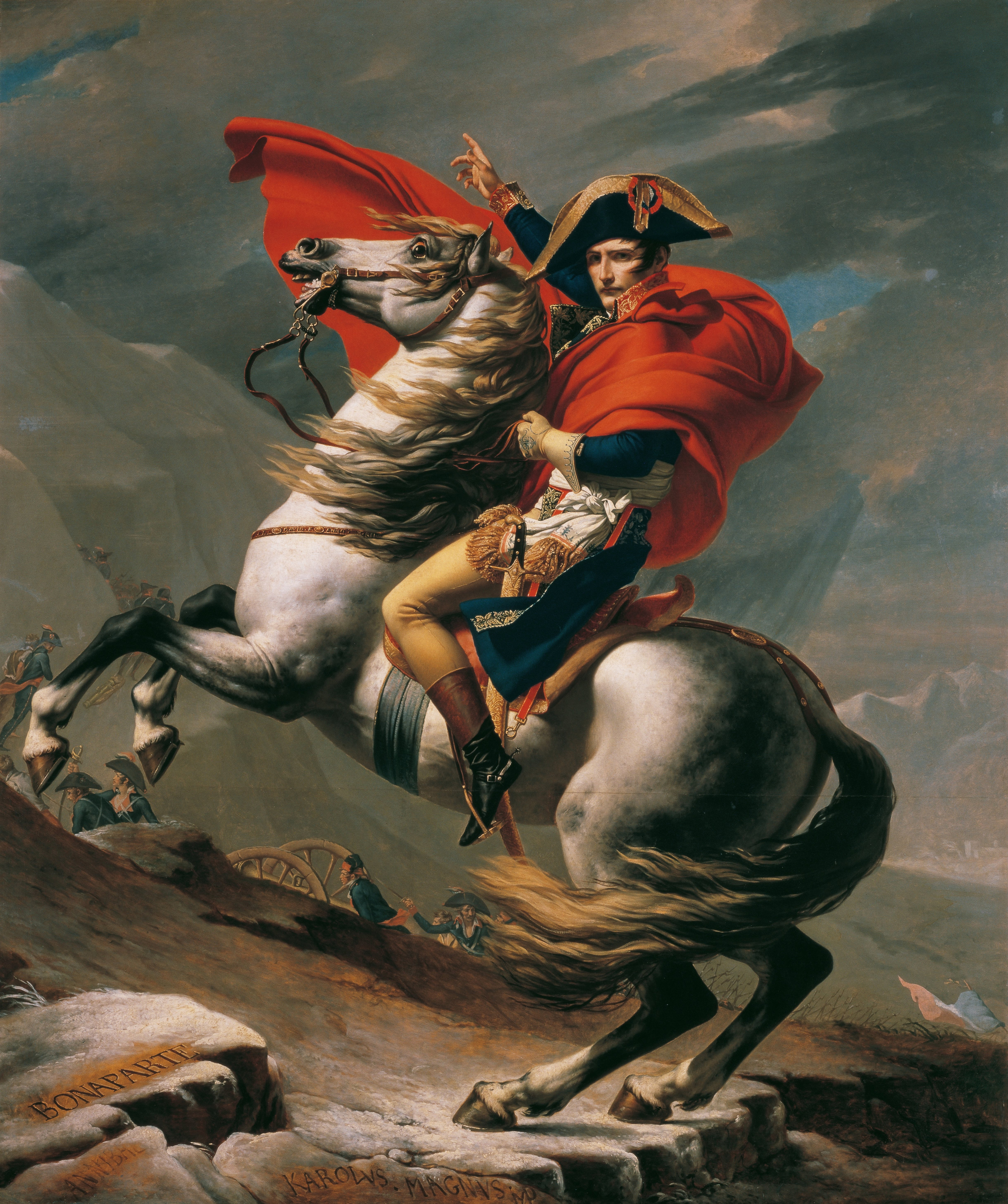
Napoleon Crossing the Alps at the Great St Bernard Pass (1800) by Jacques-Louis David.

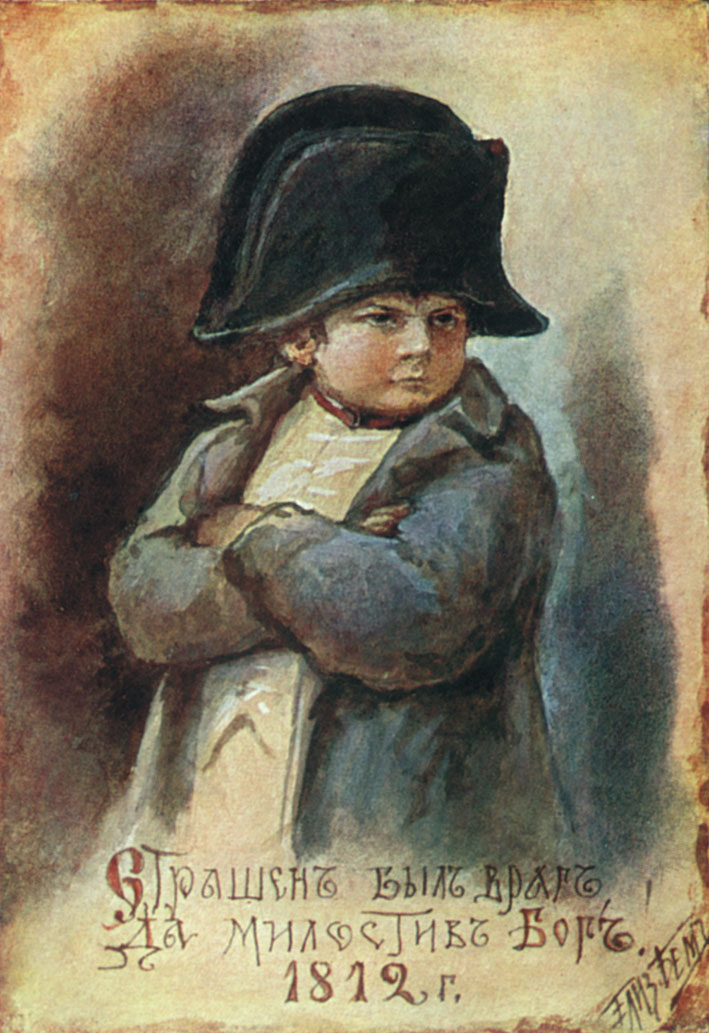
Napoleon (The Enemy was terrible but God is merciful) by Elisabeth Bohm (1914 or earlier).

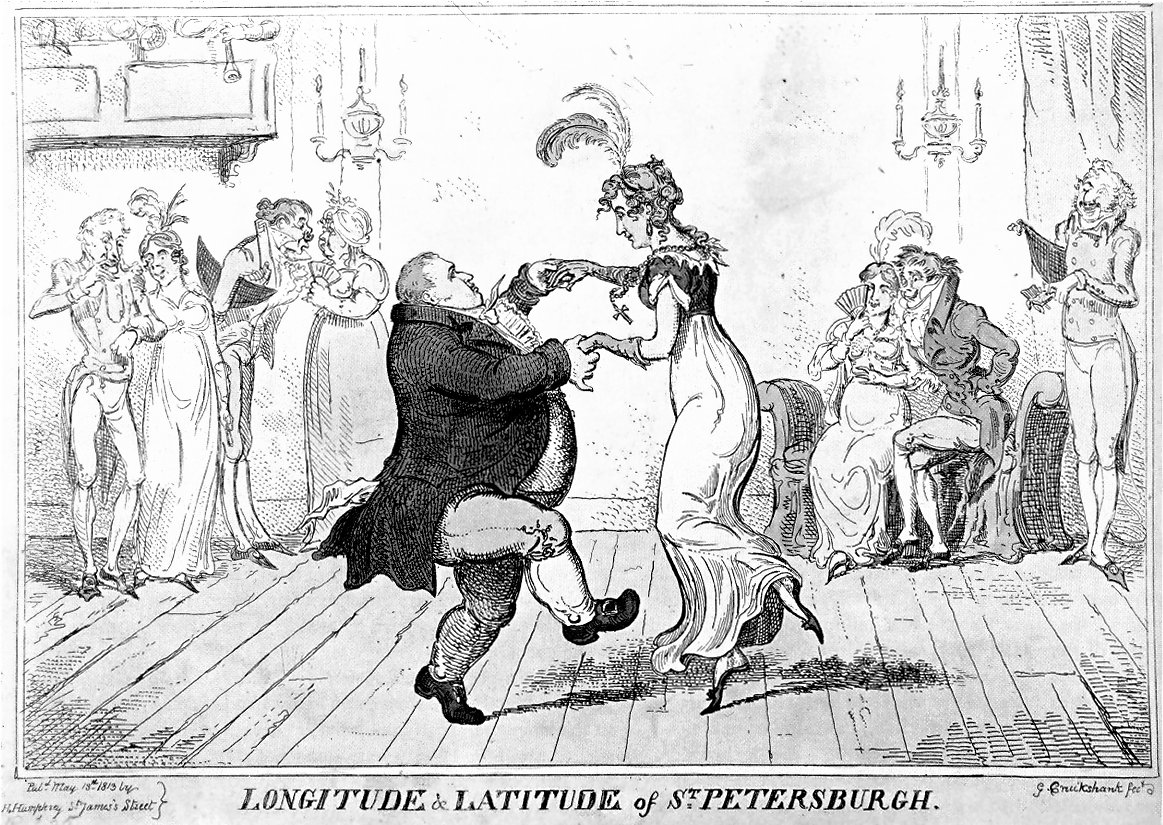
1813 cartoon showing men with collapsible bicornes tucked under their arms.

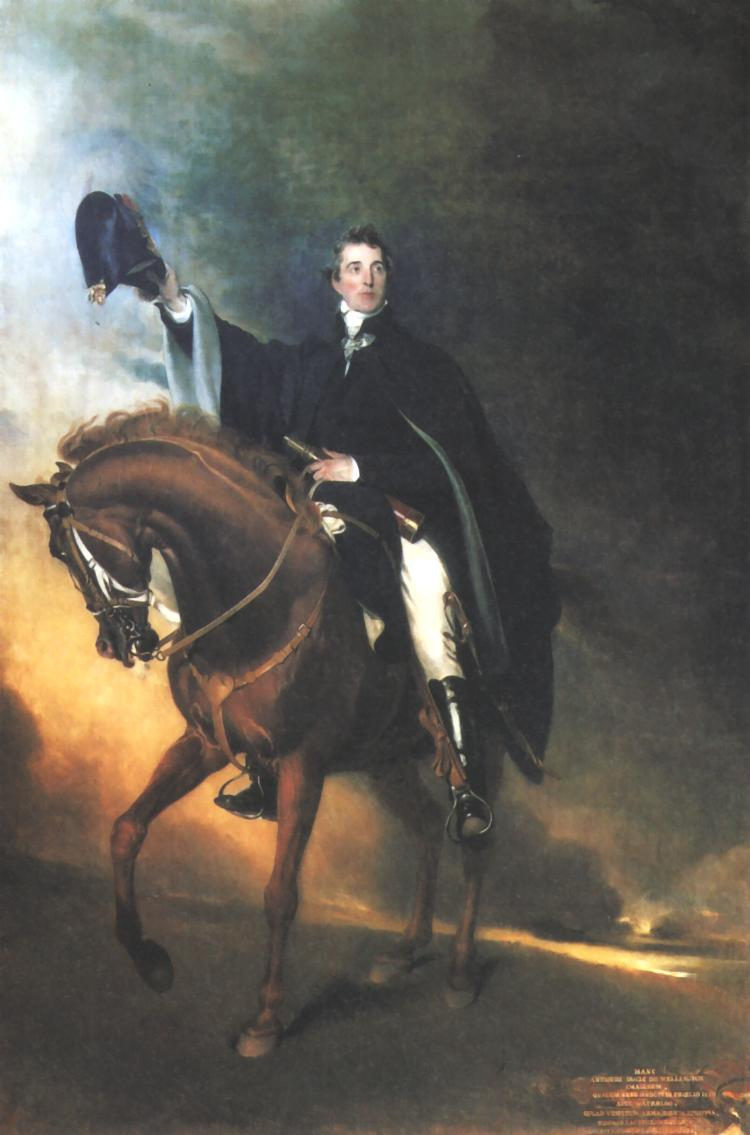
The Duke of Wellington astride Copenhagen, holding his bicorn hat (1818)

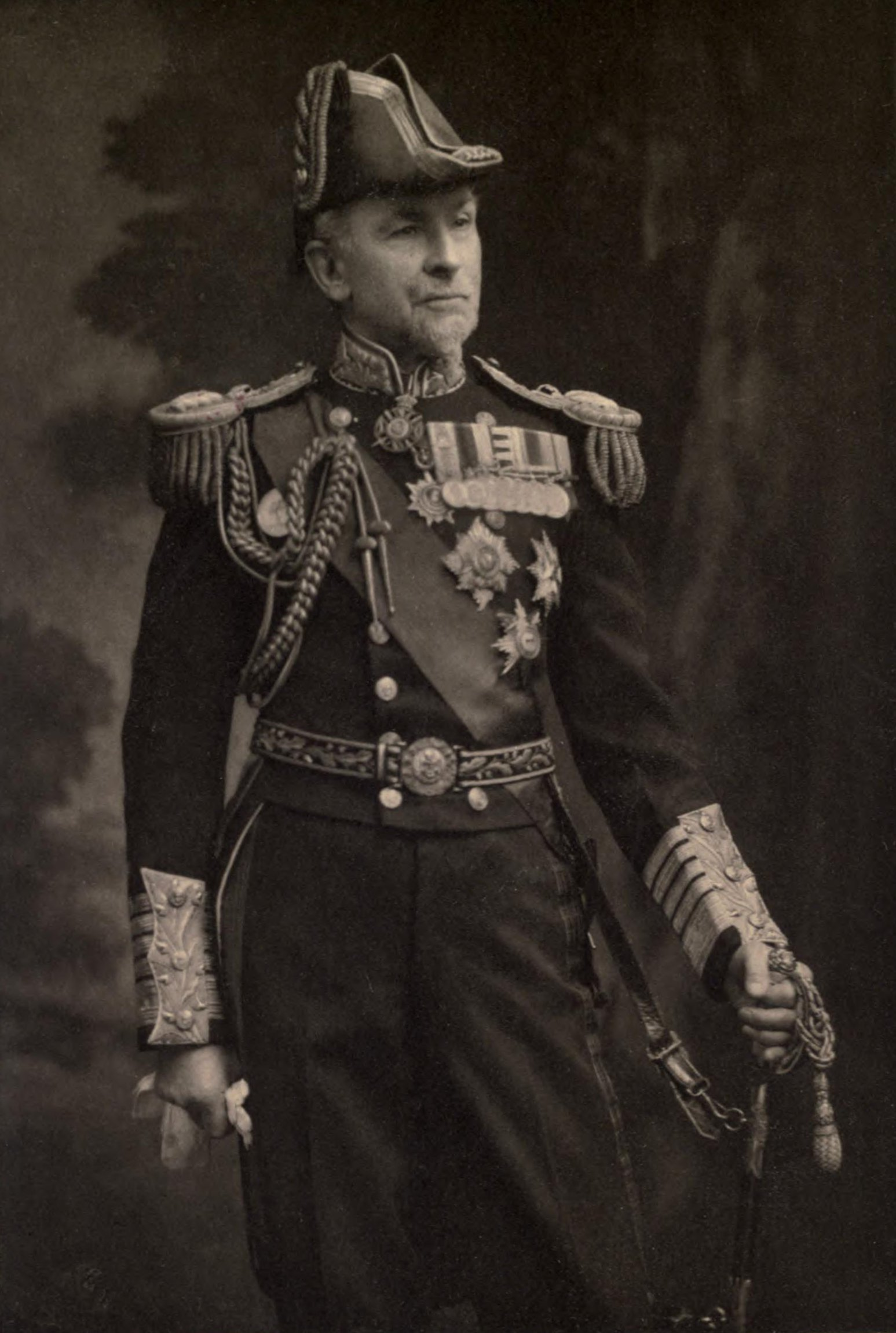
Sir Edward Seymour in 1911. Until 1956, Royal Navy officers in full-dress wore cocked hats.

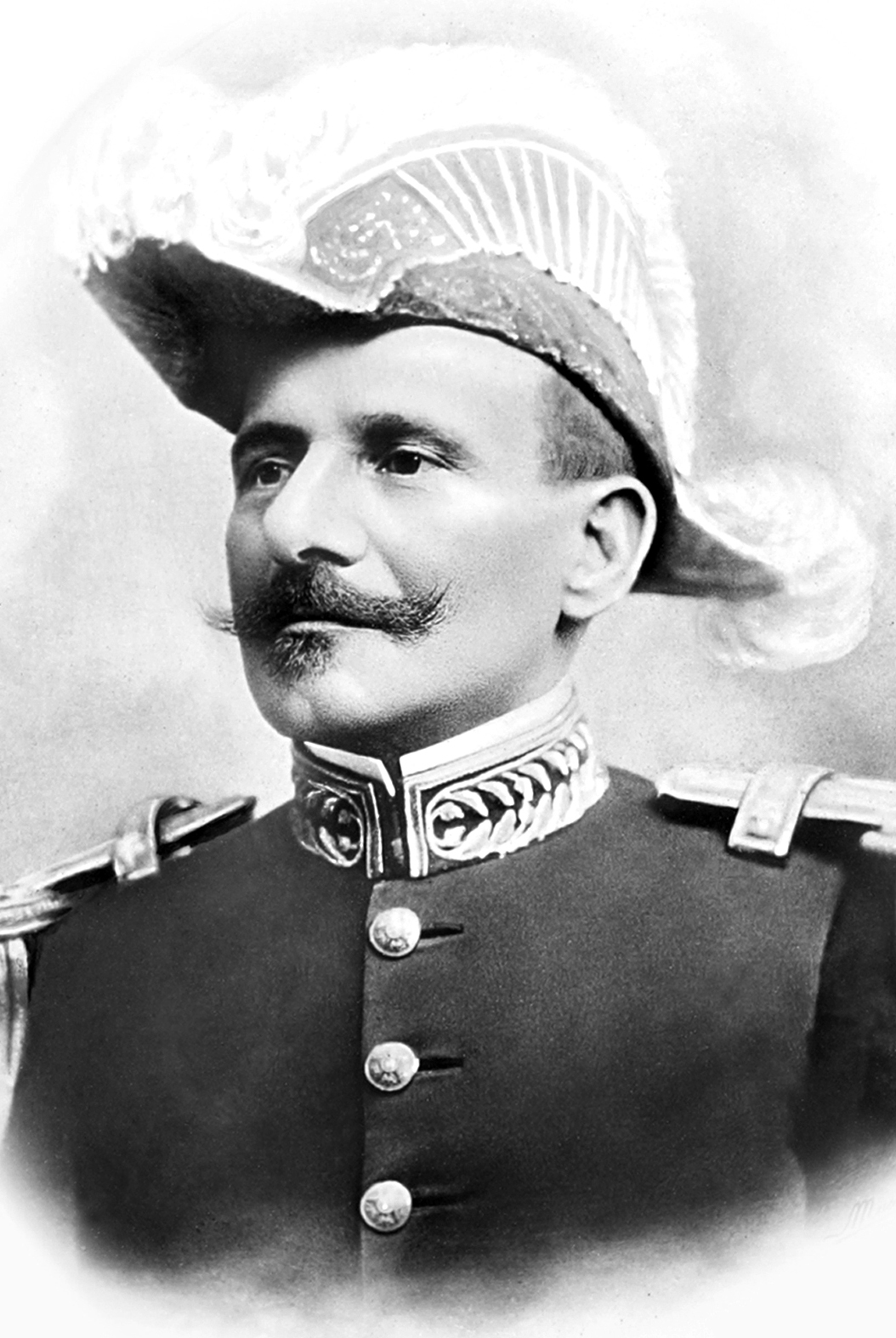
Marshal Hermes da Fonseca, President of Brazil, wearing a bicorne, 1910.

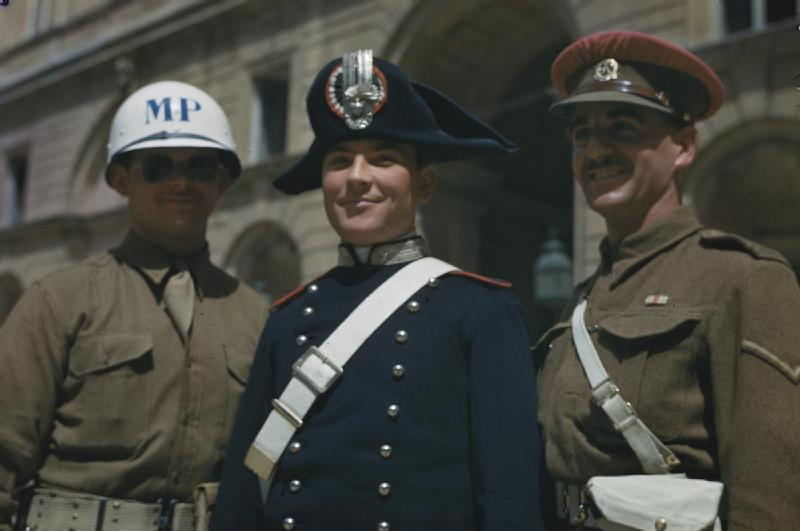
An Italian Carabiniere wearing bicorne (centre), alongside American (left) and British (right) military policemen, 1944.

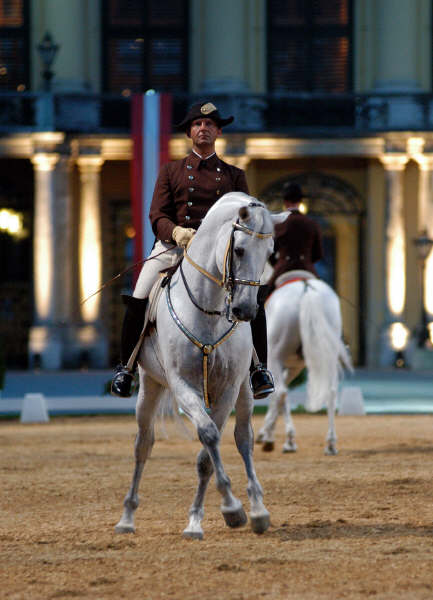
Rider wearing a bicorne at the Spanish Riding School in Vienna, 2006.

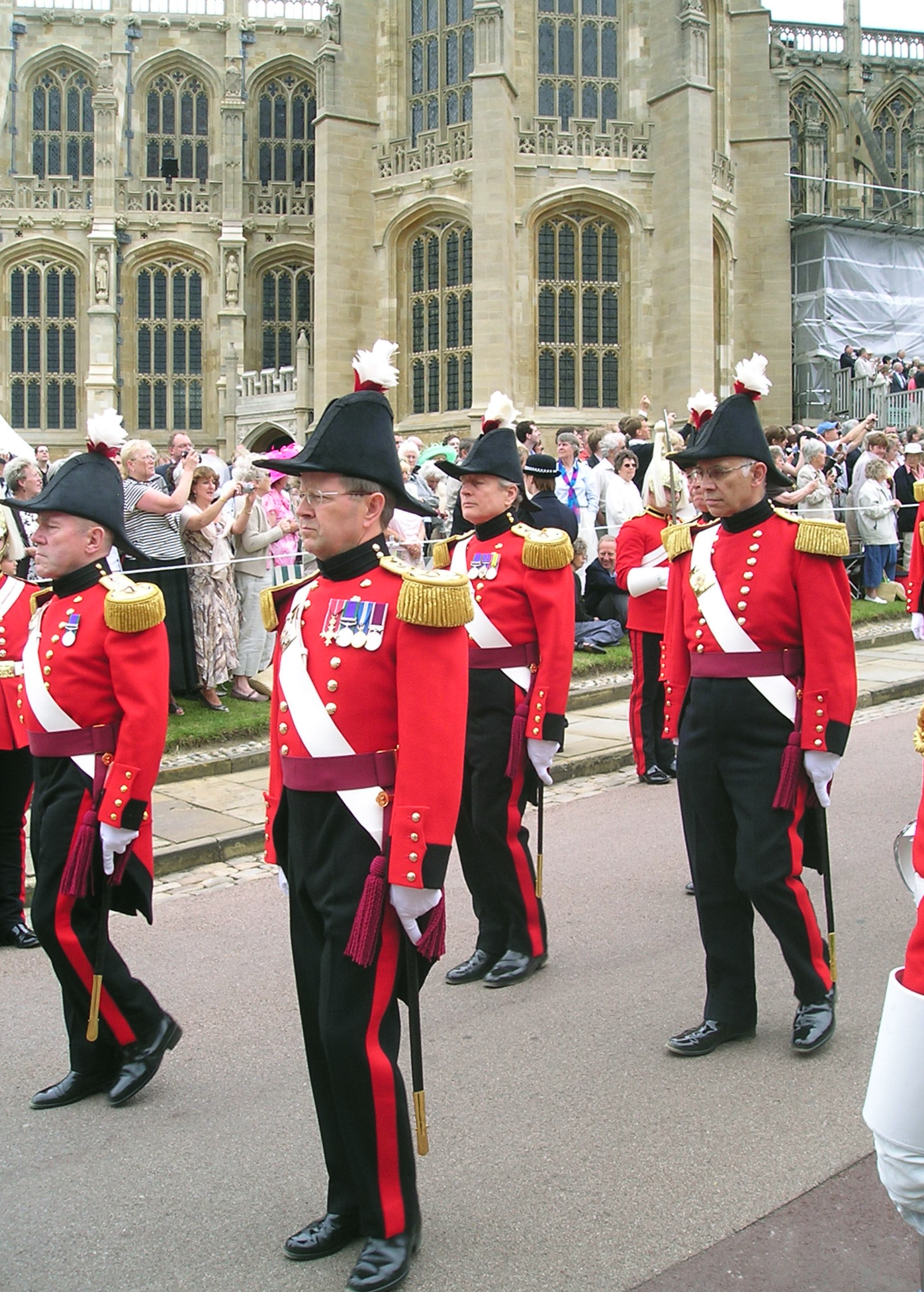
Military Knights of Windsor wearing cocked hats, 2006.

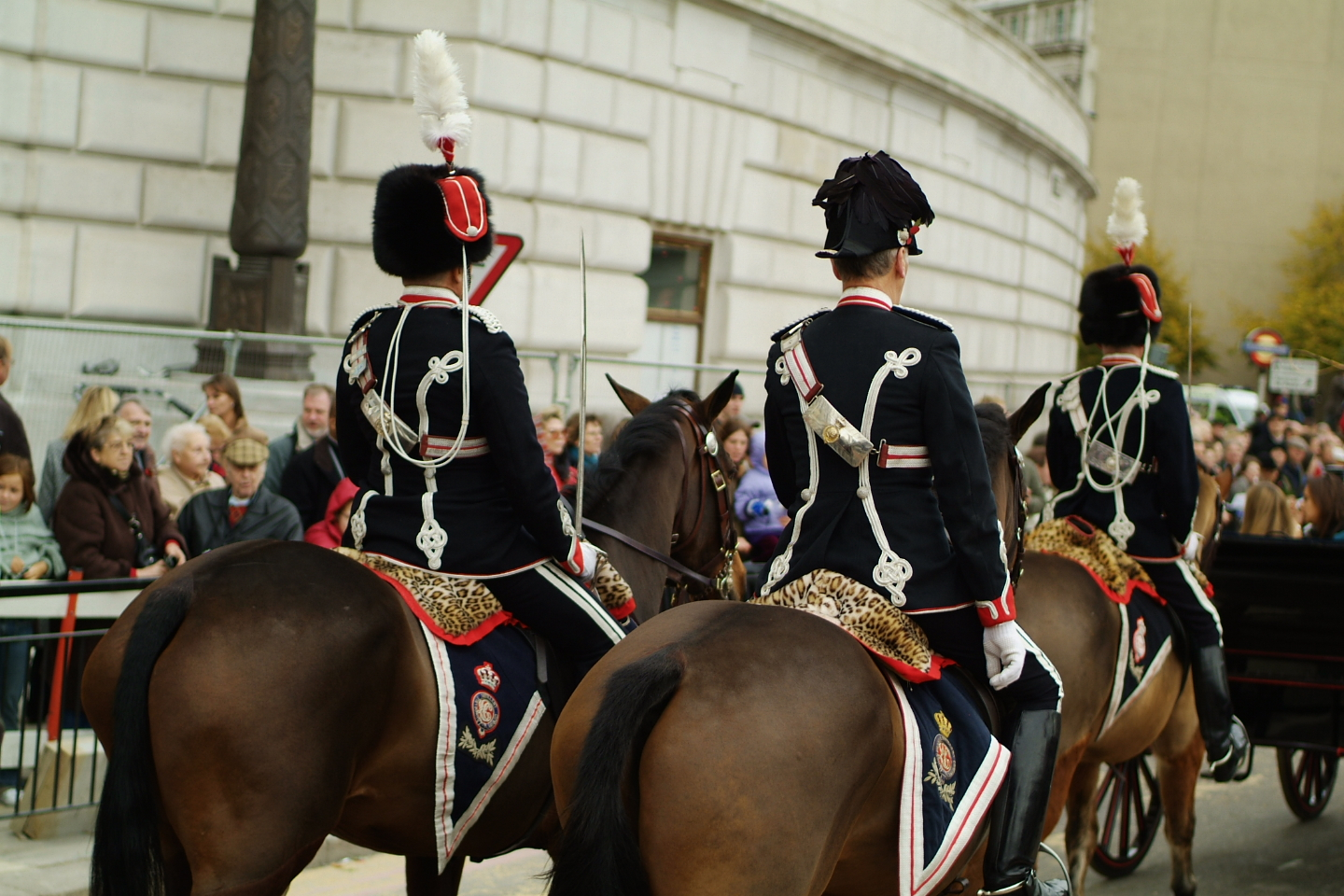
Light Cavalry, Honourable Artillery Company (UK): the medical officer wears a cocked hat in place of the usual busby, 2006.

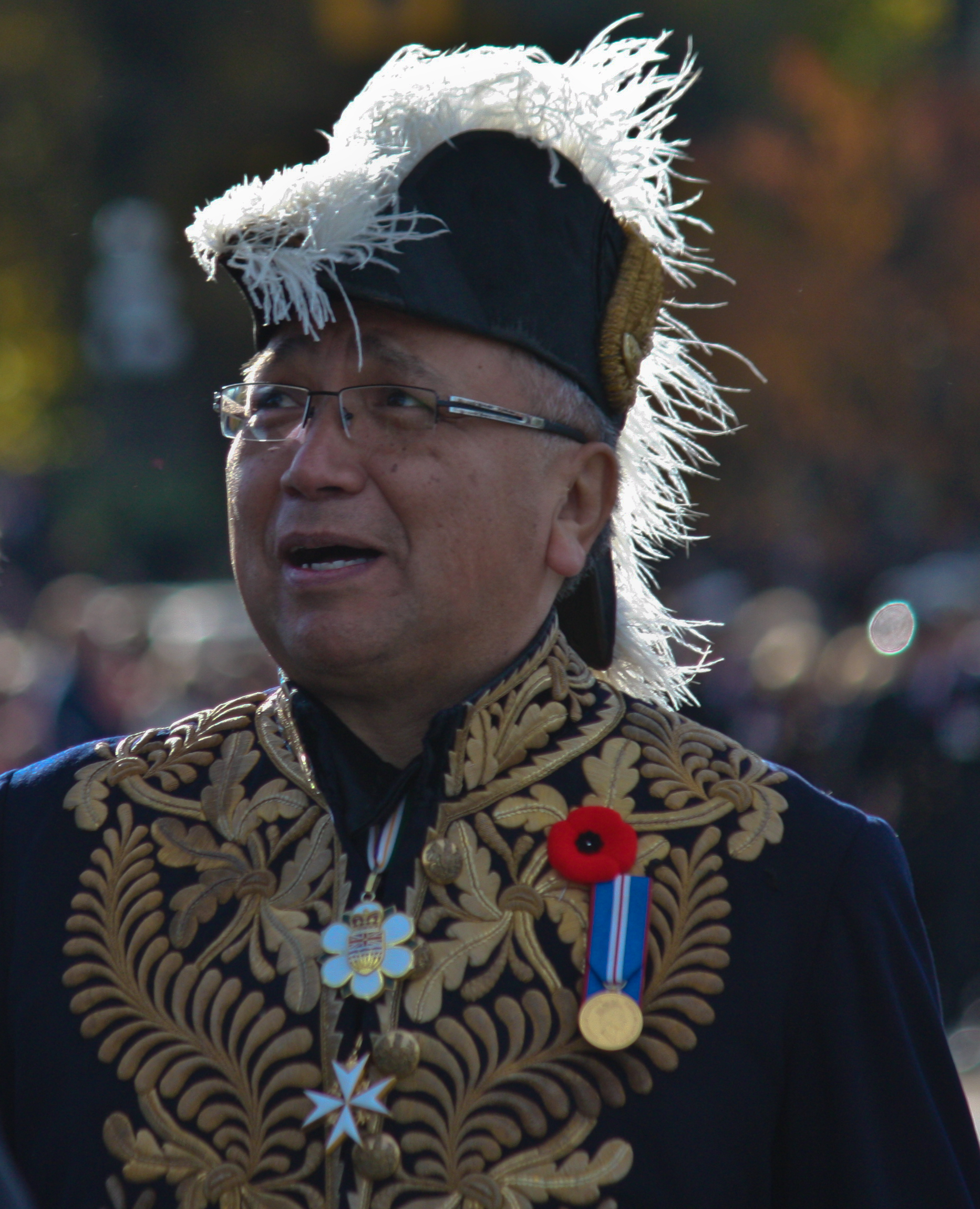
Diplomatic uniform cocked hat worn by the Lieutenant Governor of British Columbia, 2009.

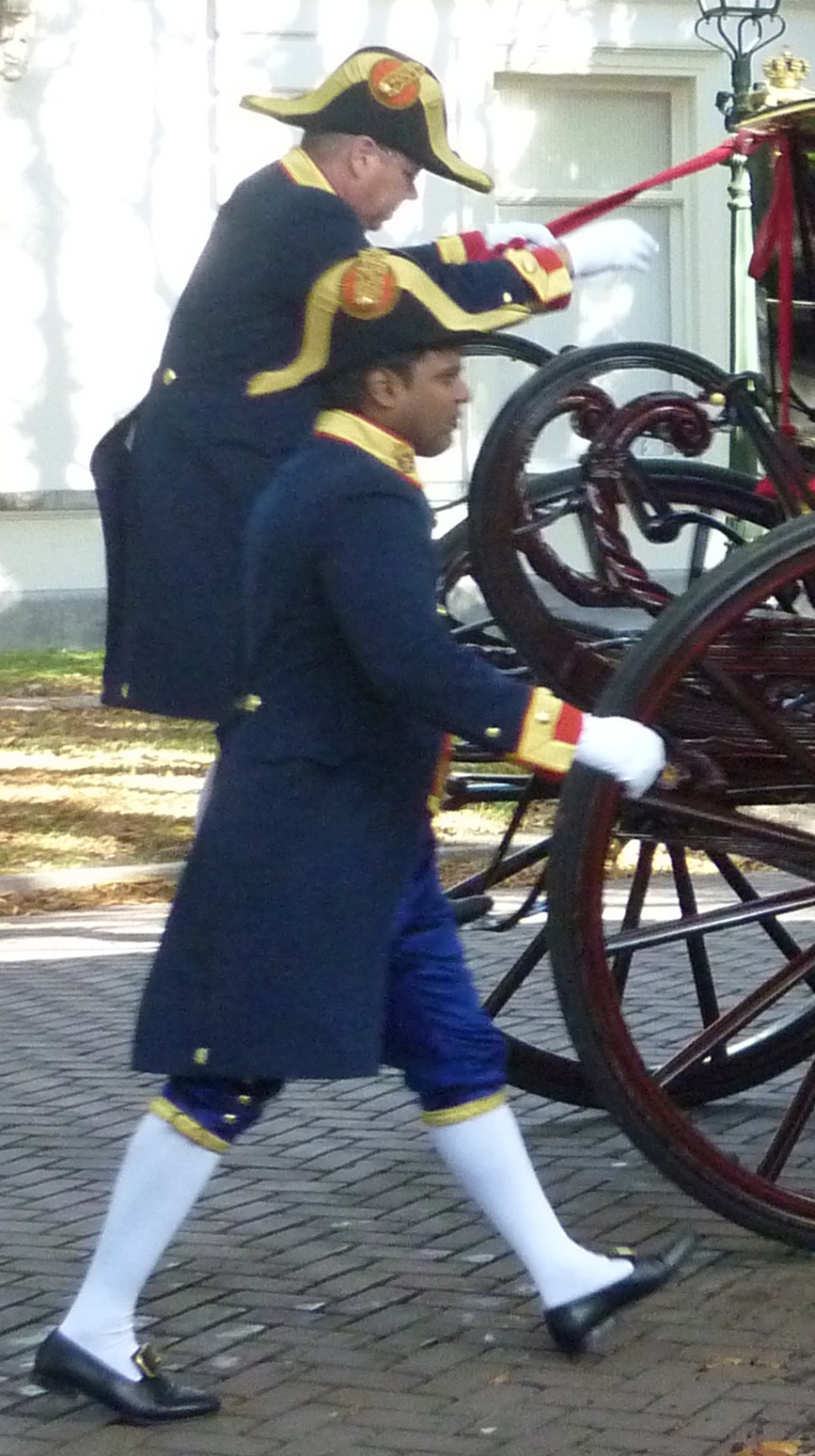
Royal Footmen at The Hague, Netherlands, in 2010.

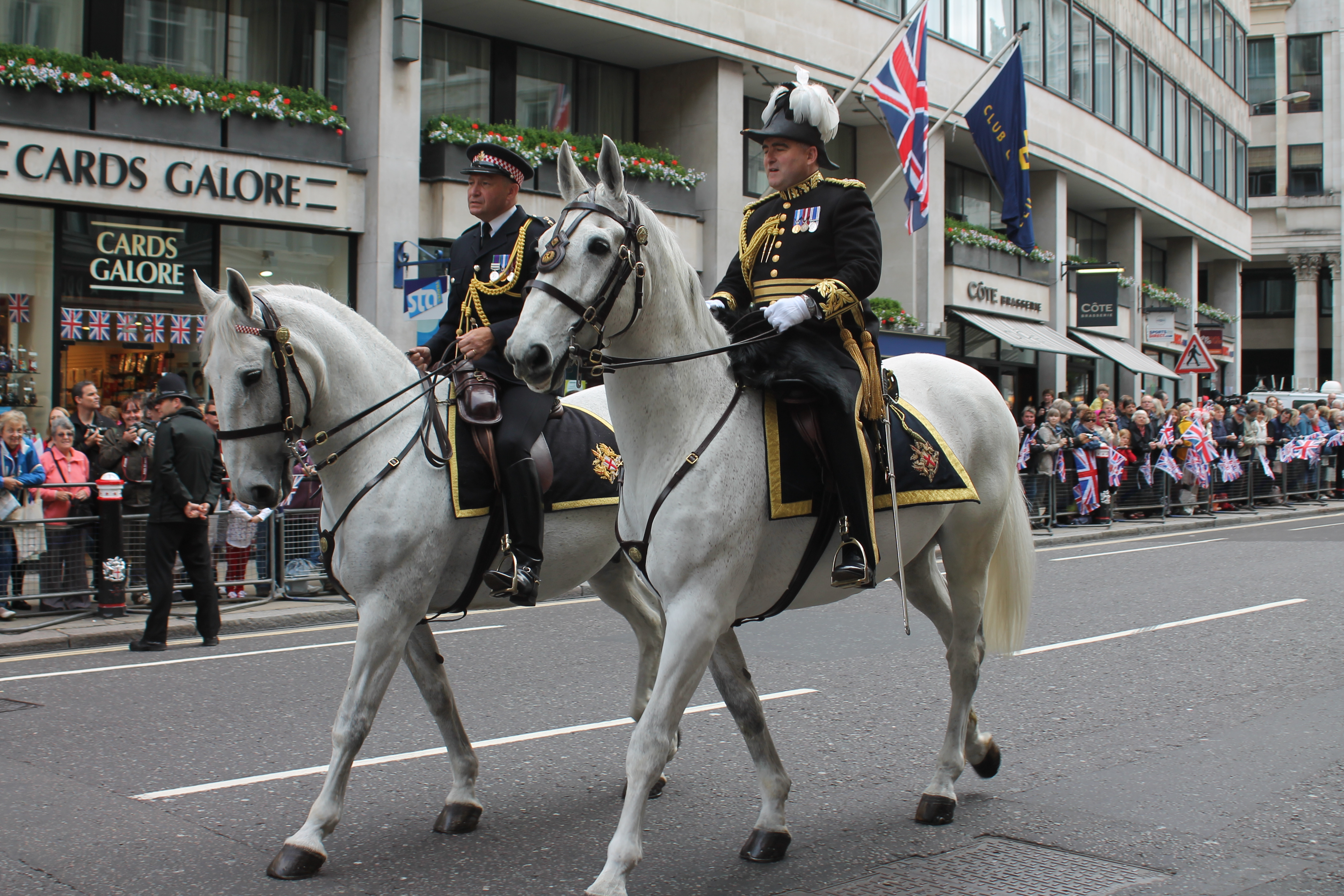
The Assistant Commissioner of the City of London Police in full ceremonial uniform, 2012.

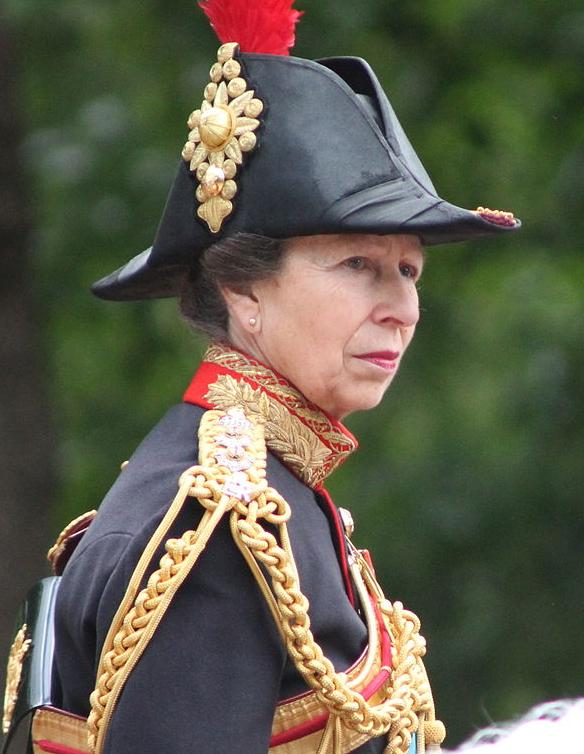
Anne, Princess Royal, as Colonel of the Blues and Royals, at the Trooping the Colour in 2013.

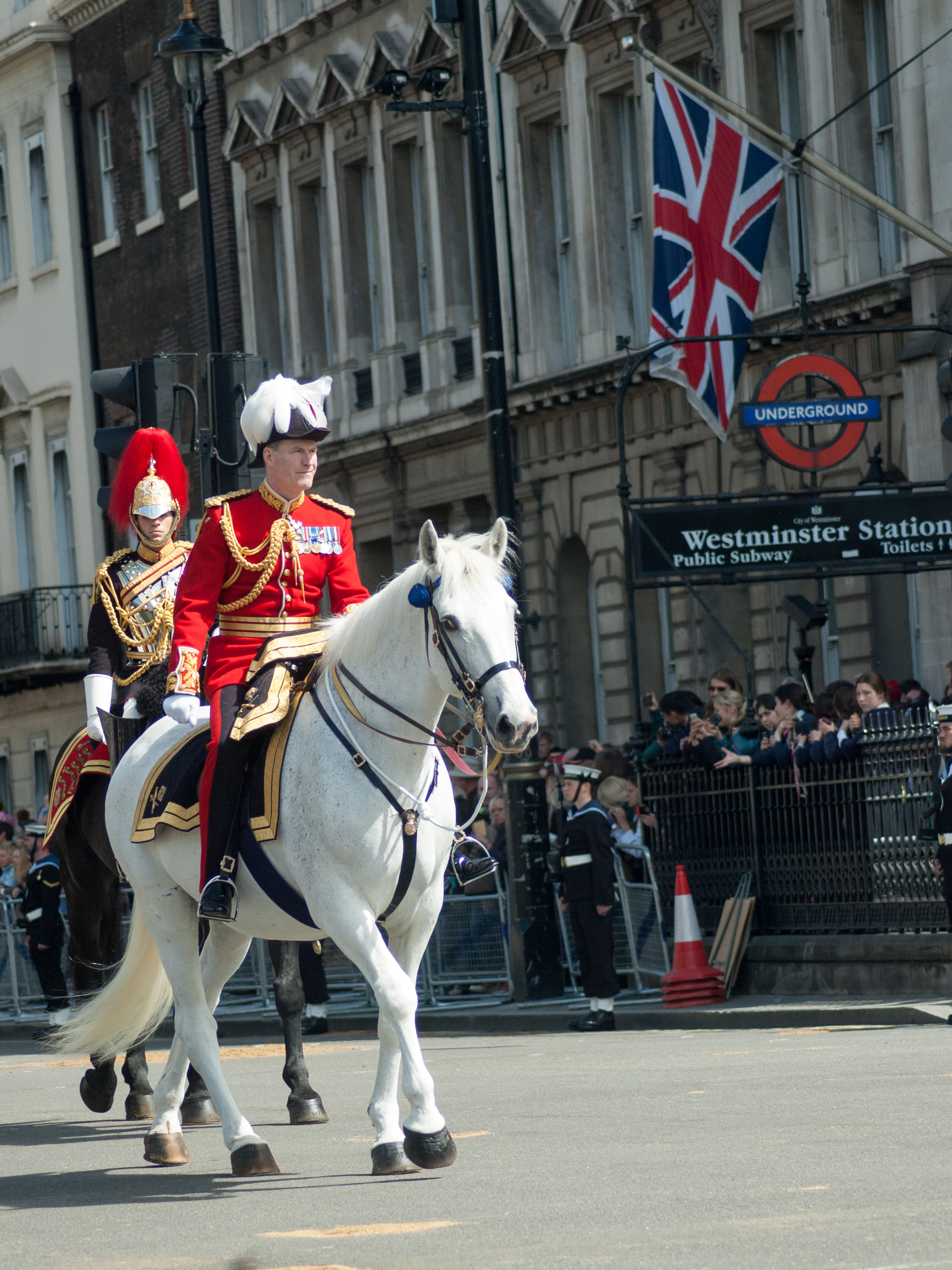
The Major-General commanding the Household Division at the State Opening of Parliament in London, 2015.

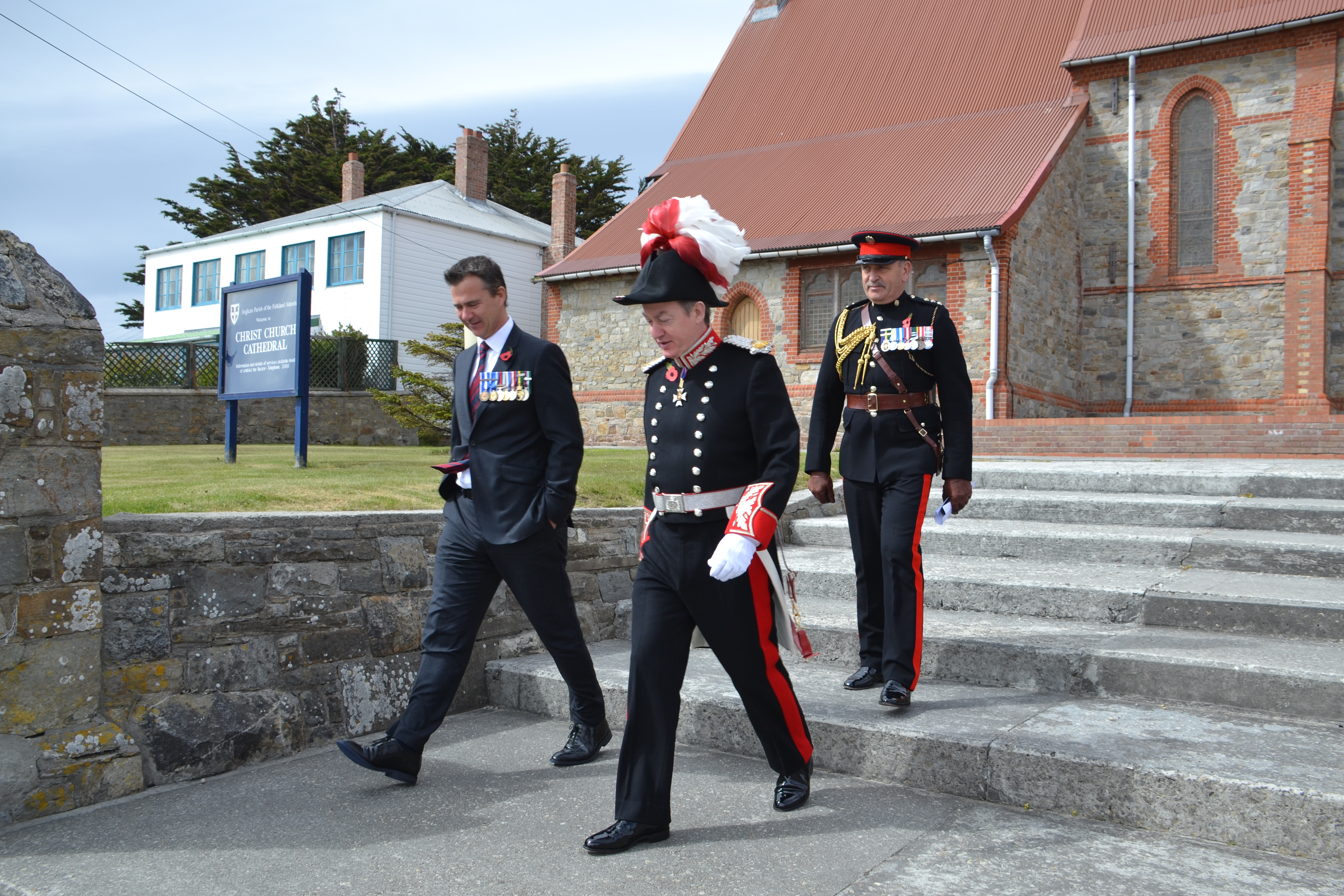
The Governor of the Falkland Islands (centre) in 2016.

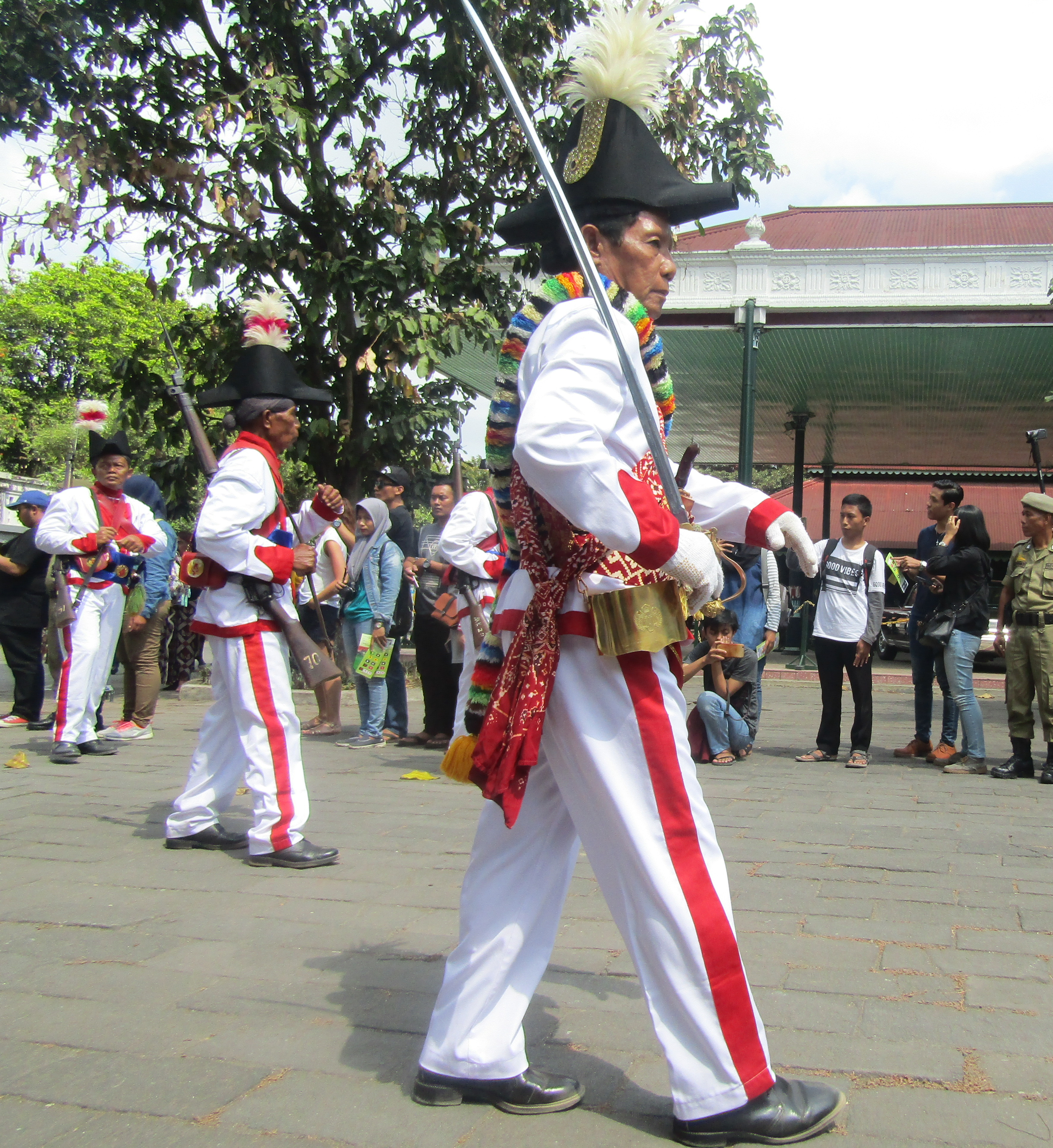
One of the two lurahs of Dhaeng Bregada from Yogyakarta Sultanate (they both held a rank as panji) during a Garebeg ceremony in 2018.

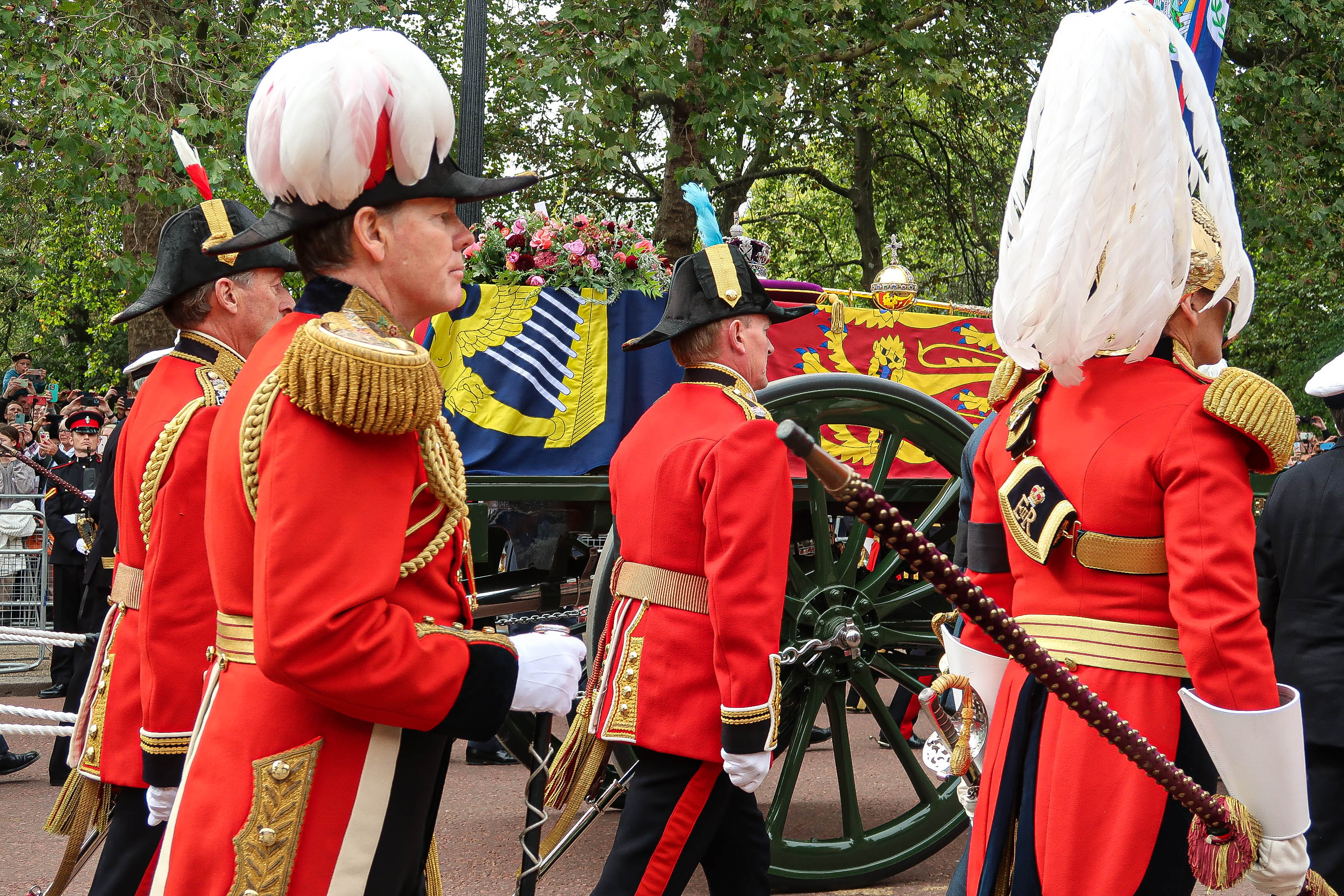
Cocked hats at the State funeral of Elizabeth II: (l-r) an Equerry, an officer of the Yeomen of the Guard and the Quartermaster of the Irish Guards.

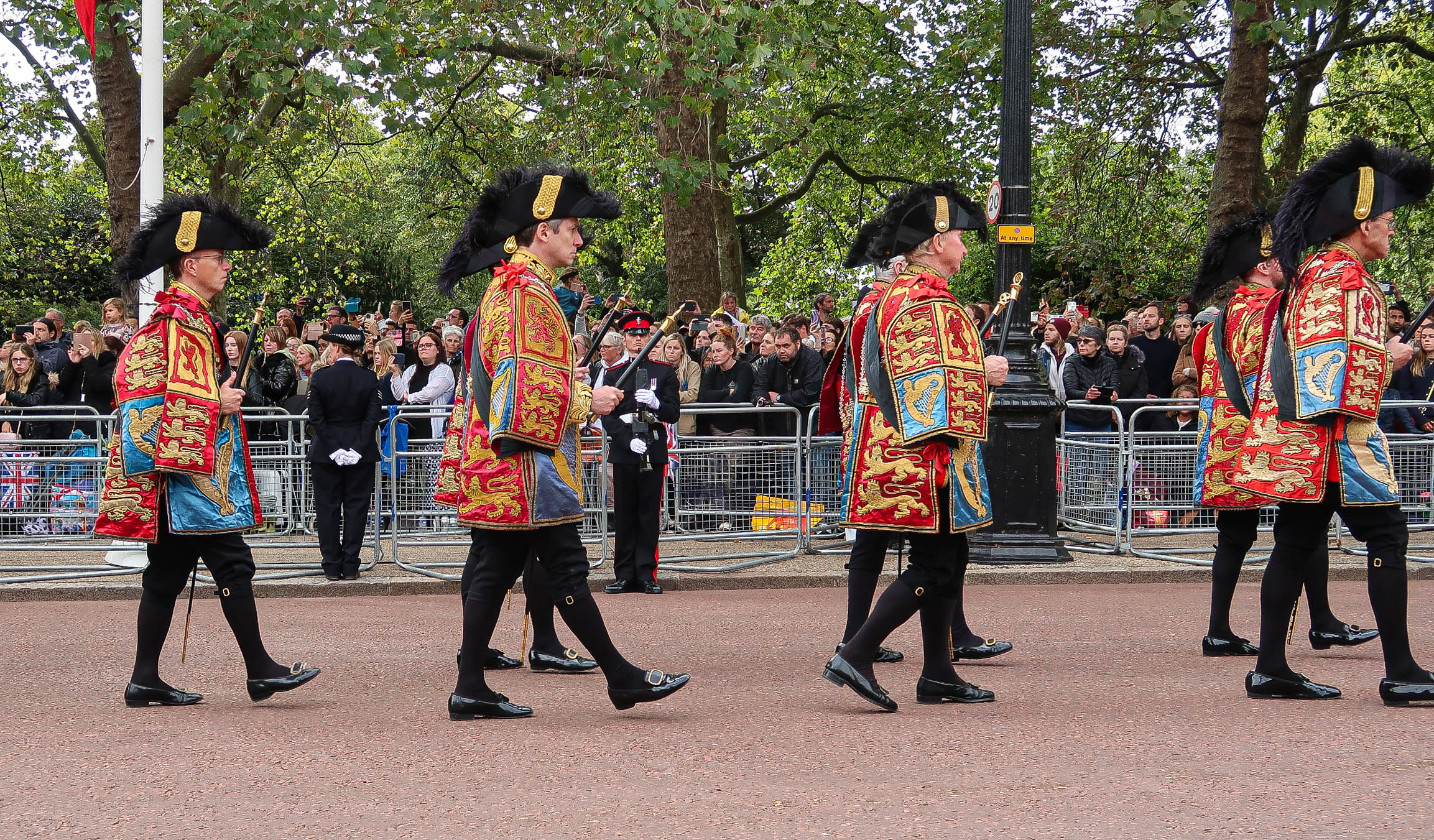
Heralds in the state procession following the funeral of Queen Elizabeth II.

== See also ==
- List of hat styles
- List of headgear
- Le Bicorne
- Cap
- Headgear of the United States Army
