= Kecer =

Unpitched percussion instrument

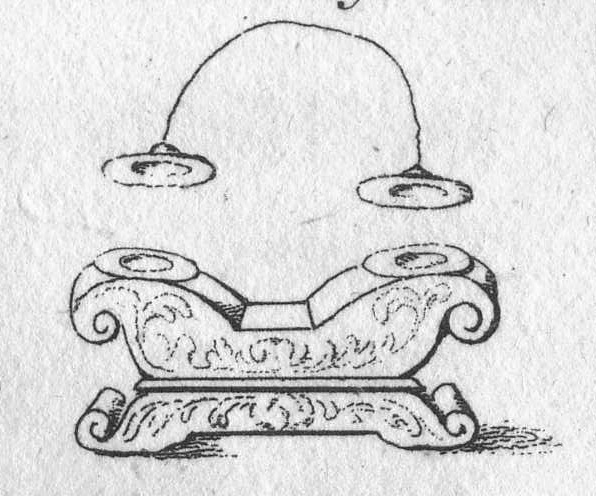
Engraving of a kecer

The kecer (or kecèr) are a pair of small cymbals set inside a rack (rancak) used in the gamelan of Indonesia. The rack is similar in design to that of a saron, except less wide. The bottom cymbals are permanently fixed in the rack, while the top are attached by a cord to the bottom ones. They are used in the accompaniment of wayang.

There are also other forms of the kecer, which are played with mallets, and are used in archaic gamelans.
