= The History of Java =

1817 book by Stamford Raffles

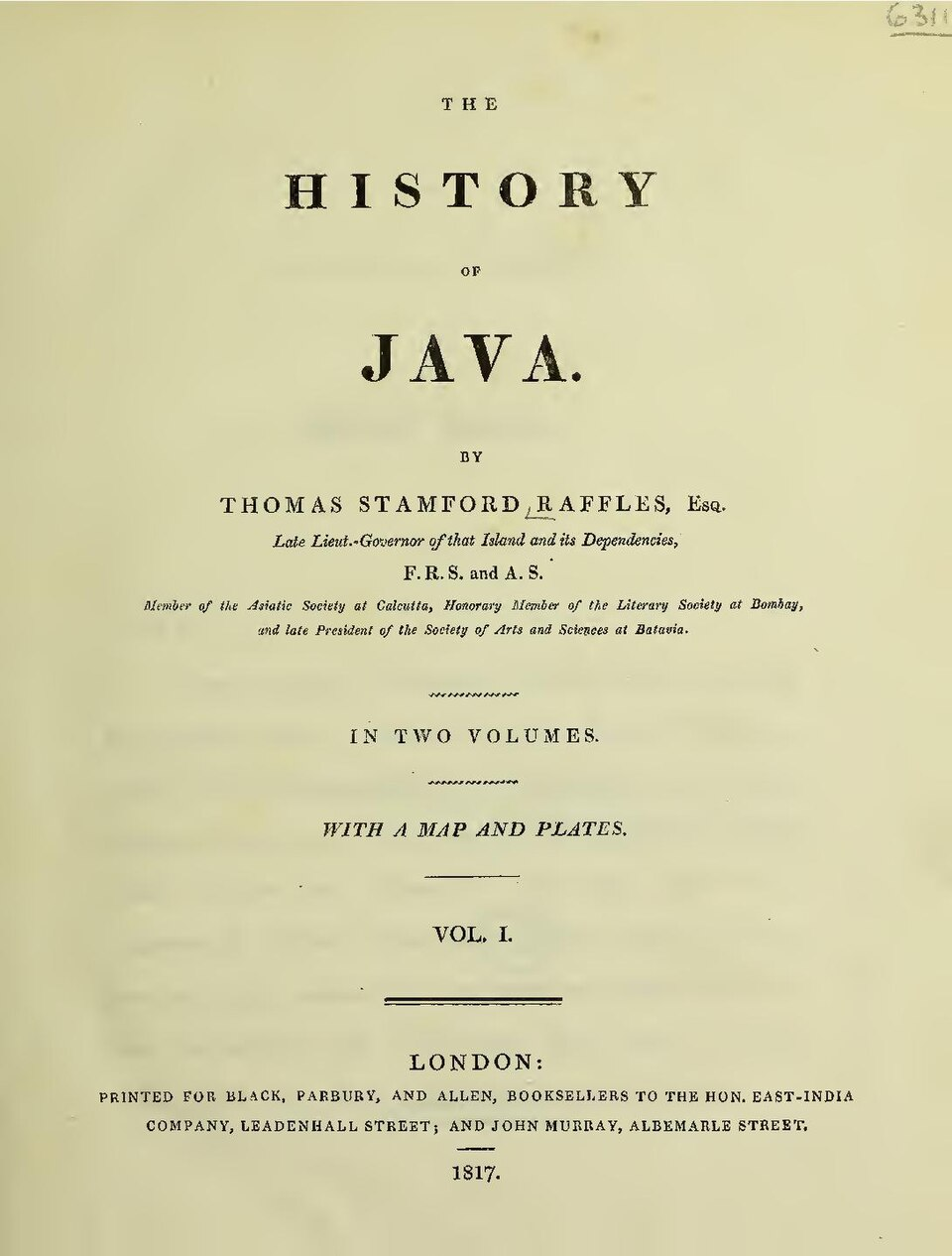
- Title page for The History of Java (1817)
- Author: Thomas Stamford Raffles
- Language: English
- Published: 1817
- Publisher: John Murray
- Publication place: United Kingdom
- Pages: vol. 1: xlviii + 479 vol. 2: cclx + 288
- OCLC: 741754581

The History of Java is a book written by Sir Thomas Stamford Raffles and published in 1817. The first volume describes the physical features of the island and Javanese people and their language, while the second covers the island's religion, ruins and arts, and its history up to 1811. Raffles was the British lieutenant governor of Java from 1811 to 1816 and wrote the book on his return to England.

== Background ==
In 1811 Raffles was appointed as the British lieutenant governor of Java and served until 1816. During his short time in the post, British Java saw a surge of archaeological surveys and government attention on local culture, art and history. Raffles collected over thirty tons of Javanese objects to help him write the book, and shipped the collection to London in 1816. He started the book in October 1816 and published it on 10 April 1817.

Many of the items depicted in the book were looted during the Sack of Yogyakarta, including the heirloom kris of Sultan Hamengkubuwono II. Raffles allegedly ordered the Sultan's kris to be taken.

== Summary ==
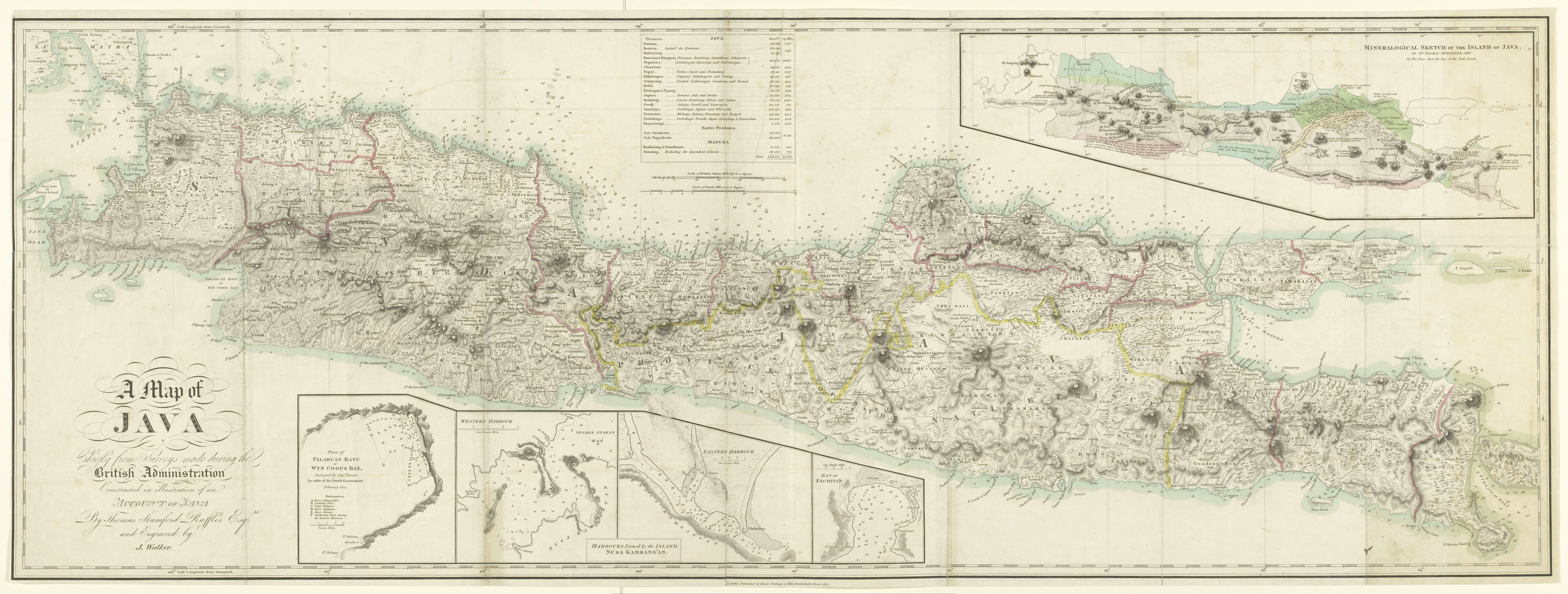
Map of Java included in the book

The History of Java was published in two volumes. The first volume describes the physical features of Java island, as well as the Javanese people and their language. The second volume focuses on the island's religion, ruins and arts, and a record of Java history up to 1811. Appendices take up half of the pages in the second volume. It also include map engraved by John Walker, with smaller maps inset of four harbours, as well as mineralogy map of Java by Thomas Horsfield.

== Publication history ==
The first edition was published in May 1817 and was limited to 900 copies. It contained 66 etched or aquatint plates, 10 of which were hand-coloured by William Daniell. A second edition followed in 1830. Around 1500 copies were printed for the second edition, although it sold less than 500 copies by March 1831.

The book was reprinted by the Oxford University Press in 1965, and in 2010 from a digital master by the Cambridge University Press.

== Reception ==
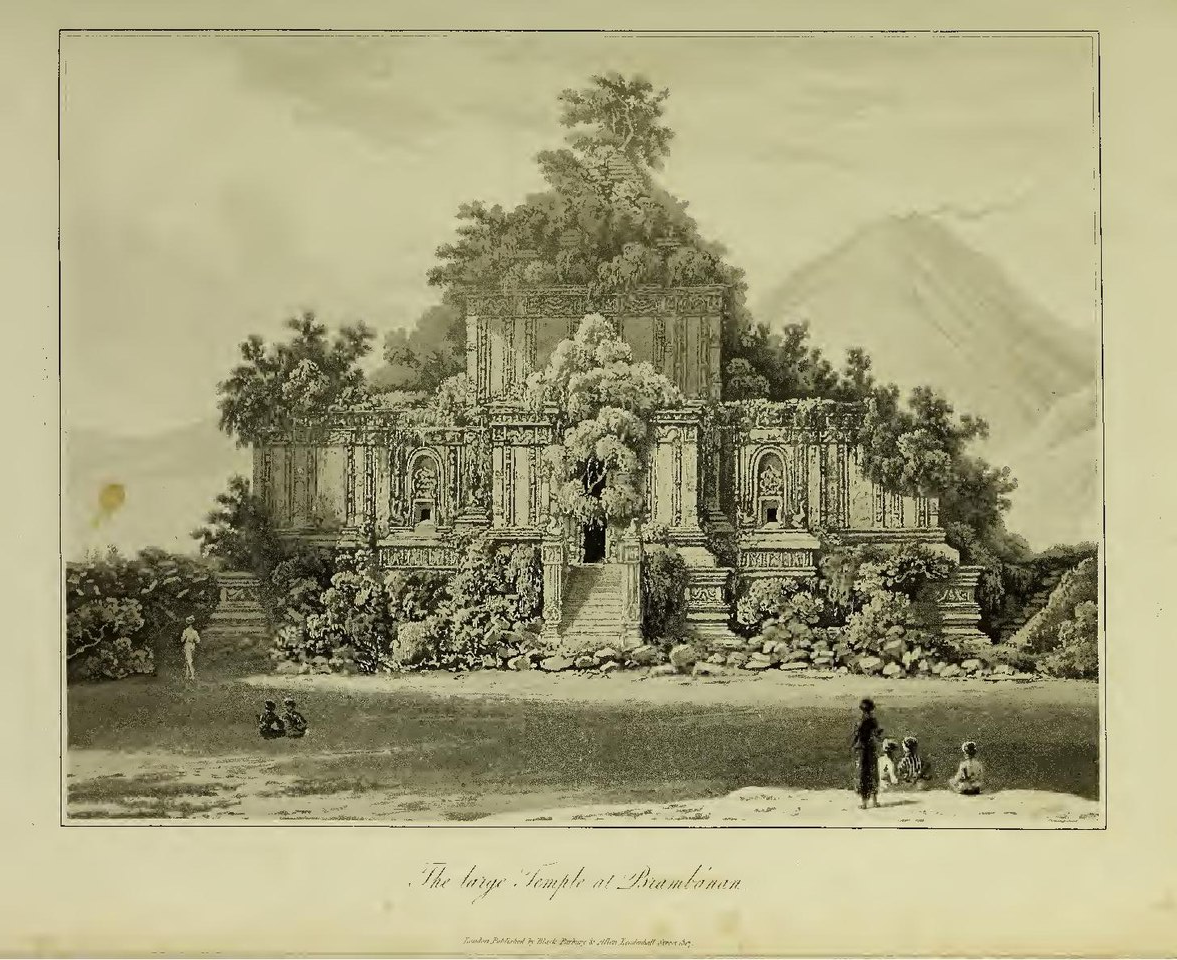
Aquatint of Prambanan from vol. 2 of The History of Java (1817)

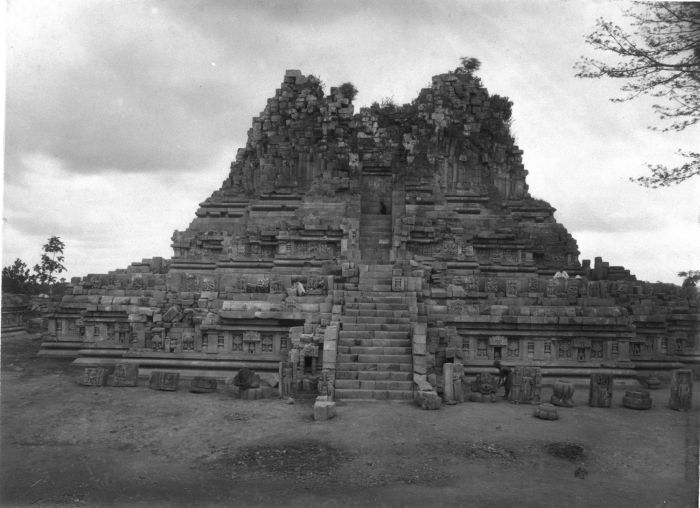
Photograph of Prambanan, circa 1895

In 1817, the Quarterly Review criticized how The History of Java is arranged, saying it "... is not the best, either for perspicuity or compression" and claiming the books could be shorter. They however praised how the Javanese language and its literatures are described in detail.

Charles A. Fisher said the book is a monumental work by Raffles, appreciating the depth of detail and care for culture, which was rare for someone in a colonial position. At the same time he lamented how at that time the British public viewed Raffles' tenure in Java as a failure compared to his role in Singapore.

Sarah Tiffin argued that illustrations of candi in the book followed the picturesque trend of making the ruins more beautiful than they actually were, such as by adding lush vegetation.

== Legacy ==
Between 1 February and 28 April 2019 an exhibition was held in the Asian Civilisations Museum in Singapore featuring many items from Raffles' private collections that were illustrated and discussed in the book. And in May 2019, Tang Holdings donated Raffles' own copy of The History of Java to the National Museum of Singapore.

In 2019 ruins were found in Blitar, East Java. The excavation teams suspect they are the remnants of Candi Gedog, which was mentioned in The History of Java. The confirmation is difficult, as there are only written descriptions of the candi. They suspect that Candi Gedog was mostly intact in Raffles time, but became covered in lahar after the Kelud eruption in 1901.

== Gallery ==
Weapons

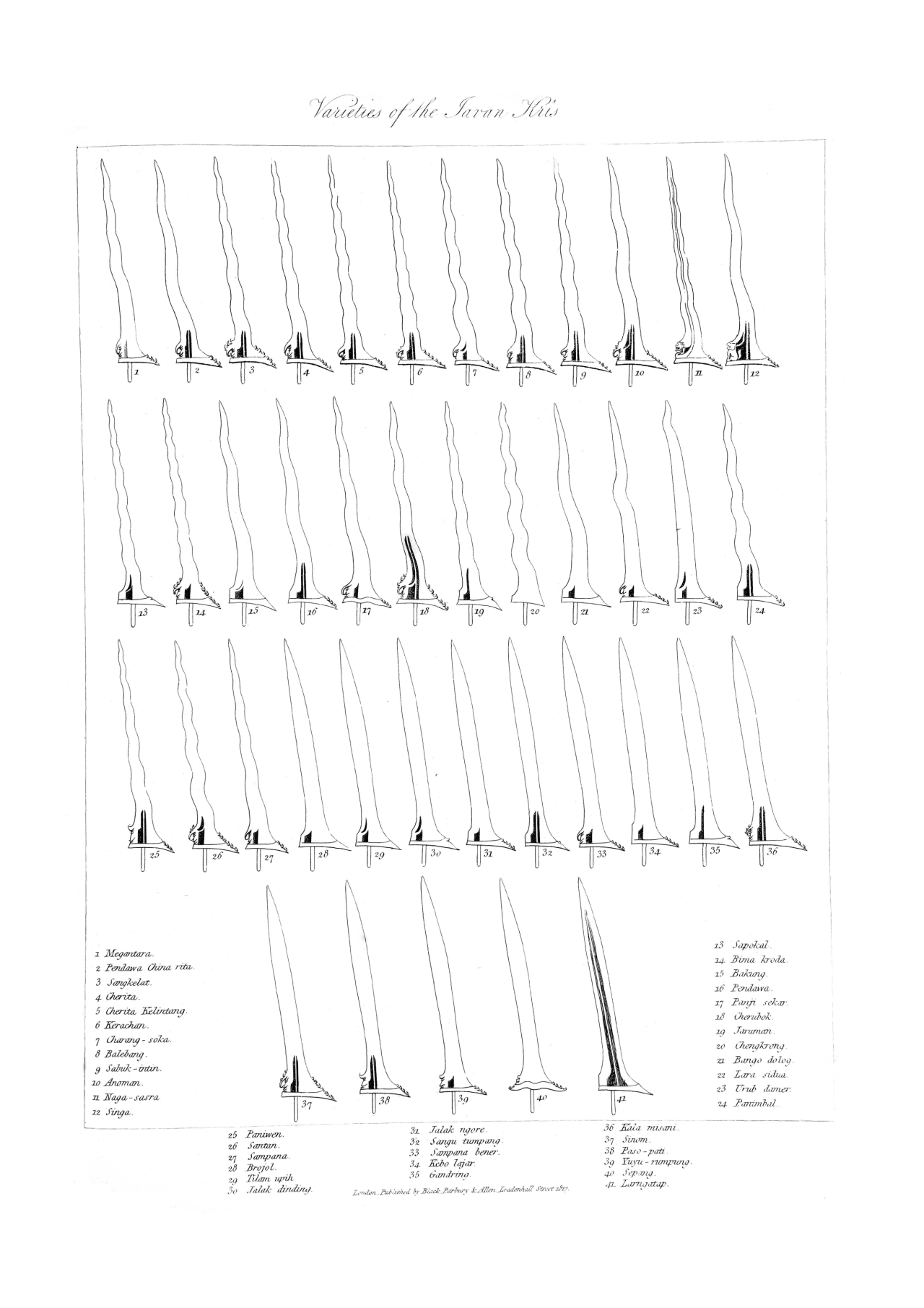
Varieties of Javanese keris

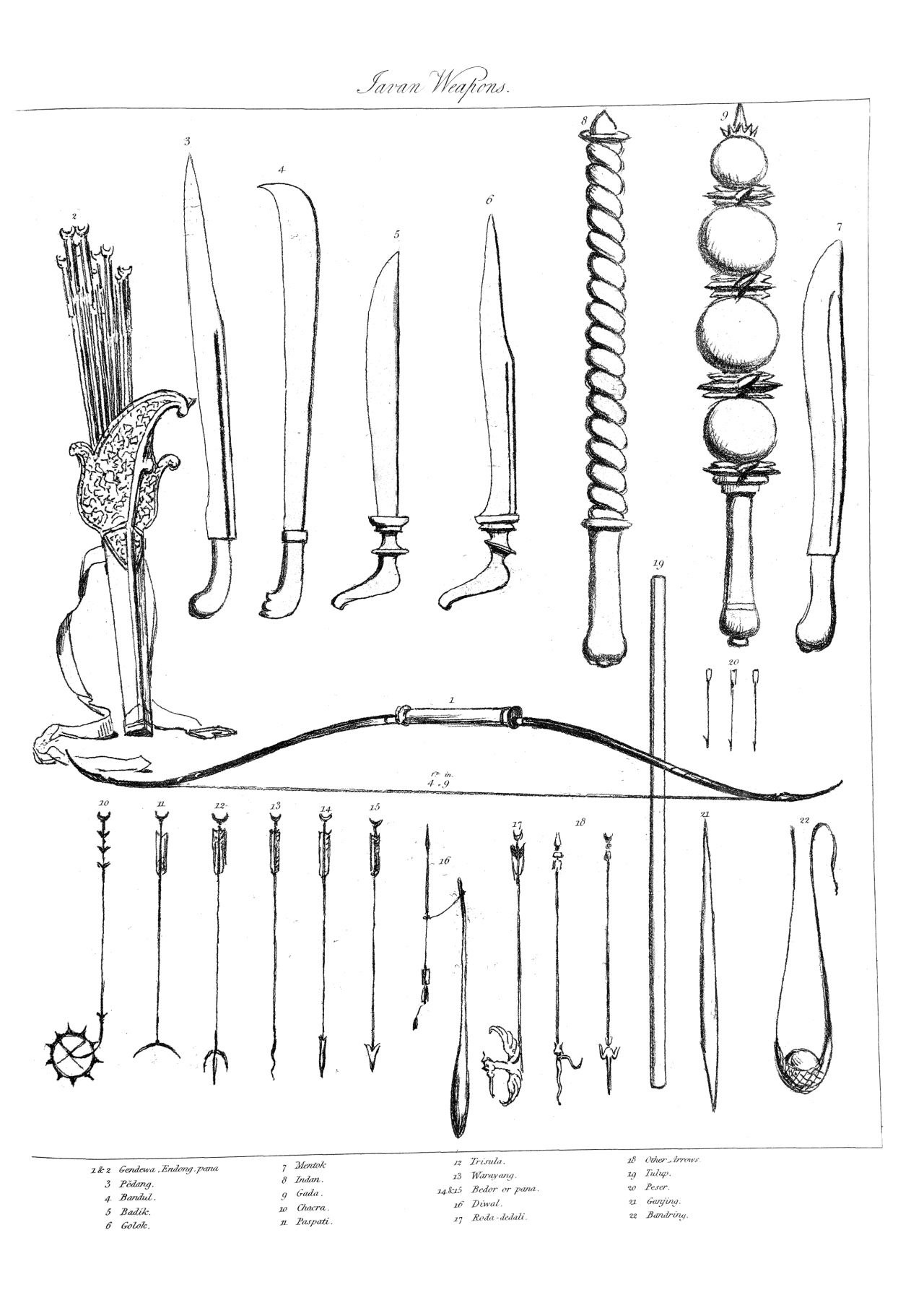
Machetes, maces, bow and arrows, blowpipe, sling

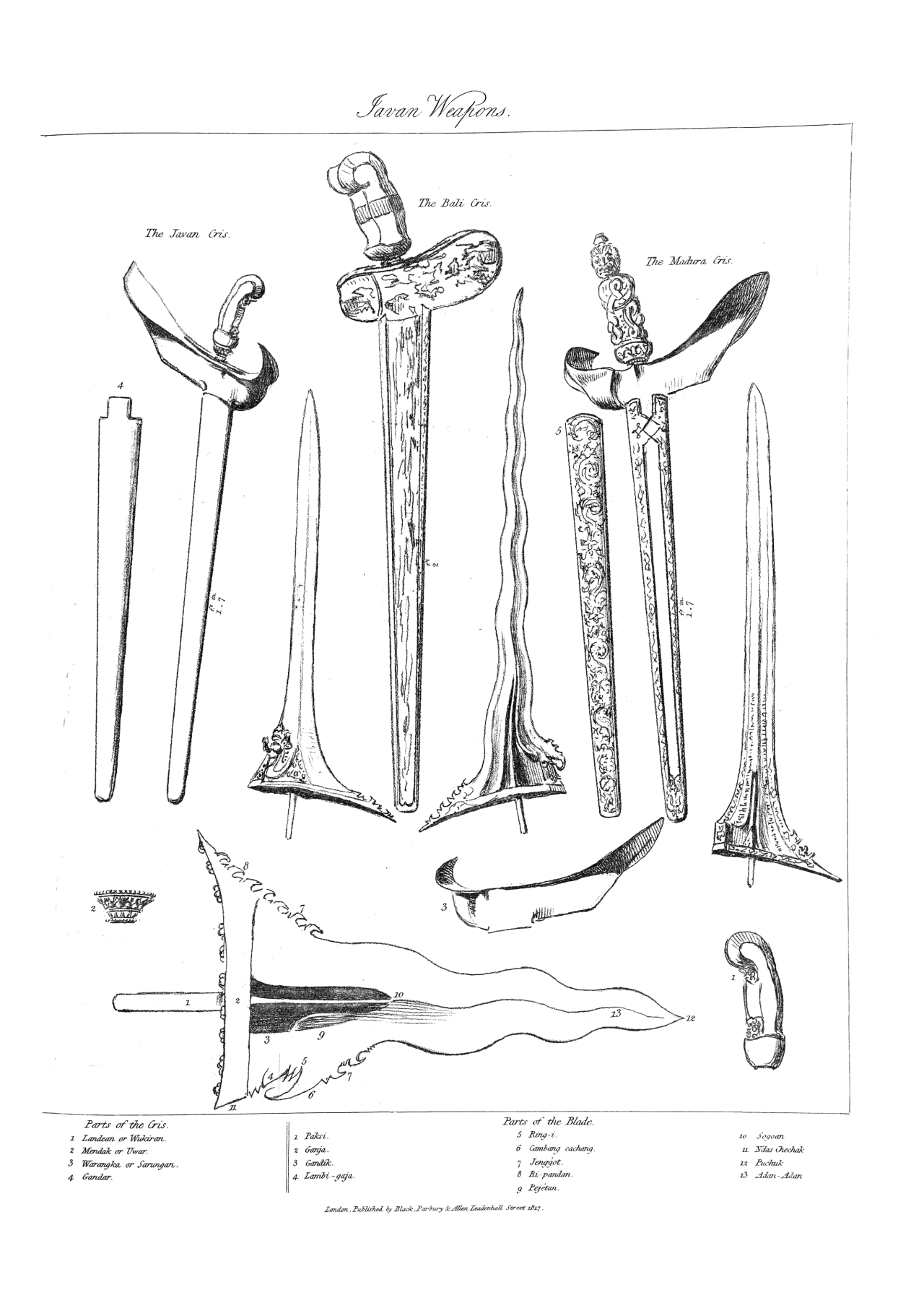
Keris

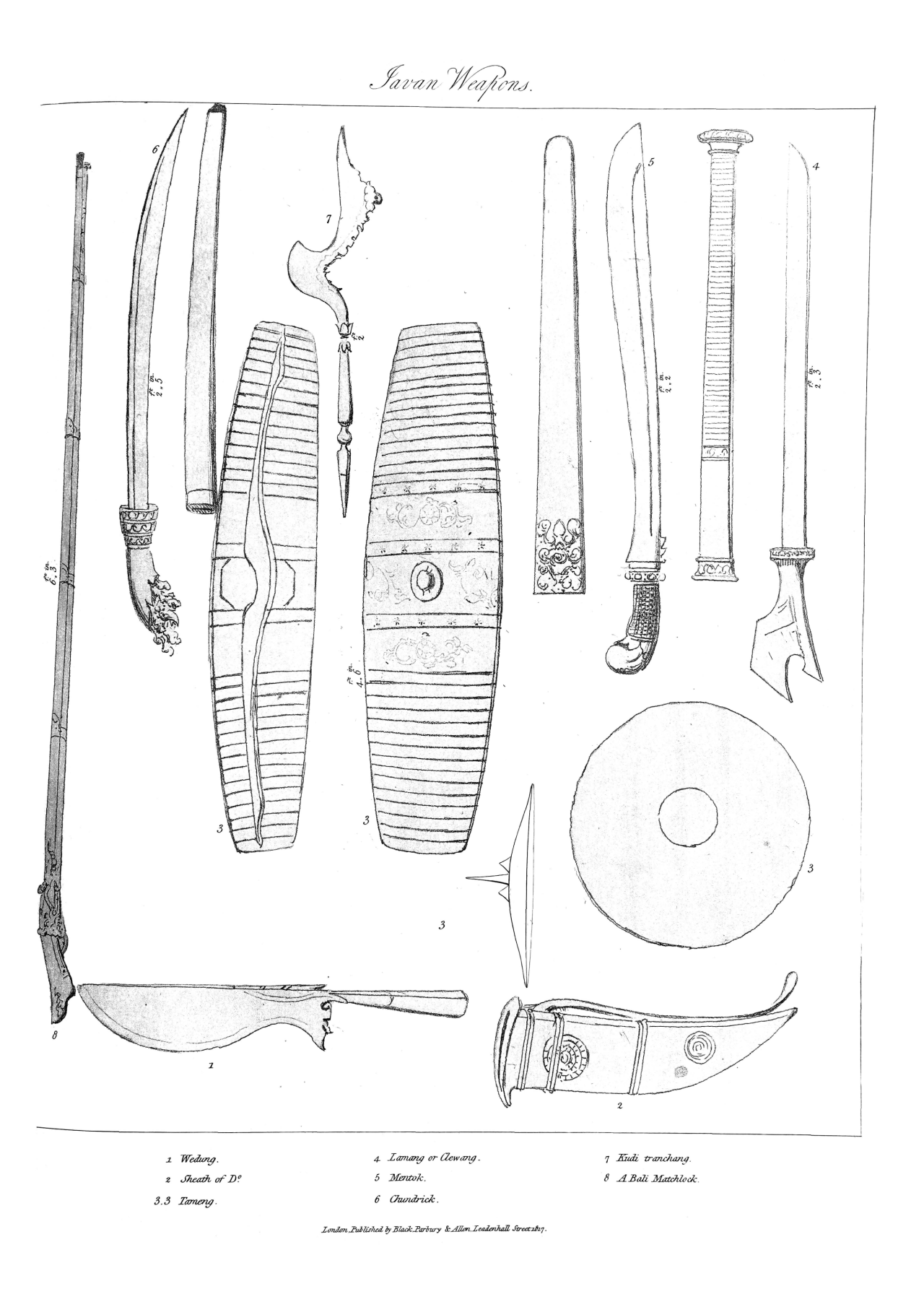
Short swords, shields, and a matchlock gun

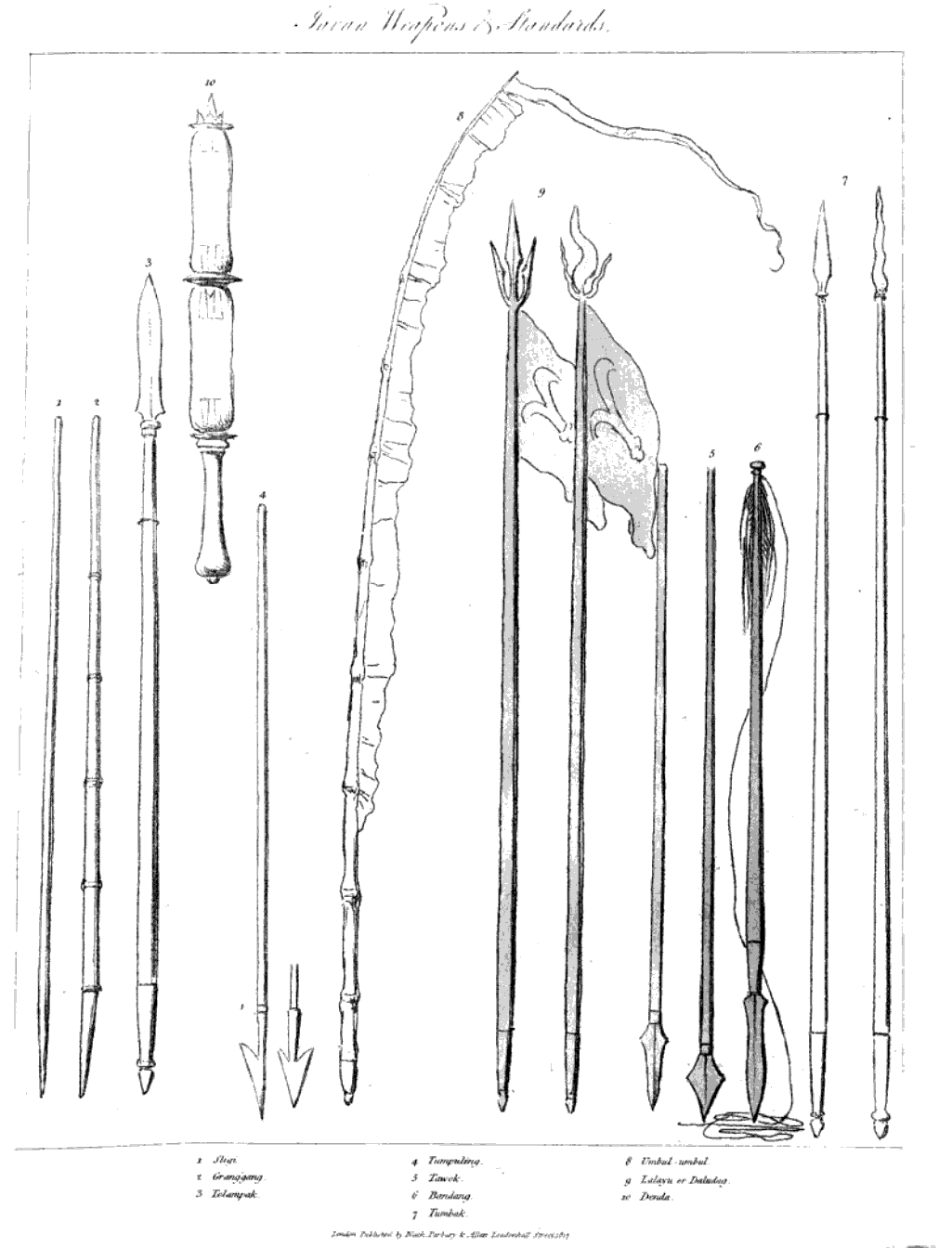
Weapons and standards
Batik

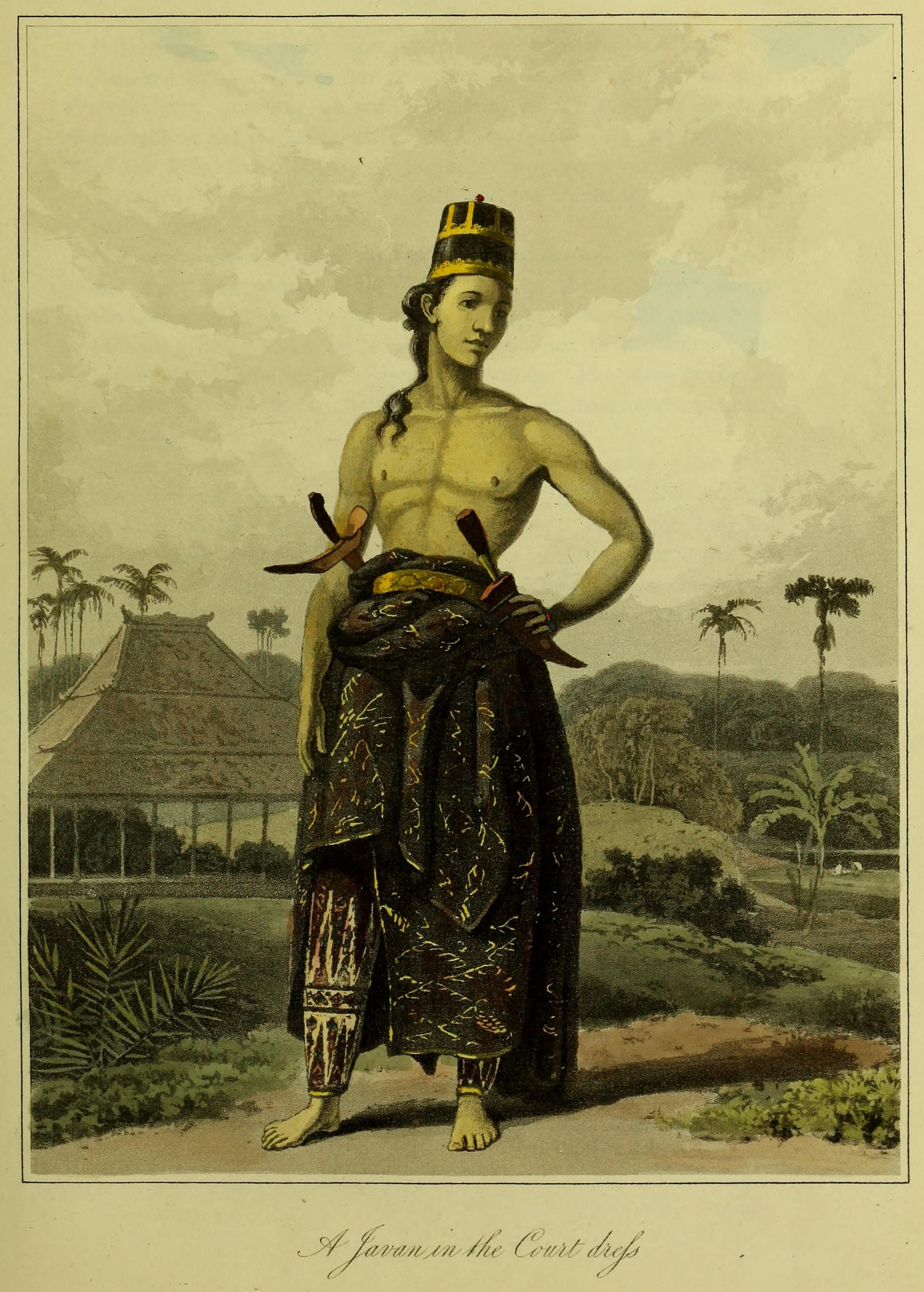
A Javanese man in court dress

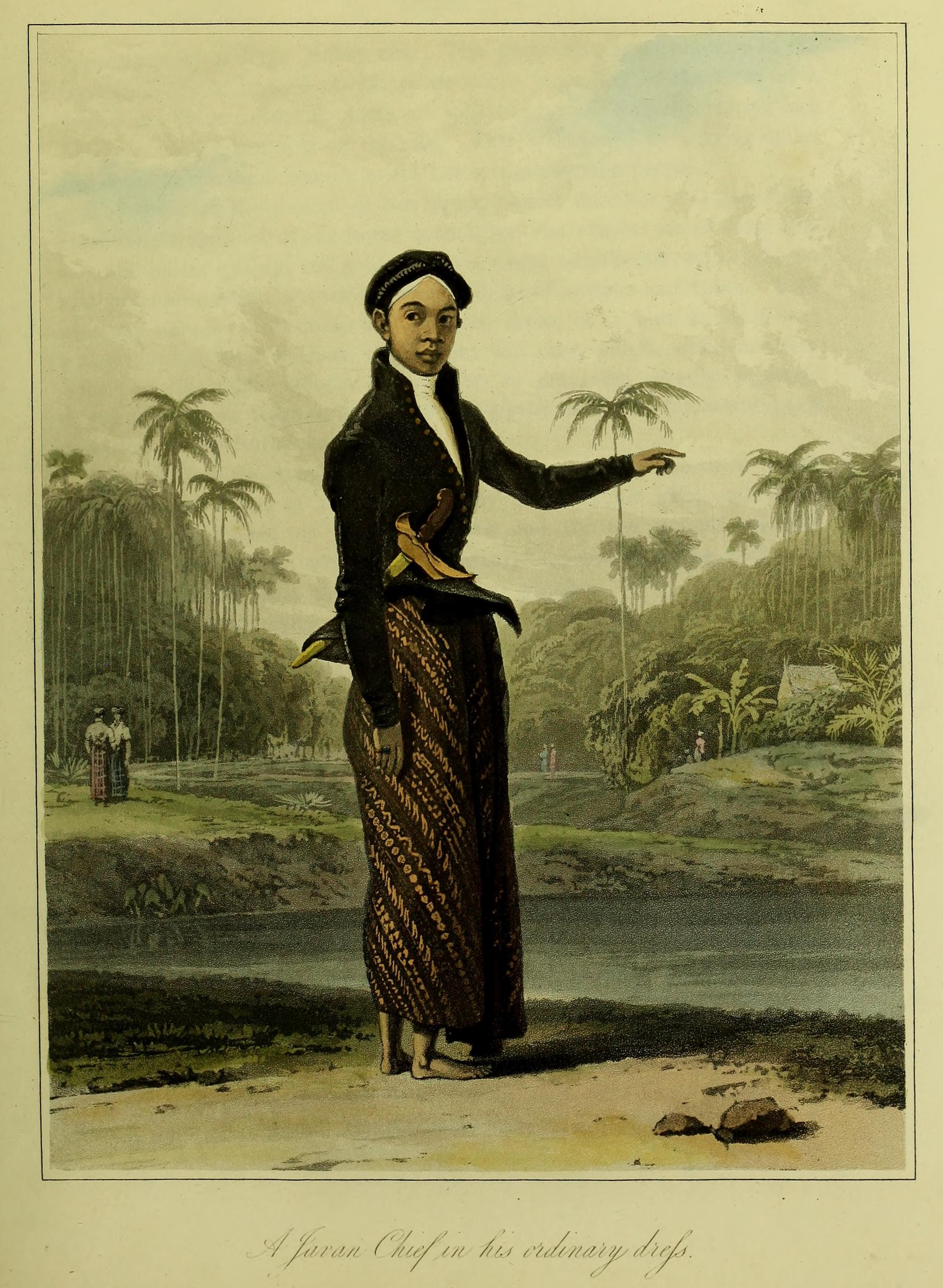
A Javanese chief, in his ordinary dress

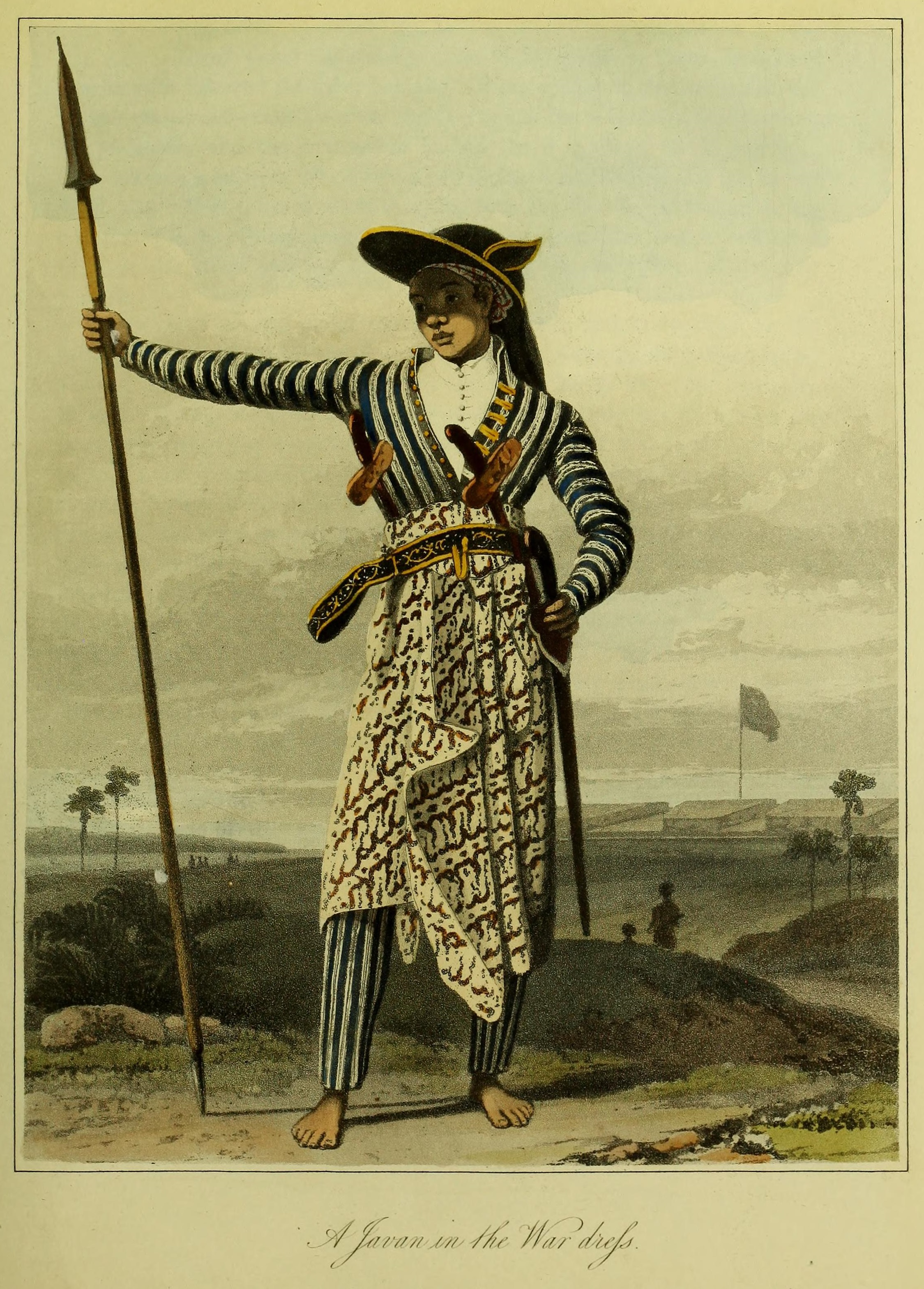
A Javanese man in war dress

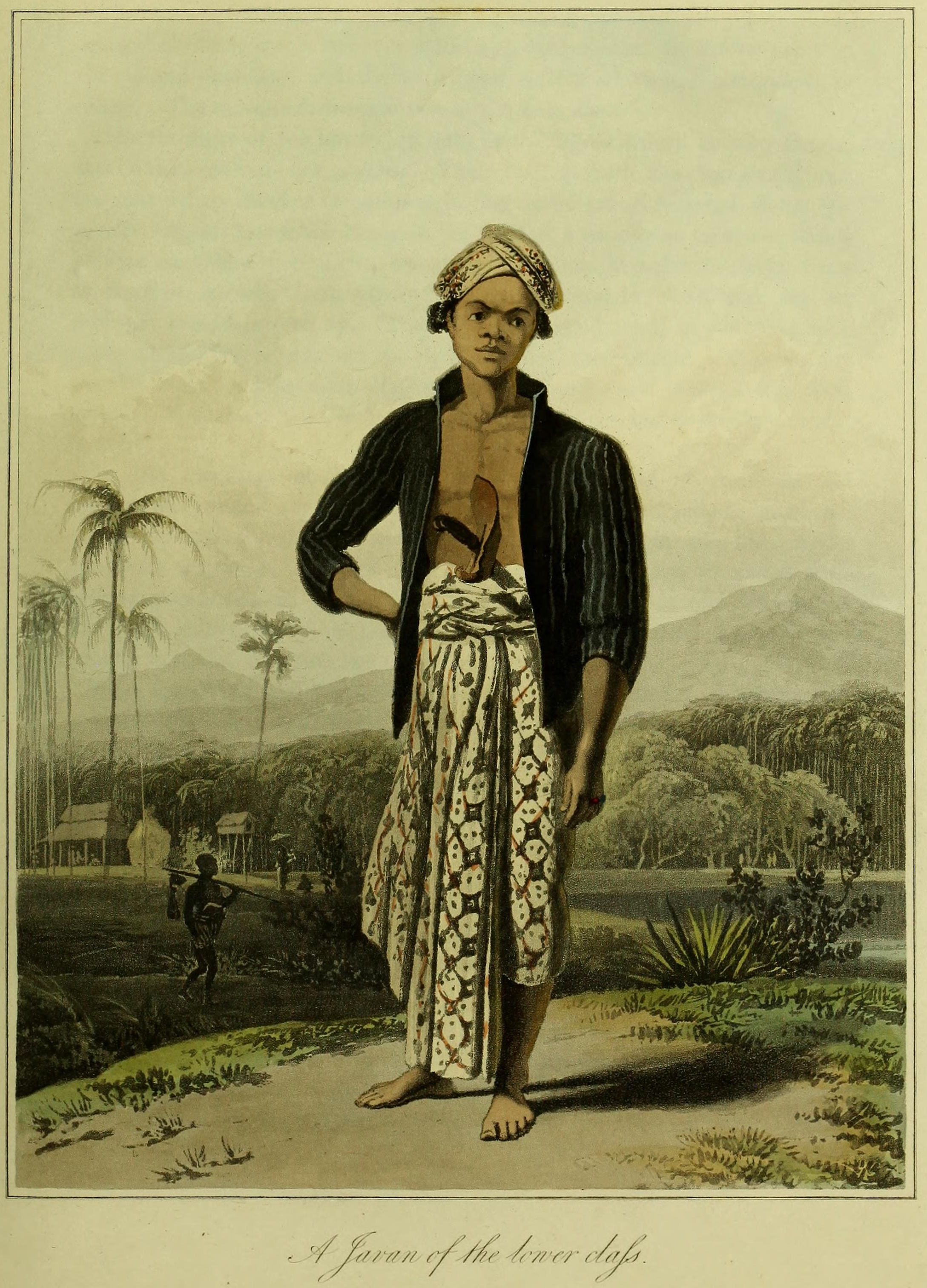
A Javanese man of the lower class

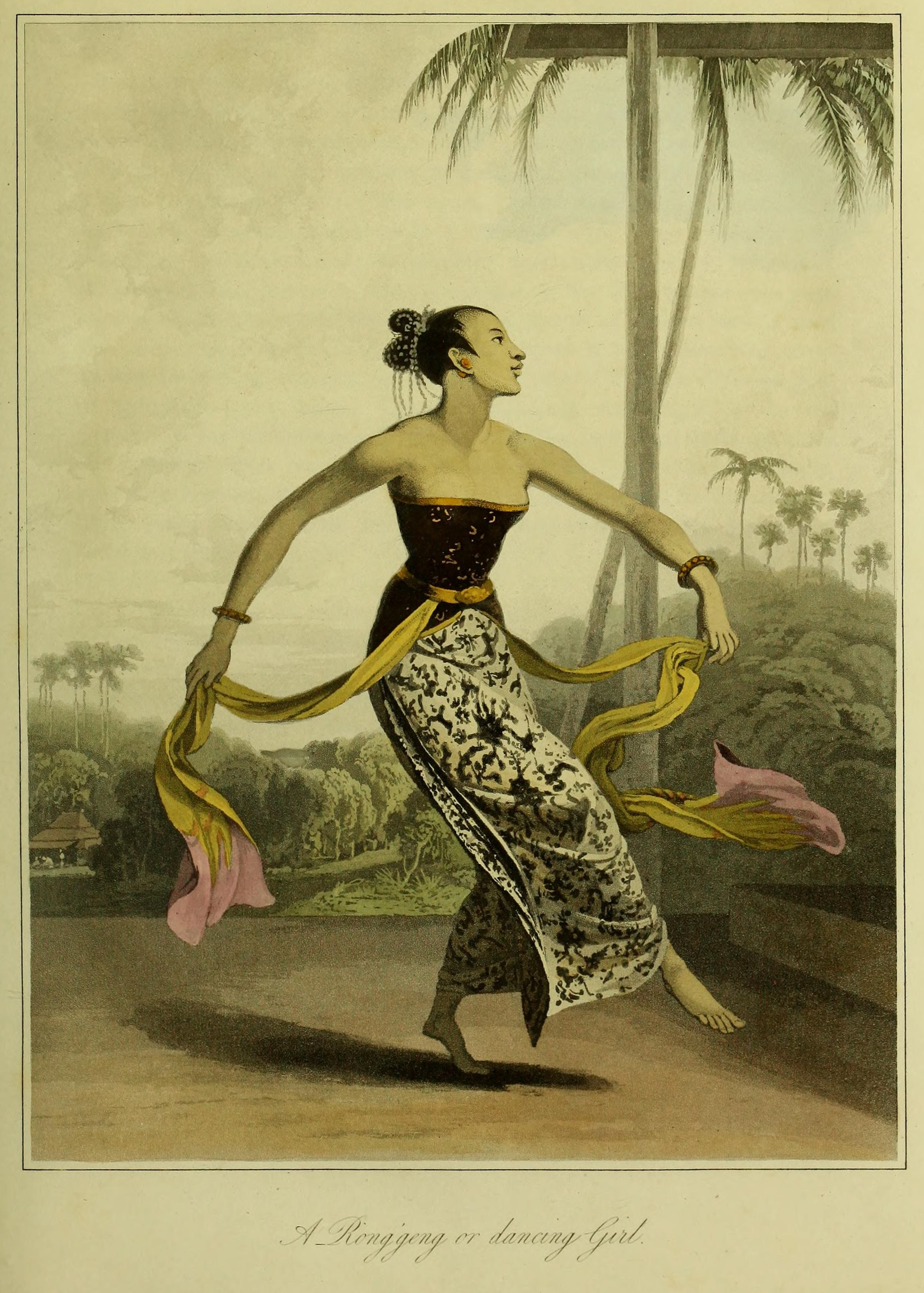
A Javanese ronggeng dancer

== See also ==
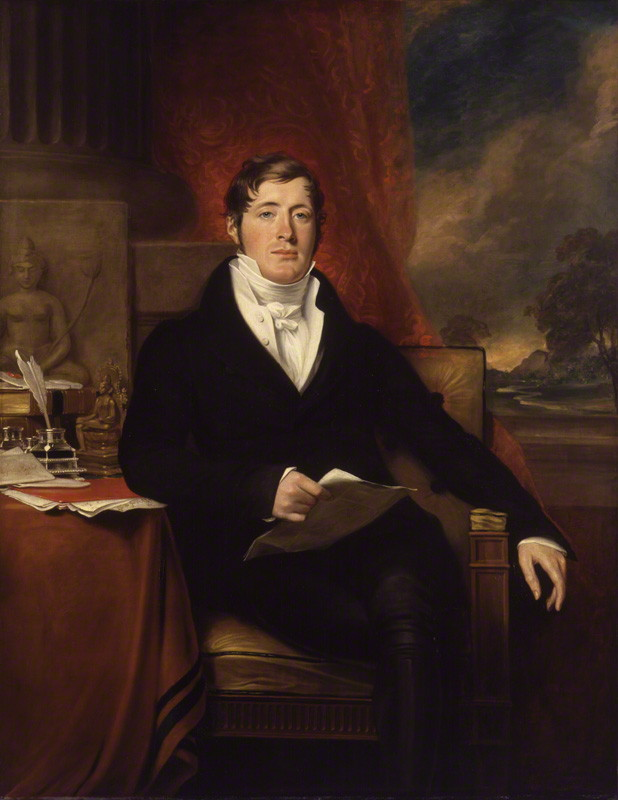
Portrait of Stamford Raffles by George Francis Joseph, 1817. Raffles sat for the painting while in London to oversee publication of the book.

- Max Havelaar, 1860 novel by Multatuli about colonialism in Dutch East Indies.
