= Hamengkubuwono III =

Sultan of Yogyakarta from 1812 to 1814

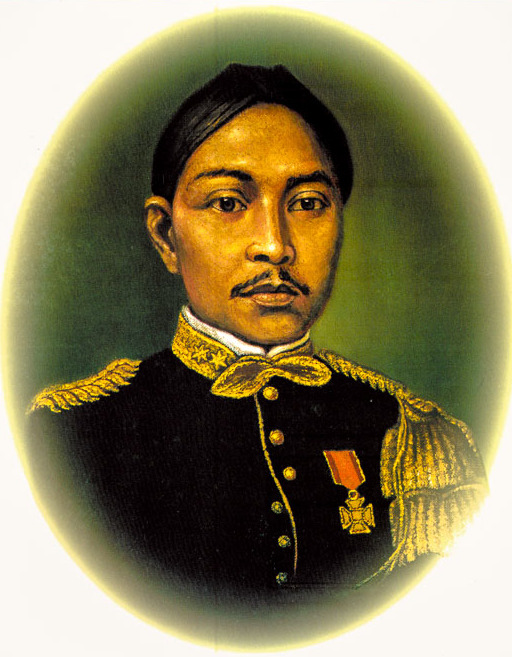

Sultan of Yogyakarta
- Reign: 21 June 1812 – 3 November 1814
- Predecessor: Hamengkubuwono II
- Successor: Hamengkubuwono IV

Prince Regent of Yogyakarta
- Reign: 31 December 1810 – 28 December 1811
- Predecessor: Hamengkubuwono II
- Successor: Hamengkubuwono II
- Born: Raden Mas Surojo; 20 February 1769; Yogyakarta Sultanate
- Died: 3 November 1814 (aged 45); Yogyakarta Keraton
- Spouses: Gusti Kanjeng Ratu Kencana; Gusti Kanjeng Ratu Hemas; Gusti Kanjeng Ratu Wandhan (m. 1805)
- Issue: Bendara Pangeran Harya Diponegoro; Hamengkubuwana IV
- Father: Hamengkubuwana II
- Mother: Gusti Kanjeng Ratu Kedhaton

Hamengkubuwono III (also spelled Hamengkubuwana III, born Raden Mas Surojo; 20 February 1769 – 3 November 1814) was the third sultan of Yogyakarta, reigning from 1810 to 1811 as prince regent and as Sultan from 1812 to 1814. His reign took place during the interregnum of Dutch rule during the Napoleonic Wars, twice replacing his father Hamengkubuwono II.

As Hamengkubuwono II's eldest son, Surojo became crown prince in 1790, prior to his father's succession, due to the intervention of Hamengkubuwono I. A faction emerged in Yogyakarta opposing his succession, which had gained the upper hand by 1808. Following an 1810 rebellion by a Yogyakartan noble, however, Hamengkubuwono II was forced to concede his rulership to Surojo by Herman Willem Daendels. After the British invaded Java, Hamengkubuwono II returned to power and purged Surojo's supporters, until he was again deposed and exiled in 1812.

Surojo formally became Sultan Hamengkubuwono III in June 1812. His reign as sultan saw a reduction in Yogyakarta's military forces and territories by a treaty with the British. He lightened taxation and labour demands on the sultanate's population, which had been imposed by his father for ambitious projects. He died at the age of 45 in November 1814, and was succeeded by his ten-year old son Hamengkubuwono IV.

== Early life ==
Hamengkubuwono III was born Raden Mas Surojo on 20 February 1769 at the Yogyakarta Keraton, where he spent his childhood. His father was Hamengkubuwono II (at the time of his birth, crown prince with the birth name of Raden Mas Sundoro), and his mother was Raden Ajeng Gambariyah (later titled Gusti Kanjeng Ratu Kedhaton/Queen). Surojo was Sundoro's eldest son. In his youth, Surojo became known as an amateur historian and a writer, and according to Dutch accounts, Surojo's grandfather Hamengkubuwono I took a liking to Surojo, personally educating him including on Javanese history and tales.

In 1790, as his grandfather was dying, rumours spread that the Sultanate would be partitioned between Surakarta and the Mangkunegaran after his death. In response, Hamengkubuwono I ordered that Surojo be designated crown prince, (Note: Full title: Raja Putra Naréndra Pangéran Adipati Anom Amangkunagara.) even as Sundoro was also still crown prince. Sundoro preferred to select another of his sons as crown prince, but deferred to his father. Hamengkubuwono I died on 24 March 1792, and Sundoro succeeded him as Sultan Hamengkubuwono II.

== As crown prince ==
Two factions emerged in Yogyakarta's court: one supporting Surojo's status as crown prince, while another supported Prince Mangkudiningrat, another son of Hamengkubuwono II. As the Netherlands fell under French rule as the Kingdom of Holland, Herman Willem Daendels was installed in January 1808 as the new Governor-General of the Dutch East Indies. By the time of Daendels, the crown prince's faction in court had become rather weak, with Surojo often being uninvited to state functions. While not outwardly resisting, during this period he had hired a kyai to poison his father.

Surojo led a military review to Dutch officials in June 1808, and according to Dutch accounts, attempted to show his Dutch guests that he held a pro-Dutch sentiment. At the time, however, anti-Dutch sentiment was growing in Yogyakarta's court as Daendels harshly tightened Dutch influence on the Sultanate. By November 1810, an anti-Dutch rebellion led by Yogyakartan noble Rongga Prawiradirdja had broken out. During the rebellion, the Dutch coerced Hamengkubuwono II to hand over the overall Yogyakartan military command to Surojo.

After the rebellion was suppressed, Daendels marched into Yogyakarta with a force of 3,200 soldiers, and demanded that Surojo be installed as Yogyakarta's ruler. Hamengkubuwono II acquiesced, and on 31 December 1810 Surojo became Prince Regent, retaining his title of crown prince. Hamengkubuwono II remained at the Keraton, and continued to control state finances and the royal demesne. In August 1811, however, the British invaded Java, deposing the Franco-Dutch government. Immediately after the Franco-Dutch collapse, Hamengkubuwono II de facto returned to power. Surojo formally abdicated as regent on 28 December 1811, remaining as crown prince. A key supporter of Surojo's, patih Danureja II, was executed at the Keraton in late October, and several more officials supporting him were executed in his father's 1811–1812 reign.

== Sultan ==
By early 1812, Hamengkubuwono II was making plans against both the British and Surojo. Learning of the plans, the new British colonial government under Stamford Raffles began communicating with Surojo. An agreement was reached between Surojo and Raffles that Surojo would become the new Sultan, while his ten-year old son would become crown prince. (Note: Surojo's eldest son, Prince Diponegoro, claimed that he was offered the position of crown prince, but refused.) In June 1812, around 1,000 British troops attacked and sacked the Yogyakarta Keraton, capturing Hamengkubuwono II and his entourage. Surojo formally acceded to the throne as Sultan Hamengkubuwono III on 21 June 1812. On 1 August, Hamengkubuwono III signed a treaty with the British, agreeing to disband most of the sultanate's standing army and cede significant outlying territories of the sultanate, particularly to the east. Territories ceded by Yogyakarta included Jipang (present-day Bojonegoro), Mojokerto, and Grobogan, along with Kedu and Pacitan which were held in condominium with Surakarta. The semi-independent Principality of Pakualaman was also split off from the sultanate.

Hamengkubuwono III's rule saw a period of prosperity in the sultanate, with strict fiscal controls (as the British had looted Yogyakartan treasuries), along with the curbing of the behavior of rural police and tax collectors. Hamengkubuwono III received support from many outlying bupati, as while his father engaged in ambitious building projects and conscripted a considerable amount of corvée labor from the outlying regions, Hamengkubuwono III demanded little. He also reinstated payments for the levying of construction material, which his father had simply taken without compensation. Key advisors of Hamengkubuwono III included his eldest son Diponegoro, and Yogyakarta's Kapitan Cina Tan Jin Sing. During his reign, he was also known to serve European foods (such as bread and butter) while entertaining guests.

On October 1814, Hamengkubuwono III contracted a cold, having been frequently ill in the preceding years. By November, he was bedbound, and he died on 3 November 1814 at the Keraton. He was buried at the Imogiri Royal Cemetery next to his grandfather. Raffles ordered Union Flags in Java to be lowered to half-mast in respect and for each British fort to fire a 45-shot salute (Hamengkubowono III's age at death). His ten-year old son Raden Mas Ibnu Jarot acceded to the throne as Hamengkubuwono IV on 6 November 1814, with a regency council.

== Personal life ==
Hamengkubuwono III had three official wives and over 20 concubines, resulting in 32 children. His first queen consort was his first cousin, Gusti Kanjeng Ratu Kencana, a daughter of Kanjeng Raden Tumenggung Sasradiningrat I (also known as Kanjeng Raden Tumenggung Sasranegara), Regent of Grobogan by his primary wife, Bendara Raden Ayu Sasradiningrat, a daughter of Hamengkubuwana I. She was the mother of his successor, Hamengkubuwana IV, and as queen dowager, she was later styled as Gusti Kanjeng Ratu Hageng. The second and third were childless: Gusti Kanjeng Ratu Hemas, daughter of Raden Rangga Prawiradirja I of Madiun, and Gusti Kanjeng Ratu Wandhan.

Diponegoro, his eldest son, was from a concubine, Raden Ayu Mangkarawati.

== Family ==
Royal consorts

- Gusti Kanjeng Ratu Kencana, first cousin of the Sultan. She was a granddaughter of Hamengkubuwana I, later the Gusti Kanjeng Ratu Hageng (Queen Dowager).
  - Gusti Raden Mas Ibnu Jarot (1804 - 1823), appointed as the Kanjeng Gusti Pangeran Adipati Anom (Crown Prince) of Yogyakarta, succeeded as Hamengkubuwana IV
- Gusti Kanjeng Ratu Hemas
- Gusti Kanjeng Ratu Wandhan

Concubines

- Raden Ayu Mangkarawati
  - Bendara Raden Mas Mustahar (1785 - 1855), changed to Bendara Raden Mas Antawirya, titled Bendara Pangeran Harya Diponegoro
- Raden Ayu Dayapurnama
  - Bendara Pangeran Harya Hadisurya
- Raden Ayu Lesmanawati
  - Raden Ayu Prabuningrat
- Raden Ayu Murtiningrum
  - Raden Ayu Sasradipura
- Raden Ayu Surtikawati
  - Raden Ayu Danudiningrat
    - Married Kanjeng Raden Tumenggung Danudiningrat
- Raden Ayu Sasmitalangen
  - Bendara Pangeran Harya Hadinegara or Bendara Pangeran Harya Suryaning Ngalaga

== See also ==
- Hamengkubuwono

Regnal titles
Preceded by Hamengkubuwono II	Sultan of Yogyakarta; 1812–1814	Succeeded by Hamengkubuwono IV
Preceded by Hamengkubuwono II	Regent of Yogyakarta; 1810–1811	Succeeded by Hamengkubuwono II
