= Tan Jin Sing =

Javanese noble (1760–1831)

- 陈仁性

Bupati of Yogyakarta
- In office 1813–1831

Kapitan Cina of Yogyakarta
- In office 27 September 1803 – 6 December 1813
- Preceded by: Oei Tek Liong
- Succeeded by: Qué Wi Kong

Kapitan Cina of Kedhu
- In office 1793–1803
- Preceded by: Oei Tek Liong

Personal details
- Born: 1760
- Died: 10 May 1831 (aged 70–71)

Tan Jin Sing (Chinese: 陈仁性; 1760 – 10 May 1831), titled Raden Tumenggung Secadiningrat, was a bureaucrat of the Yogyakarta Sultanate. He was Kapitan Cina for Kedhu and later Yogyakarta, before his actions in support of Hamengkubuwono III resulted in his elevation to the rank of bupati. He was the first Chinese to be appointed to Javanese nobility.

Adopted by a Chinese family as a baby, Tan had become involved as a Kapitan Cina by 1793, and moved to Yogyakarta in 1802. There, he became involved in the politics of the Yogyakarta Sultanate, strongly supporting Dutch and British involvements. In particular, his support for the British after their 1811 invasion of Java and sacking of Yogyakarta resulted in his elevation into Yogyakartan nobility. Despite this, he was estranged from Javanese aristocrats due to his European relationships. He lost much of his fortune following the Java War, and died shortly after its end.

== Early life ==
Tan was born in 1760 with R. A. Patra Wijaya as his mother. His biological father, the district chief (demang) of Kalibeber (in modern Wonosobo Regency), died while he was a baby, and he was adopted by Oei Tek Liong, a relative of his mother. A bhikkhunī noted that there was a mismatch between Tan and Oei, and so he was raised for seven months by Tan Sing Hong, who gave him his name, before returning to Oei Tek Liong's care. Oei Tek Liong would marry Patra Wijaya upon his wife's death. In addition to Mandarin Chinese and Hokkien, Tan learned to speak Javanese, English, and Dutch.

== Career ==
=== Kapitan Cina ===
In 1793, Tan became the Kapitan Cina/Kapitein der Chinezen in the Kedhu area, replacing his adoptive father who became Kapitan in Yogyakarta. He moved to Yogyakarta in 1802 at the request of his sick father-in-law, who wanted him to run his business, and on 27 September 1803 Tan became Yogyakarta's Kapitan. By 1808, during the tenure of governor-general Herman Willem Daendels, Tan had become involved in the court politics of the Yogyakarta Sultanate, guaranteeing debts of Dutch officials to the Sultanate. Daendels levied a wealth tax on Europeans and Chinese residents of Java in 1809 to fund the defense of Java against a British invasion, and Tan was also levied.

Tan supported British efforts after their 1811 invasion, providing advice and becoming an interpreter to Stamford Raffles and John Crawfurd. When the British sacked Yogyakarta's Keraton in 1812, Tan had prepared bamboo scaling ladders in support of the assault (most Yogyakartan Chinese supported the British), and also provided food and supplies to the British sepoy troops. The troops looted the Yogyakarta Keraton, with Tan personally intervening to rescue several Yogyakartan nobles and heirlooms. His involvement in the incident would later inflame anti-Chinese sentiment in the Sultanate. At the night following the sacking, he was attacked by a retainer of a Yogyakartan prince staying in his house, who managed to kill a pro-British noble and another official and stabbed Tan twice before being killed himself.

=== Borobudur ===
During a conversation with Raffles in 1812, Tan noted the presence of an ancient candi which one of his employees, Rachmat, had found in the past. At Raffles' request, Tan went with his employee and a local guide named Paimin, mapping the general location. Paimin provided the site's name: Borobudur. Tan sent the map as part of a report to Raffles, and in November 1813 Raffles requested that the immediate vicinity of the candi be cleared of vegetation. This work was completed by local villagers including Paimin under Tan by January 1814. Dutch archaeologist Hermann Cornelius became involved shortly after, beginning detailed measurements and taking drawings of the candi.

=== As bupati ===
After the sack, the British deposed reigning Sultan Hamengkubuwono II, and his eldest son Surojo acceded as Hamengkubuwono III. Under British pressure, Hamengkubuwono III appointed Tan as a bupati in December 1813 with the title of Raden Tumenggung Secadiningrat. Que Wi Kong, a close family of Tan's, was appointed the new Kapitan in his place. Tan was granted an appanage of 800 households "in perpetuity", citing his services to Hamengkubuwono III and the British. (Note: The grant included a center of weaving, and was valued at 1,000 agricultural households.) Tan would then shave his queue hair and was circumcised, becoming a Muslim.

Despite his appointment and new rank, his close relationship with Europeans made him unacceptable to the inner circle of Yogyakarta's aristocracy. A Yogyakartan saying was that Tan was "no longer a Chinese, not yet a Dutchman, a half-baked Javanese". (Note: In Javanese: "Cino wurung, Londo durung, Jowo tanggung".) During the late 1810s, Tan Jin Sing accompanied Dutch administrator Nahuys van Burgst to Kalimantan, assisting Nahuys with issues related to Chinese miners there. For a time in 1823–1824, Tan hosted Yogyakarta's Dutch Resident, A. H. Smissaert, at his home.

Tan largely did not take sides during Yogyakarta's court disputes in the 1820s, although he did maintain a good relationship with Prince Diponegoro, Hamengkubuwono III's eldest son, providing support for the maintenance of Diponegoro's personal guards. By 1825, Diponegoro had been forced out of court and was preparing to launch a rebellion. Due to Tan's funding of Diponegoro's bodyguard, he was aware of the buildup and sent a warning to Dutch officials in May 1825. The Dutch failed to stop the uprising's outbreak and the Java War began in July 1825. By the end of the Java War, around 1830, Tan had fallen into debt, and was forced to sell his lands to pay them off. He died on 10 May 1831, and was buried at his family's cemetery at Rogocolo, south of Yogyakarta.

== Personal life ==
Some sources wrote that Tan married twice, while others wrote that he married thrice. One of his wives was of Chinese descent, and another was the daughter of a Javanese aristocrat. He had at least two children. His home – which he reportedly only lived in from Friday to Sunday, staying at the Yogyakarta Keraton in the weekdays – in modern Yogyakarta city is a heritage site.
