= Portrait of Stamford Raffles =

Painting by George Francis Joseph

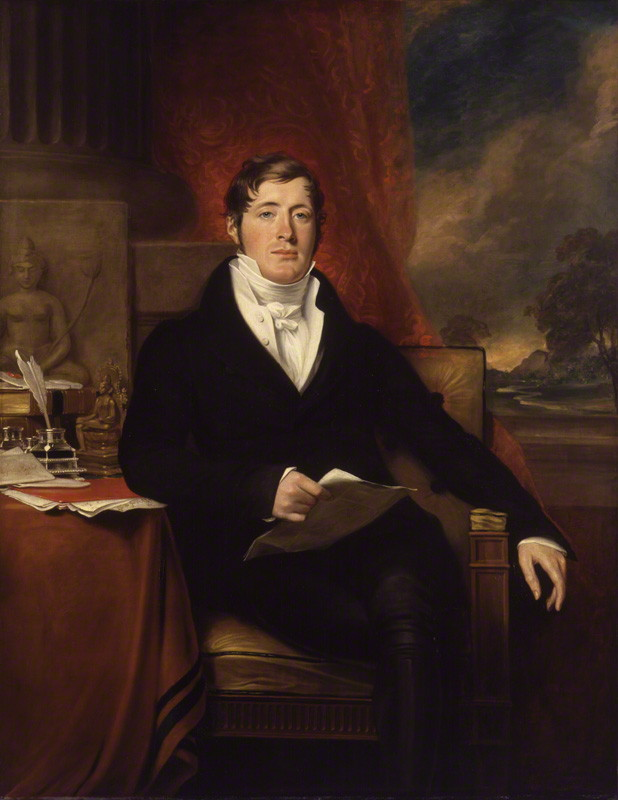
- Artist: George Francis Joseph
- Year: 1817
- Type: Oil on canvas, portrait painting
- Dimensions: 139.7 cm × 109.2 cm (55.0 in × 43.0 in)
- Location: National Portrait Gallery; London

Portrait of Stamford Raffles is an 1817 portrait painting by the English artist George Francis Joseph depicting the British colonial official Sir Stamford Raffles. He had served as Governor of the Dutch East Indies during their occupation by Britain in the Napoleonic Wars and was later credited as the founder of Singapore.

Raffles sat for the painting while in England to oversee the publication of his book The History of Java. Around the same time he sat for the sculptor Francis Leggatt Chantrey. He is shown in the court dress he wore to Carlton House to receive his knighthood from the Prince Regent the same year. Behind him are Javanese artefacts to commemorate his interest in the history and culture of Southeast Asia.

Joseph was a prominent portraitist and Associate member of the Royal Academy, probably best known for his portrait of the Prime Minister Spencer Perceval. The painting of Raffles is today in the National Portrait Gallery in London, having been acquired in 1859 in a gift from the sitter's nephew.

== Bibliography ==
- Boulger, Demetrius Charles. The Life of Sir Stamford Raffles. H. Marshall, 1897
- Clair, Colin. Sir Stamford Raffles, Founder of Singapore. Bruce & Gawthorn, 1963.
- Glendinning, Victoria. Raffles: And the Golden Opportunity. Profile Books, 2012.
- Wood, Gillen D’Arcy. Tambora: The Eruption That Changed the World. Princeton University Press, 2015.
