= Sack of Yogyakarta =

June 1812 British military conquest and looting in Java

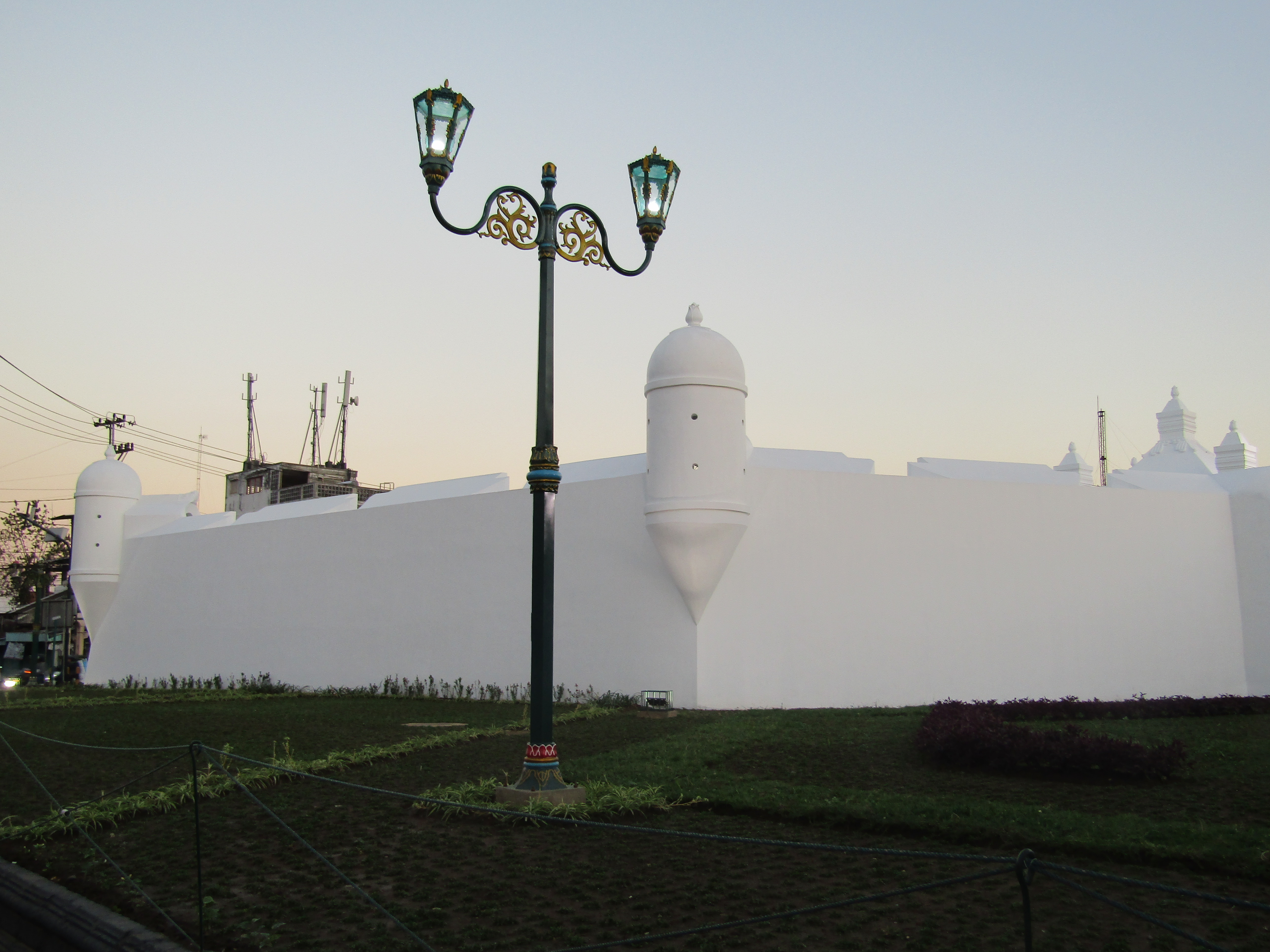
- The corner of Lor Wetan Fortress, part of the Baluarti Fort of Yogyakarta Palace where most of the battle took place
Date	20 June 1812
Location	Yogyakarta 7.8055°S 110.3642°E
Result	British victory; Hamengkubuwono II deposed; Accession of Hamengkubuwono III

Belligerents
Yogyakarta Sultanate	United Kingdom; Mangkunegaran

Commanders and leaders
Hamengkubuwono II (surrendered)	Stamford Raffles; Robert Gillespie (WIA); Mangkunegara II

Strength
6,000 or less	c. 1,000 (British/Sepoy); 500 (Mangkunegaran)

Casualties and losses
Hundreds killed	23 killed 76 wounded

The Sack of Yogyakarta, also known in Indonesia as Geger Sepehi ("Sepoy tumult") took place on 20 June 1812, during British rule of Java. Under Robert Rollo Gillespie, a British expeditionary force assaulted the keraton of Yogyakarta, deposing the reigning Sultan of Yogyakarta Hamengkubuwono II after a series of disputes between the sultan and colonial rule.

Tensions between the British and the Yogyakarta Sultanate arose shortly after the British takeover of Java, and despite a treaty in late 1811, both sides began preparations for war with Hamengkubuwono II preparing a military rebellion against the British. Conflict erupted in June 1812 as the British dispatched over 1,000 soldiers to Yogyakarta, which captured the keraton by storm on 20 June. Hamengkubuwono II was captured and exiled, with his son Hamengkubuwono III installed as new Sultan. British and Sepoy troops also plundered the keraton, seizing a large amount of treasure along with Javanese literary works and archives.

== Background ==
In August 1811, the United Kingdom invaded Java, overthrowing the Franco-Dutch colonial government by September. In the immediate aftermath of the takeover, the native states of Central Java – the Yogyakarta Sultanate and the Surakarta Sunanate – began communicating with the British colonial government. Yogyakarta and Surakarta had seen a significant reduction in powers during the brief Franco-Dutch rule under Herman Willem Daendels, and filed many complaints to the new government. At Yogyakarta in particular, Sultan Hamengkubuwono II took advantage of the change in colonial government in order to depose his son, Prince Regent Surojo, who had gained his regency during the Franco-Dutch period.

A new British resident in Yogyakarta, John Crawfurd, was installed in November 1811. Crawfurd quickly alienated Hamengkubuwono II, against orders from his superior Stamford Raffles, and advocated in writing to Raffles to depose Hamengkubuwono II and install Surojo as Sultan. British–Yogyakartan relations were further strained by the behavior of British Sepoy troops of the Bengal Army stationed in Yogyakarta. Raffles, in command of just over 1,000 troops, initially restrained Crawfurd as he was concerned of conflict with Yogyakarta – which, at that time, could raise up to 10,000 fighting men. Following a visit by Raffles to Yogyakarta in December, the British agreed to return most Yogyakartan lands annexed during Daendels' rule. However, both sides expected a military confrontation within the short term, and began military preparations. Throughout early 1812, Hamengkubuwono II purged Surojo's supporters in his court, and reached out to Surakarta for an alliance against the British.

== Order of battle ==
British forces assembled at the city of Semarang, but initial plans were delayed due to an expedition against the Palembang Sultanate. The British expedition force to Yogyakarta consisted of around 1,000 men, including the grenadier company of the 59th (2nd Nottinghamshire) Regiment of Foot's 1st Battalion and three companies of the 78th (Highlanders) Regiment of Foot, reinforced by a detachment of the Madras Horse Artillery and elements of the Bengal Army, 14th (Buckinghamshire) Regiment of Foot, 22nd Light Dragoons and Royal Artillery. 500 men of the Legiun Mangkunegaran also took part in the expedition, under the command of Mangkunegara II.

According to a British major involved in the siege, William Thorn, Yogyakarta was defended by 17,000 soldiers. This was likely an exaggeration. In 2024, historians McKinnon and Carey wrote that the number of defenders were 6,000 or less. Surakartan forces, which had been assembling in Surakarta in the leadup to the siege, numbered around 7,000, but they did not take part in the battle despite an agreement with the Sultan that Surakartan forces would attack the British rear. Later accounts from Yogyakartan authors commented that their involvement would likely not have changed the outcome of the battle.

== Assault ==
By 8 June, the British forces had returned from Palembang to Semarang and began marching inland towards Yogyakarta under the command of Robert Rollo Gillespie. They had approached Yogyakarta by 18 June, when an advance group of hussars got into a skirmish with a group of Javanese pikemen. While the pikemen retreated following the arrival of other British forces, six hussars were killed in the action with thirteen wounded. Most of the British soldiers had arrived at Yogyakarta's Fort Vredeburg by 19 June, and the order to attack the Yogyakarta keraton was given before dawn on 20 June.

British commanders divided their attacking force into three columns: one with Bengal Sepoys and Mangkunegaran soldiers attacking the keraton's south gate, one of Bengal Sepoys and Madras troops attacking the north gate, and a main attack by units of the 59th and 78th regiments plus Bengal Sepoys from the east in an attempted stealth assault on the walls, carrying bamboo scaling ladders provided by Yogyakartan Kapitan Cina Tan Jin Sing. The eastern column was discovered by Yogyakartan defenders, and came under heavy artillery fire which inflicted some casualties. The assault was launched, and after a brief fight Sepoy troops managed to lower a drawbridge, allowing the column to enter the keraton. The assault on the south gate was similarly met with heavy resistance, but managed to breach the gate and the Yogyakartan defending commander Raden Tumenggung Sumodiningrat was killed. Captured Yogyakartan artillery pieces on the walls were turned against the keraton, while guns of the Royal Artillery continued to bombard the keraton.

Hamengkubuwono II was in the inner court of the keraton, and when British troops reached him, he along with his entourage were dressed in white to surrender. He was sent to the British resident's home as a prisoner, and his personal keris was seized and sent to Governor-General Minto in Calcutta. Throughout the assault, 23 British soldiers were killed and 76 were wounded (including Gillespie, who was shot at his left arm). Yogyakartan losses were significantly more, with hundreds killed.

== Sacking ==
The British forces looted the keraton after capturing Hamengkubuwono II, with the total value of captured treasure exceeding 850,000 rixdollar. Gillespie personally received 74,000 Spanish dollars out of the loot, and much of the treasure was remitted to Calcutta. Both British and Sepoy troops plundered the Yogyakartan court, stealing valuables such as jewel-encrusted keris and jewelry from Yogyakartan nobles and ladies. According to a Javanese account, the keraton was plundered for more than four whole days, with nobles and their retainers being forced by the troops to transport looted valuables.

Beyond jewelry and valuables, the British forces also looted Babad texts, government archives, gamelan instruments, and other manuscripts and texts, reportedly leaving just a single Quran unlooted. Many of the texts were later sold or donated to the British Museum or other British institutions. In Yogyakarta, the attack and ensuing plundering became known as Geger Sepoy ("Sepoy tumult").

== Aftermath ==
Hamengkubuwono II along with two of his sons were exiled by the British to Penang in July, while Surojo became Sultan Hamengkubuwono III on 21 June 1812. He would sign a treaty with the British shortly after, agreeing to cede territories and allowing for the creation of the semi-independent Pakualaman carved out of Yogyakartan lands. Yogyakarta's (and Surakarta's) military was severely restricted in size, with most Yogyakartan soldiers being dismissed and being forced to become bandits or robbers.

In the 21st century, the modern Yogyakartan Sultanate had made repeated requests to the British government for the return of manuscripts looted in 1812. As of 2023, the British Library had provided digital copies of 120 manuscripts, while the Yogyakartan Sultanate claimed that there were 7,500 physical manuscripts present in British archives. Descendants of Hamengkubuwono II also requested President Prabowo Subianto, himself also a descendant of Hamengkubuwono II to form a dedicated committee to ensure the return of looted manuscripts, and demanding Charles III to return the stolen manuscripts in full, not just digital copies.
