= George Francis Joseph =

English painter (1764–1846)

George Francis Joseph ARA (1764 – 1846) was an English portrait painter.

== Life ==
He was born 25 November 1764, and became a student at the Royal Academy in 1784. In 1813 he was elected an Associate of the Academy. He practised in London until 1836, when he retired to Cambridge; there he died in 1846, having continued to exhibit at the Academy until that year, and was buried in St. Michael's churchyard.

== Works ==
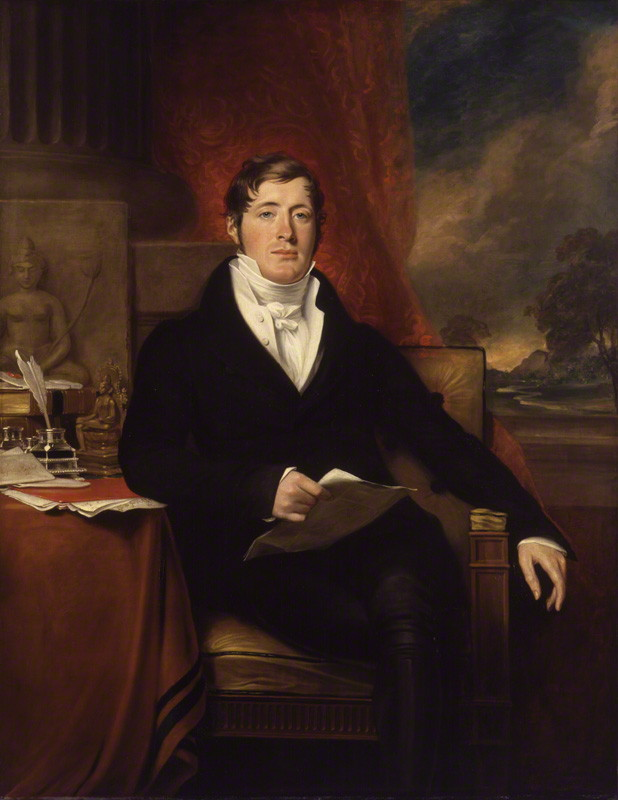
Portrait of Stamford Raffles by Joseph, 1817

In 1792 Joseph gained the Royal Academy gold medal for a Scene from Coriolanus. He had sent his first contribution to the Academy in 1788, and became a constant exhibitor both there and at the British Institution. In 1797 he painted Mrs. Siddons as the Tragic Muse. In 1811 the British Institution awarded him a premiums for his Return of Priam with the dead body of Hector, and again in 1812 for his Procession to Calvary.

Joseph painted "fancy" subjects, and made designs for book illustrations, but is best known as a portrait-painter. His portraits both in oil and miniature are numerous, and some of them have been engraved. His portraits of Spencer Perceval, painted in 1812, and Sir Stamford Raffles (1817) went to the National Portrait Gallery, London.

== Notes ==
Attribution

This article incorporates text from a publication now in the public domain: Lee, Sidney, ed. (1892). "Joseph, George Francis". Dictionary of National Biography. Vol. 30. London: Smith, Elder & Co.
