= List of monarchs of Java =

This is a partial list of the identified hereditary rulers on the Indonesian island Java, and the adjacent island Madura.

Included are some states and rulers whose existence remain open to conjecture, due to inadequate historical evidence, while others are historically verifiable. Some rulers are also considered to be mythical in that although evidence is available to claim their places in various royal family trees, there are no independent items of corroborating evidence to clarify their existence.

Some of these have continued as titular entities after the achievement of Indonesian independence in 1945.

== Ruler of Jawadwipa ==
- Dewawarman (fl. 132)

== Rulers of Tarumanagara ==
- Pinabahu (4th–5th centuries)
- Purnawarman (early 5th century) [grandson?]
- Po Tuo Jia (fl. 424)
- Dwarawarman (?) (fl. 435)

== Rulers of Sunda ==
- Jayabhupati (fl. 1030)
- Prabu Maharaja Wangsa (?–1357)
- Hyang Bunisora (regent 1357–?)
- Prabu Niskalawastu Kancana [son of Prabu Maharaja Wangsa]
- Rahyang Dewa Niskala [son]
- Sri Baduga Maharaja (1482–1521) [son]
- Prabu Surawisesa [son]
- Prabu Ratudewata
- Sang Ratu Saksi
- Tohaan di Majaya
- Nusiya Mulya (c. 1559/67–1579)
- The Sunda Kingdom was conquered by Banten

== Rulers of ancient Java ==
- Queen Shima (queen, fl. 674)
- Sanna (c. 700)
- Sanjaya (Sang Ratu i Halu) (fl. 732) [nephew]
- Rakai Panangkaran (746–784)
- Rakai Panungalan (784–803)
- Samaragrawira (Rakai Warak Dyah Manara) (803–827)
- Dyah Gula (827–828)
- Rakai Patapan (828–847)
- Rakai Pikatan (847–855)
- Kayuwangi Dyah Lokapala (855–885)
- Dyah Tagwas (885)
- Rake Panumwangan Dyah Dewendra (885–887)
- Rake Gurunwangi Dyah Bhadra (887)
- Rake Wungkal Humalang Dyah Jbang (894–898)
- Rake Watukara, Balitung (898–c. 910) [son?]
- Rake Hino, Daksa (fl. 913–915) [brother-in-law?]
- Rakai Layang, Tulodong (fl. 919–921) [son of Balitung]
- Rake Pangkaya, Wawa (fl. 927–928)
- Rake Hino, Sindok (fl. 929–947) [grandson of Daksa?]
- Śri Iśanatunggawijaya (10th century) [son]
- Makutawamśa Anantawikrama (?–c. 990/1) [son]
- Dharmawamśa Anantawikrama (c. 990/1–1016) [son?]
- Airlangga 1019–1042; died 1049 [son-in-law]
- The Javanese kingdom is split into Janggala and Kediri

== Shailendra dynasty ==
- Bhanu (fl. 732)
- Wishnu, Dharmatungga (before 775–782) [son?]
- Indra, Sangramadhanamjaya (782?–812?) [son?]
- Samaratungga (812?–832?) [son]
- Balaputradewa (c. 832–855) [son]
- The dynasty continues to rule Śriwijaya on Sumatra

== Rulers in ancient East Java ==
- Dewasimha (7th or 8th century)
- Gajayana (8th century) [son]
- A[ ... ]nana (fl. 760) [grandson]

== Rulers of Janggala ==
- Mapanji Garasakan (1042–1052) [son of Airlangga]
- Mapanji Alanjung Ahyes (1052–c. 1059) [brother]
- Samarotsaha (fl. 1059) [brother]

== Rulers of Kediri ==
- Samarawijaya (1042–?) [son of Airlangga]
- Jyitêndrakara (fl. 1051–1112)
- Bameśwara (fl. 1112–1135)
- Jayabhaya (fl. 1135–1159)
- Sarwweśwara (fl. 1159–1161)
- Aryyeśwara (fl. 1171–1174?)
- Kroncaryyadipa, Gandra (fl. 1181)
- Kameśwara (fl. 1182?–1185)
- Kertajaya, Dangdang Gendis (before 1194–1222)
- Kediri is taken over by Singasari 1222–1292
- Jayakatwang (1292–1293)

== Rulers of Singhasari ==
- Ken Angrok, Rajasa (1222–1227)
- Anuśapati, Panji Anengah (1227–1248) [stepson]
- Panji Tohjaya (1248) [son of Ken Angrok]
- Ranggawuni, Wisnuwardhana (1248–1268) [son of Anuśapati]
- Kertanagara, Siwabuddha (1268–1292) [son]
- Jayakatwang (usurper 1292–1293)
- Singasari is incorporated into Majapahit

== Rulers of Majapahit ==
- Kertarajasa (Raden Wijaya) (1294–1309)
- Jayanagara (Kala Gemet) (1309–1328) [son]
- Tribhuwana Wijayatunggadewi (1328–1350) [sister]
- Rajasanagara (Hayam Wuruk) (1350–1389) [son]
- Wikramawardhana (Bhre Hyang Wiśesa) (1390–1429) [nephew]
- Suhita (1429–1447) [daughter]
- Kertawijaya (Wijayaparakramawardhana) (1447–1451) [brother]
- Rajasawardhana (Sinagara) (1451–1453)
- Giriśawardhana (Hyang Purwawiśesa) (1456–1466) [brother]
- Singhawikramawardhana (Bhre Pandan Salas) (1466–1474) [brother]
- Girindrawardhana Ranawijaya (1474-1498)
- Bhatara Wijaya (fl. 1513) [grandson of Rajasawardhana]
- Patih Udara (1498-1527) [of the patih family]
- Majapahit is conquered by Demak

== Rulers of Blambangan ==
- Mas Sembar or Minak Sembar
- Bima Koncar/Minak Sumedhe [son]
- Menak Pentor (fl. 1513) [son]
- Santaguna (fl. c. 1575)
- N.N. (fl. 1588)
- N.N. (?–1597) [son]
- Mas Karian (?–1632; died 1633)
- Sunan Tawangalun I (Pangeran Singasari) (1633–1639) [son of Sunan Rebut Payung or Minak Lumpat]
- Prabhu Tawangalun II (Mas Senepo) (1645–1691) [son]
- Pangeran Pati (1691) [stepson of Mas Senepo]
- Mancanagara and Sasranegara (brief rule because of war between Pangeran Pati, Mancanegara and Sasranegara, 1691–1692) [brothers]
- Mancanapura (Dalem Agung) (1692–1697) [brother]
- Pangeran Putra (Danureja) (1697–1736) [son of Sasranegara]
- Danuningrat (1736–1763; died 1766) [son]
- Pangeran Wilis (1767–1768) [brother]
- Blambangan was conquered by the Dutch East India Company

== Rulers of Demak ==
- Pate Rodim I (Arya Sumangsang) (late 15th century–1504?)
- Pate Rodim II (Arya Trenggana) (c. 1504–1518) [son]
- Pate Unus (c. 1518–1521) [brother-in-law]
- Pate Rodim II (Arya Trenggana) (second time, c. 1521–1546)
- Sunan Prawata (c. 1546–1549) [son]
- Pangeran Kediri (c. 1549–?) [nephew]
- Pangeran Mas Juruh (?–1588; died 1604) [son]

== Rulers of Pajang ==
- Jaka Tingkir (c. 1549–1587)
- Pangeran Benawa I (1588–1589) [son]
- Pangeran Benawa II (1591–1618) [son]
- Pajang was merged into Mataram

== Rulers of Giri ==
- Prabhu Satmata (1485–1506)
- Sunan Dalem (1506–1545/46) [son]
- Sunan Seda Margi (1545/46–1548) [son]
- Sunan Prapen (1548–1605) [brother]
- Panembahan Kawis Gua (1605–1621) [son]
- Panembahan Agung (1621–1626) [son]
- Panembahan Mas Witana (1626–1680) [son]
- Giri was taken by Mataram and the Dutch East India Company

== Rulers of Surabaya ==
- Kyai Sinuhun Ngampeldenta (Pangeran Rakhman) (c. 1500)
- Pecat Tanda Terung (Pate Bubat?) (fl. 1513?)
- Pangeran Tundungmusuh [son]
- Pangeran Lena [son]
- Pangeran Jebuk [son]
- Pangeran Wanakrama (Wiryakrama?) (late 16th century) [son]
- Panembahan Rama [son]
- Pangeran Surabaya [son]
- Pangeran Sunjaya [brother]
- Raden Jayalengkara (?-1625; died 1630)
- Surabaya conquered by Mataram (1625)

== Rulers of Pasuruan ==
- Menak Sepetak (fl. 1513) [son of Patih Udara of Majapahit]
- Adipati Dengkol [son]
- Adipati Pekik (?–1614) [son of Surabaya ruler]
- Ki Gede Kapulungan (regent 1614?–1616/17)
- Pasuruan conquered by Mataram in 1616 or 1617
- Surapati, Wiranegara I (1686–1706)
- Wiranegara II (1706–1707) [son]
- Pasuruan is conquered by the Dutch East India Company

== Rulers of Tuban ==
- Kyai Arya Papringan
- Raden Arya Rangga Lawe (c. 1300) [grandson]
- Sira Lawe [son]
- Raden Arya Sira Weneng [son]
- Sira Lena [son]
- Raden Arya Dikara [son]
- Arya Teja [son-in-law]
- Raden Arya Wilatikta (Pate Vira) (fl. 1513) [son]
- Kyai Arya Ngrasena [grandson-in-law]
- Kyai Arya Gegelang [son]
- Kyai Arya Batubang [son]
- Pangeran Arya Balewot [son]
- Pangeran Sekar Tanjung [son]
- Pangeran Ngangsar [brother]
- Pangeran Arya Pamalad (fl. c. 1587) [son of Pangeran Sekar Tanjung]
- Arya Salempe [brother]
- Pangeran Dalem (?–1619) [son of Pangeran Arya Pamalad]
- Tuban is conquered by Mataram

== Rulers of Cirebon ==
- Sunan Gunungjati (Fattahillah or Faletehan) born named Pangeran Syarief Hidayatullah (1527–1570)
- Panembahan Ratu (c. 1570–1650) [great-grandson]
- Pangeran Giri Laya (c. 1650–1662) [grandson]
- Cirebon is split into the Kraton Kasepuhan, Kraton Kanoman and Kraton Kacirebonan (Panembahan Cirebon) lines

=== Rulers of Cirebon, Kraton Kasepuhan ===
- Sultan Sepuh I Syamsuddin (1662–1697) [son of Pangeran Giri Laya]
- Sultan Sepuh II Jamaluddin (1697–1723) [son]
- Sultan Sepuh III Muhammad Zainuddin (1723–1753) [son]
- Sultan Sepuh IV Muhammad Zainuddin (1753–1773) [son]
- Sultan Sepuh V Sapiuddin (1773–1786) [son]
- Sultan Sepuh VI (1786–1791) [brother]
- Sultan Sepuh VII Joharuddin (1791–1816) [son]
- Sultan Sepuh VIII Syamsuddin (1816–1819; titular sultan 1819–1843) (brother)
- Titular sultans of Kraton Kasepuhan since 1819
- Sultan Sepuh IX Raja Syamsuddin (1843–1853) [son]
- Sultan Sepuh X Raja Dipati Satria (1853–1875) [son]
- Pangeran Jayawikarta (regent-sultan 1875–1880) [brother]
- Sultan Sepuh XI Raja Atmaja (1880–1885) [brother]
- Sultan Sepuh XII Raja Aluda Tajularifin (1885–1942) [son]
- Sultan Sepuh XIII Raja Rajaningrat (1942–1969) [son]
- Sultan Sepuh XIV Pangeran Raja Adipati Maulana Pakuningrat (1969–2010) [son]
- Sultan Sepuh XV Arif Natadiningrat (2010–) [son]

=== Rulers of Cirebon, Kraton Kanoman ===
- Sultan Anom I Badruddin (1662–1703) [son of Pangeran Giri Laya]
- Sultan Anom II (1703–1706) [son]
- Sultan Anom III Muhammad Alimuddin (1719–1732) [son]
- Sultan Anom IV Khairuddin (1744–1797) [son]
- Sultan Anom V Imanuddin (1797–1807) [son]
- Sultan Anom VI Muhammad Kamaruddin (1807–1819; titular sultan 1819–1851) [son]
- Titular sultans of Kraton Kanoman since 1819
- Sultan Anom VII Muhammad Kamaruddin (1851–1871) [son]
- Pangeran Raja Kaprabon (regent-sultan 1871–1879) [brother]
- Sultan Anom VIII Raja Dulkarnain (1879–1934) [son of Sultan Anom VII]
- Sultan Anom IX Nurbuat (1934–1935) [son]
- Sultan Anom X Muhammad Nurus (1935–1989) [son]
- Sultan Anom XI Muhammad Jalaluddin (1989–2002) [son]
- Sultan Anom XII Muhammad Saladin (2002) [son]
- Sultan Anom XIII Muhammad Emiruddin (2003–) [brother]

=== Rulers of Cirebon, Panembahan line ===
- Panembahan Cirebon I Muhammad Nasruddin (1662–1714) [son of Pangeran Giri Laya]
- Panembahan Cirebon II Muhammad Muhyiddin (1725–1731) [son]
- Panembahan Cirebon III Muhammad Tair Yarini Sabirin (1752–1773) [son]

=== Rulers of Cirebon, Kraton Kacirebonan ===
- Pangeran Arya Cirebon, Kamaruddin (1697–1723) [son of Sultan Sepuh I]
- Sultan Cirebon I Muhammad Akbaruddin (1723–1734) [son]
- Sultan Cirebon II Muhammad Salihuddin (1734–1758) [brother]
- Sultan Cirebon III Muhammad Harruddin (1758–1768) [nephew]
- Sultan Cirebon IV (1808–1810; died 1814) [son of Sultan Anom III]

== Rulers of Banten ==
- Hasanuddin (c. 1552–1570) [son of Sunan Gunungjati]
- Maulana Yusuf (c. 1570–1580) [son]
- Maulana Muhammad (c. 1580–1596) [son]
- Sultan Abdul Qadir (1596–1651) [son]
- Sultan Abu’lma’ali Ahmad (1638–c. 1650) [son]
- Sultan Ageng Tirtayasa, Abu’l Fatah (1651–1680; died 1692) [son]
- Sultan Haji, Abdulkahar (1680–1687) [son]
- Abu’l Fadhl Muhammad Yahya (1687–1690) [son]
- Abu’l Mahasin Muhammad Zainulabidin (1690–1733) [brother]
- Abu’l Fatah Muhammad Syafei (1733–1748; died 1758) [son]
- Ratu Syarifah Fatima (regent 1748–1750; died 1751) [wife]
- Abu’lma’ali Muhammad Wasi al-Halimin (1750–1753; died 1760) [brother of Abu’l Fatah]
- Abu Nazar Muhammad Arif Zainal Asyekin (1753–1777) [son of Abu’l Fatah]
- Abu’l Mofakhir Muhammad Aliuddin I (1777–1802) [son]
- Abu’l Fath Muhammad Muhyuddin (1802–1805) [brother]
- Abu Nazar Muhammad Isyak (1805–1808; died 1842) [son of Abu’l Mofakhir]
- Abu’l Mofakhir Muhammad Aliuddin II (1808–1810; died 1849) [brother]
- Muhammad Tsafiuddin (1810–1811) [son of Abu’l Fath]
- Pangeran Ahmad (regent 1811–1813)
- Muhammad Muhyuddin (regent 1813–1816)
- Muhammad Rafiuddin (1816–1832; died 1900) [son of Muhammad Tsafiuddin]

== Rulers of Mataram ==
- Kyai Gede Pamanahan (1556–1579)
- Panembahan Senapati Ingalaga (1579–1601) [son]
- Panembahan Seda ing Krapyak (1601–1613) [son]
- Sultan Agung (1613–1646) [son]
- Amangkurat I (1646–1677) [son]
- Amangkurat II (1677–1703) [son]
- Amangkurat III (1703–1708; died 1733) [son]
- Pakubuwono I (1704–1719) [uncle]
- Amangkurat IV (1719–1726) [son]
- Pakubuwono II (1726–1742) [son]
- Amangkurat V (1742-1743) [grandson of Amangkurat III]
- Pakubuwono II (second time, 1743–1749)
- Pakubuwono III (1749–1755; of Surakarta 1755–1788) [son]
- Mataram was split into Surakarta and Yogyakarta

== Rulers of Surakarta ==
- Pakubuwono II (1745–1749) [son of Amangkurat IV of Mataram]
- Pakubuwono III (1749–1788) [son]
- Pakubuwono IV (1788–1820) [son]
- Pakubuwono V (1820–1823) [son]
- Pakubuwono VI (1823–1830; died 1849) [son]
- Pakubuwono VII (1830–1858) [uncle]
- Pakubuwono VIII (1858–1861) [brother]
- Pakubuwono IX (1861–1893) [son of Pakubuwono VI]
- Pakubuwono X (1893–1939) [son]
- Pakubuwono XI (1939–1945) [son]
- Pakubuwono XII (1945–2004) [son]
- Pakubuwono XIII (2004–2025) [son]

== Rulers of Yogyakarta ==
- Hamengkubuwono I (1755–1792) [son of Amangkurat IV of Mataram]
- Hamengkubuwono II (1792–1810) [son]
- Hamengkubuwono III (1810–1811) [son]
- Hamengkubuwono II (second time, 1811–1812)
- Hamengkubuwono III (second time, 1812–1814)
- Hamengkubuwono IV (1814–1823) [son]
- Hamengkubuwono V (1823–1826) [son]
- Hamengkubuwono II (third time, 1826–1828)
- Hamengkubuwono V (second time, 1828–1855)
- Hamengkubuwono VI (1855–1877) [brother]
- Hamengkubuwono VII (1877–1921) [son]
- Hamengkubuwono VIII (1921–1939) [son]
- Hamengkubuwono IX (1939–1988) [son]
- Hamengkubuwono X (1988–) [son]

== Rulers of Mangkunegaran ==
- Mangkunegara I (1757–1795) [Son of Crown Prince Arya Mangkunegara Kartasura and Grandson of Amangkurat IV of Mataram]
- Mangkunegara II (1795–1835) [Son of Crown Prince Arya Prabumijaya I and Grandson of Mangkunegara I]
- Mangkunegara III (1835–1853) [Son of BRAy Sayati, and Grandson of Mangkunegara II]
- Mangkunegara IV (1853–1881) [Son of RAy Sekeli, First cousin of Mangkunegara III and Grandson of Mangkunegara II]
- Mangkunegara V (1881–1896) [Son of Mangkunegara IV]
- Mangkunegara VI (1896–1916; died 1928) [Younger Brother of Mangkunegara V]
- Mangkunegara VII (1916–1944) [Son of Mangkunegara V]
- Mangkunegara VIII (1944–1987) [Son of Mangkunegara VII]
- Mangkunegara IX (1987–2021) [Son of Mangkunegara VIII]
- Mangkunegara X (2022–) [Son of Mangkunegara IX]

== Rulers of Pakualaman ==
- Paku Alam I (1812–1829) [son of Hamengkubuwono I of Yogyakarta]
- Paku Alam II (1829–1858) [son]
- Paku Alam III (1858–1864) [son]
- Paku Alam IV (1864–1878) [nephew]
- Paku Alam V (1878–1900) [uncle]
- Paku Alam VI (1901–1902) [son]
- Paku Alam VII (1906–1937) [son]
- Paku Alam VIII (1937–1998) [son]
- Paku Alam IX (1999–2015) [son]
- Paku Alam X (2016–) [son]

== Rulers of Kalibawang ==
- Mangkudiningrat (1831) [grandson of Hamengkubuwono II of Yogyakarta]
- Pangeran Adipati Natapraja (1831–1853) [brother]
- Incorporated into Yogyakarta

== Ruler of Nangulan ==
- Pangeran Prabu Adiningrat (1831–1833) [son-in-law of Hamengkubuwono III of Yogyakarta]
- Brought under Dutch direct rule

== Rulers of Bangkalan ==
- Raden Lembu Peteng
- Arya Menger [son]
- Arya Pratikel [son]
- Arya Pojok [son-in-law]
- Ki Demung [son]
- Ki Pragalba (?–1531) [son]
- Raden Pratanu (1531–1592/96) [son]
- Raden Kara (1592/6–1621) [son]
- Pangeran Mas (1621–1624) [brother]
- Cakraningrat I (1624–1648) [son]
- Raden Demang Malaya Kusuma (regent (?) 1648–1656) [brother]
- Cakraningrat II (1648–1707) [son of Cakraningrat I]
- Cakraningrat III (1707–1718) [son]
- Cakraningrat IV (1718–1745) [brother]
- Cakraningrat V (1745–1770) [son]
- Cakraningrat VI (1770–1780) [son]
- Cakraningrat VII (1780–1815) [brother]
- Cakraningrat VIII (1815–1847) [son]
- Cakraningrat IX (1847–1862) [son of Cakraningrat VI]
- Cakraningrat X (1862–1882) [son]
- Cakraningrat XI (1882–1885, of Bangkalan 1885–1905) [son of Cakraningrat VIII]
- Regents of Bangkalan 1885-1957
- Suryanegara (1905–1918) [son]
- Cakraningrat XII (1918–1945) [brother]
- Muhammad Aziz Cakraningrat XIII (1948–1956) [son]
- R. A. Muhammad Ruslan (1956–1957) [brother]

== Rulers of Sumenep ==
- Raden Tumenggung Kanduruwan (?–1579)
- Pangeran Ellor I (c. 1579–?) [son]
- Pangeran Wetan (c. 1600) [brother]
- Pangeran Ellor II (?–1624) [son]
- Kyai Mas Anggadipa (1624–?)
- Arya Yang Pati (?–1671)
- Yudanegara (1671–1684) [grandson of Pangeran Ellor II]
- Pulang Jiwa (1684–1702) [son-in-law]
- Cakranegara I (1702–1705) [son-in-law]
- Suderma (1705–1707) [grandson of Yudanegara]
- Cakranegara II (1707–1737) [son of Cakranegara I]
- Cakranegara III (1737–1750) [nephew]
- Bendara Saud (1750–1767) [son-in-law of Cakranegara I]
- Tirtanegara (1767–1811) [son]
- Natadiningrat (regent 1804–1810) [son]
- Sultan Paku Nataningrat (1811–1854) [brother]
- Natakusuma (1854–1879) [son]
- Pangeran Pakunataningrat (regent 1883–1901) [brother]
- Pangeran Arya Prataming Kusuma (regent 1901–1926) [son]
- Tumenggung Arya Prabuwinata (regent 1926–1929) [son]

== Rulers of Pamekasan ==
- Adikara I (1685–1708) [son-in-law of Yudanegara of Sumenep]
- Adikara II (1708–1737) [son]
- Adikara III (1737–1743) [brother]
- Adikara IV (1743–1750) [son of Adikara II]
- Adiningrat (1750–1752) [son]
- Aria Cakraadiningrat I, R. Alsari (1752–1800) [son of Adikara III]
- Aria Cakraadiningrat II, R. Alsana (1800–1804) [brother]
- Panembahan Mangku Adiningrat (1804–1842) [son of Cakraningrat VII of Madura]
- Pangeran Aria Suriakusuma (1842–1853) [grandson]

== See also ==
- Isyana dynasty
- Kingdom of Pajang
- Kingdoms of Sunda
- Rajasa dynasty
- Sanjaya dynasty
- Sultanate of Banten
- Sultanate of Demak
- Sultanate of Cirebon
- Yogyakarta Sultanate

== Bibliography ==
- Atja & Saleh Danasasmita, Carita Parahiyangan (transkripsi, terjemahan dan catatan), Bandung: Proyek Pengembangan Permuseuman Jawa Barat 1981.
- Casparis, Johannes de, Prasasti Indonesia, Vol. I. Bandung: A.C. Nix 1950.
- Coedès, Georges, The Indianized States of Southeast Asia, Honolulu: University of Hawaii 1968.
- De Graaf, H.J. de, Geschiedenis van Idonesië. '-Gravenhage & Bandung: Van Hoeve 1949.
- De Graaf, H.J. & Pigeaud, Th., De eerste moslimse vorstendomen op Java: studien over de staatkundige geschiedenis van de 15de en 16de eeuw (Verhandelingen van het Koninklijk Instituut voor Taal-, Land- en Volkenkunde 69), 's-Gravenhage: M. Nijhoff 1974. ISBN 90-247-1636-5.
- Hall, D.G.E., A History of Southeast Asia. Houndmills: Macmillan 1981. ISBN 0-333-24164-9.
- Jordaan, Roy, Imagine Buddha in Prambanan, Leiden: Rijksuniversiteit te Leiden 1993. ISBN 90-73084-08-3.
- Krom, N.J., Hindoe-javaansche geschiedenis, 's-Gravenhage, M. Nijhoff 1931.
- Nagtegaal, Luc, 'The legitimacy of rule in early modern Madura', in Dijk, Kees van, et al. [eds.], Across Madura Strait, Leiden: KITLV Press 1995. ISBN 90-6718-091-2.
- Noorduyn, J., 'Majapahit in the fifteenth century', Bijdragen tot de Taal-, Land- en Volkenkunde 134 1978.
- Poesponegoro, Marwati Djoened, & Notosusanto, Nugroho, Sejarah nasional Indonesia, Vol. II. Jakarta: Balai Pustaka 1993. ISBN 979-407-408-X.
- Selayang pandang penguasa pradja Paku Alaman. Surakarta: Bebadan - Museum Puro Paku Alaman 1990.
- Stokvis, A.M.H.J., Manuel d’histoire, de généalogie et de chronologie de tous les états du globe, Tome I: Asie, Afrique, Amerique, Polynésie, Leiden 1888.
- Sulendraningrat, P.S., Sejarah Cirebon, Jakarta: Balai Pustaka 1985.
- Sunardjo, E.H. Unang, Selayang pandang sejarah masa kejayaan kerajaan Cirebon. Cirebon: Yayasan Keraton Kasepuhan Cirebon 1996.
- Sutherland, Heather, 'Notes on Java's regent families', Indonesia 17 1973 and 19 1974.
- Truhart, Peter, Regents of Nations. Systematic Chronology of States and Their Political Representatives in Past and Present. A Biographical Reference Book, Part 3: Asia & Pacific Oceania, München: Saur 2003, pp. 1227–1238, 1318–1319, ISBN 3-598-21545-2.
- Werdisastra, Raden, Babad Sumanep, Pasuruan: Garoeda Buana Inda 1996.
