= Duke of Pakualaman =

- Adipati Pakualaman
- Coat of arms of Pakualaman

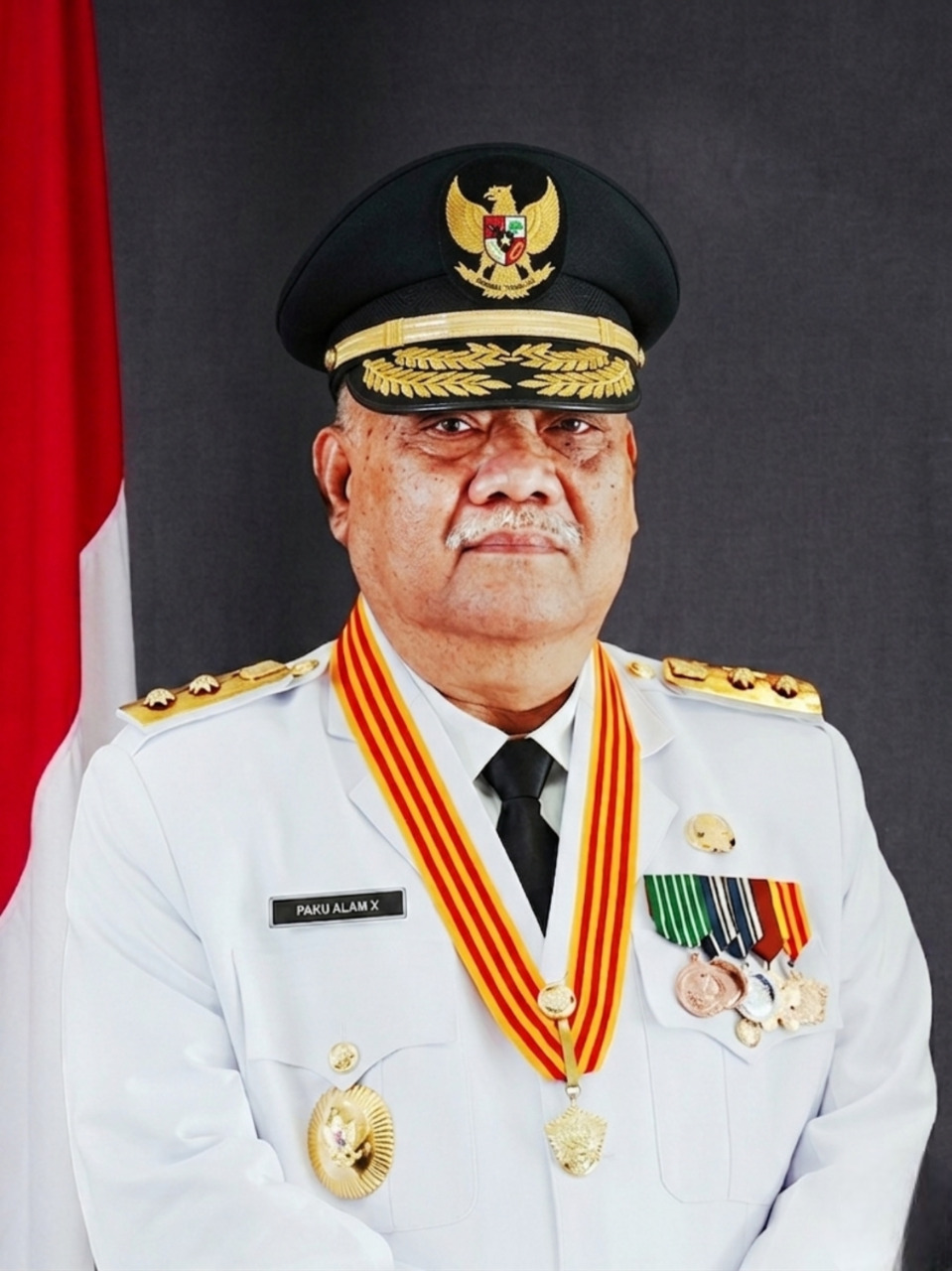
- Incumbent; Paku Alam X since 7 January 2016
- Style: His Grace
- Residence: Pura Pakualaman, Yogyakarta
- Seat: Special Region of Yogyakarta, Indonesia
- Appointer: Hereditary succession
- Term length: Life tenure
- Formation: 17 March 1813
- First holder: Paku Alam I

The Duke of Pakualaman (Indonesian: Adipati Pakualaman) is the hereditary ruler of the Pakualaman, a Javanese principality located within the Special Region of Yogyakarta in Indonesia. The position was established in 1813 during the British administration of Java under Thomas Stamford Raffles.

The Pakualaman forms part of the traditional monarchical structure of Yogyakarta, alongside the Yogyakarta Sultanate. In the modern Indonesian state, the Duke of Pakualaman traditionally serves as Vice Governor of the Special Region of Yogyakarta.

== History ==
The Pakualaman principality was founded on 17 March 1813 during the British interregnum in Java. At the time, the British administration sought to reorganize the political structure of central Java following conflicts within the Yogyakarta Sultanate and resistance against colonial influence.

Paku Alam I was installed as the first Prince, marking the formal establishment of Pakualaman as a semi-autonomous duchy under colonial oversight. The creation of Pakualaman paralleled earlier divisions such as the formation of the Yogyakarta Sultanate itself under the 1755 Treaty of Giyanti.

Throughout the 19th and early 20th centuries, the Pakualaman remained a minor but symbolically significant polity within the Dutch East Indies. Its rulers maintained cultural and administrative roles while operating under colonial supervision.

Following the Indonesian National Revolution (1945–1949), Pakualaman became integrated into the Republic of Indonesia. Alongside the Yogyakarta Sultanate, it was granted special status within the newly formed Special Region of Yogyakarta.

== Role and functions ==
The Prince of Pakualaman holds a dual role:

- As a traditional monarch, the Duke serves as a cultural and ceremonial leader within Javanese society.
- As part of Indonesia's administrative system, the Duke traditionally occupies the position of Vice Governor of the Special Region of Yogyakarta.

== List of Dukes of Pakualaman ==
No.	Portraits	Name	Reign	Notes
1		Paku Alam I	1813–1829	Founder of Pakualaman
2		Paku Alam II	1829–1858	
3		Paku Alam III	1858–1864	
4		Paku Alam IV	1864–1878	
5		Paku Alam V	1878–1900	
6		Paku Alam VI	1900–1902	
7		Paku Alam VII	1903–1937	
8		Paku Alam VIII	1937–1998	Vice Governor of Yogyakarta
9		Paku Alam IX	1998–2015	
10		Paku Alam X	2016–present	Incumbent

== See also ==
- Pakualaman
- Yogyakarta Sultanate
- Special Region of Yogyakarta
- Treaty of Giyanti
