= Pakualaman Mosque =

Mosque in Yogyakarta, Indonesia

Coordinates: 7°48′04″S 110°22′31″E

Religion
- Affiliation: Islam
- Province: Special Region of Yogyakarta

Location
- Location: Yogyakarta, Indonesia
- Country: Indonesia
- Interactive map of Pakualaman Mosque

Architecture
- Type: Mosque
- Style: Javanese vernacular

The Pakualaman Great Mosque (Indonesian: Masjid Besar Pakualaman) is a Javanese mosque located in Kauman, Yogyakarta, Indonesia. It is the royal mosque of the Pakualaman.

== History ==
The mosque was built between 1831 and 1850, following the end of the Java War. Its construction was initiated by KRT Natadiningrat, who later became Paku Alam II. The project was carried out under the direction of BRM Surjadi, who later became Paku Alam I before his death in 1829. Even though Surjadi died before the mosque's completion, his vision played a significant role in shaping the design and purpose of the mosque.

Located in the southwest corner of the Pakualaman palace complex, the mosque served both as a religious center and a symbol of royal authority. Arabic and Javanese inscriptions, which provide historical context about the mosque’s founding, are present and continue to be preserved as cultural artifacts.

== Architecture ==
The Pakualaman Great Mosque is a fine example of traditional Javanese architecture. Originally, its layout was rectangular. The roof, designed to resemble a crown, reflects the royal status of the mosque. Inside the main prayer hall, there is a designated prayer space for the king. This special section is made of finely crafted wood and features decorative floral patterns along with Arabic calligraphy. It is also slightly elevated from the main floor, signifying its importance.

During restoration efforts, two inscriptions in Arabic and two in Javanese were discovered. These have since been relocated and mounted on the front veranda wall to ensure their preservation and visibility.

In a later development, a terrace was added to the east side of the mosque during the reign of Paku Alam VIII. This addition served both functional and aesthetic purposes. However, in 2017, the terrace was dismantled as part of a conservation project. The flooring tiles were replaced with ones that resemble the original design, and the roof above that section was adjusted to be lower than the main prayer hall's roof, aligning more closely with the mosque’s original structure.

== See also ==
- List of mosques in Indonesia
