= Legiun Pakualaman =

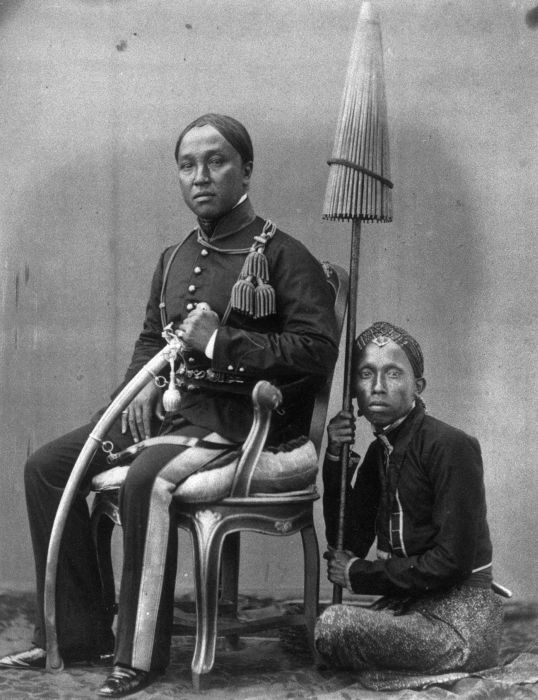
Paku Alam IV (1841-1878), in military uniform as titular leader of the Legiun Pakualaman

The Legiun Pakualaman (Pakualaman's Legion) was an army corps of the Pakualaman princely state of Yogyakarta, formed in 1813 during the reign of Paku Alam I. The force was initially formed not only as a symbol of pride for the newly formed state, but also as a reserve force for the British, and later also the Dutch, colonial governments.

The legion was trained with a variety of European style warfare tactics, weaponry, and military ranks. The training was provided by European instructors, and the troop members received stipend from the colonial government. Members of the legion were recruited from the state residents, with the Pakualaman nobles as the legion commanders with the rank of Major or Colonel. The reigning dukes of Paku Alam automatically hold the rank of titular Colonel or Lieutenant Colonel.

At the beginning and during the British colonial rule, the legion troops consisted of 100 light horsemen (dragoon). During the Dutch colonial rule, the legion troops composition changed into 50 horsemen and 100 infantry troops. The largest number of troops happened during the reign of Paku Alam IV, which in 1870 enlarged it into a company of cavalry and a half battalion of infantry troops.

The legion participated in the Aceh War, but it did not meet the expectations of the Dutch. The legion was dissolved by the Dutch East Indies government in 1892, during the reign of Paku Alam V, by the Gouvernement Besluit (government decree) No. 12, of August 19, 1891. The younger and healthy legion members were offered to join the Dutch East Indies Army (KNIL), while those who were not accepted received the offer to become abdi dalem punakawan (commoner courtiers) at the Pakualaman palace.

After 48 years passed, in 1940 a second Legiun Pakualaman was formed, which served as a guarding army of the Pakualaman palace, but it was disbanded again in 1942 as the Dutch East Indies surrendered to the Japanese colonial government.

== See also ==
- Pakualaman
- Legiun Mangkunegaran
