= Governor of the Special Region of Yogyakarta =

Governor of Special Region of Yogyakarta
- Gubernur Daerah Istimewa Yogyakarta ꦒꦸꦧꦼꦂꦤꦸꦂꦥꦤꦒꦫꦩꦶꦫꦸꦁꦒꦤ꧀ꦔꦪꦺꦴꦒꦾꦏꦂꦠ
- Coat of arms of Yogyakarta

- Flag of Yogyakarta (non-civil)

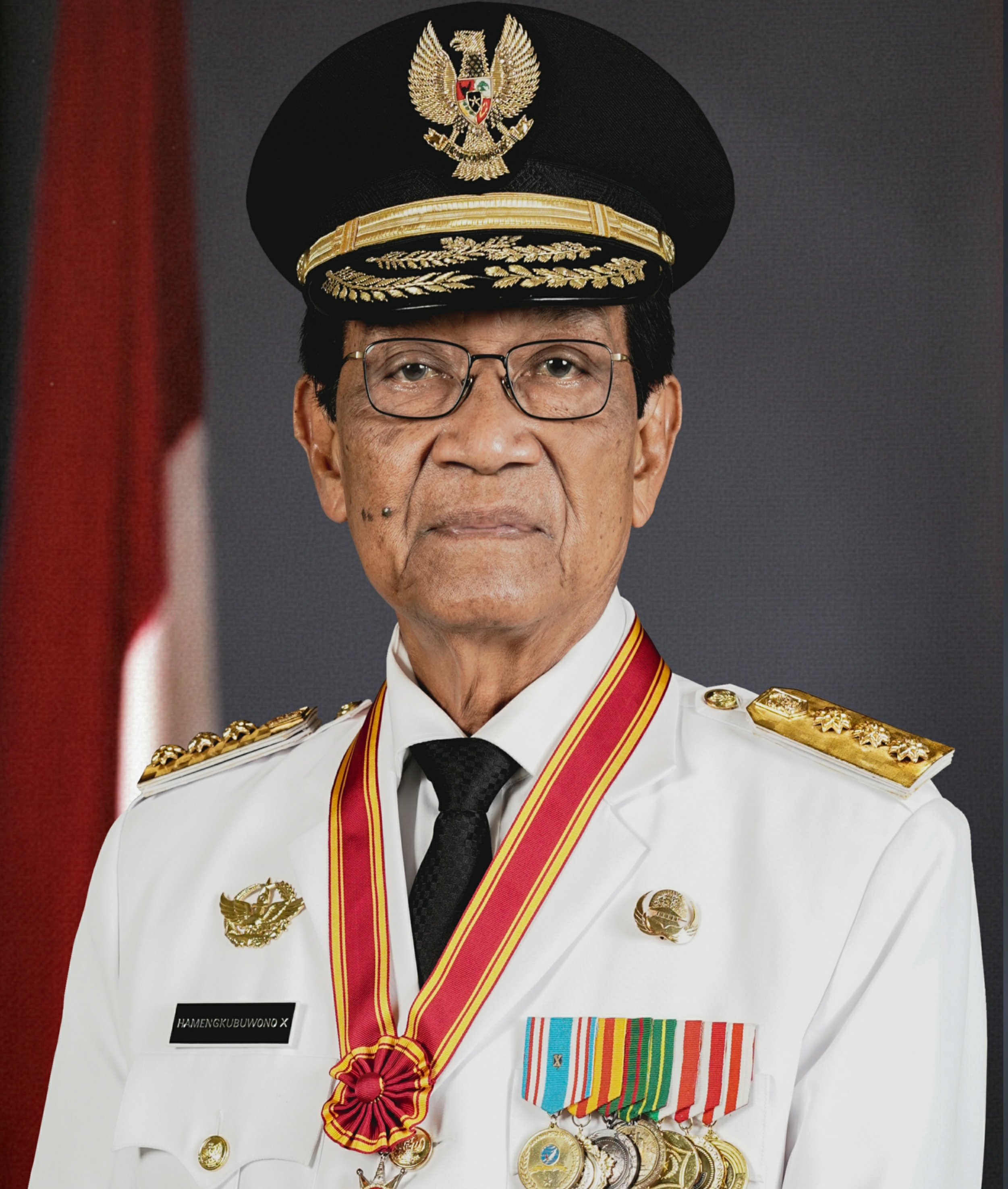
- Incumbent; Hamengkubuwono X, 10th Sri Sultan of Yogyakarta since 3 October 1998
- Special Region of Yogyakarta Provincial Government
- Style: The Honorable
- Type: Chief executive
- Status: Head of government
- Abbreviation: GOSROY (in English); Gub. DIY (in Indonesian)
- Residence: The Royal Palace of Yogyakarta
- Nominator: None
- Appointer: Hereditary (no election)
- Term length: No term limits
- Formation: 4 March 1950; 76 years ago
- First holder: Hamengkubuwono IX
- Deputy: Vice Governor of Yogyakarta
- Salary: Rp 3 million (US$17,947) per month
- Website: www.jogjaprov.go.id

The Governor of the Special Region of Yogyakarta (Indonesian: Gubernur Daerah Istimewa Yogyakarta) is the head of government of the Special Region of Yogyakarta, an autonomous region of Indonesia.

Unlike other provinces in Indonesia, the position of governor is traditionally held by the reigning Sultan of Yogyakarta, reflecting the region's unique monarchical system.

== History ==
The governance structure of the Special Region of Yogyakarta was established in the early years after independence through a charter issued in 1945 by President Sukarno, along with later laws including Law No. 22 of 1948, Law No. 3 of 1950, Law No. 1 of 1957, Law No. 18 of 1965, and Law No. 5 of 1974.

Under Law No. 22 of 1948, which also became the basis for Law No. 3 of 1950 on the formation of the Special Region of Yogyakarta, the Head and Deputy Head of the region were appointed by the President from hereditary ruling families who had governed the area before independence and continued to hold authority.

In practice, this meant that the reigning Sultan of Yogyakarta served as Head of the Special Region until 1988, while the reigning Paku Alam served as Deputy Head until 1998. The titles "Governor" and "Vice Governor" were introduced after Law No. 22 of 1999, while the basic system of leadership remained unchanged.

Based on Law No. 13 of 2012 on the Special Status of the Special Region of Yogyakarta, the Indonesian government formally recognized the reigning Sultan of Yogyakarta as the hereditary Governor and the reigning Paku Alam as the hereditary Vice Governor (Article 18 paragraph 1c). The term of office for both positions is five years per period (Article 25 paragraph 1), but without term limits (Article 25 paragraph 2), allowing the reigning monarch of each royal house to remain in office for life and be succeeded by the next ruler.

== List ==
Governor of the Special Region of Yogyakarta
No.	Portrait	Name	Term in office	Vice governor
1		Hamengkubuwono IX	4 March 1950 – 3 October 1988 (38 years, 214 days)	Paku Alam VIII (1950–1988)
2		Paku Alam VIII (Note: from the Duke of Pakualaman)	5 December 1988 – 11 September 1998 (9 years, 281 days)	Vacant
3		Hamengkubuwono X	3 October 1998 – present (27 years, 343 days)	Vacant
3		Hamengkubuwono X	3 October 1998 – present (27 years, 343 days)	Paku Alam IX (2003–2015)
3		Hamengkubuwono X	3 October 1998 – present (27 years, 343 days)	Paku Alam X (2016–present)

=== Acting ===
Portrait	Name	Term in office		Term	Definitive governor	Note
	Paku Alam VIII (Acting)	3 October 1988 – 5 December 1988	63 days	I	Hamengkubuwana IX	(Note: Paku Alam became Acting Governor from 3 October 1988 when Governor Hamengkubuwono IX died in office, and was definitively inaugurated on 5 December 1988)
	Soebekti Soenarto (Daily acting)	11 September 1998 – 3 October 1998	22 days	II	Paku Alam VIII	(Note: Soebekti Soenarto became Daily Acting Governor from 11 September 1998, replacing Governor Paku Alam VIII who died in office)
	Ichsanuri (Daily acting)	9 October 2012 – 10 October 2012	1 day	—	Hamengkubuwana X	(Note: Because the second extended term of office expired on October 9, 2012 at 23.59 WIB, the Ministry of Home Affairs appointed M. Ichsanuri, Secretary of the Special Region of Yogyakarta, as Acting Governor until the Governor was inaugurated by the President of Indonesia.)

== Gallery ==
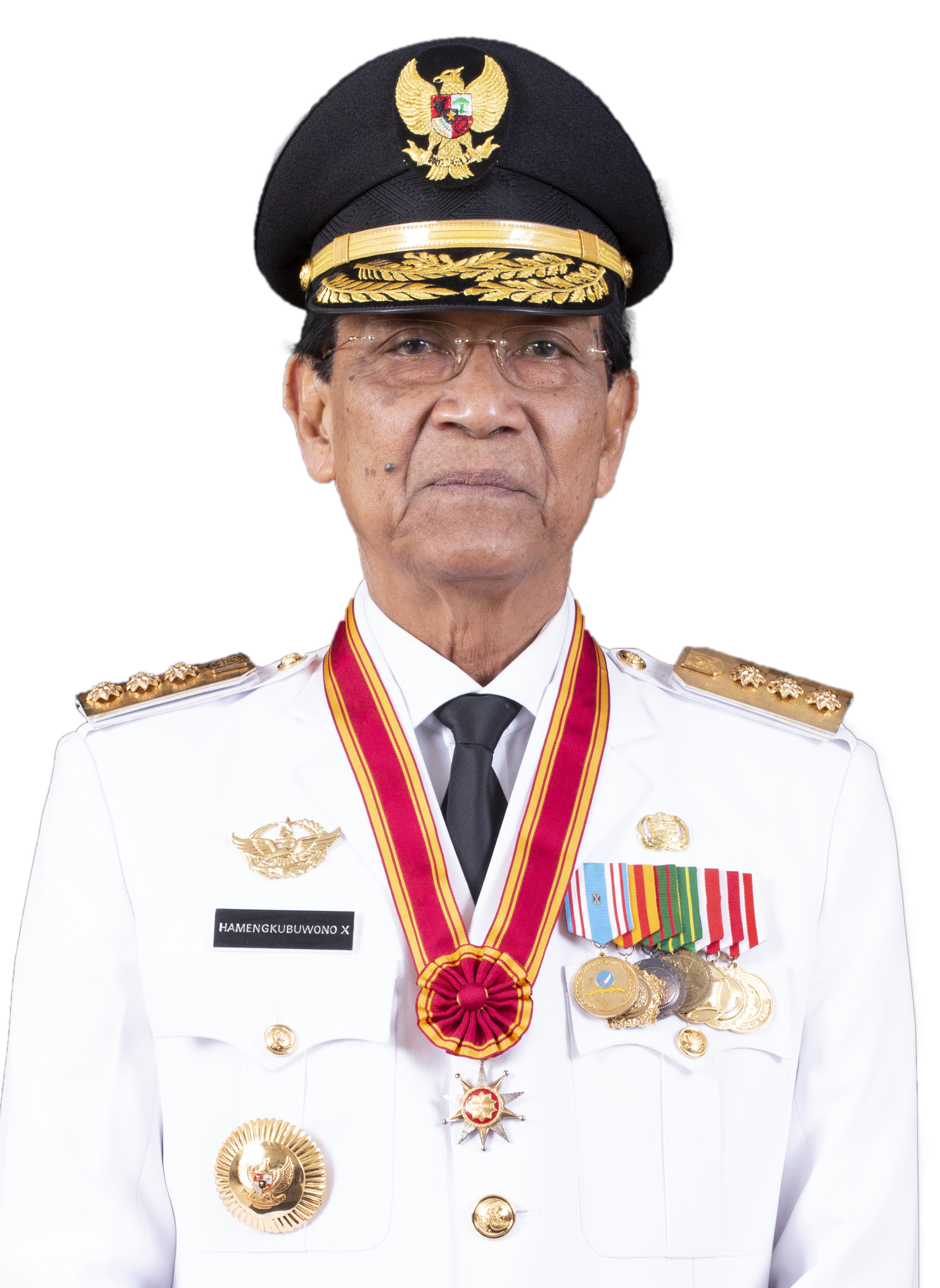
Hamengkubawana X (2020)

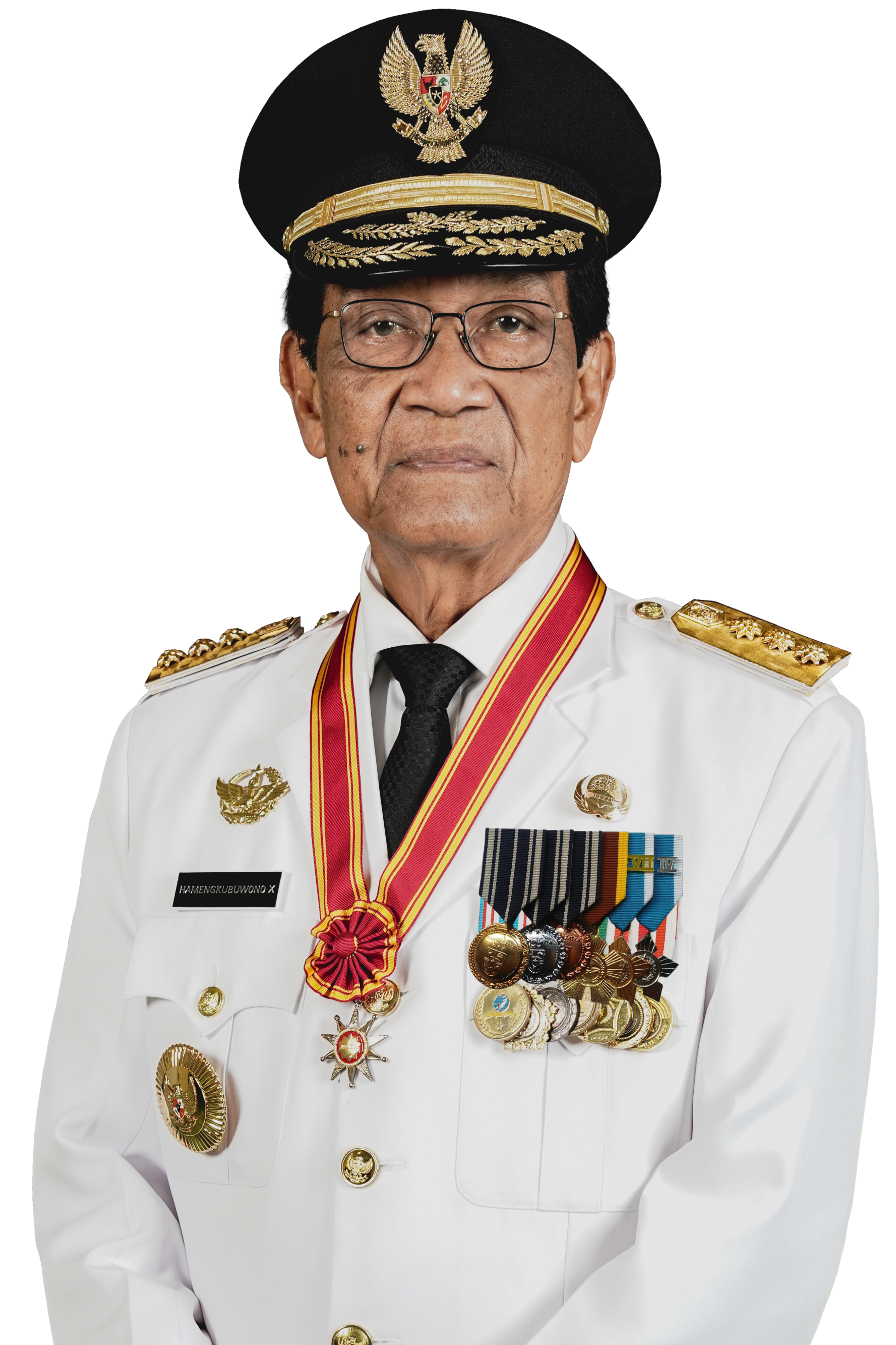
Hamengkubawana X (2022)

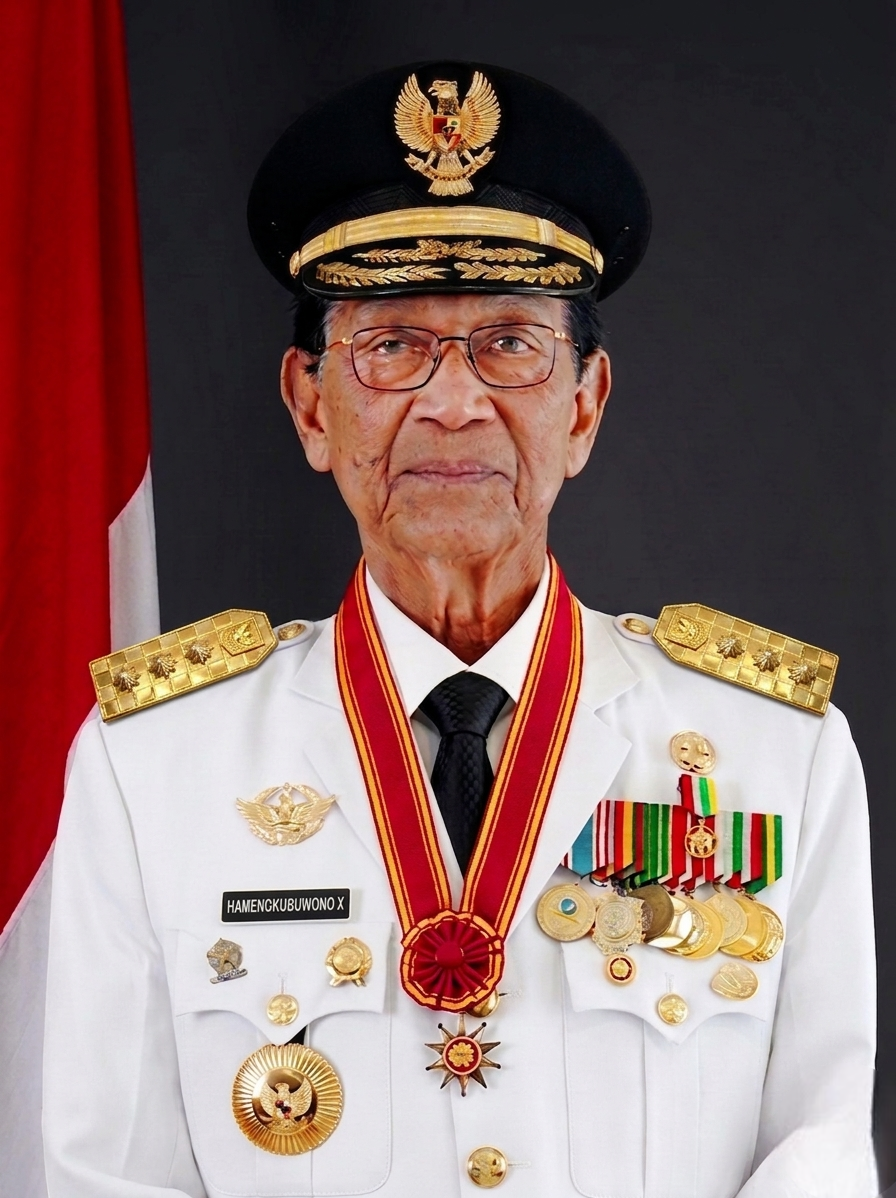
Hamengkubuwana X (2024)
