= Paku Alam I =

Duke of Pakualaman, Yogyakarta

- His Grace The Duke of Pakualaman

1st Duke of Pakualaman
- Reign: 1813 – 1829
- Successor: Paku Alam II
- Born: 21 March 1764
- Died: 1829 (aged 64–65); Pura Pakualaman, Yogyakarta Sultanate
- Issue: Paku Alam II
- House: Mataram
- Father: Hamengkubuwana I
- Mother: Bendara Raden Ayu Srenggara

Paku Alam I, 1st Duke of Pakualaman originally known as Bendara Pangeran Harya Natakusuma, was the first Prince (Pangeran Adipati) of Pakualaman, rewarded for helping the British quell the conflict in Yogyakarta in June 1812. Pakualaman became a small hereditary Principality within the Sultanate of Yogyakarta, as a mirror-image of the Principality of Mangkunegaran within the territory of the Susuhunanate of Surakarta. Paku Alam I ruled from 1812 to 1829 and was buried at Kota Gede.

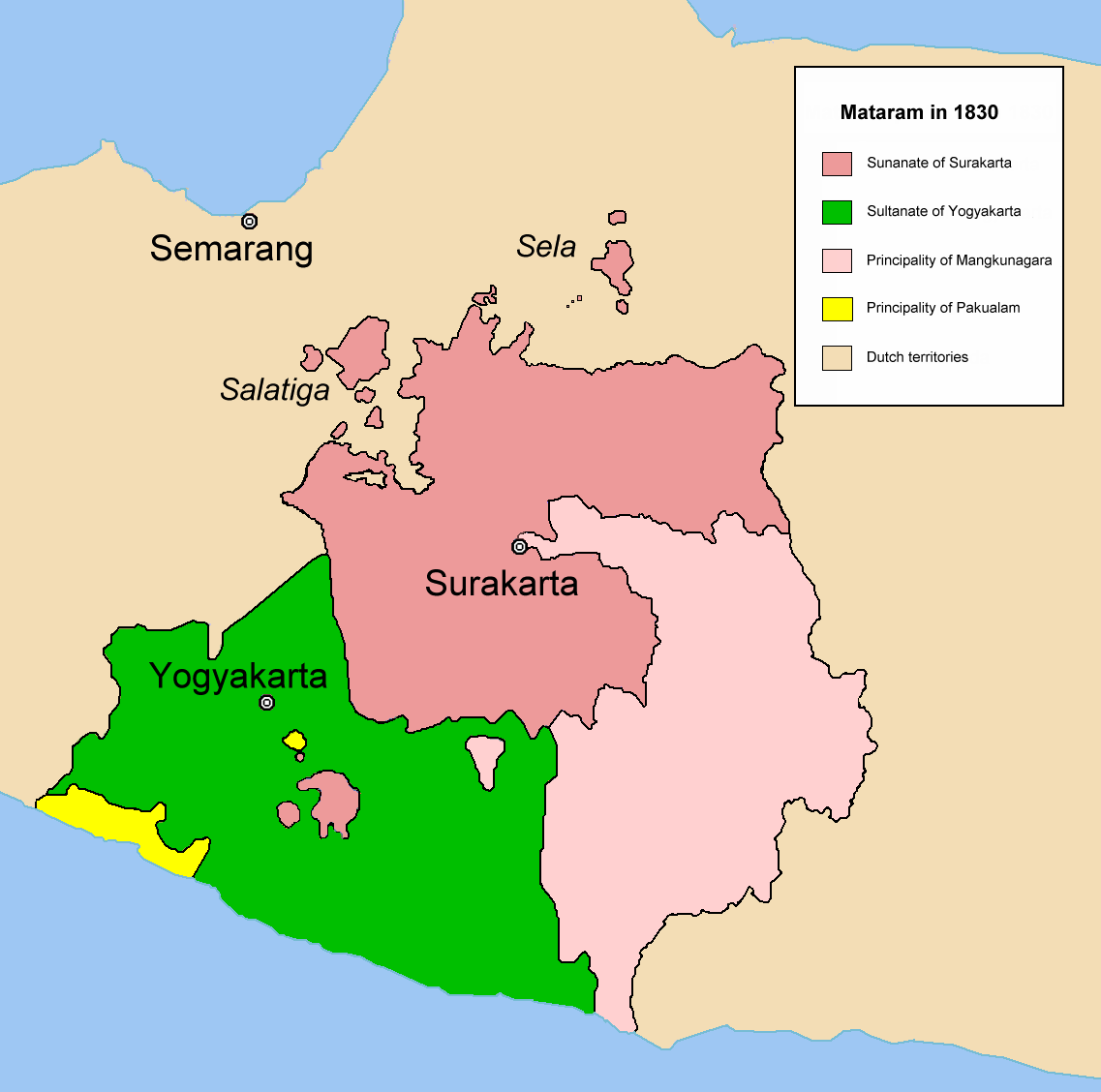
Location of Pakualaman within the Yogyakarta Sultanate.

== Subsequent list of rulers ==
- Paku Alam II, 1829 – 1858
- Paku Alam III, 1858 – 1864
- Paku Alam IV, 1864 – 1878
- Paku Alam V, 1878 – 1900
- Paku Alam VI, 1901 – 1902
- Paku Alam VII, 1903 – 1938
- Paku Alam VIII, 1938 – 1999
- Paku Alam IX, 1999 – 2015
- Paku Alam X, 2016 –

== Notes ==
Preceded by New Title	Prince of Pakualaman; 1812–1829	Succeeded by Paku Alam II
