= Paku Alam II =

Prince of Paku Alam, Yogyakarta

- His Grace The Duke of Pakualaman
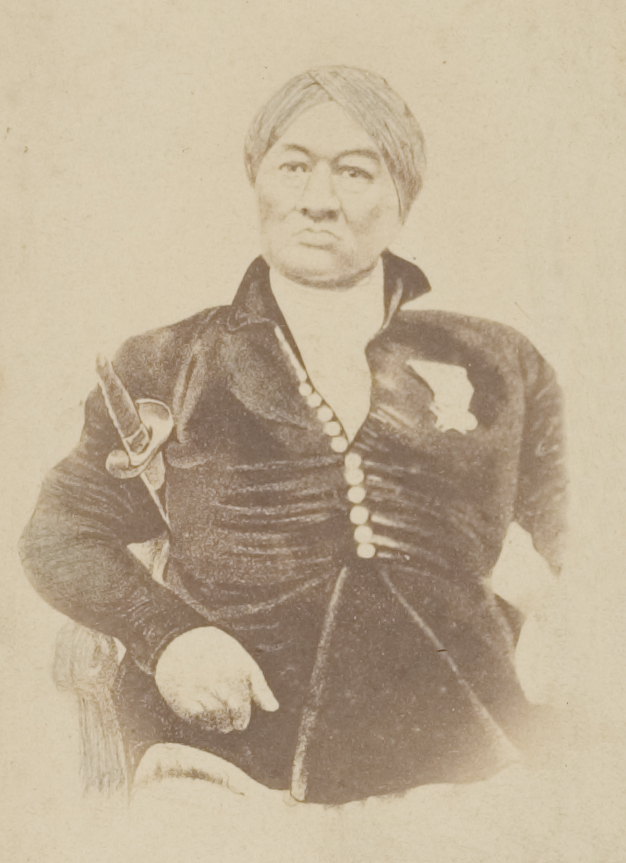

2nd Duke of Pakualaman
- Reign: 1829 – 1858
- Predecessor: Paku Alam I
- Successor: Paku Alam III
- Born: June 25, 1786
- Died: 23 July 1858 (aged 72)
- Spouse: Gusti Kanjeng Ratu Hayu of Yogyakarta (m. 1805)
- Issue more...: Kanjeng Pangeran Harya Nataningprang; Paku Alam III; Paku Alam V
- House: Mataram
- Father: Paku Alam I

Paku Alam II, 2nd Duke of Pakualaman was a between 1829 and 1858. It is a small hereditary principality within the Sultanate of Yogyakarta, as a mirror-image of the Duchy of Mangkunegaran in the territory of the Susuhunanate of Surakarta

The son of Paku Alam I, Paku Alam II was buried at Kota Gede.

== Personal life ==
His primary consort, Gusti Kanjeng Ratu Hayu, was a Yogyakarta princess, daughter of Hamengkubuwana II by his third queen consort, Gusti Kanjeng Ratu Kencana Wulan. She was the mother of four sons, including Paku Alam III.

== Family ==
He had at least several sons and daughters, listed below.

- Gusti Kanjeng Ratu Hayu
  - Kanjeng Pangeran Harya Suryaatmaja, changed to Kanjeng Pangeran Harya Suryaningrat
  - Bendara Raden Ayu Rangga Prawiradirja
  - Kanjeng Pangeran Harya Nataningprang
  - Kanjeng Pangeran Harya Sasraningrat, later Kanjeng Gusti Pangeran Adipati Arya Surya Sasraningrat, unofficially Paku Alam III
- Resminingdyah
  - Kanjeng Pangeran Harya Suryadilaga, later Kanjeng Gusti Pangeran Adipati Arya Paku Alam V

== Maps ==
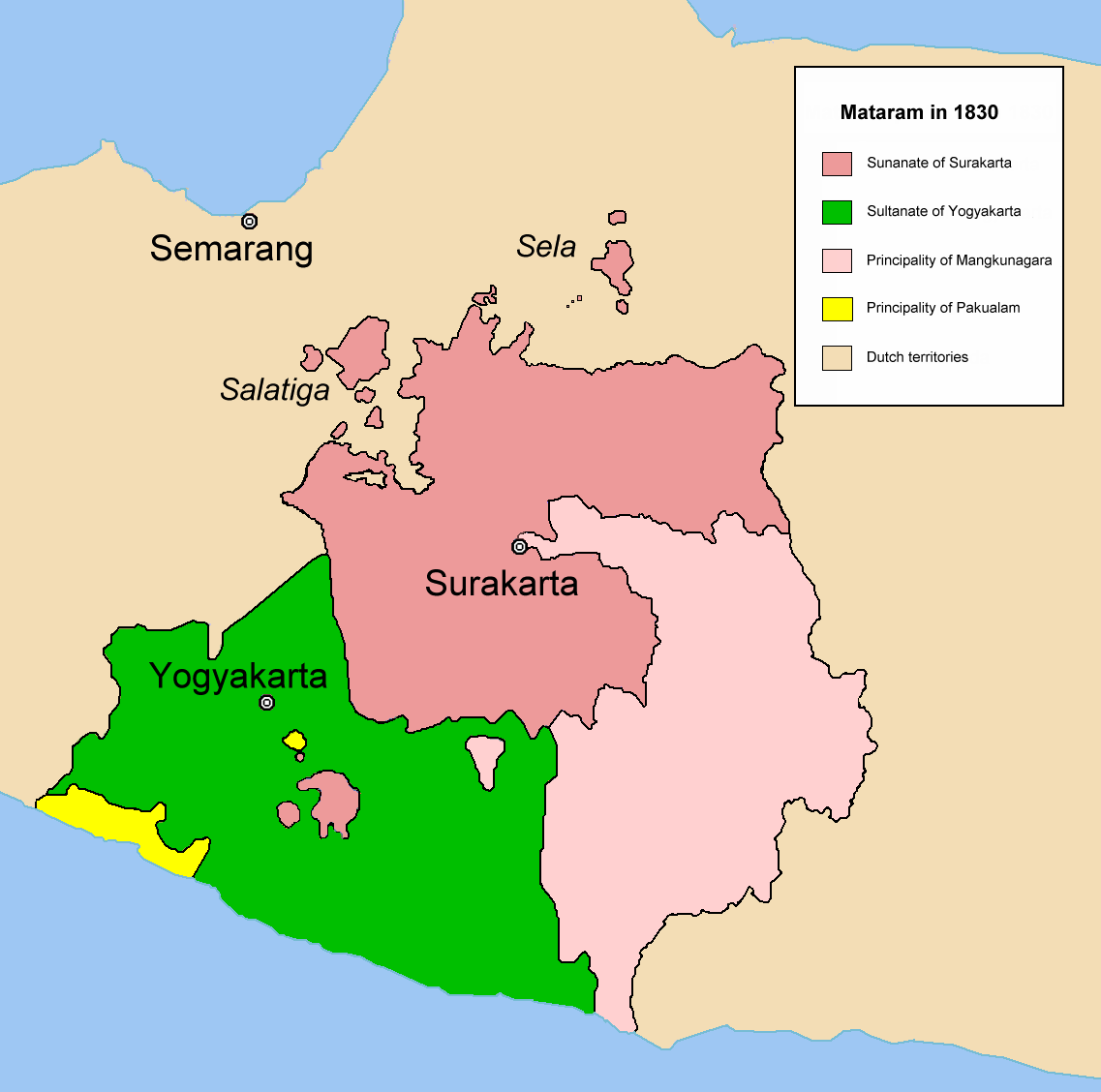
Location of Pakualaman within the Yogyakarta Sultanate.

== Subsequent list of rulers ==
- Paku Alam III, 1858 – 1864
- Paku Alam IV, 1864 – 1878
- Paku Alam V, 1878 – 1900
- Paku Alam VI, 1901 – 1902
- Paku Alam VII, 1903 – 1938
- Paku Alam VIII, 1938 – 1999
- Paku Alam IX, 1999 – 2015
- Paku Alam X, 2016 –

== Family history ==
- Pakualam VI Gusti Kanjeng Bandara Raden Ayu Adipati. VI; Jayeng Untara Raden; Hudayana Kawanitan (1977), Badad Pakualaman, s.n
- Jayeng Untara Raden; Jurumartani, B. R. A; Untara, Jayeng Raden; Raden Ayu Adipati, Babad Paku Alaman, yasa Swargi G.K.B.R.A.A. Paku Alam VI, wondene ings kang kedawuhan nyerat R. Jayeng Unis ara, s.n

== Notes ==
Preceded by Paku Alam I	Duke of Pakualaman; 1829–1858	Succeeded by Paku Alam III
