= Kingdoms of Sunda =

Monarchies of the Sundanese region prior to the establishment of Indonesia

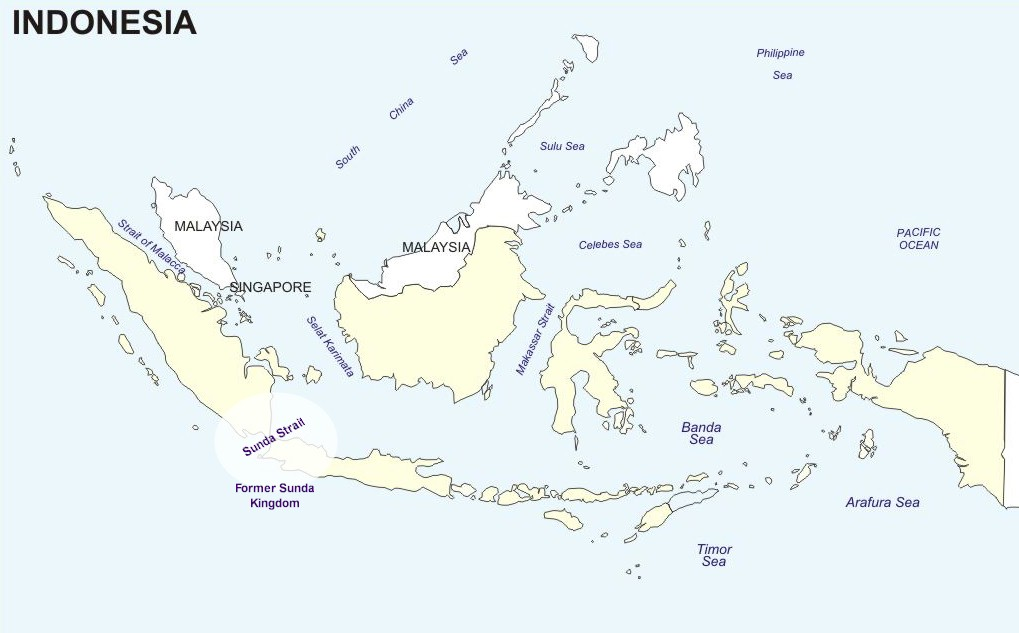
Former Sunda Kingdom

Kingdoms of Sunda refers to the monarchies of the Sundanese region prior to the establishment of Indonesia in 1945 AD. The history includes several eras:

1. Tarumanagara (Capital at Chandrabhaga/Bekasi & Sundapura)
2. The Sunda Kingdom and Galuh Kingdom (or Sunda-Galuh with capital at Pakuan Pajajaran; Saunggalah and Kawali)
3. Kingdom of Sumedang Larang, The Sultanate of Banten & The Sultanate of Cirebon

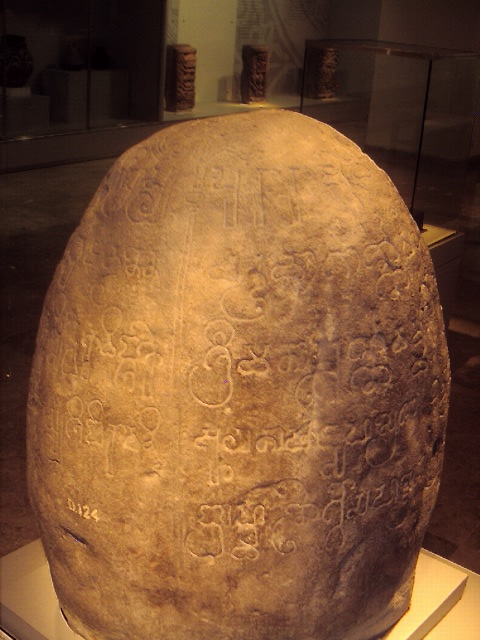
1600-year-old stone inscription from the era of Purnawarman, king of Tarumanagara, founded in Tugu sub-district of Jakarta.

== Tarumanagara ==
The heyday of the Tarumanagara Kingdom was between the fourth and seventh centuries. The historical record of the kingdom is a sketchy account by a Chinese traveler and several rock inscriptions discovered in the western part of Java island. These sources agree that the most powerful king of Tarumanegara was Purnavarman, who conquered neighbouring countries.

== Sunda Kingdom (United Kingdom of Sunda and Galuh) ==
The United Kingdom of Sunda and Galuh was a kingdom in West Java and western part of Central Java territory which emerged as a unification of the Sunda kingdom and the Galuh kingdom. The two kingdoms themselves were a result of the division of the former Tarumanagara kingdom. This kingdom was often just called the Sunda Kingdom based on historical primary resources such as stone inscriptions and old literature.

The area covered by the Sunda kingdom until early in the 16th century

Based on the travel records of Prince Bujangga Manik, a Hindu Sundanese monk who visited all of the holy Hindu sites in Java and Bali islands at the beginning of the sixteenth century AD, in his lontar manuscripts (which have been saved in the Bodleian Library of Oxford University of England since the 16th century), the border of the Sunda kingdom in the west is the Sunda Strait; in the east is the Cipamali River (present day Brebes River); and Serayu River in Central Java Province.

Historical record

The earliest time of a reference to the name Sunda being used to identify a kingdom, is written on the Prasasti Kebon Kopi II stone inscription of 458 Saka (536 AD) and copperplate letters of the fifteenth century with royal instructions telling the existence of the Sunda kingdom. Another reference to the kingdom is the Sanghiyang Tapak inscriptions. There are also certain Chinese sources concerning the Sunda kingdom; the first source is a report from Chu-fan-chi from 1225 AD and the second source is the Chinese book "shun-feng hsiang-sung" from about 1430 AD. European explorers also report the existence of the Sunda kingdom. One of the explorers was Tomé Pires from Portugal. Tomé Pires, in his report “Summa Oriental (1513–1515)”, wrote about his journey to the Sunda kingdom. Diogo do Couto also wrote that the Sunda kingdom is thriving and abundant; it lies between Java and Sumatra, having between it and the latter the Straits of Sunda. Besides that, the Portuguese made a peace treaty with the Sunda kingdom in 1522 AD. This treaty is better known as the Luso Sundanese Treaty of Sunda Kalapa. Henrique Leme erected a padrão to memorialize the treaty.

In the early sixteenth century AD, the kingdom was divided into three smaller kingdoms, including the Sultanate of Banten and the Sultanate of Cirebon. But many historical resources tell the existence of the third kingdom in south east of West Java, i.e. the Sumedanglarang Kingdom.

== Sultanate of Banten ==
In 1524/1525, Sunan Gunung Jati from Cirebon together with Demak Sultanate armies seized the port of Banten from the control of the Sunda kingdom, and established The Sultanate of Banten affiliating with the Demak Sultanate. Islam preachers have penetrated and introduced people to the peaceful way of life of Islam, and as a result many people in the region embraced Islam as their belief.

During 1552-1570, Maulana Hasanudin ruled as the first Sultan of Banten.

Reaching its golden age during the first half of the seventeenth century, the Sultanate of Banten lasted for 300 years (1526–1813 AD). The grandeur of this Sultanate has left us with a plethora of archaeological remains and historical records, allowing for numerous sources in retracing the history of the Sultanate of Banten.

== Sultanate of Cirebon ==
Sultanate of Cirebon (Indonesian: Kesultanan Cirebon, Sundanese: Kasultanan Cirebon) was a sultanate in Sunda land, founded in the sixteenth century. It is said to have been founded by Sunan Gunungjati, who also established the Sultanate of Banten.

== See also ==
- History of Indonesia
