= Paku Alam IV =

Ruler of Pakualaman

- His Grace The Duke of Pakualaman

4th Duke of Pakualaman
- Reign: 1864 – 1878
- Predecessor: Paku Alam III
- Successor: Paku Alam V
- Born: October 25, 1840; Yogyakarta Sultanate
- Died: 25 September 1878 (aged 37)
- Spouse: Gusti Kanjeng Ratu Hayu of Yogyakarta
- House: Mataram
- Father: Kanjeng Pangeran Harya Nataningprang
- Mother: Raden Ayu Nataningprang

Paku Alam IV, 4th Duke of Pakualaman between 1864 and 1878. Pakualaman (also written Paku Alaman) became a small hereditary Duchy within the Sultanate of Yogyakarta, as a mirror-image of Mangkunegaran in the territory of the Susuhunanate of Surakarta

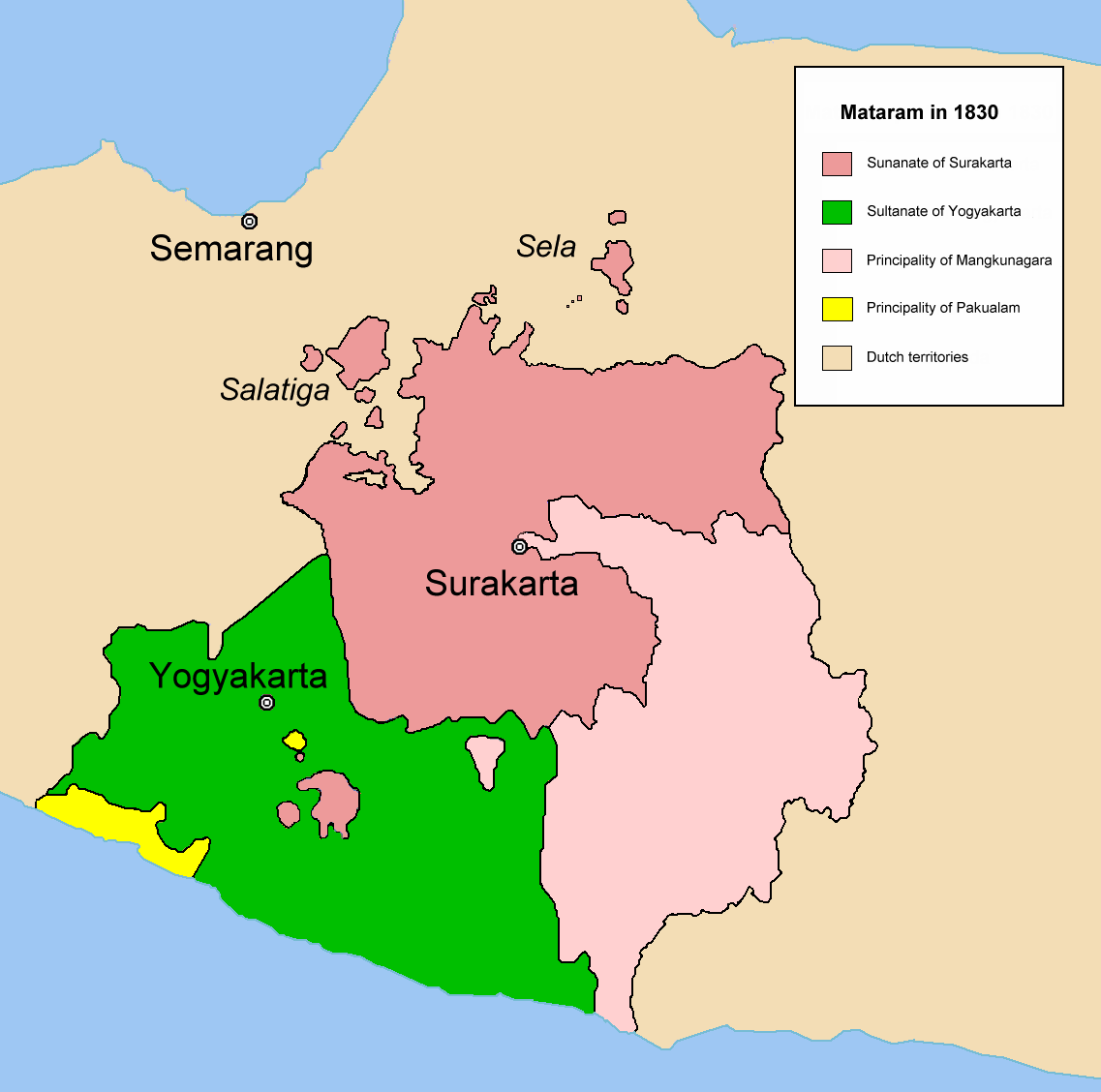
Location of Pakualaman within the Yogyakarta Sultanate.

The son of Paku Alam III, Paku Alam IV was the last Paku Alam to be buried at Kota Gede, his son Paku Alam V was the instigator of the royal burial ground at Girigondo

== Subsequent list of rulers ==
- Paku Alam V, 1878 – 1900
- Paku Alam VI, 1901 – 1902
- Paku Alam VII, 1903 – 1938
- Paku Alam VIII, 1938 – 1999
- Paku Alam IX, 1999 — 2015

== Family history ==
- Pakualam VI Gusti Kanjeng Bandara Raden Ayu Adipati. VI; Jayeng Untara Raden; Hudayana Kawanitan (1977), Badad Pakualaman, s.n
- Jayeng Untara Raden; Jurumartani, B. R. A; Untara, Jayeng Raden; Raden Ayu Adipati, Babad Paku Alaman, yasa Swargi G.K.B.R.A.A. Paku Alam VI, wondene ings kang kedawuhan nyerat R. Jayeng Unis ara, s.n

== Notes ==
Preceded by Paku Alam III	Duke of Pakualaman; 1864–1878	Succeeded by Paku Alam V
