= HBS =

HBS may refer to:

== Education ==
- Harvard Business School, in Boston, Massachusetts, United States
- Henley Business School of the University of Reading
- Henrietta Barnett School, in London, England
- Hitchin Boys' School, in Hertfordshire, England
- Hogere Burgerschool, a defunct Dutch secondary school type

== Language ==
- hbs, ISO 639-3 code for Serbo-Croatian

== Music ==
- Her Bright Skies, a Swedish post-hardcore band
- Historic Brass Society, an international music organization

== Other uses ==
- Hapoel Be'er Sheva F.C., an Israeli association football team
- Croatian Cycling Federation (Croatian: Hrvatski Biciklisticki Savez)
- Haemoglobin S (HbS)
- HBS Craeyenhout, a sports organization, The Hague, Netherlands
  - HBS Craeyenhout (football club), a Dutch association football team
- Heinrich Böll Foundation (German: Heinrich-Böll-Stiftung), a German political foundation
- Saline (medicine), HEPES-buffered Saline (HBS)
- Hexagonal bilayer silica
- Himanta Biswa Sarma, 15th Chief Minister of the Indian state of Assam
- Hoboken Shore Railroad, a defunct railway in New Jersey, US
- Honmon Butsuryū-shū, a Buddhist sect in Japan
- Hunan Broadcasting System, China
- Harebrained Schemes, a video game developer company.
- ISO 639-3 code for the Serbo-Croatian language
