= Paku Alam III =

Ruler of Pakualaman

- His Grace The Duke of Pakualaman
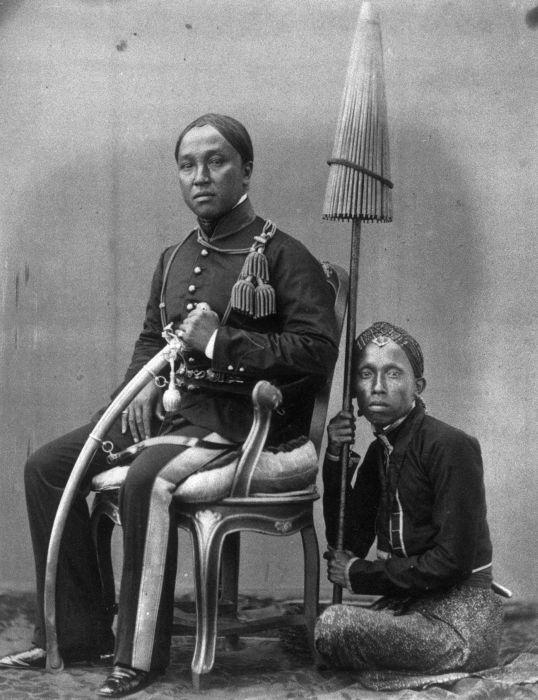

3rd Duke of Pakualaman
- Reign: 1858 – 1864
- Coronation: 29 December 1858
- Predecessor: Paku Alam II
- Successor: Paku Alam IV
- Born: December 20, 1827; Yogyakarta Sultanate
- Died: 17 October 1864 (aged 36); Yogyakarta Sultanate
- Spouse: Raden Ayu Adipati Surya Sastraningrat
- House: Mataram
- Father: Paku Alam II
- Mother: Gusti Kanjeng Ratu Hayu of Yogyakarta

Prince Paku Alam III, 3rd Duke of Pakualaman between 1858 and 1864, making him the second shortest reigning Paku Alam after Paku Alam VI.

== Early life ==
He was a son of Paku Alam II by his primary wife, Gusti Kanjeng Ratu Hayu, daughter of Hamengkubuwana II.

In 1858, he succeeded his father by the title of Pangeran Adipati Lieutenant Colonel Commandant Surya Sasraningrat. His wife, Raden Ayu Adipati Sasraningrat, was a daughter of Bendara Pangeran Harya Puger, son of Hamengkubuwana II. He also wed a widow of his elder brother, Kanjeng Pangeran Harya Nataningprang. She was a daughter of Gusti Pangeran Harya Mangkudiningrat, a son of Hamengkubuwana II by his queen consort.

== Family ==
- Raden Ayu Adipati Surya Sasraningrat
  - Kanjeng Pangeran Harya Suryaningrat
  - Kanjeng Pangeran Harya Sasraningrat
- A widow of Kanjeng Pangeran Harya Nataningprang
  - Gusti Bendara Raden Ayu Adipati Paku Alam VI
    - Married Kanjeng Gusti Pangeran Adipati Arya Paku Alam VI
- Unknown concubine(s)
  - Kanjeng Pangeran Harya Purwasaputra
  - Raden Mas Harya Suryaudaya
  - Raden Mas Harya Suryakusuma
  - Raden Ayu Natataruna
  - Raden Ayu Natadirja

Notable Descendants

- Raden Mas Suwardi Suryaningrat
  son of Kanjeng Pangeran Harya Suryaningrat, known as Ki Hadjar Dewantara
  - Married Raden Ajeng Sutartinah/Nyi Hadjar Dewantara, daughter of Kanjeng Pangeran Harya Sasraningrat

== Pakualaman ==
Pakualaman became a small hereditary Duchy within the Sultanate of Yogyakarta, as a mirror-image of Mangkunegaran in the territory of the Susuhunanate of Surakarta.

Paku Alam III was considered to be an enthusiastic author and literary patron.

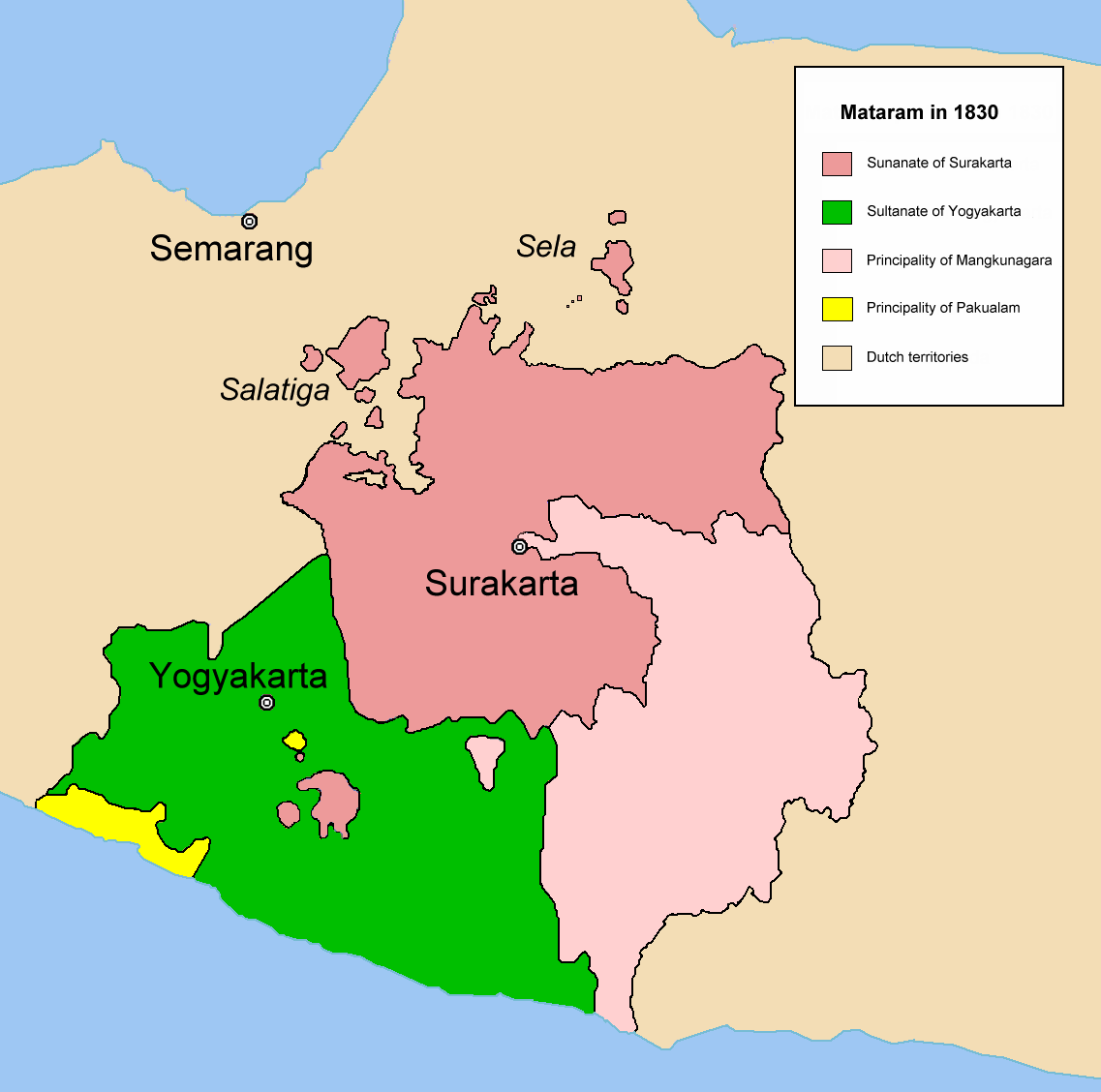
Location of Pakualaman within the Yogyakarta Sultanate.

The son of Paku Alam II, Paku Alam III was buried at Kota Gede.

== Subsequent list of rulers ==
- Paku Alam IV, 1864 – 1878
- Paku Alam V, 1878 – 1900
- Paku Alam VI, 1901 – 1902
- Paku Alam VII, 1903 – 1938
- Paku Alam VIII, 1938 – 1999
- Paku Alam IX, 1999 – 2015
- Paku Alam X, 2015 – present

== Notes ==
Preceded by Paku Alam II	Duke of Pakualaman; 1858–1864	Succeeded by Paku Alam IV
