= Paku Alam V =

- His Grace The Duke of Pakualaman
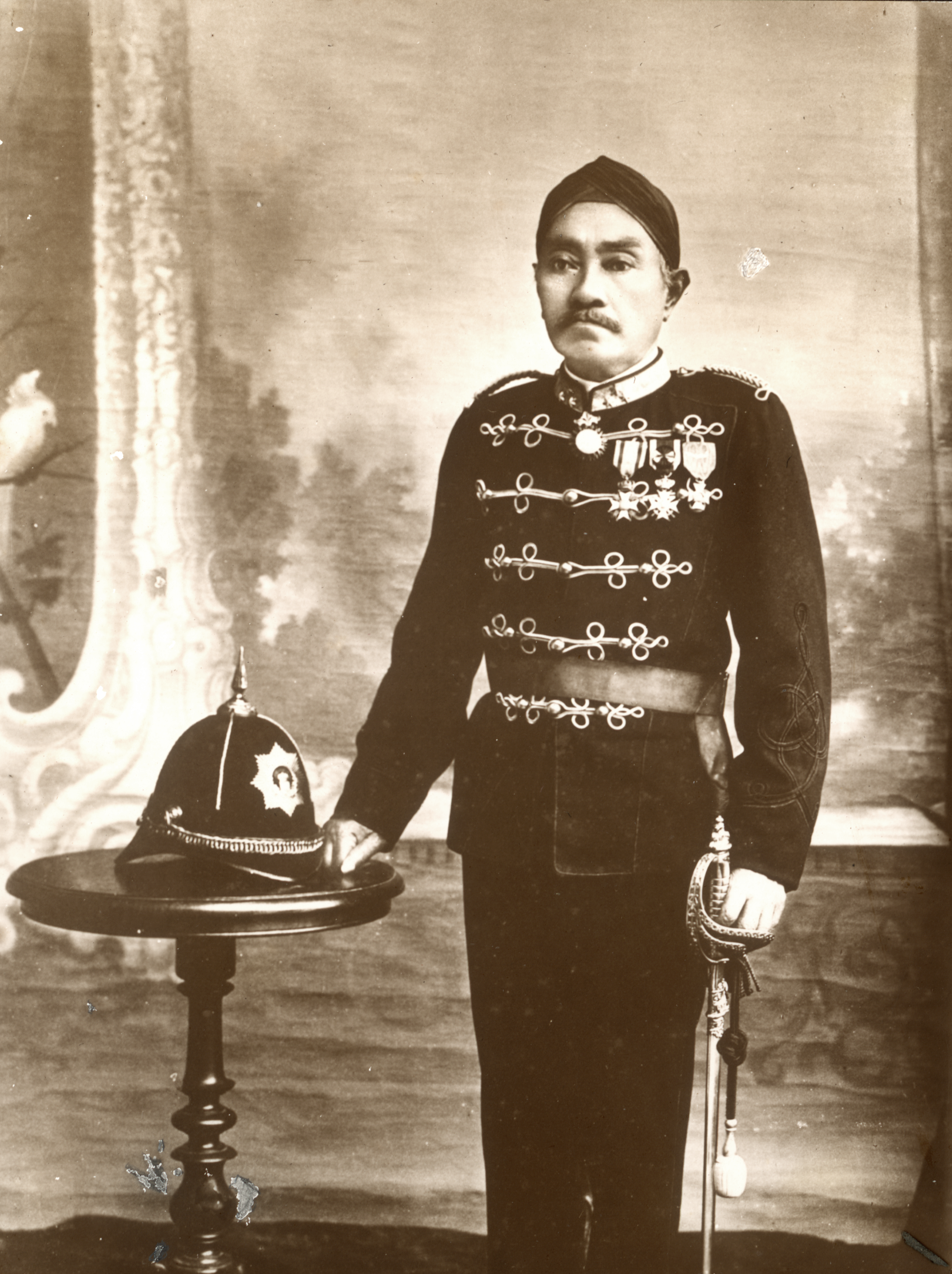

5th Duke of Pakualaman
- Reign: 1878 – 1900
- Coronation: 10 October 1878
- Predecessor: Paku Alam IV
- Successor: Paku Alam VI
- Born: June 23, 1833 (Akhad Wage 5 Sapar Wawu 1761 AJ)
- Died: 9 November 1900 (aged 67)
- Issue: Paku Alam VI
- House: Mataram
- Father: Paku Alam II
- Mother: Raden Ayu Resminingdia

Paku Alam V, 5th Duke of Pakualaman between 1878 and 1900. Pakualaman (also written Paku Alaman) became a small hereditary Duchy within the Yogyakarta Sultanate, as a mirror-image of Mangkunegaran in the territory of the Surakarta Sunanate.

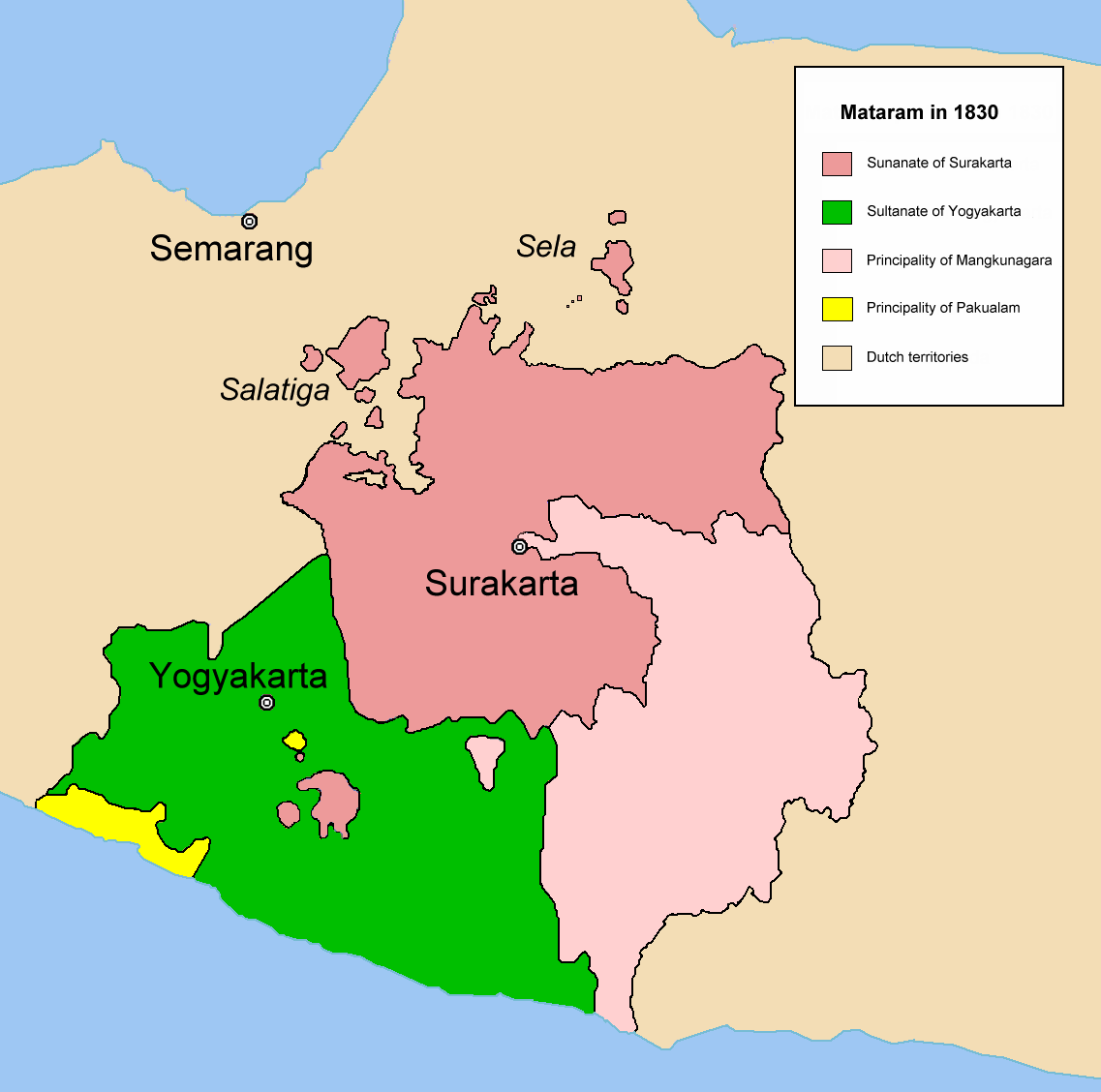
Location of Pakualaman within the Yogyakarta Sultanate.

== Early life ==
His younger name was Bendara Raden Mas Noto Wiloyo, a son of Paku Alam II born to his commoner-concubine, Resminingdyah. For unclear reasons, his mother was expelled from the palace and married off to Raden Riya Sosroamijoyo. Not long after marrying the Adipati's ex-concubine, he was installed as bupati patih.

At one point, he angered his father, Paku Alam II. His father banished him to Bugel, a village under Adikarto Regency (present-day merged with Kulon Progo Regency). There, he learned governance under the district leader, Ngabehi Reksodiwiryo and agriculture irrigation under Ngabehi Rekso Prayitno. Some time later, he wanted to visit his family in Pakualaman but doubt anyone would welcomed him.

Surprisingly he was warmly welcomed by his elder half-brother born to his father's primary consort, Bendara Raden Mas Harya Sasraningrat. Although this act angered the elder prince, Kanjeng Pangeran Harya Nataningprang, Sasraningrat defend him from their father and brother anger. And finally, Paku Alam II accepted his return.

Nataningprang who was already prepared as heir apparent died earlier. As a result, after Paku Alam II's died, he was succeeded his younger consort-born son, Sasraningrat, under the name of Kanjeng Gusti Pangeran Adipati Arya Surya Sasraningrat (unofficially Paku Alam III). Paku Alam III died six years later, his two consort-born son wasn't eligible to succeed as Suryaningrat had poor eyesight and Sasraningrat was too young at that time. He was succeeded by a son of the late Nataningprang, born to his primary consort who also took the same regnal name of Kanjeng Gusti Pangeran Adipati Surya Sasraningrat (unofficially Paku Alam IV). Notowiloyo's time came when his nephew, Paku Alam IV, passed away in 1878. He was appointed as the Duke of Pakualaman by the princely title of Kanjeng Gusti Pangeran Adipati Arya Prabu Suryadilaga, and later Kanjeng Gusti Pangeran Adipati Arya Paku Alam V.

== Personal life ==
He had two royal consorts. His first wife was still a close relative, a daughter of Raden Ayu Jayeng Irawan, primary consort to Raden Mas Tumenggung Jayeng Irawan, who served as the patih in Pakualaman. She was the mother of Paku Alam VI. His second wife was a daughter of Gusti Pangeran Harya Mangkudiningrat, son of Hamengkubuwono II by his queen consort, Gusti Kanjeng Ratu Hemas. She was the widow of his two brothers, Kanjeng Pangeran Harya Nataningprang and Paku Alam III.

According to an almanac dated 1892, he was recorded had two sons : Kanjeng Pangeran Harya Natakusuma and Kanjeng Pangeran Harya Natadirja. It was stated in the later almanac issued in 1911 that the two sons born to his primary consort.

== Family ==
These following lists were based on an almanac published in 1911.

- Gusti Bendara Raden Ayu Adipati Paku Alam V
  - Kanjeng Pangeran Harya Natakusuma, later Kanjeng Gusti Pangeran Adipati Arya Paku Alam VI
  - Kanjeng Pangeran Harya Natadirja
- Concubine(s)
  - Bendara Raden Mas Harya Nataatmadja
  - Kanjeng Bendara Raden Ayu Jayêngarja
  - Bendara Raden Ayu Suryakusuma
  - Bendara Raden Ayu Natawinata
  - Bendara Raden Ajeng Sumiyati
  - Bendara Raden Ajeng Murkatinah
  - Bendara Raden Mas Harya Suryaputra
  - Bendara Raden Mas Harya Natawirya
  - Bendara Raden Mas Harya Suryaatmaja
  - Bendara Raden Ajeng Suti
  - Bendara Raden Ajeng Mursih
  - Bendara Raden Ajeng Akatmiral
  - Bendara Raden Mas Natasmara

However, compared to older source issued in 1902, there are forgotten name on the lists, including :

- Raden Mas Sumiyada
- Raden Mas Konta
- Raden Ajeng Sumartijah
- Raden Ajeng Sumardinah
- Raden Mas Surtiaji
- Raden Ajeng Surini

The name lists above also could refer to the people included in 1911, but since they're mentioned without the mothers, they're most likely concubines-born.

== Death ==
Paku Alam V was the instigator of and buried at the graveyard in Girigondo.

== Subsequent list of rulers ==
- Paku Alam VI, 1901 – 1902
- Paku Alam VII, 1903 – 1938
- Paku Alam VIII, 1938 – 1999
- Paku Alam IX, 1999 — 2015
- Paku Alam X, 2015 –

== Family history ==
- Pakualam VI Gusti Kanjeng Bandara Raden Ayu Adipati. VI; Jayeng Untara Raden; Hudayana Kawanitan (1977), Badad Pakualaman, s.n
- Jayeng Untara Raden; Jurumartani, B. R. A; Untara, Jayeng Raden; Raden Ayu Adipati, Babad Paku Alaman, yasa Swargi G.K.B.R.A.A. Paku Alam VI, wondene ings kang kedawuhan nyerat R. Jayeng Unis ara, s.n

== Notes ==
| Preceded by Paku Alam IV | Duke of Pakualaman; 1878–1900 | Succeeded by Paku Alam VI |
