= Paku Alam VII =

Ruler of Pakualaman

- His Grace The Duke of Pakualaman
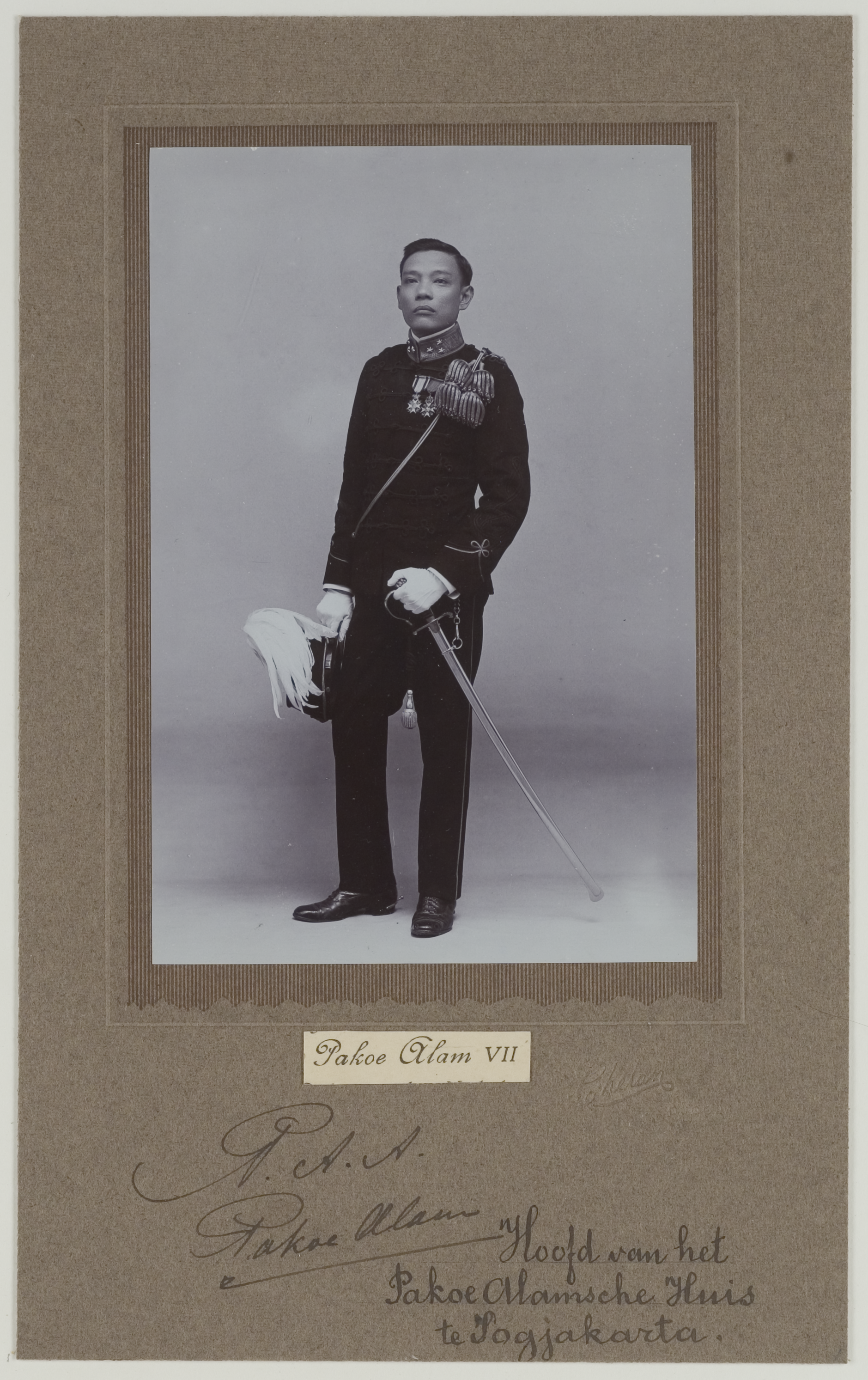
- Pakualam VII, circa 1910

7th Duke of Pakualaman
- Reign: 1903 - 1937
- Coronation: 16 October 1906
- Predecessor: Paku Alam VI
- Successor: Paku Alam VIII
- Born: Gusti Raden Mas Soerardjo; 9 December 1882; Duchy of Pakualaman, Dutch East Indies
- Died: 16 February 1937 (aged 54); Duchy of Pakualaman, Dutch East Indies
- Burial: Astana Giriganda, Kulon Progo
- Spouse: Gusti Bendara Raden Ayu Adipati Paku Alam VII (m. 1909)
- Issue: 7;include Paku Alam VIII
- House: Mataram
- Father: Paku Alam VI
- Mother: Gusti Bendara Raden Ayu Adipati Paku Alam VI

Paku Alam VII, 7th Duke of Pakualaman He acceded to the throne in 1903, and died in 1937.

Pakualaman (also written Paku Alaman) became a small hereditary Duchy within the Sultanate of Yogyakarta, as a mirror-image of Mangkunegaran in the territory of the Susuhunanate of Surakarta.

== Early life ==
He was a son of Paku Alam VI by his primary wife, Gusti Bendara Raden Ayu Adipati Paku Alam VI, born on December 9, 1882. His mother was a daughter of Paku Alam III and half-sister of Paku Alam IV.

By the time his father died in 1902, the Dutch appointed his maternal uncle, Kanjeng Pangeran Harya Sasraningrat, as the regent, since the heir was still a fourth-year student in HBS Semarang. Sasraningrat was unhappy, as he was the son of the late Paku Alam III; nevertheless, when his father and his elder cousin, Paku Alam IV, died, he wasn't appointed Duke of Pakualaman because of his young age. Now, he only acted as the regent, whereas according to the custom, anyone who had acted as regent would be appointed to succeed the Paku Alam seat. Hence, he went to Bogor and expressed his intention to be treated in accordance with the previous customs. His proposal was refused. Consequently, he requested permission to resign from his position. The Resident granted his wish to resign honorably. He was succeeded in office by Kanjeng Pangeran Harya Natadirja.

He ascended the throne on December 17, 1906. On January 5, 1909, he married Bendara Raden Ajeng Rêtna Puwasa, daughter of Pakubuwana X of Surakarta by his chief concubine, Kanjeng Bendara Raden Ayu Rêtna Purnama. As the princess consort, she was styled as Gusti Bendara Raden Ayu Adipati Suryadilaga, then Gusti Bendara Raden Ayu Adipati Paku Alam VII.

== Reign ==
On the 25th anniversary of his rule in 1931, six years before his death, he was celebrated with special events and a book.

The Pakualaman dates from 1812 and is an enclave within the Yogyakarta Sultanate. Paku Alam VII was succeeded by his son, Paku Alam VIII.

== Family ==
The following lists of wives and children were based on the source in 1937. Bendara is an alternative spelling of Bandara, and for children born to the principal consort, they may appear in certain sources with the title Gusti rather than Bendara.

- Gusti Bendara Raden Ayu Adipati Paku Alam VII, maiden name Bendara Raden Ajeng Rêtna Puwasa
  - Bendara Raden Mas Sularsa, later Kanjeng Gusti Pangeran Adipati Arya Paku Alam VIII
  - Bendara Raden Ayu Sugirwa
  - Bendara Raden Ayu Kusumaningrat
  - Bendara Raden Ajeng Kuspinah
    - Married Bendara Raden Mas Hapsoro Wresnowiro, titled Kanjeng Pangeran Harya Jayaningprang, grandson of Pakubuwana X
  - Bendara Raden Ajeng Kusdarinah
  - Bendara Raden Ajeng Kusbinah
- Concubine
  - Bendara Raden Mas Harya Surya Sutikna

== Titles ==
These titles were listed based on a Javanese newspaper issued in 1931 as the primary records. In some source, his earlier name may be appear with the title Bendara or Bandara instead of Gusti.

- During the reign of Paku Alam VI
  - Gusti Raden Mas Surarja
- During the regency of Kanjeng Pangeran Harya Sasraningrat
  - Gusti Raden Mas Harya Surarjaningrat
- During the regency of Kanjeng Pangeran Harya Natadirja
  - Gusti Raden Mas Harya Surarjaningrat
- During his reign
  - Kanjeng Gusti Pangeran Adipati Arya Prabu Suryadilaga (since 1906)
  - Kanjeng Gusti Pangeran Adipati Arya Paku Alam VII (since 1921)

== Ancestry ==
Ancestors of Paku Alam VII

Paku Alam II
Paku Alam V
Raden Ayu Resminingdiah
Paku Alam VI
Raden Mas Tumenggung Jayeng Irawan
Gusti Bendara Raden Ayu Adipati Paku Alam V
Raden Ayu Jayeng Irawan
Paku Alam VII
Paku Alam II
Paku Alam III
Gusti Kanjeng Ratu Hayu
Gusti Bendara Raden Ayu Adipati Paku Alam VI
Gusti Pangeran Harya Mangkudiningrat
A widow of Kanjeng Pangeran Harya Nataningprang

== Family history ==
- Pakualam VI Gusti Kanjeng Bandara Raden Ayu Adipati. VI; Jayeng Untara Raden; Hudayana Kawanitan (1977), Badad Pakualaman, s.n
- Jayeng Untara Raden; Jurumartani, B. R. A; Untara, Jayeng Raden; Raden Ayu Adipati, Babad Paku Alaman, yasa Swargi G.K.B.R.A.A. Paku Alam VI, wondene ings kang kedawuhan nyerat R. Jayeng Unis ara, s.n

== Notes ==
Preceded by Paku Alam VI	Duke of Pakualaman; 1903–1937	Succeeded by Paku Alam VIII
