= Paku Alam VI =

Ruler of Pakualaman

- His Grace The Duke of Pakualaman

6th Duke of Pakualaman
- Reign: 1901 – 1902
- Predecessor: Paku Alam V
- Successor: Paku Alam VII
- Born: April 9, 1856
- Died: 2 June 1902 (aged 46)
- Burial: Girigondo, Adikarto (now Kulon Progo)
- Spouse: Gusti Bendara Raden Ayu Adipati Paku Alam VI
- Issue: Paku Alam VII
- Father: Paku Alam V

Paku Alam VI, 6th Duke of Pakualaman between 1901 and 1902, as one of the shortest duration rulers in the history of Paku Alam and the Yogyakarta palaces. Pakualaman (also written Paku Alaman) became a small hereditary Duchy within the Sultanate of Yogyakarta, as a mirror-image of Mangkunegaran in the territory of the Susuhunanate of Surakarta.

== Early life ==
Prior to his coronation, he was styled Kanjeng Pangeran Harya Natakusuma.

== Family ==
- Gusti Bendara Raden Ayu Adipati Paku Alam VI
  - Gusti Raden Mas Surtiya
  - Gusti Raden Mas Surarja, later Kanjeng Gusti Pangeran Adipati Arya Paku Alam VII
  - Gusti Raden Mas Surya, later Kanjeng Pangeran Harya Suryaningprang
- Concubine
  - Bendara Raden Mas Susena, later Bendara Raden Mas Harya Suryanataningrat

== Burial ==
The son of Paku Alam V, Paku Alam VI was buried at Girigondo.

== Ancestry ==
Ancestors of Paku Alam VI

Paku Alam I
Paku Alam II
Kanjeng Bendara Raden Ayu Adipati Paku Alam I
Paku Alam V
Raden Ayu Resminingdyah
Paku Alam VI
Raden Jayeng Taruna
Raden Tumenggung Jayeng Irawan
Gusti Bendara Raden Ayu Adipati Paku Alam V
Paku Alam I
Raden Ayu Jayeng Irawan
Kanjeng Bendara Raden Ayu Adipati Paku Alam I

== Subsequent list of rulers ==
- Paku Alam VII, 1903 – 1938
- Paku Alam VIII, 1938 – 1999
- Paku Alam IX, 1999 – 2015
- Paku Alam X, 2015 –

== Family history ==
- Pakualam VI Gusti Kanjeng Bandara Raden Ayu Adipati. VI; Jayeng Untara Raden; Hudayana Kawanitan (1977), Badad Pakualaman, s.n
- Jayeng Untara Raden; Jurumartani, B. R. A; Untara, Jayeng Raden; Raden Ayu Adipati, Babad Paku Alaman, yasa Swargi G.K.B.R.A.A. Paku Alam VI, wondene ings kang kedawuhan nyerat R. Jayeng Unis ara, s.n

== Notes ==
Preceded by Paku Alam V	Duke of Pakualaman; 1901–1902	Succeeded by Paku Alam VII
