= Girigondo =

Royal graveyard in Java, Indonesia

Girigondo, also Giri Gondo – is the location of the graveyard of the family of Pakualaman in Temon District, Kulon Progo Regency, Special Region of Yogyakarta, Indonesia.

Pakualam I to IV are buried at Kotagede, Pakualam V constructed the graveyard, and Pakualam V to VIII are buried at Girigondo Paku Alam IX was also buried here on 22 November 2015.

It is situated in Kulon Progo.

As a royal graveyard location it is related to Kota Gede, Imogiri and other similar graveyards in Java.
