= Pakualaman =

Javanese princely state

Principality of Pakualaman ꦏꦢꦶꦥꦠꦺꦤ꧀ꦦꦏꦸꦮꦭꦩ꧀ꦩꦤ꧀ Kadipaten Pakualaman (Javanese)
- Flag Emblem (Poho)

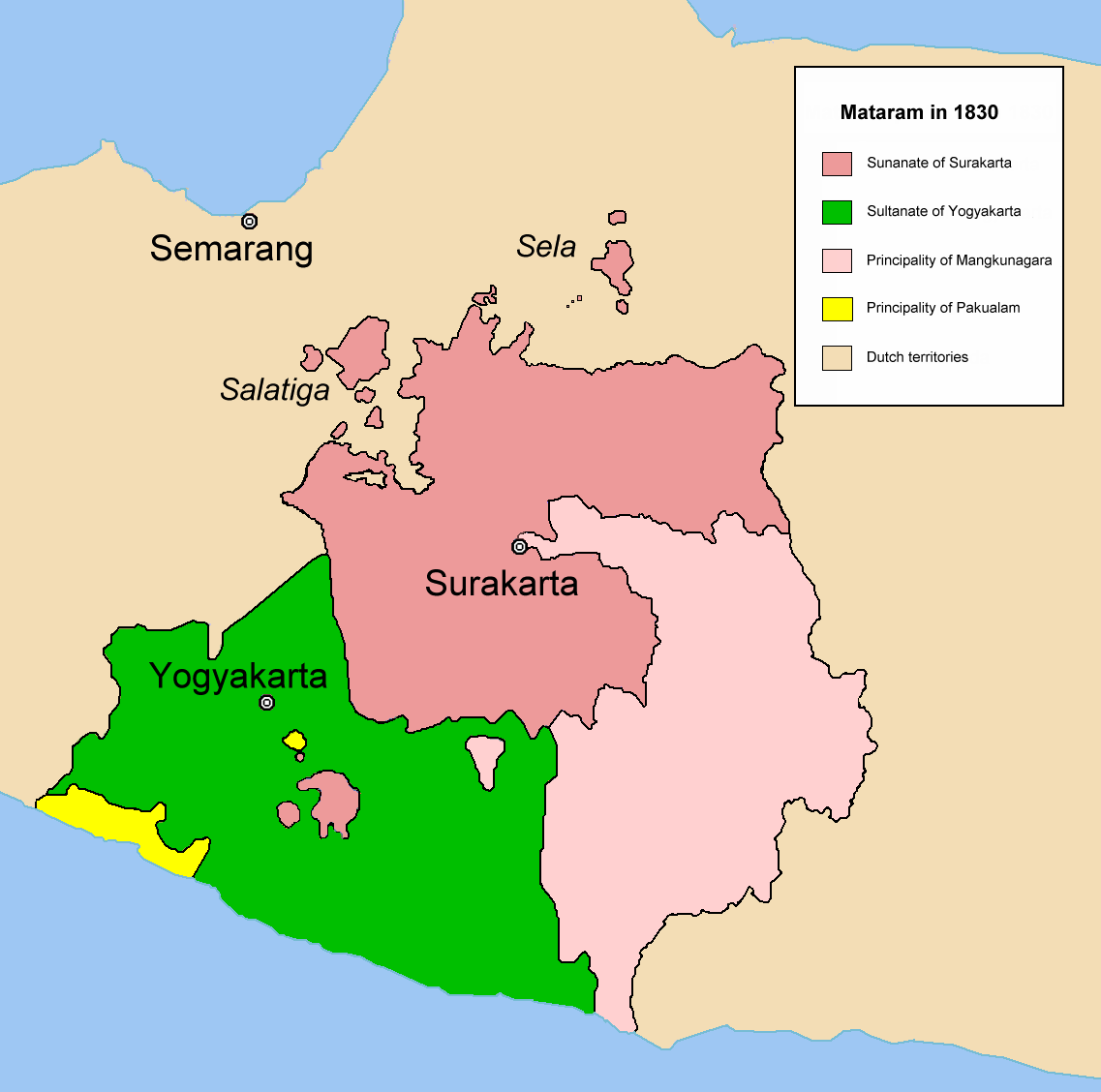
- Location of Pakualaman (yellow) within the Yogyakarta Sultanate (green).
- Capital: Pakualaman
- Common languages: Javanese
- Religion: Islam
- Government: Absolute monarchy (until 1945); Devolved Constitutional monarchy within the unitary presidential republic (from 1945)
- Duke of Pakualaman
  - 1812–1829: Paku Alam I
  - 1829–1858: Paku Alam II
  - 1858–1864: Paku Alam III
  - 1864–1878: Paku Alam IV
  - 1878–1900: Paku Alam V
  - 1900–1902: Paku Alam VI
  - 1903–1937: Paku Alam VII
  - 1937–1998: Paku Alam VIII
  - 1999–2015: Paku Alam IX
  - 2016–present: Paku Alam X
Preceded by	Succeeded by
Yogyakarta Sultanate	Special Region of Yogyakarta

The Principality of Pakualaman (also written Paku Alaman; Dutch-spelling: Pakoe-alaman) is a minor Javanese princely state within the Sultanate of Yogyakarta. It was created in 1812 when Natakusuma (later Prince Paku Alam I) was rewarded for helping the British quell the conflict in Yogyakarta in June 1812. It became the mirror image of Mangkunegaran in the territory of the Surakarta Sunanate.

A Pakualaman Corps of 100 cavalry (later 50 cavalry and 100 infantry) was established, but was never to become as significant as the Mangkunegaran Legion, and disbanded in 1892. Due to Paku Alam VIII's role in the Indonesian independence movement, a law was passed to allow the position of vice-governor of the Yogyakarta Special Region to be filled hereditarily by the reigning Prince Paku Alam at any particular time, while the Sultans of Yogyakarta fills the role of Governor on a hereditary basis.

== Etymology ==
The name Paku Alam translates literally into "Nail of the Universe" or "Nail of the World" in English (paku means "nail" and alam means "Universe" or "world").

== Formation ==
Kadipaten Pakualaman, also known as Nagari Pakualaman or Praja Pakualaman, was established on March 17, 1813, when Prince Notokusumo, son of Sri Sultan Hamengku Buwono I with his Royal Consort was crowned by Governor-General Sir Thomas Stamford Raffles (Governor General of British East Indies who ruled at that time) as Kangjeng Gusti Pangeran Adipati (abbreviated K.G.P.A.). The use of the later title Kangjeng Gusti Pangeran Adipati Arya (K.G.P.A.A.) was only used by Paku Alam V. The status of this princely state was similar to that of Mangkunegara in Surakarta.

Starting from the Ngayogyakarta Hadiningrat dispute under Sri Sultan Hamengkubuwono II against the government of the Governor-General Herman Willem Daendels of the French-Netherlands (under French influence during King Louis Bonaparte of French-Holland). Daendels sent his troops to attack the Yogyakarta Palace in December 1810 to quell the rebellion of Raden Ronggo (K.A.A. Ronggo Prawirodirdjo III, regent of Madiun, and political adviser of Sultan Hamengkubuwono II) which eventually resulted in the forced decline of Hamengkubuwono II from the throne. The power was transferred to G.R.M. Soerojo who was appointed as regent (regent) with the title Sri Sultan Hamengkubuwono III. Sultan Hamengkubuwono II's half-brother, Prince Notokusumo, and his son Notodiningrat, who supported the rebellion were also captured by the Dutch in Semarang and taken to Batavia.

In 1811, Dutch-French colonial rule on Java was captured by the British with the Capitulation of Tuntang on August 11, 1811, and the British sent Sir Thomas Stamford Raffles to lead this colony with the position of Lieutenant Governor General. Raffles tried to get support from local authorities, one of whom was Sultan Hamengkubuwono II (known as Sultan Sepuh). He sent Captain John Robinson to Yogyakarta to return Hamengkubuwono II to his throne and lowered R.M. Suryo (Hamengkubuwono III) again to become the crown prince with the title Kangjeng Pangeran Adipati Anom (K.P.A.A.) on December 10, 1811.

== Princely state ==
Kadipaten Pakualaman, Nagari Pakualaman, and Praja Pakualaman are the official names used by the smallest monarchy in southern Central Java. The monarchy founded in 1813 was in the form of a Kadipaten or a princely state. The government was run by Pepatih Pakualaman together with the Resident / Governor of the Dutch East Indies for Yogyakarta. Pakualaman's status changed over time. In 1813–1816 was a dependent state under the Government of the United Kingdom of East India (East Indian). Furthermore, in the years 1816–1942 was the dependent state of the Kingdom of the Netherlands, with the status of Zelfbestuurende Landschappen in the Dutch East Indies. From 1942 to 1945 was part of the Empire of Japan with Kooti status under the supervision of the Army XVI Army Ruler.

In 1945 the monarchy joined the Republic of Indonesia. It formed a joint government with the Yogyakarta Sultanate until 1950, when officially they were given the status of a Daerah Istimewa (special region) inside Indonesia.

The territory under Pakualaman consisted of an enclave within modern Yogyakarta City (today Pakualaman District) and the southern coastal districts of Kulon Progo Regency (known as Adikarta Regency until its merger with Kulon Progo in the 1950s).

== List of rulers ==
- Paku Alam I (1812–1829)
- Paku Alam II (1829–1858)
- Paku Alam III (1858–1864)
- Paku Alam IV (1864–1878)
- Paku Alam V (1878–1900)
- Paku Alam VI (1901–1902)
- Paku Alam VII (1903–1938)
- Paku Alam VIII (1938–1998)
- Paku Alam IX (1999–2015)
- Paku Alam X (2016–present)
