= Paku Alam VIII =

Ruler of Pakualaman from 1937 to 1998

- His Grace The Duke of Pakualaman; The Honourable The Governor of Yogyakarta; The Honourable The Vice Governor of Yogyakarta
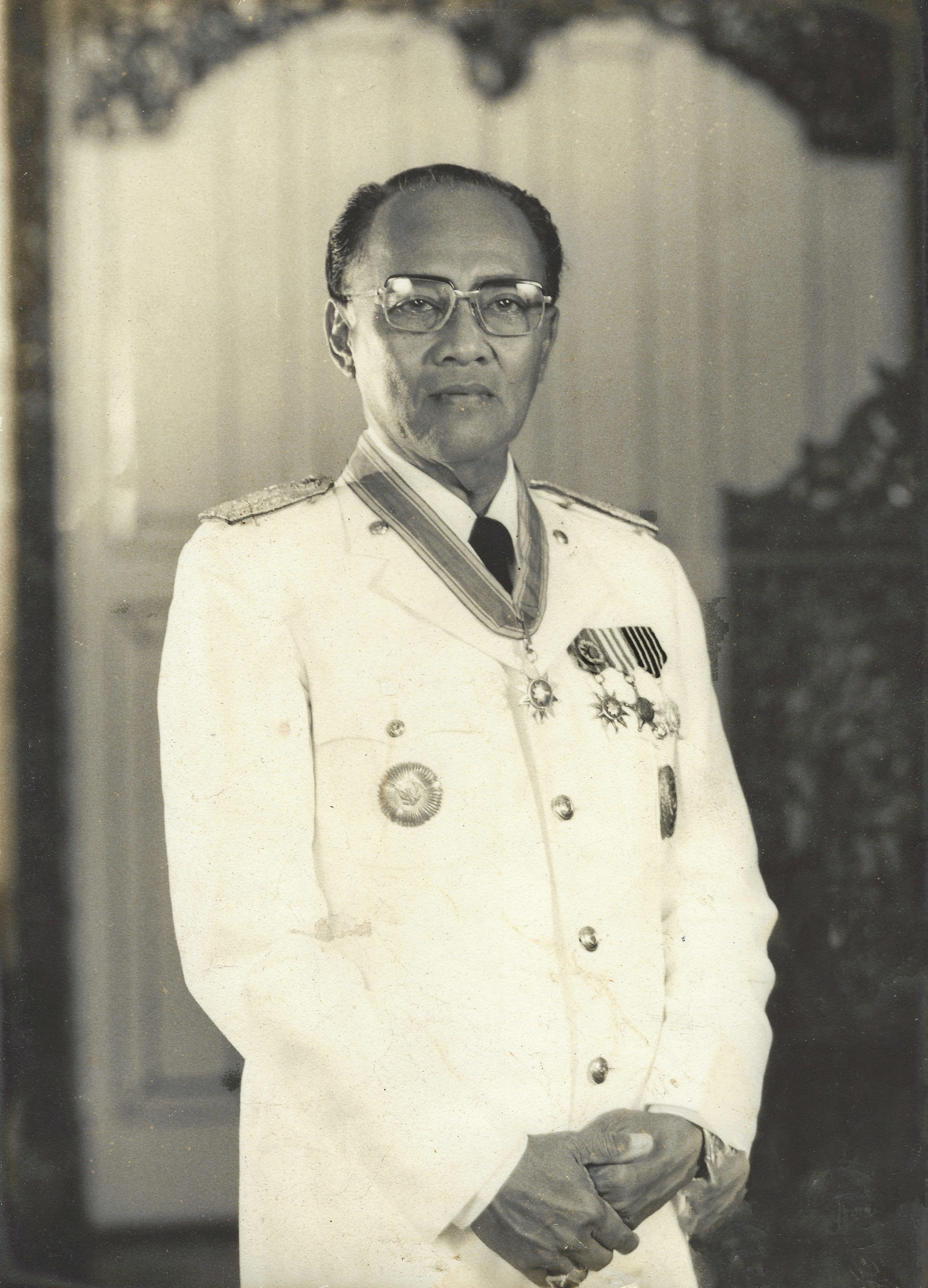
- Portrait of Paku Alam VIII

8th Duke of Pakualaman
- Reign: 13 April 1937 – 11 September 1998
- Predecessor: Paku Alam VII
- Successor: Paku Alam IX

2nd Governor of Yogyakarta
- In office 2 October 1988 (Note: Hamengkubuwono IX died on 2 October at 20:05 EDT or 3 October at 07:05 WIB) – 11 September 1998
- Vice Governor: Vacant
- Preceded by: Hamengkubuwono IX
- Succeeded by: Soebekti Soenarto (acting); Hamengkubuwono X

1st Vice Governor of Yogyakarta
- In office 4 March 1950 – 2 October 1988
- Governor: Hamengkubuwono IX
- Preceded by: Office established
- Succeeded by: Paku Alam IX
- Born: Gusti Raden Mas Sularso Kunto Suratno; 10 April 1910; Duchy of Pakualaman, Dutch East Indies
- Died: 11 September 1998 (aged 88); Yogyakarta, Indonesia
- Spouse: Kanjeng Raden Ayu Ratnaningrum; Kanjeng Raden Ayu Purnamaningrum
- Issue: 8, including Paku Alam IX
- Father: Paku Alam VII
- Mother: Gusti Bendara Raden Ayu Adipati Paku Alam VII
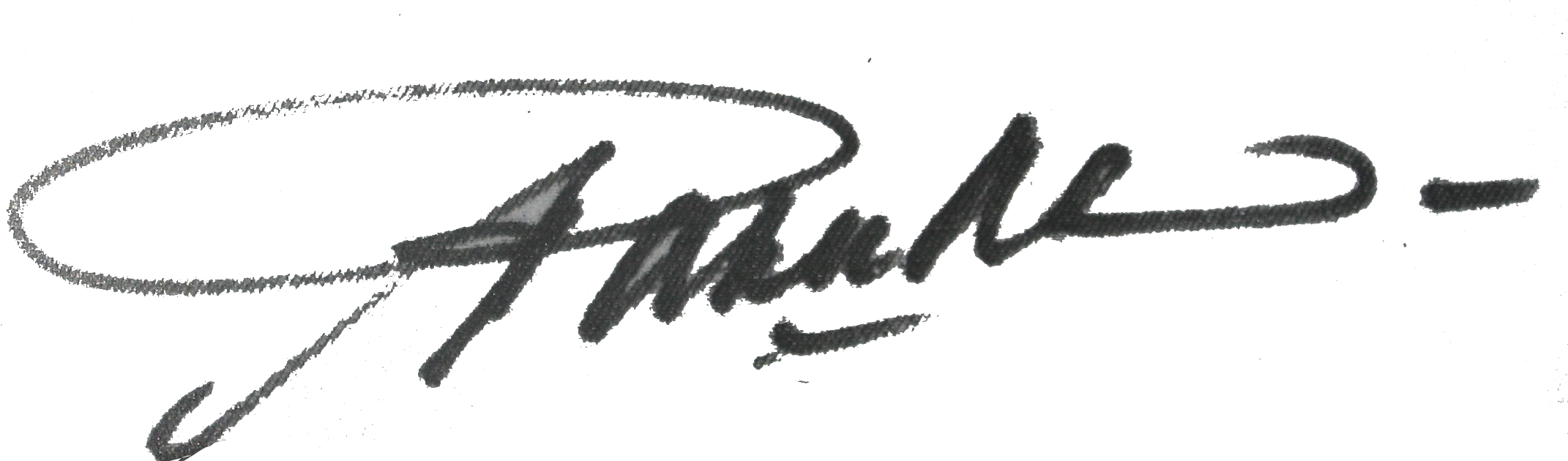
- Signature

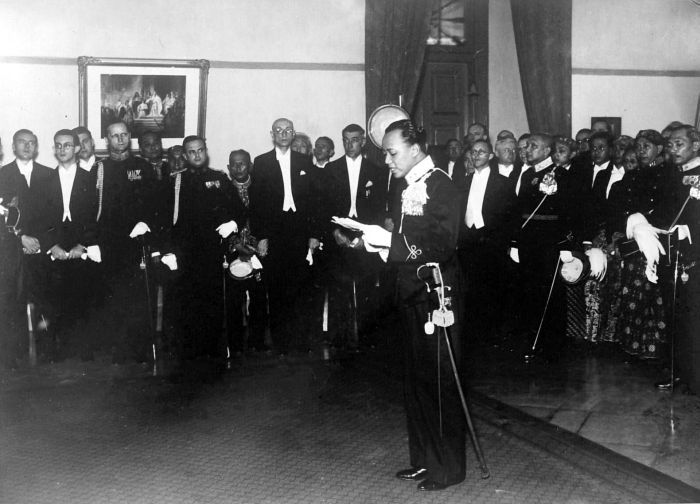
Paku Alam VIII at his enthronement ceremony in 1937

Paku Alam VIII, 8th Duke of Pakualaman (10 April 1910 – 11 September 1998) was Duke of Pakualaman serving as the second Governor of Yogyakarta. He was the son of Paku Alam VII and Gusti Bendara Raden Ayu Retno Poewoso. His child's name was Gusti Raden Mas Harya Sularso Kunto Suratno and his adult name was Kanjeng Gusti Pangeran Adipati Arya Prabu.

He acceded to the throne of the Duchy of Pakualaman (Kadipaten Pakualaman) on 12 April 1937 with the official name Kanjeng Gusti Pangeran Adipati Arya Paku Alam VIII. The Pakualaman dates from 1812 and is an enclave within the Yogyakarta Sultanate.

He died in office in 1998 and was buried in the family graveyard at Girigondo.

Paku Alam VIII was a major figure in the independence struggle. His contribution, together with that of Hamengkubuwono IX, led to Yogyakarta gaining status as a Special Region where the Sultan and the Prince serve respectively as governor and vice-governor for life.

== Biography ==
On 19 August 1945, both Hamengkubuwono IX and Paku Alam VIII sent their congratulations to Sukarno and Mohammad Hatta for the founding of the Republic of Indonesia and their election as president and vice president. As Hamengkubuwono IX send another letter stating his readiness to join the republic to Sukarno on 20 August, Paku Alam VIII followed suit. On 5 September, Paku Alam VIII decreed that Pakualaman will be an integral part of Indonesia. In a joint declaration on 30 October, Hamengkubuwono IX and Paku Alam VIII agreed to unite both realms as the Special Region of Yogyakarta with Paku Alam VIII appointed as vice governor.

From 1946 to 1978, Paku Alam VIII often worked as acting governor of Yogyakarta as Hamengkubuwono IX held ministerial positions in the Republican cabinet and as vice president. Paku Alam VIII also acted as the head of General Elections Commission in Yogyakarta during the local elections of 1951, 1955 and 1957. He himself was elected as a member of the Constitutional Assembly of Indonesia from the League of Supporters of Indonesian Independence (IPKI), member of MPRS and later as member of People's Consultative Assembly from 1997 to 1999.

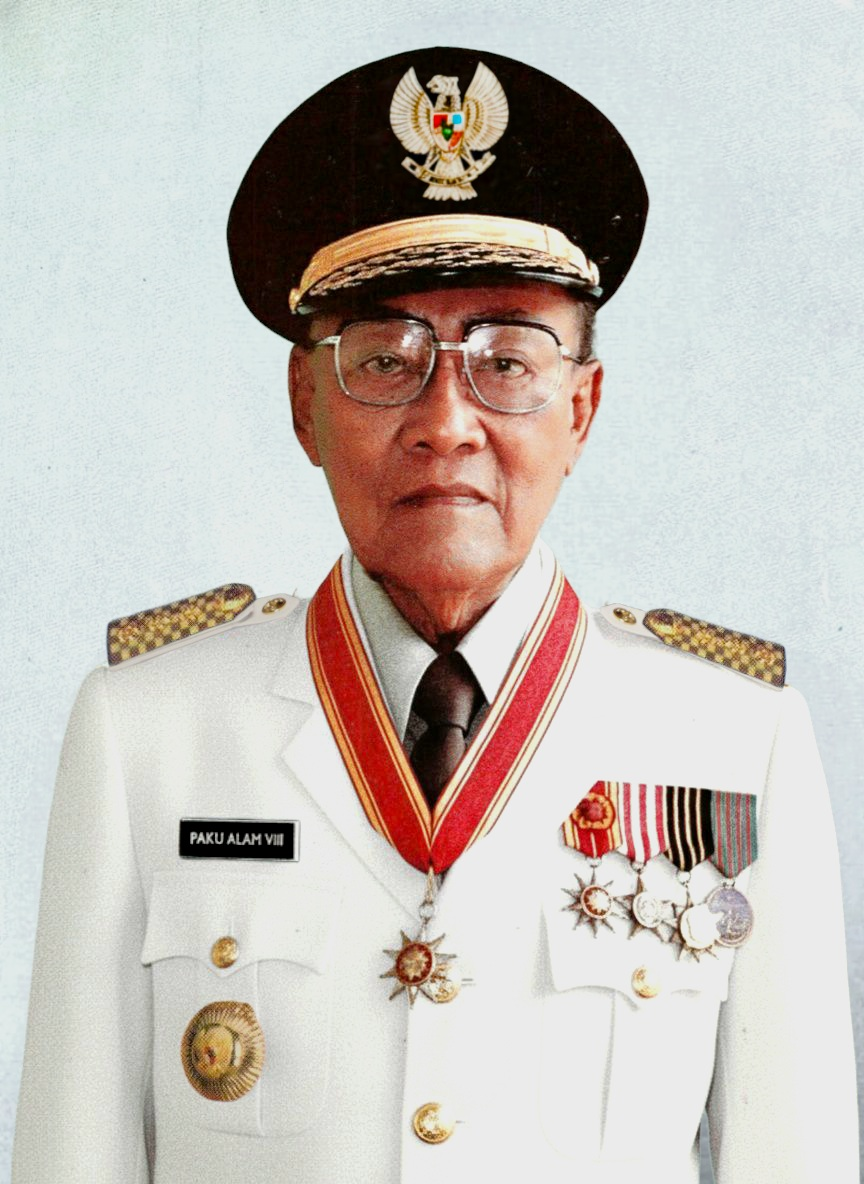
Portrait as Governor of Yogyakarta, circa 1990s

After the death of Hamengkubuwono IX on 1988, Paku Alam VIII replaced him as the Governor of Yogyakarta until his death on 1998. On 20 May 1998 in response to the May 1998 Indonesia riots, Paku Alam VIII together with Hamengkubuwono X issued a joint declaration supporting a peaceful Reformasi for Indonesia. Months later, Paku Alam VIII died in office. By the time of his death, Paku Alam VIII was the longest serving vice governor in Indonesia (1945-1998), longest serving acting governor (1988-1998) and the longest reigning Prince of Pakualaman (1937-1998).

== Honours ==
=== National ===
- Star of Mahaputera Utama
- Star of Mahaputera Pratama
- Guerilla Star
- Bintang Bhayangkara Nararya
- Satyalancana Pembangunan (1987)
- Satyalancana Wira Karya
- Satyalancana Pendidikan

=== Foreign ===
- Austria :
  - Grand Decoration of Honour of the Decoration of Honour for Services to the Republic of Austria (1996)
- Netherlands :
  - Grand Honorary Cross with Star of the Order of the Crown
- Germany :
  - Knight Commander's Cross of the Order of Merit of the Federal Republic of Germany
- Belgium :
  - Grand Officer of the Order of Leopold II

=== National Hero of Indonesia ===
On 7 November 2022, President Joko Widodo honored the late Paku Alam VIII by conferring him the title of National Hero of Indonesia. The title was awarded for recognition of Paku Alam VIII's efforts of integrating the Pakualaman into the Republic of Indonesia during the National Revolution and upholding unity. He was also being recognized as an educator, being given credit of establishing several universities such as Gadjah Mada University, Yogyakarta State University, IAIN and others. In addition, a People's School (now Puro Pakualaman Elementary School) and Puro Pakualaman Junior High School were also built. Furthermore, in 1979, the Notokusumo Foundation was established, through which Paku Alam VIII inaugurated the Notokusumo State Administration Academy and the Notokusumo Nursing Academy.

== Issue ==
Paku Alam VIII has 2 wives in which have several children from both.

- KRAy. Ratnaningrum
  - Ir. GPH. H. Probokusumo
  - GBRAy. Retno Sundari
  - GBRAy. Retno Sewayani
  - GPH. Anglingkusumo
  - GPH. Songkokusumo
  - GBRAj. Retno Pudjawati (wafat ketika bayi)
  - GPH. Ndoyokusumo
  - GPH. Wijoyokusumo
- KRAy. Purnamaningrum
  - GPH. Ambarkusumo (later KGPAA Paku Alam IX)
  - GBRAy. Retno Martani
  - GPH. Gondhokusumo
  - GBRAy. Retno Suskamdani
  - GBRAy. Retno Rukmini
  - GPH. H. Tjondrokusumo
  - GBRAy. Hj. Retno Widanarni
  - GPH. Indrokusumo

== Ancestry ==
Ancestors of Paku Alam VIII

Paku Alam V
Paku Alam VI
Gusti Bendara Raden Ayu Adipati Paku Alam V
Paku Alam VII
Paku Alam III
Gusti Bendara Raden Ayu Adipati Paku Alam VI
A widow of Kanjeng Pangeran Harya Nataningprang
Paku Alam VIII
Pakubuwana IX
Pakubuwana X
Gusti Kanjeng Ratu Pakubuwana
Gusti Bendara Raden Ayu Adipati Paku Alam VII
Raden Ngabehi Sutadipraja
Kanjeng Bendara Raden Ayu Rêtna Purnama

Pangeran Adipati Arya Paku Alam VIII House of Pakualaman Cadet branch of the House of Mataram Born: 10 April 1910 Died: 11 September 1998
Political offices
Preceded by Hamengkubuwono IX	Governor of Yogyakarta; 1988–1998	Succeeded by Hamengkubuwono X
New title Office established	Vice Governor of Yogyakarta; 1950–1988	Succeeded by Paku Alam IX
Regnal titles
Preceded by Paku Alam VII	Prince of Pakualaman; 1937–1998	Succeeded by Paku Alam IX
Other offices
Preceded by Bahder Djohan	Chairperson of the Indonesian Red Cross; 1954—1966	Succeeded by Basuki Rahmat
