= Paku Alam IX =

Ruler of Pakualaman from 1999 to 2015

- His Grace The Duke of Pakualaman; The Honourable The Vice Governor of Yogyakarta
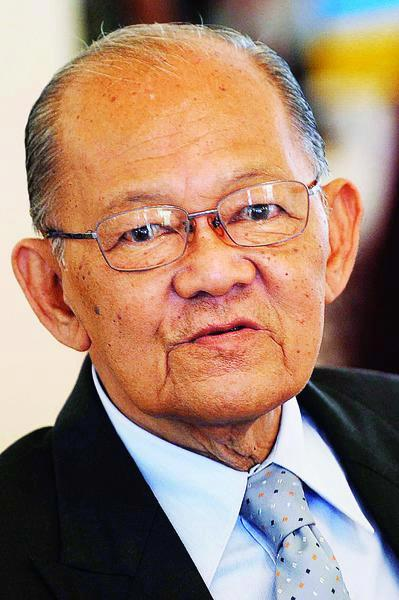
- Paku Alam IX in 2010

2nd Vice Governor of Yogyakarta
- In office 16 January 2002 – 21 November 2015
- Governor: Hamengkubuwono X
- Preceded by: Paku Alam VIII
- Succeeded by: Paku Alam X

9th Duke of Pakualaman
- Reign: 26 May 1999 – 21 November 2015
- Predecessor: Paku Alam VIII
- Successor: Paku Alam X
- Born: Ambarkusumo; 7 May 1938; Yogyakarta, Dutch East Indies
- Died: 21 November 2015 (aged 77); Surabaya, Indonesia
- Spouse: Koesoemarini
- Issue: 3, including Paku Alam X
- Father: Paku Alam VIII
- Mother: Purnamaningrum

Paku Alam IX, 9th Duke of Pakualaman (7 May 1938 – 21 November 2015) was the Duke (Pangeran Adipati) of Pakualaman, a Javanese Principality in the Special Region of Yogyakarta, Indonesia. His court name before he became Paku Alam IX was Bendara Raden Mas Ambarkusumo. He succeeded as Paku Alam upon the death of the last ruler, his father Paku Alam VIII, on 11 September 1998, and was formally installed as Kanjeng Gusti Pangeran Adipati Arya Paku Alam IX on 26 May 1999.

Like his predecessor, he was also served as the vice-governor of the Special Region of Yogyakarta under Sultan Hamengkubuwana X.

Paku Alam IX resided in Paku Alaman palace in Yogyakarta. He died on 21 November 2015 after being admitted to a hospital five days earlier.

He is buried in the family cemetery in Girigondo in the nearby Kulon Progo district.

On 7 January 2016, his eldest son Kanjeng Gusti Pangeran Haryo (KGPH) Suryodilogo succeeded him as Paku Alam X.

Pangeran Adipati Arya Paku Alam IX House of Pakualaman Cadet branch of the House of Mataram Born: 7 May 1938 Died: 21 November 2015
Political offices
Preceded by Paku Alam VIII	Vice Governor of Yogyakarta; 2002–2015	Succeeded by Paku Alam X
Regnal titles
Preceded by Paku Alam VIII	Prince of Pakualaman; 1999–2015	Succeeded by Paku Alam X
