= Mangkunegara V =

Ruler of the Duchy of Mangkunegaran

His Royal Highness Prince Mangkunegara V ꦩꦁꦏꦸꦤꦒꧫ꧇꧕꧇
- Kanjeng Gusti Pangeran Adipati Arya Mangkunegara V
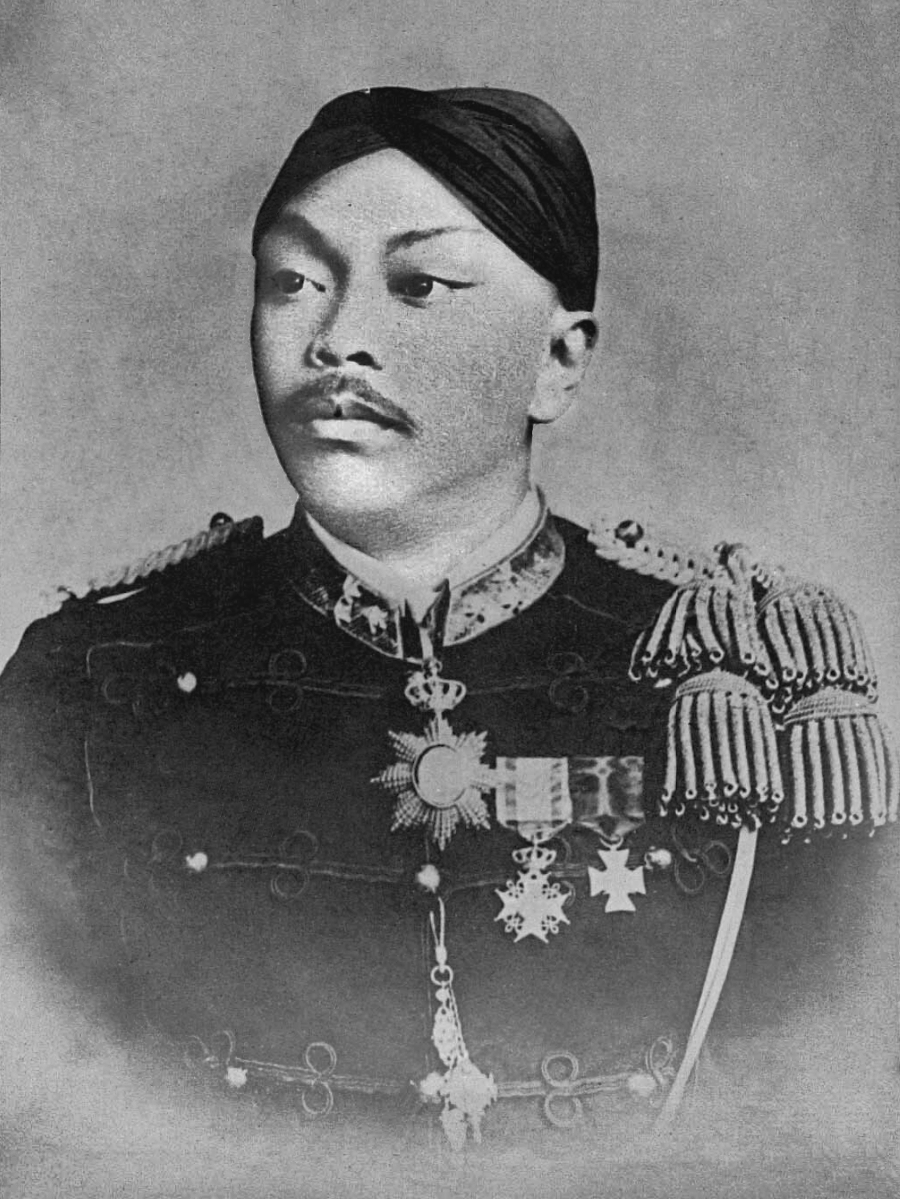

5th Duke of Mangkunegaran
- Reign: 1881–1896
- Predecessor: Mangkunegara IV
- Successor: Mangkunegara VI
- Born: Gusti Raden Mas Sunita; April 4, 1855; Pura Mangkunegaran, Surakarta, Dutch East Indies
- Died: October 10, 1896 (aged 41); Wonogiri, Dutch East Indies
- Spouse: Kanjeng Bendara Raden Ayu Adipati Prabu Prangwedana (m. 1877)
- Issue more...: 25 (all from concubines); including Mangkunegara VII
Regnal name
- Kangjeng Gusti Pangeran Adipati Arya Prabu Prangwedana V (5 September 1881–4 May 1894); Kangjeng Gusti Pangeran Adipati Arya Mangkunegara V (4 May 1894–2 October 1896)
- House: Mangkunegara
- Father: Mangkunegara IV
- Mother: Kanjeng Bendara Raden Ayu Adipati Mangkunegara IV

Prince Mangkunegara V, 5th Duke of Mangkunegaran was the fifth ruler of the Duchy of Mangkunegaran which reigned relatively briefly (1881-1896).

== Early life ==
His birth name was Gusti Raden Mas Sunita, the second son of Mangkunegara IV born to his second principal consort, Kanjeng Bendara Raden Ayu Adipati Mangkunegara (née Gusti Raden Ajeng Dunuk).

His biological elder brother, Gusti Raden Mas Prabu Sudibya, who was prepared by Mangkunegara IV to replace him as the holder of the throne, turned out to die at the age of a teenager, so it was Sunita who was later prepared as the heir to the throne. In 1869, he was granted the title of Kanjeng Gusti Pangeran Arya Adipati Prabu Prangwadana.

On August 13, 1877 (3 Ruwah Je 1806 AJ), he married Raden Ajeng Kusmardinah, a daughter of Kanjeng Pangeran Harya Hadiwijaya III, as his primary consort. Her mother was Raden Ayu Hadiwijaya (née Raden Ajeng Dhenok), younger sister of Kanjeng Bendara Raden Ayu Adipati Mangkunegara IV. Thus they're a first cousin, maternally. She died on 13 Besar Wawu 1817 AJ at 32 years old. She didn't leave any child, and he didn't elevated any of his wives into her position.

== Reign ==
In 1881, at 27 years old, he succeeded as Kanjeng Gusti Pangeran Adipati Arya Prabu Prangwadana. Later, he was formally designated as Kanjeng Gusti Pangeran Adipati Arya Mangkunegara V at 40 years old in 1894.

The reign of Mangkunegara V was relatively brief and primarily characterized by efforts to maintain the various royal enterprises established by his father and predecessor,Mangkunegara IV.

=== Mangkunegaran financial crisis ===
The reign of Mangkunegara V was marked by significant financial distress. This crisis stemmed from several factors, including internal mismanagement by court officials seeking personal enrichment and a mounting debt burden. Externally, the Mangkunegaran’s export-oriented economy suffered from European restrictions on sugar imports.

The financial situation was further exacerbated by Mangkunegara V’s limited oversight of palace affairs. By delegating administrative authority to the head of palace affairs, Prince Gondoatmojo, the treasury suffered from irresponsible management and a lack of financial control, which facilitated widespread corruption among court officials.

During this period, the state-owned sugar refineries, PG Colomadu and PG Tasikmadu, faced severe budget deficits that threatened the continuity of the industry. The global financial crisis of the 1880s, combined with the outbreak of the "sereh" disease in sugarcane plantations, crippled production. Because the Mangkunegaran's plantations were export-oriented, they were highly vulnerable to fluctuations in global market prices. Protectionist economic policies in Europe prevented plantation yields from being sold at maximum capacity. Additionally, the lavish lifestyle of the royal family deepened the deficit, eventually resulting in the palace being unable to pay its employees' salaries for nine consecutive months.

To address the bankruptcy, Mangkunegara V turned to the Dutch East Indies government for assistance. In response, the colonial administration established a supervisory commission known as the Raad van Toezicht Belasmet de Regeling van de Mangkoenegorosche Landen en Bezettingen. This board was granted the authority to oversee all financial matters, land management, and assets belonging to the Mangkunegaran, effectively allowing the colonial government to intervene in the principality’s internal economic affairs.

=== Development of the arts ===
Despite the economic downturn, the arts—particularly traditional dance—flourished within the Mangkunegaran Palace during this era. Mangkunegara V was a devoted patron of the performing arts, supported by skilled dance instructors and choreographers who had been active since the reign of Mangkunegara IV.

Many classic dances of the Surakarta-Mangkunegaran style that remain popular today were choreographed during his reign, including the Gatutk

== Death and succession ==
During his administration, Mangkunegara V was supported by his prime minister (patih), Raden Tumenggung Jaya Sarosa, who had held the position since the reign of Mangkunegara IV.

The reign of Mangkunegara V ended on 2 October 1896, when he died at the age of 41 following an accident in the Kethu Forest, Wonogiri.

Historical accounts indicate that Mangkunegara V did not designate a successor before his death. Consequently, his younger brother, K.P.H. Dayaningrat, was appointed as the next ruler with the approval and guidance of the Princess Mother Mangkunegara. At the time of his passing, Mangkunegara V's two sons from his consort—B.R.M. Suryakusuma and B.R.M. Suryasuparta—were still minors. K.P.H. Dayaningrat, who ascended as Mangkunegara VI, was tasked with the primary mission of resolving the principality's severe financial crisis and restructuring the mounting debts owed to the Dutch colonial government.

== Family ==
- Principal consort of the Prince Prangwadana (Kanjeng Bendara Raden Ayu Adipati Prangwadana), maiden name Raden Ajeng Kusmardinah
- Concubine, Bendara Raden Asmaraningsih
  - Bendara Raden Ajeng Sutikah, 1st daughter
    - Married Raden Mas Ngabehi Sutowijoyo
- Concubine, Bendara Raden Padmanawati
  - Bendara Raden Mas Samekto/Kanjeng Pangeran Harya Suryokusumo, 2rd (1st son)
    - Married Catharina Bertha
    - Married Raden Ajeng Sudarni Wreksohadiningrat/Raden Ayu Suryokusumo
  - Bendara Raden Ajeng Samekti, 3rd (2nd daughter), died young
- A palace lady, Mas Ajeng Wêrat
  - Bendara Raden Ajeng Marwestri, 4th (3rd daughter)
    - Married Raden Mas Joyodarsono
- Concubine, Bendara Raden Randaningsih
  - Bendara Raden Ajeng Sutantinah, 5th (4th daughter)
    - Married Bendara Raden Mas Guntur/Bendara Kanjeng Pangeran Harya Kusumadiningrat, son of Pakubuwana IX, in 1899
- A Chinese lady, Nyonyah Lip
  - Bendara Raden Ajeng Sutitah, 6th (5th daughter)
- Concubine, Bendara Raden Pedandamresmi
  - Bendara Raden Mas Sutanto/Kanjeng Pangeran Harya Suryo Sutanto, 7th (2nd son)
  - Bendara Raden Mas Sukanto/Bendara Raden Mas Harya Suryo Sukanto, 9th (4th son)
  - Bendara Raden Mas Sumanto/Bendara Raden Mas Harya Suryo Sumanto, 19th (11th son)
  - Bendara Raden Mas Sukamto, 23th (13th son), died young
- Concubine, Bendara Raden Purnamaningrum
  - Bendara Raden Mas Suparto/Kanjeng Pangeran Harya Suryo Suparto/Kanjeng Gusti Pangeran Adipati Arya Mangkunegara VII, 8th (3rd son)
  - Bendara Raden Ajeng Suparti, 14th (6th daughter)
    - Married Raden Mas Tumenggung Harya Daryosugondo
- Concubine, Bendara Raden Purnamaningsih
  - Bendara Raden Mas Surarso/Bendara Raden Mas Harya Suryo Surarso/Kanjeng Pangeran Harya Suryo Surarso, 10th (5th son)
  - Bendara Raden Mas Sugiyanto/Bendara Raden Mas Harya Sugiyanto, 11th (6th son)
- Concubine, Bendara Raden Pujowati
  - Bendara Raden Mas Surarto/Bendara Raden Mas Harya Surarto, 12th (7th son)
  - Bendara Raden Mas Subandriyo/Bendara Raden Mas Harya Subandriyo, 13th (8th son)
- Concubine, Bendara Raden Marduwati
  - Bendara Raden Mas Sumarno/Lieutenant Colonel Commandant Kanjeng Pangeran Harya Suryo Sumarno, 15th (9th son)
- Concubine, Bendara Raden Pandamsari
  - Bendara Raden Ajeng Sukanti, 16th (7th daughter)
    - Married Bendara Raden Mas Wiyadi/Bendara Kanjeng Pangeran Harya Mloyokusomo, son of Pakubuwana IX
  - Bendara Raden Mas Surarjo/Bendara Raden Mas Harya Suryo Surarjo, 21st (12th son)
- Concubine, Bendara Raden Pujastuti
  - Bendara Raden Mas Suwito/Bendara Raden Mas Harya Suryo Suwito, 17th (10th son)
  - Bendara Raden Ajeng Subastuti, 20th (9th daughter)
  - Bendara Raden Ajeng Sugiyanti, 22nd (10th daughter), died young
- Concubine, Bendara Raden Sumaningsih
  - Bendara Raden Ajeng Suranti, 18th (8th daughter)
    - Married Raden Adipati Arya Warsohadiningrat/Kanjeng Pangeran Harya Warsohadiningrat, Bupati Blitar
- Concubine, Bendara Raden Sumarsanaasmara
  - Bendara Raden Mas Subandoro/Bendara Raden Mas Harya Suryo Subandoro, 24th (14th son)
- Concubine, Bendara Raden Sumodiwati
  - Bendara Raden Mas Sumasto/Bendara Raden Mas Harya Suryo Sumasto, 25th (15th son)

== Ancestry ==
Ancestors of Mangkunegara V

Bendara Raden Mas Tumenggung Harya Kusumadiningrat
Kanjeng Pangeran Harya Hadiwijaya
Bendara Raden Ayu Kusumadiningrat (née Bendara Raden Ajeng Sentul)
Mangkunegara IV
Mangkunegara II
Gusti Raden Ayu Hadiwijaya (née Gusti Raden Ajeng Sekeli)
Kanjeng Bendara Raden Ayu Adipati Mangkunegara
Mangkunegara V
Kanjeng Pangeran Harya Natakusuma
Mangkunegara III
Gusti Raden Ayu Natakusuma (née Gusti Raden Ajeng Sayati)
Kanjeng Bendara Raden Ayu Adipati Mangkunegara (née Gusti Raden Ajeng Dunuk)
Kanjeng Pangeran Harya Surya Hamijaya
Kanjeng Bendara Raden Ayu Adipati Mangkunegara (née Raden Ajeng Shamsiyah)
Mas Ajeng Pulungsih
