= Mangkunegara VI =

Ruler of Mangkunagaran (1896–1916)

His Royal Highness Mangkunegara VI ꦩꦁꦏꦸꦤꦒꦫ꧇꧖꧇
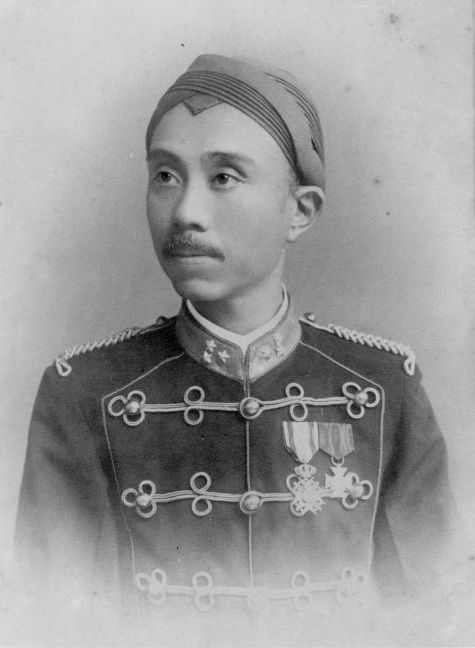
- Mangkunegara VI, c. 1895

6th Duke of Mangkunegaran
- Reign: 21 November 1896 – 11 January 1916
- Predecessor: Mangkunegara V
- Successor: Mangkunegara VII
- Born: B.R.M. Suyitno; 1 March 1857; Pura Mangkunegaran, Surakarta Sunanate, Central Java, Dutch East Indies
- Died: 25 June 1928 (aged 71); Surabaya, East Java, Dutch East Indies
- Burial: Astana Utara, Nayu, Surakarta
- Spouse: Kanjeng Bendara Raden Ayu Adipati Mangkunegara VI (m. 1884)
Era dates
- Wangsa Mangkunegoro Mataram
Posthumous name
- (KGPAA) Sri Gusti Kanjeng Pangeran Adipati Aryo Mangkunegoro Ingkang Kaping Enem (VI)
Temple name
- Astana Oetara Surakarta Hadiningrat Jawa Tengah
- House: Puro Ageng Mangkunegoro Surakarta Hadiningrat
- Father: Mangkunegara IV
- Mother: Kanjeng Bendara Raden Ayu Adipati Mangkunegara IV
- Religion: Islam
- Occupation: Adipati

Mangkunegara VI, 6th Duke of Mangkunegaran (1 March 1857 – 25 June 1928) was the prince of Mangkunegaran from 1896 to 1916.

== Early life ==
Mangkunegara VI was born in the Mangkunegaran Palace as Gusti Raden Mas Suyitno. He was the fourth son of Mangkunegara IV and his principal consort, Kanjeng Bendara Raden Ayu Adipati Mangkunegara (née Gusti Raden Ajeng Dunuk), a daughter of Mangkunegara III. When Mangkunegara V died after falling from a horse, his throne was taken by his brother.

At 10 years old, he enrolled Europeesche Lagere School Surakarta. In 1874 (1803 AJ) he was styled as Kanjeng Pangeran Harya Dayaningrat.

In 1884 (Rebo Pon, 22 Rabingulakhir, Jimawal 1813 AJ), he married his principal consort, Raden Ajeng Hartati, a daughter of Bendara Raden Mas Harya Gondowardoyo, son of Bendara Kanjeng Pangeran Harya Blitar, son of Pakubuwana IV. Her mother was Bendara Raden Ayu Gondowardoyo (née Bendara Raden Ajeng Selok), a daughter of Mangkunegara III by his concubine, Mas Ayu Sumaningsih. However, the marriage didn't produce children. His first child, a son, Bendara Raden Mas Suyono, was born in 1895 to a concubine, Bendara Raden Wandaningsih. His second child, a daughter, Bendara Raden Ajeng Suwasti, was born in 1897, to a concubine, Bendara Raden Ciptaningsih.

== Reign ==
Mangkunegara VI was crowned on 21 November 1896. He prioritized economic development. When an economic crash came because the price of sugar fell due to emerging competition from Brazil, he adjusted and repaid much of the debt incurred under his predecessor. He also enacted a number of cultural policies, obliging men to cut their long hair and made saluting unnecessary. He also brought tables and chairs into meetings that had previously been conducted sitting on the floor and allowed the people to embrace Christianity. He made the Mangkunegara Sultanate an independent power parallel to the Surakarta Sunanate. Mangkunegara VI became a new competitor in the fight over Kasunanan Javanese culture.

=== Economics ===
Mangkunegara focused on traditional sectors of rural economy, modernizing coffee, indigo, sugar cane and sugar production in the Praja.

At one point, Nederlandsch-Indische Spoorweg Maatschappij, a Dutch private railroad company was foreclosed for failure to pay taxes.

=== Policy ===
The Praja policy was applied to allow the monarchy to act as both ruler and merchant. The policy was later adopted by Kasunanan Surakarta and Yogyakarta Sultanate. Traditional land holdings were overturned and turned over to plantations.

The Legiun Mangkunegaran was reorganized. Commander Major Mangkunegaran was given the rank of Colonel. Mangkunegara VI removed the position of Vice Commander for budget reasons.

=== Regional security ===
During his reign, bandits operating around Mangkunegaran increased their activities. Budget limitations kept the King from actively dealing with them. The Praja Police were responsible for security. The gangs looted and committed murder and rape.

Along the border with Surakarta, Mangkunegara VI had conflicts with Resident of Surakarta.

Java's expansion began in 1830 with the proliferation of plantations. The gangs were disappointed in the kingdom. Robber refers to those who forcibly plundered victims, while plaster refers to robbers who were relatively inactive.

In 1872 the region recorded 24 events conducted by robbers and plasters. On 15 November 1883 robbers killed a woman in the village of Kretek Jacks, Sragen.

=== Abdication ===
Mangkunegara VI had two children; K.P.A. Suyono Handayaningrat and B.R.Ay. Suwasti Hatmosurono. Mangkunegara VI wished to make his son the crown prince, he was vetoed by a group of relatives and the Dutch Colonial government. Mangkunegara VI eventually abdicated and settled in Surabaya.

Mangkunegara VI is the only king of Mangkunegaran who resigned of his own free will. In testimony Partini Mangkunegara VI said that on 11 January 1916 he quietly resigned and went with the whole family to Surabaya.

In Surabaya his son and daughter KPA Suyono Handayaningrat and RMP Hatmosurono were active in the movement of Budi Utomo and together with Dr. Sutomo founded the political party named Parindra.

When Mangkunegara VI died he was buried in Astana Utoro Nayu Surakarta. His nephew RMA Suryasuparta reigned next as Mangkunegara VII. Mangkunegara VI chose Surabaya as a place in the old days to prepare his son and daughter to continue the concept of state that can not be implemented through a Duchy.

== Accomplishments ==
Mangkunegara VI's accomplishments included:

- Mangkunegara VI Praja reform that reduced the debt to Netherlands. Increased economic stability that improved living standards.
- Legion Mangkunegaran rebuilt strength.
- Pluralism that allowed relatives who later embraced Christianity to prosper under Mangkunegara VI.
- Reintroduced Java management principles in dealing with his father and Praja slump.
- Enforcement of financial Mangkunegara Mangkunegaran dynasty
- Created art with a puppet through without distortion story content.
- Opposed worship at the shrine that became venues for prostitution, which flourished at that time.

=== Mangkunegara VI's Legacy ===
In his reign, give relic Mangkunegara VI which until now frequently visited by the tourist is Sapta Tirta. Sumber water bath in this bath pablengan has seven kinds of natural resources which were located very close together, namely: Warm Water, Cold Water, Living Water, Water Off, Soda water, water Bleng, and water Mind your Mind.

== Family ==
Principal consort

- Kanjeng Bendara Raden Ayu Adipati Mangkunegara VI, formerly Bendara Raden Ayu Dayaningrat (born Raden Ajeng Hartati), married in 1884.

Concubines

- Bendara Raden Rêtna Asmara
  - Bendara Raden Mas Suyana (1895 - ), later Bendara Raden Mas Harya Suyana
- Bendara Raden Rêtna Wiryana
- Bendara Raden Wandaningsih
- Bendara Raden Citraningsih
  - Bendara Raden Ajeng Suwasti (1897 - )
    - Married Raden Mas Panji Atmasurana
- Bendara Raden Walgitawati
