= Mangkunegara VII =

Ruler of Mangkunegaran

His Royal Highness Prince Mangkunegara VII
- Kanjeng Gusti Pangeran Adipati Arya Mangkunegara VII
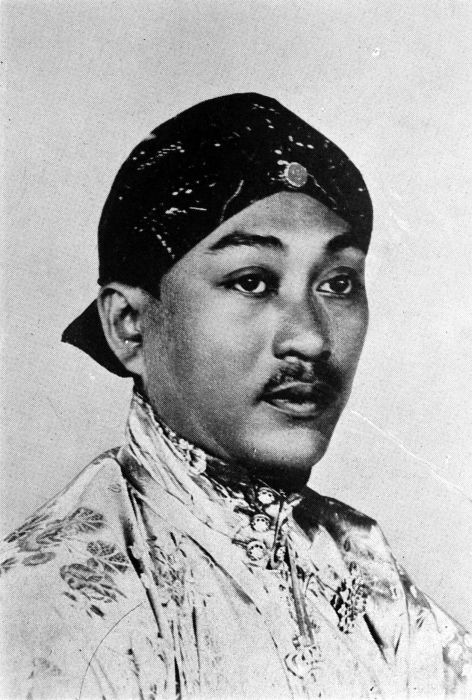

7th Duke of Mangkunegaran
- Reign: 1916–1944
- Predecessor: Mangkunegara VI
- Successor: Mangkunegara VIII
- Born: Bendara Raden Mas Surya Suprapta; November 12, 1885; Surakarta
- Died: July 19, 1944 (aged 58)
- Spouse: Gusti Kanjeng Ratu Timur of Yogyakarta (m. 1920)
- Issue more...: Gusti Nurul; Mangkunegara VIII
- House: Mataram
- Father: Mangkunegara V
- Mother: Bendara Raden Purnamaningrum

Prince Mangkunagara VII, 7th Duke of Mangkunegaran of a noble house of Hadiwijayan Kaliabu was the ruler of the Mangkunegaran Palace and lands in Surakarta in Central Java in Indonesia from 1916 to 1944, reigning during both World Wars. This first Scouting organization in Indonesia was established on the initiative of Sri Paduka Mangkunagara VII in 1916. Noto Soeroto served as his secretary.

The building in which the National Press Monument is now housed was constructed in 1918 under the orders of Mangkunegara VII, as a society building and meeting hall. It was known as Sociëteit "Sasana Soeka" and designed by Mas Abu Kasan Atmodirono.

== Early life ==
Mangkunegara VII was born with the name Raden Mas Soerjosoeparto. He was the seventh child and third son among 28 siblings sired by Mangkunegara V.

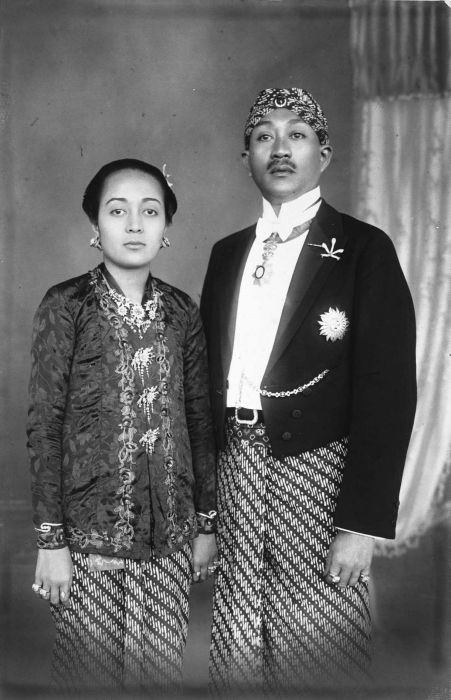
KGPAA. Mangkunegara VII and his consort, GKR. Timur.

His principal consort was a Yogyakarta princess, Gusti Raden Ajeng Mursudariyah, styled as Gusti Kanjeng Ratu Timur, daughter of Hamengkubuwana VII by his queen consort, Gusti Kanjeng Ratu Kencana. They had a daughter Gusti Raden Ajeng Siti Nurul Kusumowardani who was famous for her beauty.

His concubine, Raden Rara Mardewi was the mother of his eldest daughter, Bendara Raden Ajeng Partini. She was born in 1902, before his father ascension, at that time still pursuing his education far away. As a result, she was raised by her paternal aunt, Bendara Raden Ayu Daryosugondo (née Bendara Raden Ajeng Suparti). She married P.A. Husein Djajadiningrat, a historian and nobleman from the Banten Sultanate, which at that time had been liquidated by the Dutch East Indies colonial government. She was the patronage of Partini Tuin.

His second child, Bendara Raden Ajeng Partinah, was born in 1916, to a concubine, Bendara Raden Setyawati, a daughter of Raden Ngabehi Sastrosukarmo. She was the patronage of Partinah Bosch. She married first in 1938 to Raden Mas Ngabehi Subroto Murdokusumo until his death in 1942. She married for the second time to Raden Mas Harya Soekanto, a historian and professor of Universitas Indonesia.

His third child was Gusti Nurul, born in 1921. The next born was in 1925, his eldest son, Bendara Raden Mas Sarosa Notosuparto, born to a concubine, Bendara Raden Ayu Ratnaningrum. Upon reaching adulthood, he was styled Kanjeng Pangeran Harya Hamijoyo Sarosa, then crowned as KGPAA Mangkunegara VIII.

He had two younger sons, Kanjeng Pangeran Harya Hamijoyo Santosa, born to Mas Ayu Sitaningrum, and Kanjeng Pangeran Harya Hamijoyo Sanjaya, born to Mas Ayu Kamijen. His last child, Bendara Raden Ajeng Partimah, was born to Bendara Raden Tejawati.

One of his concubine, originally from Wonogiri a commoner-born Nyai Tumenggung Mardusari. She was a talented artist, a creator of the famous Batik Babon Angrem. She was childless.

== Biography ==
Mangkunegara VII was known in his era as a modern nobleman who contributed significantly to the preservation of Javanese culture and the Indonesian National Awakening movement. He studied at Leiden University in the Netherlands for three years before returning to Indonesia to succeed his uncle, Mangkunegara VI, who abdicated in 1916.

His pursuit of knowledge was evident from a young age; when his uncle forbade him from enrolling in the HBS, he chose to leave the palace to live independently, working as a Dutch-Javanese translator and a district-level official (mantri). His devotion to Javanese culture was demonstrated through his active role in founding the Cultuur-Wijsgeerige Studiekring (Cultural-Philosophical Study Circle) and the Java Instituut. He also authored a scholarly work on Wayang symbolism titled Over de wajang-koelit (poerwa) in het algemeen en over de daarin voorkomende symbolische en mystieke elementen (1920).

In the political sphere, he was a prominent figure in the Budi Utomo national movement and served as an advisor to the Jong Java student organization. In 1933, he pioneered the establishment of the first native-owned radio station in Indonesia, the Solosche Radio Vereniging (SRV), which broadcast programs in the Javanese language.

He also served as a Colonel in the Royal Netherlands East Indies Army (KNIL), concurrently serving as the commander of the Legion of Mangkunegaran, a private military force consisting of Mangkunegaran soldiers.

For his services in advancing Javanese culture, particularly within the former Mangkunegaran territories, Mangkunegara VII was posthumously awarded the Bintang Budaya Parama Dharma by the Government of Indonesia. Through Presidential Decree No. 66/TK/2016, President Joko Widodo presented the award to his granddaughter and representative, Retno Satoeti Yamin, on 15 August 2016.

== Reign ==
Mangkunegara VII was considered a visionary and modern ruler for his time. He successfully improved the welfare of the Mangkunegaran principality through his management of plantations (onderneming), particularly sugar commodities. He was also a patron of Javanese arts and culture, specifically supporting the development of traditional music and drama.

=== Javanese cultural reform ===
Having received a European education, Mangkunegara VII possessed an open-minded worldview. He did not reject modernity; instead, he sought to reform Javanese culture so that it could adapt to the changing times and remain competitive with Western influences.

His initial step was to promote Javanese language as a primary tool for communication and national aspiration. To realize this, he founded the Java Instituut, an institution dedicated to the development of Javanese language, literature, and culture.

Mangkunegara VII also revitalized traditional performing arts. He took a keen interest in the Panji Raden Damarwulan tales, which were adapted into wayang krucil scripts. He further developed the langendriyan (dance opera) performance known as langendriyan pitu, involving seven performers representing characters such as Damarwulan, Sabdopalon, and Menakjinggo. Under his rule, court arts—previously restricted to the palace inner circle—were opened to the public. He provided courses in waranggana (traditional singing) and organized public wayang wong performances outside the palace walls.

=== Forestry management policies ===
Mangkunegara VII implemented significant reforestation policies to counter the massive exploitation of Mangkunegaran forests for plantation industries and infrastructure. This exploitation had caused severe ecological issues: Surakarta, located in a basin, became flood-prone, while Wonogiri suffered from droughts. On 21 February 1917, the Mangkunegaran administration declared reforestation a public interest program and established a dedicated department called the Opperhoutvester.

He issued several Royal Decrees (Rijksblad) to regulate forest management:

- Rijksblad No. 22 of 1920: Established state ownership of teak forests, regulated licensing, and set penalties for illegal logging.
- Rijksblad No. 6 of 1923: Focused on forest fire prevention and restricted items citizens could carry when entering state forests to prevent theft.
- Rijksblad No. 3 of 1940: Categorized forests into teak and taun forests and outlined sustainable conservation measures.

As a result, forest cover increased from 23,567 hectares in 1917 to 26,002 hectares by 1940.

=== Public health and sanitation ===
To address water pollution and poor sanitation at the Pepe River, Mangkunegara VII commissioned the architect Thomas Karsten in 1936 to build a public bathhouse and toilet facility known as Badplaats Ngebrusan or the **"Ponten."** This facility revolutionized local hygiene habits, providing the general public with access to clean sanitation that was previously only available to the nobility and colonial officials.

=== Foundation of the Javanese Padvinders Organisatie ===
In September 1917, Mangkunegara VII founded the Javanese Padvinders Organisatie (JPO), the first indigenous scouting organization in Indonesia. This was a response to the exclusive nature of the Dutch-only scouting groups. The JPO paved the way for other national scouting movements such as Padvinder Muhammadiyah. Notably, the JPO included a women's wing, Pasoekan Poetri JPO, which served as a significant step toward women's empowerment in Javanese society.

=== Administrative and bureaucratic reforms ===
Through Rijksblad No. 37 of 1917 and No. 10 of 1923, Mangkunegara VII modernized the principality's bureaucracy:

1. Abolished the traditional dualism of Reh Jaba and Reh Jero.
2. Upgraded the status of Kawedanan (districts) to Kabupaten (regencies), led by a Bupati.
3. Replaced outdated administrative departments with new functional agencies, such as the Department of Health (Paprentahan Kedokteran) and the Village Education Office (Papentrahan Pasinaon Dusun).

== Death ==
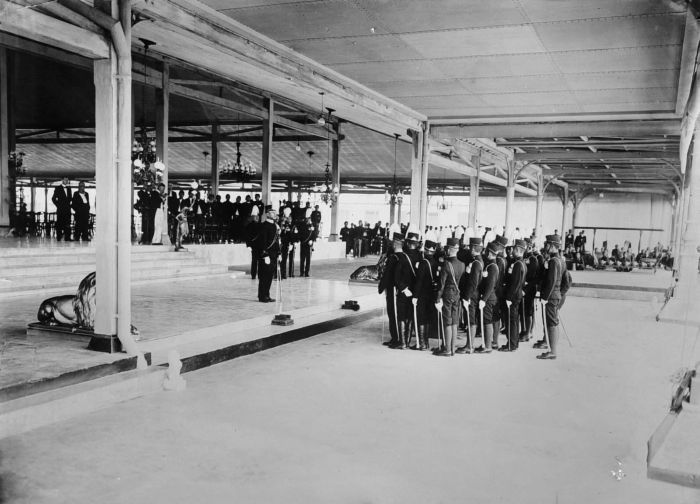
Mangkunegara VII receiving a report from the officer corps of the Legion of Mangkunegaran at the pendopo of Pura Mangkunegaran.

Mangkunegara VII died in 1944 and was buried at Astana Girilayu, Karanganyar Regency, Central Java.

== Honours ==
=== National ===
- Indonesia:
  - Bintang Budaya Parama Dharma (Posthumous; 10 August 2016)

=== Foreign ===
- Cambodia:
  - Commander of the Royal Order of Cambodia
- Portugal:
  - Commander of the Military Order of Christ (ComC) (29 December 1928)

== Works cited ==
- "Monumen Pers Nasional" (in Indonesian). City Planning Bureau of Surakarta. 10 September 2012. Archived from the original on 13 December 2013.
- Video Profil Monumen Pers Nasional [Video Profile of the National Press Monument] (in Indonesian). Jakarta: Ministry of Communications and Information. 2013.

Regnal titles
Preceded by Mangkunegara VI	Ruler of Mangkunegaran; 1916–1944	Succeeded by Mangkunegara VIII
