= De Tjolomadoe =

- PG Colomadu
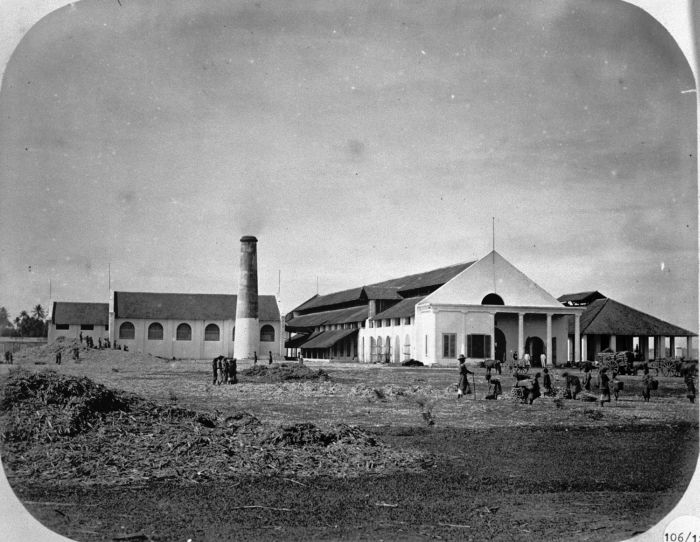
- circa 1867
- Interactive map of the De Tjolomadoe area

General information
- Type: Factory (1861-1998); Museum (2017)
- Location: Malangjiwan, Colomadu Subdistrict, Karanganyar, Central Java, Adi Sucipto Street No. 1 Malangjiwan, Colomadu, Karanganyar, Indonesia
- Current tenants: PT Sinergi Colomadu
- Groundbreaking: 8 December 1861
- Opened: 1862 (Note: Opened as a factory, then renovated in 1928 to expand the area and change the architecture); 2018 (Note: Revitalization becomes a museum)
- Renovated: 1928; 2017
- Closed: 1998
- Cost: ƒ 400,000

Design and construction
- Architect: R. Kampf

Website
- detjolomadoe.com

De Tjolomadoe or De Colomadu sugar factory was built by Mangkunegara IV at 1862 with consortium from Dutch East Indies government, located 12.7 km from center of Surakarta and 58.1 km from Yogyakarta.

== History ==
Mangkunegara IV choose a German architect R. Kampf to design the factory, groundbreaking was carried out on 8 December 1861, the factory was given the name Colomadu which means mountain of honey. The first-year crop yields of ± 95 hectares of sugar cane can produce ± 3,700 quintals of sugar. In 1928 renovation and expansion of the factory area, the renovation changed the architecture of the previous building, changes were made to the placement of new machines from Germany. In 1950 all the sugar factories that were built by the Dutch were taken over by the Indonesian government, the Colomadu factory became one of the factories that were taken over by the government, the sugar production lasted until 1998.

== Museum ==
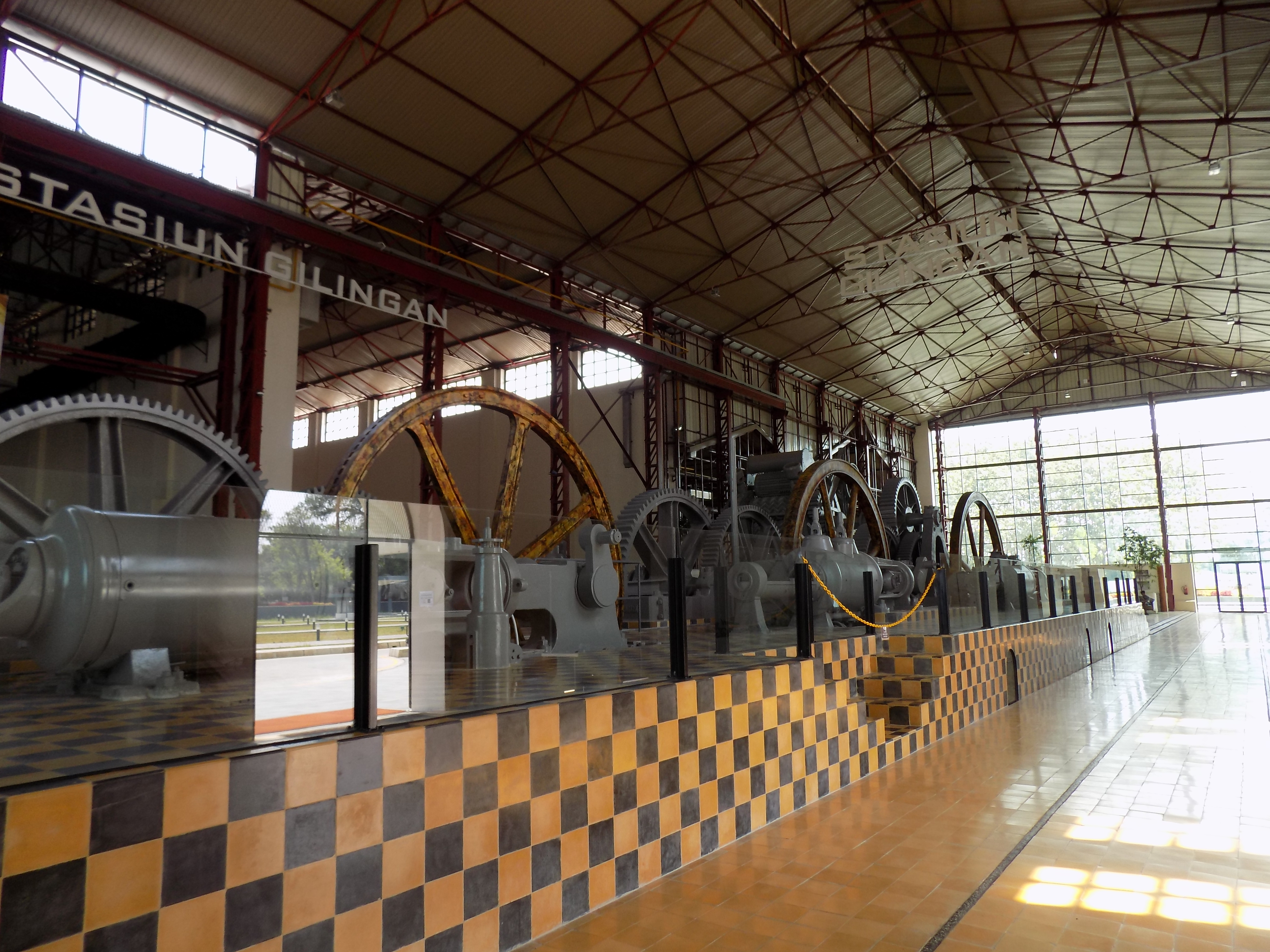
De Tjolomadoe after revitalisation as museum, 2 June 2018

After 20 years of neglect, the government has a plan to revitalize the Colomadu sugar factory into a museum, the plan has been rejected and because Mangkunegaran Palace feels that it has rights to factory assets, in the end the revitalization project will still be carried out by the government, in 2018 the Colomadu factory reopened as a museum, where the factory building became museum area, Tjolomadoe concert hall, Sarkara hall, Besali café, and retails.
