= Mangkunegara II =

Ruler of Mangkunegaran, Java, 1796–1835

His Royal Highness Mangkunegara II
- Kanjeng Gusti Pangeran Adipati Arya Mangkunegara II
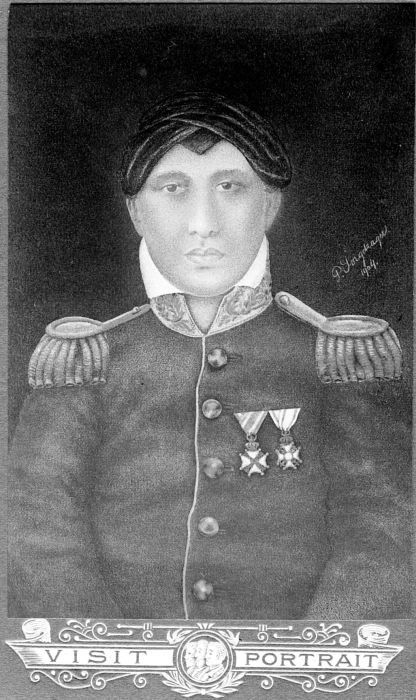

2nd Duke of Mangkunegaran
- Reign: 1796–1835
- Predecessor: Mangkunegara I
- Successor: Mangkunegara III
- Born: Bendara Raden Mas Sulama; 5 January 1768; Surakarta
- Died: 17 January 1836 (aged 68)
- Spouse: Kanjeng Bendara Raden Ayu Adipati Mangkunegara II
- Issue: Raden Ayu Natakusuma; Raden Ayu Hadiwijaya
- House: Mataram
- Father: Crown Prince Kanjeng Pangeran Harya Prabu Amijaya
- Mother: Gusti Kanjeng Ratu Alit of Surakarta

Mangkunegara II, 2nd Duke of Mangkunegaran (born Bendara Raden Mas Sulama, 5 January 1768 – 17 January 1836) was the second ruler of Mangkunegaran in Java in the eighteenth century who succeeded to the throne of his grandfather, Mangkunegara I. His reign lasted from 1796 to 1835. Mangkunegara II was the son of Crown Prince Arya Prabumijaya I, who was the son of Mangkunegara I. Upon his death in 1835, he was the last male descendant Prince Sambernyawa to be named the Duke of Mangkunegaran.

== Early life ==
A source identified him as Raden Mas Slamet, born in 1767. He came from Prabumijaya I family, born to Kanjeng Pangeran Harya Prabumijaya I, the heir apparent of Mangkunegaran and Gusti Kanjeng Ratu Alit, a princess of Surakarta. He was a grandson of both Mangkunegara I and Pakubuwana III, paternally and maternally respectively. This dynasty had a tradition of being strongly militaristic. He became Duke in Mangkunegaran, replacing his grandfather who had died in 1795.

As a youth in the care of his grandfather, Mangkunegara I had been prepared for the succession to the royal throne which had been diverted from his father, Prince Prabumijaya I who died before his father Mangkunegara I. Boundary disputes with neighboring areas increased tensions which led to open warfare. With the experiences of his youth in the direct care of his grandfather, Mangkunegara II subsequently grew to become a leader in the legendary style of his grandfather. He was the last ruler of Mangkunegaran by patrilineal lineage of Mangkunegara I.

== Government ==
While Mangkunegara II was ruler in the Duchy of Mangkunegaran, his administration was preoccupied with war and territorial expansion.

Mangkunegara's administration tended to be active and expansive. It played a role in dealing with the colonial power and relations with the other powers in Java.

=== Expanding the empire ===
During the reign of Mangkunegara II, Mangkunegaran expanded from 4,000 to 5,500 households.

In the year 1808, the Legion Mangkunegaran was formed with 1,150 armed personnel to strengthen the position of Mangkunegaran.

The use of the word "Legion" for the army reflects the Mangkunegaran absorption of new ideas from Europe through Daendels, who served as Governor-General in Dutch East Indies.

=== Regions ===
The Duchy of Mangkunegaran administration consisted of regions which include Malangjiwan, Wonogiri and Karanganyar.

== Mediate Conflict In Yogyakarta ==
=== Power situation beginning Java, 1800 ===
Government Mangkunegara II experienced success in reducing conflict in Yogyakarta as well as forming a new government in Yogyakarta that was called the Duchy of Pakualaman. Territory taken from Yogyakarta Sultanate, the first Duke of the Duchy, Prince Natakusuma was appointed Paku Alam I with the title Kanjeng Gusti Pangeran Adipati Arya on 13 March 1813.

During the reign of Mangkunegara II, Sultan who reigned in Yogyakarta was Hamengkubuwono II. Sultan of Yogyakarta in his government experienced coup attempt from foreigners, so the government of Yogyakarta Sultanate became full of tension and conflict. Yogyakarta was less ready in read-century changes involving foreign powers / Europe on the island of Java, which is different from Dutch East India Company in Java. Netherlands ruling authorities could play a role as the conquests of the ruling power. Netherlands serving ruler of Java as a strategy to obtain the desired destination.

In 1807 Daendels came to fix administrative Java and Java and the archipelago with such new rules to the authorities particularly local authorities including the kings of Java. Pakubuwana IV from Surakarta, who had refused but quickly read the situation and accepted it. Mangkunegaran quickly read the changing times and responded immediately to partnering Daendels with the establishment of modern and well trained Armed Forces Legion Mangkunegaran. Yogyakarta Sultanate was too late in reading the changes so accepted the risk of deterioration of the Kingdom.

=== European powers in Java ===
In contrast to the Netherlands, European powers who came in 1800 the military as it has the coercive power of the same pembangkangan. Sama from Europe, the European powers who came were the Revolutionary forces, always ready to fight-fighter. In the Sultan's Palace fragmented situation in the group broke down the strength of each one with a lainnya. Ada group Natakusuma with his son Natadiningrat group in addition to Crown Prince (candidate Hamengkubuwono III) by Captain Yogyakarta region namely China Tan Jiem Sing (later titled Tumenggung Secadiningrat). One more is the group that because of his position Patih Danurejo a compromise between the Sultan and the Governor Netherlands then required a governor to serve two interests of rulers; Sultanate and the Governor of the Netherlands.

The conflict between groups that invited the government in Batavia fell into the area with his army.

=== European Intervention in Java ===
In the two periods of the Governor-General (Daendels and Raffles), Yogyakarta suppressed with military force to compel Hamengkubuwono II from the throne. In December 1810 Daendels with troops, 4200 soldiers stormed Yogyakarta. Daendels removed Hamengkubuwono II and then raised the son of the Crown of Yogyakarta as Hamengkubuwono III and returned to Batavia with the Prince Natakusuma as Tawana. Pada month replacement in July 1812 with 2,000 soldiers stormed the Raffles Yogyakarta. At the same time-Sepehi Gurkha Soldiers who came to Java with the British plan involved a rebellion against British rule because of circulating rumors that they will be sold to the Netherlands and they abandoned England so as to enlarge the number of troops hit Yogyakarta then Raffles contacting their Prince Prangwadana of Mangkunegaran to exert Legion Mangkunegaran back up troops Natakusuma.

The strength of Europe who came to Java is the force that can compel because it comes with a very memadai. Terhadap combat forces that extend the power were not reluctant to act tough even if they have to dissolve the authority and traditional rulers in Java. The first victim with the advent of Daendels to Java is Banten. By Daendels Sultanate Banten dissolved.

=== Destabilization of the Sultan's Palace ===
At the time, Raffles ruled Java and replaced Janssens, Sultanate Yogyakarta threatened dibubarkan. Campur Mangkunegaran hands with Legion Mangkunegaran were successful in preventing the dissolution of the Sultanate with the completion of the founding of the Duchy Paku Alaman. Solution founding of the Duchy of Yogyakarta is compromised to prevent the emergence of a kingdom with two rulers.

Compromise is the perfect solution because there is no accuracy to get rid of Hamengkubuwono III and replace him with Prince Natakusuma and also there is no accuracy to maintain Hamengkubuwono III to get rid of Prince Natakusuma. Examples from the past who managed to defuse conflicts that go on are the division of power. 17 March 1813, Yogyakarta, split into two powers. Along with the division (still, time Raffles) Mangkunegaran got an extra entry in his control area.

=== Compromise Power in Yogyakarta ===
The power struggle in Yogyakarta ended with Prince Natakusuma inducted as a Paku Alam, who was attended by Mangkunegara II in the inaugural event but this is just the beginning of the role of Paku Alaman in the present conflict in Yogyakarta. Purna already sharing Mataram into two palaces and two Duchys.

== Personal life ==
He wed Raden Ajeng Têmu, a daughter of Kanjeng Raden Adipati Sindureja, the patih dalem of Surakarta by his primary consort. Her mother was a daughter of Kanjeng Pangeran Arya Tirtakusuma, son of Kanjeng Gusti Pangeran Arya Mangkunegara of Kartasura by his Madura wife, Raden Ayu Ragaasmara. They had two daughters. The elder was Raden Ajeng Sayati, wife of Kanjeng Pangeran Harya Natakusuma and mother of Mangkunegara III. The younger was Raden Ajeng Sekeli, wife of Kanjeng Pangeran Harya Hadiwijaya and mother of Mangkunegara IV.

== Ancestry ==
Ancestors of Mangkunegara II

Kanjeng Gusti Pangeran Adipati Arya Mangkunegara of Mataram
Mangkunegara I
Raden Ayu Wulan
Kanjeng Pangeran Harya Prabu Hamijaya
Kyai Kasan Nuriman
Raden Ayu Matahati
Mangkunegara II
Pakubuwana II
Pakubuwana III
Gusti Kanjeng Ratu Hemas
Gusti Kanjeng Ratu Alit
Mas Ajeng Rêtna Asmara
