= JPO =

JPO may refer to:

- Japan Patent Office
- Javaansche Padvinders Organisatie
- Johannesburg Philharmonic Orchestra
- Johor Premium Outlets
- Journal of Physical Oceanography
- Junior Professional Officer

== See also ==
- GPS Joint Program Office, now Global Positioning Systems Directorate
