= Mangkunegaran =

Princely state in Java, Indonesia

Principality of Mangkunegaran: Kadipaten Mangkunegaran; ꦏꦢꦶꦥꦠꦺꦤ꧀ꦩꦁꦏꦸꦤꦒꦫꦤ꧀
- 1757–present
- Flag Emblem (Surya Sumirat)
- Royal anthem: Mars Pareanom
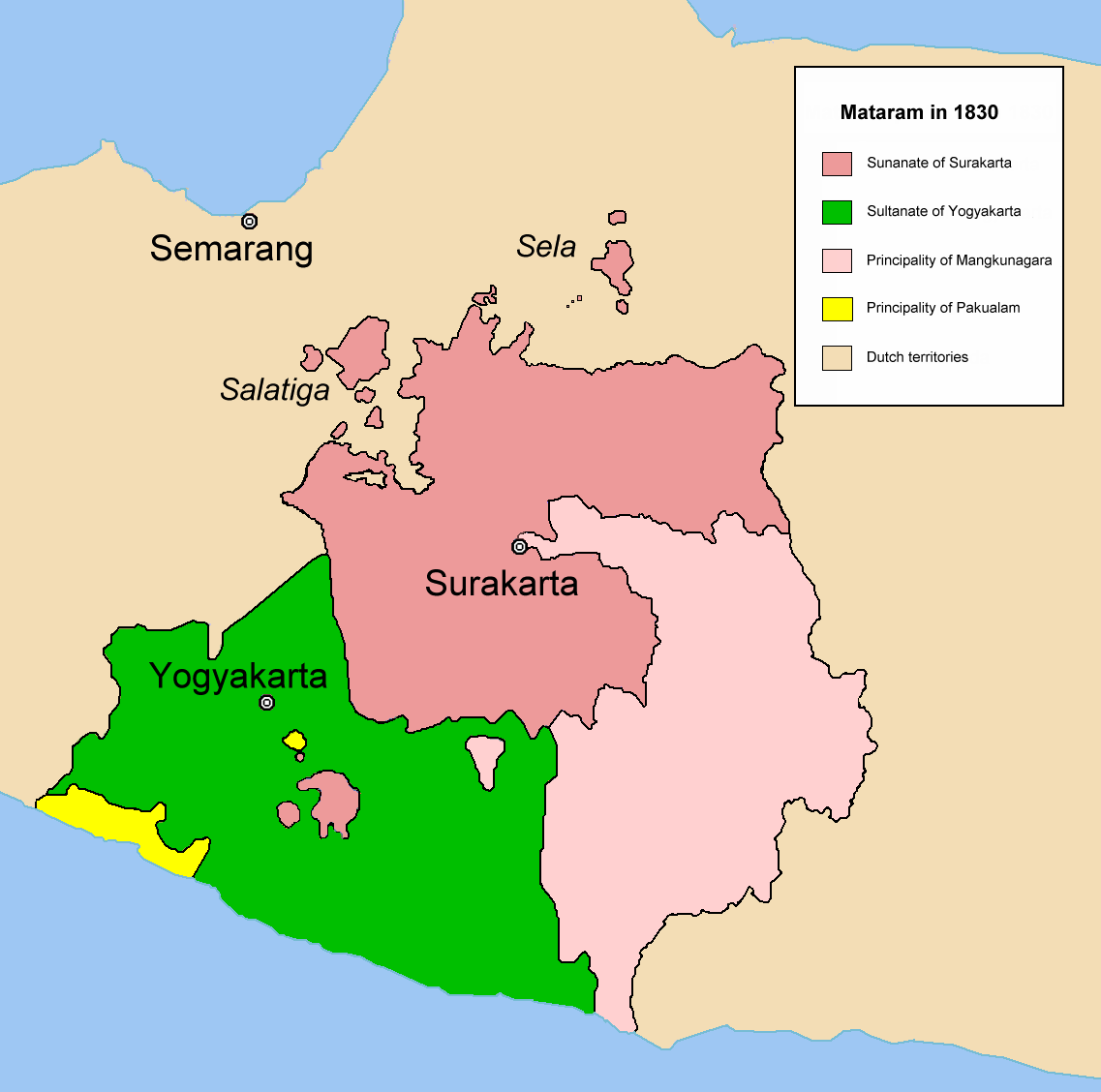
- The realm of the Principality of Mangkunegaran (pink) in 1830
- Capital: Mangkunegaran
- Common languages: Javanese
- Religion: Islam
- Government: Absolute monarchy (until 1945); Devolved; Constitutional monarchy within the unitary presidential republic (from 1945)
- Duke
  - 1757–1795: Mangkunegara I^{a}
  - 1795–1835: Mangkunegara II^{a}
  - 1916–1944: Mangkunegara VII^{b}
  - 1987–2021: Mangkunegara IX
  - 2022–present: Mangkunegara X
- History
  - Treaty of Salatiga: 1757
  - Integration with Indonesia: present
- Website mangkunegaran.id
Preceded by	Succeeded by
Surakarta Sunanate	Special Region of Surakarta
- Today part of: Indonesia
- a. Prince Mangkunegara I b. Prince Mangkunegara IX; Mangkunegaran integration with Indonesia.

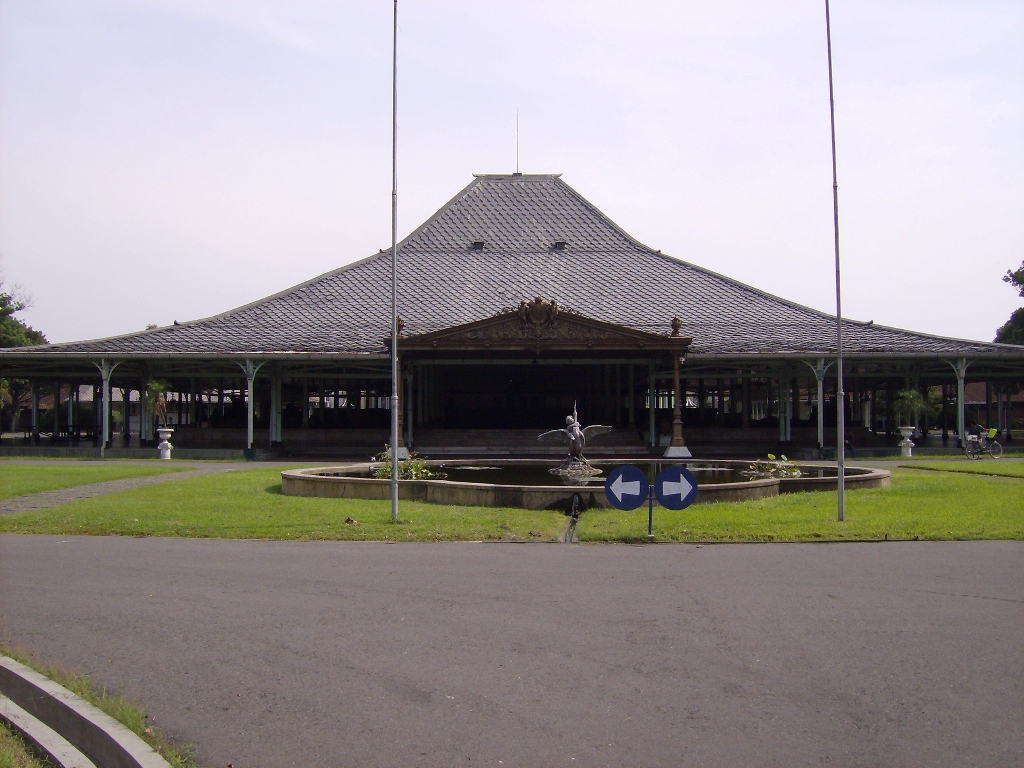
Pura Mangkunegaran

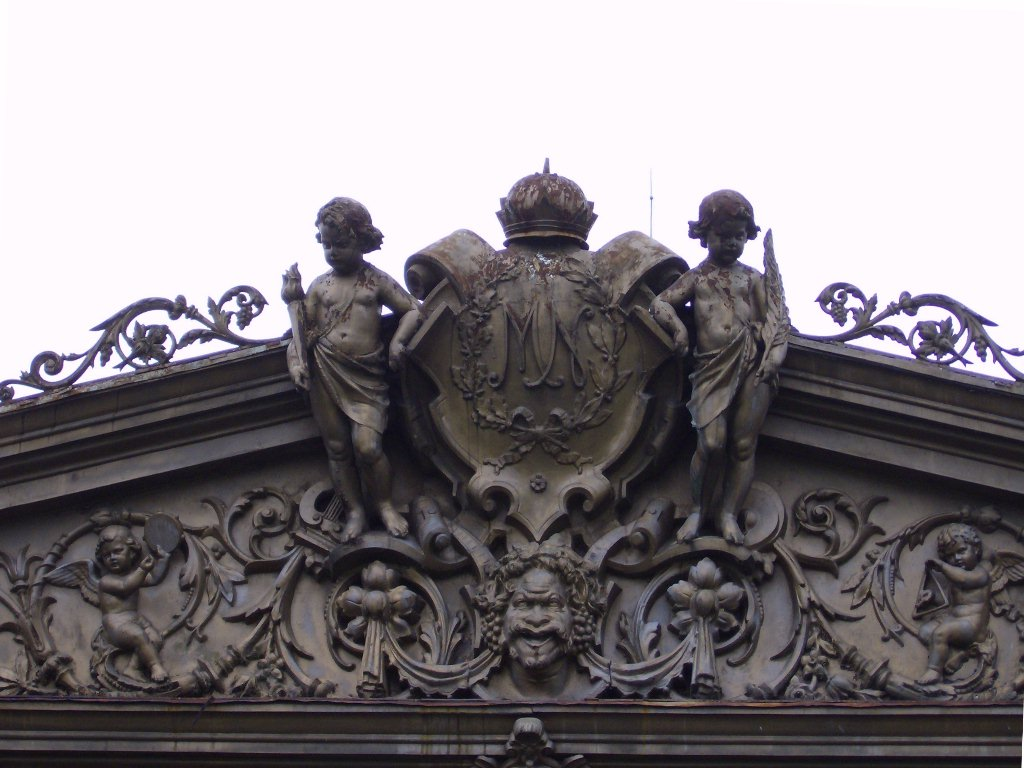
Mangkunegaran coat of arms flanked by European-style cherubins and dvarapala face below

The Principality of Mangkunegaran (Indonesian: Kadipaten Mangkunegaran) was a small Javanese princely state located within the region of Surakarta in Indonesia. It was established in 1757 by Raden Mas Said, when he submitted his army to Pakubuwono III in February, and swore allegiance to the rulers of Surakarta, Yogyakarta, and the Dutch East Indies Company, and was given an appanage of 4000 households.

The Palace of the rulers of Mangkunegaran was established by Raden Mas Said who signed a treaty with the Dutch East India Company (VOC) in 1757. By the treaty, he became the ruler of a part of Eastern Mataram and was henceforth known as Mangkunegara I. Known as Pura Mangkunegaran, the palace is located in the center of the city of Solo.

== Formation ==
Mangkunegaran is formed based on the Treaty of Salatiga (or Kalicacing Treaty) that was signed on 17 March 1757 in Salatiga to appease the rebellion conducted by Raden Mas Said (Prince Sambernyawa) against the Dutch East India Company and Pakubuwono III, the Sunan of Surakarta Sunanate after the breakup of the Mataram Sultanate through the Treaty of Giyanti signed two years prior.

Based on the Treaty of Salatiga, Raden Mas Said was given the title of Pangeran Miji and gained the right to control the lungguh region to the north, east, and southeast of the capital of the Surakarta Sunanate. The area of this region is relatively 49% of the Nagara Agung (the core area around the capital) of the Surakarta Sunanate after 1830, namely at the end of the Diponegoro War. Its territory now includes the northern part of Surakarta (the entire Banjarsari District and parts of the northern side of Jebres and Laweyan Districts, Surakarta), the entirety of Karanganyar Regency, Wonogiri Regency, and parts of the Ngawen and Semin Districts in Gunung Kidul Regency.

== Politics ==
By tradition, the rulers of Mangkunegaran was called Mangkunegara. Raden Mas Said became the 1st Duke of Mangkunegaran. They ruled from their official seat of Pura Mangkunegaran in Surakarta. The ruler of the Mangkunegaran Palace, based on the agreement that established it, is entitled to the title of Pangeran Adipati (formally Kangjeng Gusti Pangeran Adipati Arya Mangkunegara Senapati ing Ayudha Sudibyaningprang), but not the title of Susuhunan or Sultan. The Mangkunegaran Palace is a Duchy, thus its position is lower than that of the Surakarta Sunanate and the Yogyakarta Sultanate. This distinct status is reflected in several traditions that still exist today, such as the number of bedhaya dancers, which is seven, rather than nine, as in the Surakarta Sunanate. However, unlike the Duchy of Surakarta in earlier periods, Mangkunegaran enjoyed extensive autonomy, having the right to maintain its own independent army (known as the Mangkunegaran Legion) without intervention from the Sunanate.

After the independence of Indonesia, the ruling duke Mangkunegara VIII together with Sunan Pakubuwono XII pledged to have their realms be part of the Unitary Republic of Indonesia on 19 August 1945, further legalized by a royal decree on 1 September 1945. Initially, the Mangkunegaran and the Sunanate of Surakarta became the Special Region of Surakarta. However due to political instability, the special region status was revoked by the central government. The Mangkunegaran Palace continues to function as a ceremonial monarchy, guarding Javanese culture, particularly the Javanese gagrag (style) culture of Surakarta sub-Mangkunegaran. After Mangkunegara VIII died and his first son, G.P.H. Raditya Prabukusuma, had already died before him, the next heir to the throne was his second son, G.P.H. Sujiwakusuma, who later took the title Mangkunegara IX.

The rulers of the Mangkunegaran Kingdom are not buried in the Imogiri Palace, but rather in the Mangadeg Palace and Girilayu Palace, located on the slopes of Mount Lawu in Karanganyar Regency. The exception is the tomb of Mangkunegara VI, who is buried in the North Palace in Surakarta.

The official colors of the Mangkunegaran flag are golden yellow and green, nicknamed Pareanom (young pare), which can be seen on the emblem, flag, pataka, and samir worn by the courtiers and relatives of the Mangkunegaran Palace.

== List of The Ruler of Mangkunegaran ==
The Duke of Mangkunegaran holds a title Kanjeng Gusti Pangeran Adipati Aryo (His Royal Highness Duke)

=== List of adipatis of Mangkunegaran (1757–present) ===
This list is of ruling dates. Noted that the marriage(s) lists below were only included the royal consort(s), not included the concubine(s).

Name	Portrait	Birth	Marriage(s)	Death
Mangkunegara I Raden Mas Said 17 March 1757 – 28 December 1795 (38 years, 287 days)		Kartasura; 7 April 1725 Grandson of Amangkurat IV	GKR Bendara; BRAy Kusumapatahati 25 children	Surakarta; 28 December 1795 Aged 70 years, 265 days
Mangkunegara II; Bendara Raden Mas Sulama 25 January 1796 – 17 January 1835 (38 years, 358 days)		Surakarta; 5 January 1768 Grandson of Mangkunegara I	KBRAy Adipati Mangkunegara 69 children	Surakarta; 17 January 1836 Aged 68 years, 12 days
Mangkunegara III; Bendara Raden Mas Sarengat 23 January 1835 – 8 January 1853 (17 years, 352 days)		Surakarta; 16 January 1803 Grandson of Mangkunegara II	GRAj Kabibah/GKR Sekar Kedhaton; RAj Shamsiyah/KBRAy Adipati Mangkunegara; 42 children	Surakarta; 8 January 1853 Aged 49 years, 358 days
Mangkunegara IV; Bendara Raden Mas Sudira 27 January 1853 – 2 September 1881 (28 years, 219 days)		Surakarta; 3 March 1811 Cousin of Mangkunegara III	RAj Semi/RAy Gandakusuma; GRAj Dunuk/KBRAy Adipati Mangkunegara 32 children	Surakarta; 2 September 1881 Aged 70 years, 183 days
Mangkunegara V Gusti Raden Mas Sunita 5 September 1881 – 10 October 1896 (15 years, 36 days)		Surakarta; 4 April 1855 Son of Mangkunegara IV	RAj Kusmardinah/KBRAy Adipati Prabu Prangwadana 25 children	Wonogiri; 10 October 1896 Aged 41 years, 189 days
Mangkunegara VI; Gusti Raden Mas Suyitna 21 November 1896 – 11 January 1916 (19 years, 52 days)		Surakarta; 1 March 1857 Son of Mangkunegara IV	RAj Hartati/KBRAy Adipati Mangkunegara 2 children	Surabaya; 25 June 1928 Aged 71 years, 116 days
Mangkunegara VII; Bendara Raden Mas Surya Suprapta 1916 – 19 July 1944 (28 years, 191 days)		Surakarta; 12 November 1885 Son of Mangkunegara V	GRAj Mursudariyah/GKR Timur; 7 children	Surakarta; 19 July 1944 Aged 58 years, 250 days
Mangkunegara VIII; Bendara Raden Mas Surata Natasuparta 19 July 1944 – 2 August 1962 (18 years, 15 days)		Surakarta; 7 April 1925 Son of Mangkunegara VII	RAj Sunituti/GKP Mangkunegara; 8 children	Jakarta; 2 August 1987 Aged 62 years, 117 days
Mangkunegara IX; Gusti Pangeran Harya Sujiwakusuma (Note: This isn't a birthname.) 3 September 1987 – 13 August 2021 (45 years, 328 days)		Surakarta; 18 August 1951 Son of Mangkunegara VIII	Diah Mutiara Sukmawati Sukarnoputri; Prisca Marina Haryogi Supardi/GKP Mangkunegara 4 children	Jakarta; 13 August 2021 Aged 69 years, 360 days
Mangkunegara X Gusti Pangeran Harya Bhre Cakrahutomo Wira Sudjiwo (Note: This isn't a birthname.) 12 March 2022 – present (4 years, 128 days)		Surakarta; 29 March 1997 Son of Mangkunegara IX		

== See also ==
- Legiun Mangkunegaran
- Pura Mangkunegaran
- List of monarchs of Java
- Kraton Yogyakarta
