= Mangkunegara IV =

Ruler of Mangkunagaran

His Royal Highness Prince Mangkunegara IV
- Kanjeng Gusti Pangeran Adipati Arya Mangkunegara IV
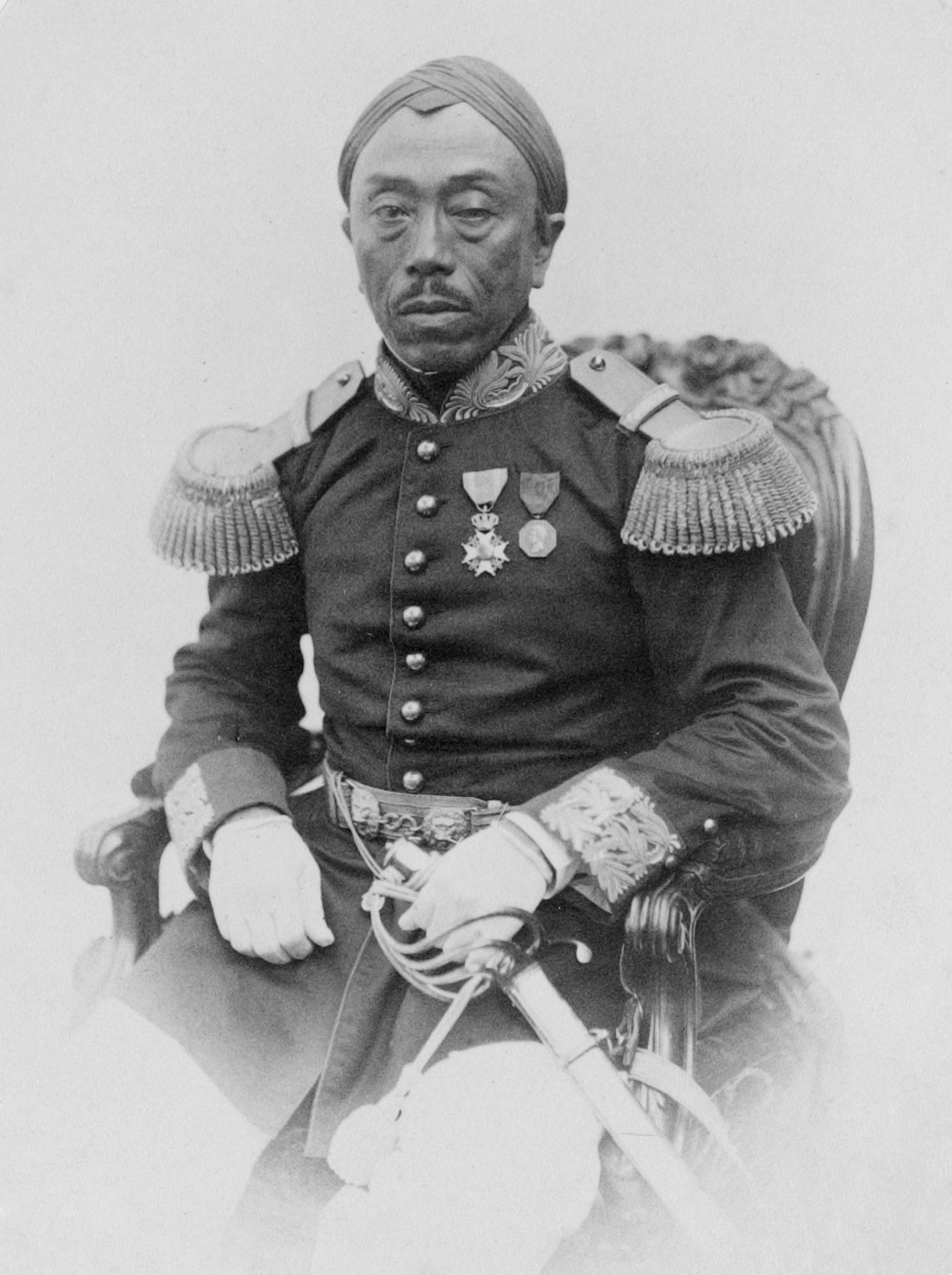

4th Duke of Mangkunegaran
- Reign: 1853–1881
- Predecessor: Mangkunegara III
- Successor: Mangkunegara V
- Born: Bendara Raden Mas Sudira; 3 March 1811; Surakarta
- Died: 2 September 1881 (aged 70); Surakarta
- Burial: Astana Girilayu, Karanganyar Regency
- Spouse: Raden Ayu Gandakusuma (m. 1831; died 1850) Kanjeng Bendara Raden Ayu Adipati Mangkunegara (m. 1853)
- Issue more...: Mangkunegara V; Mangkunegara VI; Gusti Kanjeng Ratu Pakubuwana
- House: House of Mataram
- Father: Kanjeng Pangeran Harya Hadiwijaya
- Mother: Raden Ayu Hadiwijaya

Prince Mangkunegara IV, 4th Duke of Mangkunegaran (3 March 1811 – 2 September 1881) was the fourth ruler of Mangkunegaran, a principality based in Surakarta, Java, ruling from 1853 to his death in 1881. He was son-in-law of Mangkunegara III. His title before ascending was Prince Adipati Prangwedana III.

== Early life ==
He was born on Sunday (Ahad) Legi, 8 Sapar Jimakir 1738 AJ as Raden Mas Sudira, seventh (third son) of Kanjeng Pangeran Arya Hadiwijaya. His mother was Raden Ajeng Kèli or Bendara Raden Ayu Hadiwijaya, younger daughter of Mangkunegara II born to his primary consort, a daughter of Kanjeng Raden Adipati Sindureja, prime minister of Surakarta. He was taken by his grandfather, Mangkunegara II and nursed by his concubine, Mbok Ajeng Dayaningsih. By the age of 10, he was given to be raised by his elder cousin, the Pangeran Riya (the future Mangkunegara III), cared for him like his eldest son.

The Pangeran Riya who was proclaimed as heir by the title Kanjeng Pangeran Arya Prabu Prangwadana, arranged his marriage at the age of 22 to Raden Ajeng Semi (born in 1744 AJ), six years his junior. She was his first cousin, the second daughter of Kanjeng Pangeran Arya Surya Mataram, son of Mangkunegara II by his concubine, Mas Ajeng Pujawati. They married in 1831 or 1759 AJ, and she died upon birthing their fourteenth child, a daughter in 1850 (1778 AJ) while he was still Raden Mas Arya Gandakusuma. In the same year, he was elevated by the princely title of Kanjeng Pangeran Arya Gandakusuma. He took three concubines after her death.

Upon the death of his elder cousin, Mangkunegara III, in March 1853, he was named the heir by the name of Kanjeng Pangeran Arya Prangwadana IV, and later succeeded as Kanjeng Gusti Pangeran Adipati Arya Mangkunegara IV. He received a letter sent by Governor-General Albertus Jacobus Duymaer van Twist, dated April 16, 1853, granting his request to marry the daughter of the late Mangkunegara III born to his primary consort. In 1781 AJ, he wed her as his primary consort, titled as Kanjeng Bendara Raden Ayu Adipati Mangkunegara IV (née Raden Ajeng Dunuk, born in 1758 AJ), twenty years his junior. She was the mother of his successors, Mangkunegara V and Mangkunegara VI.

== Reign ==
During his reign, the foundations of estate agriculture producing coffee and sugar were established, he became the first non-European to own sugar factories (De Tjolomadoe and Tasikmadu factory). The profits from the system were reinvested in the domains, instead of being sent abroad, as happened in many colonial situations; however, as typical for a less-developed economy, the inhabitants were dependent on the world price of these cash crops. He abolished the appanage system of compensating his retainers and officials and instead paid them salaries. Nevertheless, Mangkunegara IV had to deal with the Kingdom of Netherlands as well as the other rulers in central Java of the period. In 1857 and 1877, he was unable to reclaim land leased to European planters.

== Contributions to arts ==
Mangkunegara IV's court is especially known for its contributions to the traditional arts. He himself was a prominent poet who collaborated with Raden Ngabei Ranggawarsita (1802–1873), said to be the last of the great court poets. Mangkunegara IV's most famous poem is Wedhatama ("Exalted Wisdom"), which praises morality consistent with the mystical Islam of Java, in contrast to the more self-consciously Orthodox Islamic community.

He is also credited with the composition of several ketawang, a gamelan musical form, including Puspawarna, which was included in the Voyager Golden Record sent to outer space in the 1970s.

== Family ==
- Principal consort, Raden Ayu Gandakusuma, maiden name Raden Ajeng Semi (d. before his acension)
  - Bendara Raden Mas Sutama/Kanjeng Pangeran Harya Gandakusuma/Lieutenant Colonel Kanjeng Pangeran Harya Hadiwijaya, 1st son
  - Bendara Raden Ajeng Senen, 2nd (1st daughter)
    - Married Raden Mas Harya Tandhakusuma
  - Bendara Raden Mas Sungkawa, 3rd (2nd son), died young
  - Bendara Raden Mas Suhardi/Lieutenant Colonel Kanjeng Pangeran Harya Gandaseputra, 4th (3rd son)
  - Bendara Raden Mas Sukirna/Major (Hon.) Kanjeng Pangeran Harya Gandasewaya, 5th (4th son)
  - Bendara Raden Mas Suhendra/Major Cavalry (Hon.) Kanjeng Pangeran Harya Gandawijaya, 6th (5th son)
  - Bendara Raden Ajeng Pareng, 7th (2nd daughter), died young
  - Bendara Raden Mas Suman/Major Infantry Kanjeng Pangeran Harya Gandasiswara, 8th (6th son)
  - Bendara Raden Ajeng Mening, 9th (3rd daughter)
    - Married Raden Adipati Surya Candranegara, Bupati Demak
  - Bendara Raden Mas Sayid/Major Cavalry (Hon.) Kanjeng Pangeran Harya Gandaatmaja, 10th (7th son)
  - Bendara Raden Mas Suraya, 11th (8th son)
  - Bendara Raden Mas Satriya/Kanjeng Pangeran Harya Gandasebrata, 13th (9th son)
  - Bendara Raden Mas Sutadi, died young, 14th (10th son)
  - a daughter, died with her mother, 15th (5th daughter)
- Principal consort, Kanjeng Bendara Raden Ayu Adipati Mangkunegara IV, maiden name Gusti Raden Ajeng Dunuk (m. 1854)
  - Gusti Raden Mas Sudibya/Kanjeng Pangeran Harya Prabu Prangwadana, 23rd
  - Gusti Raden Mas Sunita/Lieutenant Colonel Commandant Kanjeng Pangeran Harya Prabu Prangwadana/Kanjeng Gusti Pangeran Adipati Arya Mangkunegara V, 24th
  - a son, 25th, died as an infant
  - Gusti Raden Mas Suyitna/Major Aide Kanjeng Pangeran Harya Dayaningrat/Kanjeng Gusti Pangeran Adipati Arya Mangkunegara VI, 26th
  - a son, 27th, died as infant
  - Gusti Raden Mas Surana/Captain Cavalry Kanjeng Pangeran Harya Handayanata, 28th
  - Gusti Raden Mas Supripta/Lieutenant Artillery Kanjeng Pangeran Harya Dayakusuma, 29th
  - Gusti Raden Ajeng Suyati, 30th
    - Married Bendara Raden Mas Adamadi/Bendara Kanjeng Pangeran Hangabehi, elevated to Kanjeng Gusti Pangeran Harya Prabuwijaya, eldest son of Pakubuwana IX
  - Gusti Raden Ajeng Sumarti/Gusti Kanjeng Ratu Pakubuwana, 31st
    - Married Pakubuwana X as his principal consort
  - a son, died as infant, 32nd
  - Gusti Raden Mas Subyakta/Lieutenant Cavalry Kanjeng Pangeran Harya Dayaputra, 33rd
  - Gusti Raden Mas Suprapta/Kanjeng Pangeran Harya Dayakiswara, 34th
  - Gusti Raden Ajeng Suprapti, 35th, died young
- Secondary consort, Bendara Raden Ayu Nataningrum
  - Bendara Raden Mas Sardana/Bendara Raden Mas Harya Nataningrat/Kanjeng Pangeran Harya Nataningrat/Kanjeng Pangeran Harya Natakusuma, 36th
- Concubine, Mas Ajeng Wignyadiwati
  - Bendara Raden Ajeng Sutrapti, 16th (6th daughter)
    - Married Bendara Raden Mas Harya Suryaputra
- Concubine, Mas Ajeng Sitawati
  - Bendara Raden Ajeng Sutarti, 17th (7th daughter)
    - Married Bendara Raden Mas Harya Surya Hudaya
- Concubine, Mas Ajeng Banawati
  - Bendara Raden Mas Sutarta/Bendara Raden Mas Adipati Harya Suganda, 18th (11th son)
- Unknown concubine(s)
  - Bendara Raden Ajeng Sepinah, 12th (4th daughter), died young
  - 5 sons, 1 died young

== Ancestry ==
Ancestors of Mangkunegara IV

Kanjeng Pangeran Arya Hadiwijaya
Raden Mas Tumenggung Arya Kusumadiningrat
Mas Ayu Cilik
Kanjeng Pangeran Arya Hadiwijaya
Pakubuwana III
Bendara Raden Ayu Kusumadiningrat
Mas Ayu Rêtna Di
Mangkunegara IV
Kanjeng Pangeran Arya Prabumijaya
Mangkunegara II
Gusti Kanjeng Ratu Alit
Bendara Raden Ayu Hadiwijaya
Kanjeng Raden Adipati Sindureja
Kanjeng Bendara Raden Ayu Adipati Mangkunegara II

Preceded by Mangkunegara III	Prince of Mangkunegaran; 1853–1881	Succeeded by Mangkunegara V
