= Mataram =

Mataram may refer to:

- Mataram kingdom (716–1016), a Hindu-Buddhist kingdom in Java
- Mataram Sultanate (c. 1586–1755), a Javanese Islamic kingdom which later was a protectorate of Dutch East Indies
- House of Mataram, dynasty or family that occupies the throne of the Mataram Sultanate
- Mataram (city), a city on the Indonesian island of Lombok, the capital of West Nusa Tenggara province
- Mataram (train), a passenger train in Indonesia

== See also ==
- Selaparang Airport, alternatively Mataram Airport
