= Demak =

Demak is on the north coast of Central Java province, on the island of Java, Indonesia.

- Demak, Demak, modern-day large town
- Demak Sultanate, sixteenth century sultanate
- Demak Regency, modern-day regency around the town
