= Mangkunegara III =

Ruler of Mangkunegaran, Java, 1735–1853

- Kanjeng Gusti Pangeran Adipati Arya Mangkunegara III

3rd Duke of Mangkunegaran
- Reign: 1735–1853
- Predecessor: Mangkunegara II
- Successor: Mangkunegara IV
- Born: Raden Mas Sarengat; 16 January 1803; Surakarta, Surakarta Sunanate
- Died: 6 January 1853 (aged 49); Surakarta, Surakarta Sunanate
- Burial: Mangadeg Royal Cemetery, Matesih, Karanganyar Regency
- Spouse: Gusti Kanjeng Ratu Sekar Kedhaton of Surakarta (m. 1824, died) Kanjeng Bendara Raden Ayu Adipati Mangkunegara III
- Issue: Kanjeng Bendara Raden Ayu Adipati Mangkunegara IV
- House: Mataram
- Father: Kanjeng Pangeran Harya Natakusuma
- Mother: Raden Ayu Natakusuma

Mangkunegara III, 3rd Duke of Mangkunegaran (born Raden Mas Sarengat, 16 January 1803 – 6 January 1853) was the third ruler of Mangkunegaran. He was a grandson of the previous ruler, Mangkunegara II, through his daughter, Raden Ayu Natakusuma.

== Early life ==
He was born on January 16, 1803, to Raden Ajeng Sayati or Bendara Raden Ayu Natakusuma, the elder daughter of Mangkunegara II. His father was Kanjeng Pangeran Harya Natakusuma, grandson of Kanjeng Pangeran Harya Hadiwijaya, thus, second cousin to his mother. Upon reaching adulthood, he was styled Kanjeng Pangeran "Prince" Riya.

Prince Riya got custody over his ten-year-old cousin, Raden Mas Sudira (the future Mangkunegara IV), whom he considered his eldest son since he didn't have any sons yet.

Pakubuwana VI letter to Hamengkubuwana V dated on Jumadilakir 12, 1751 AJ, reported his impending marriage with Raden Ajeng Kusiyah, daughter of Prince Hangabehi (the future Pakubuwana VIII) and his elder sister, Raden Ajeng Kabibah, born to Gusti Kanjeng Ratu Hemas, to Raden Mas Sarengat, the Prince Riya. He also elevated Ratu Hemas to Ratu Ageng "the queen dowager", because her name would be granted to Kusiyah. In Jumadilakir 14, the solemnization of marriage was held. Firstly, their marriage with Pakubuwana VI as the relative guardian to his sister. Secondly, Pakubuwana VI marriage with Kusiyah, and with his two high ranking concubines, Raden Ajeng Maknawiyah, daughter of Prince Mangkubumi (son of Pakubuwana III) and Raden Ajeng Blênyik, daughter of Prince Hadinegara. They had a son who died and was followed by his mother. He married for the second time to a daughter of Kanjeng Pangeran Harya Suryahamijaya. Their daughter was Kanjeng Bendara Raden Ayu Adipati Mangkunegara IV.

== Legacy ==
Kanjeng Gusti Pangeran Adipati Arya Mangkunegara III left life's lessons including têmên, mantêp, gêlêm, nglakoni, aja kagetan-aja gumunan.

== Ancestry ==
Ancestors of Mangkunegara III

Kanjeng Pangeran Arya Hadiwijaya
Raden Mas Tumenggung Arya Kusumadiningrat
Mas Ayu Cilik
Kanjeng Pangeran Arya Natakusuma
Pakubuwana III
Bendara Raden Ayu Kusumadiningrat
Mas Ayu Rêtna Di
Mangkunegara III
Kanjeng Pangeran Arya Prabumijaya
Mangkunegara II
Gusti Kanjeng Ratu Alit
Bendara Raden Ayu Natakusuma
Kanjeng Raden Adipati Sindureja
Kanjeng Bendara Raden Ayu Adipati Mangkunegara II
