= Legiun Mangkunegaran =

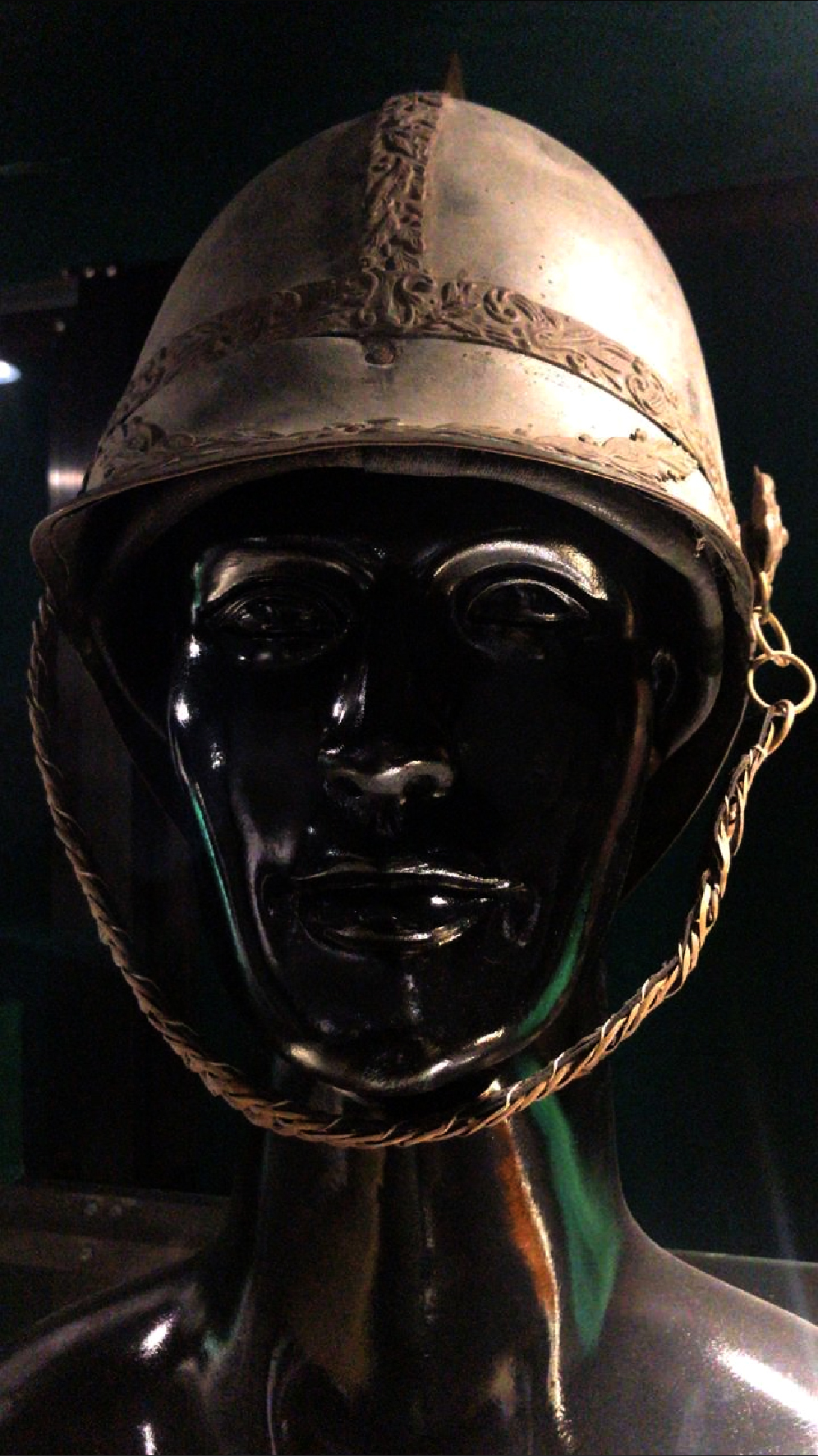
Mangkunegaran Legion Helmet

Legiun Mangkunegaran was an Army corps in Java, Indonesia. It originated in 1757 as the court army of Prince Sambernyawa of Mangkunegaran. After colonisation of Java by the Netherlands it was reorganised by Herman Willem Daendels and Mangkunegara II as part of the Dutch forces, but with Javanese commanders.

== Establishment ==
Legiun Mangkunegaran was a special military detachment owned by Mangkunegaran. The formation of the legion was influenced by the Napoleonic Wars. As France fought against the coalition forces in Europe, the war spread even to the Dutch East Indies.

The Dutch East Indies were originally a territory controlled by the Dutch East Indies Company (VOC), which was later handed over to the Dutch government in payment of the VOC's debts. When the Netherlands fell to France, the Dutch East Indies also indirectly came under French rule. Seeing that the Dutch East Indies were beginning to be ruled by French loyalists, the British government in India began planning an invasion of the Dutch East Indies, especially Java, to cripple French-supporting forces there and secure Britain's position in Malaya and India.

Knowing this, Napoleon Bonaparte appointed Herman Willem Daendels as Governor-General of the Dutch East Indies with specific orders to defend against potential British invasion. Daendels then build military installations and roads that connected major cities in Northern Java. Daendels also made efforts to gather reinforcements from small kingdoms in Java, one of which was Mangkunegaran. To Praja Mangkunegaran, Daendels then decreed the formation of a legion-level military unit, which later became known as the Mangkunegaran Legion, on July 29, 1808 and appointed Mangkunegara II as its leader. Although the Mangkunegaran Legion consisted of native soldiers, they were organized and armed in accordance with European standards of the time, making the Mangkunegaran Legion the first most modern military unit in the Asian region in the early 19th century, long before the military modernization of Siam and Japan that would occur decades later.

== Disbandment ==
Legiun Mangkunegaran was disbanded by the time of the Japanese invasion of Java and the Mangkunegaran without its military legion was recognize by the Empire of Japan as a subject. After World War II and the outbreak of the Indonesian National Revolution, members of the Legiun Mangkunegaran fought together with other republican groups and formed what would become the Indonesian National Armed Forces.

== See also ==
- Legiun Pakualaman
