= Javaansche Padvinders Organisatie =

Dutch East Indies scouting organization

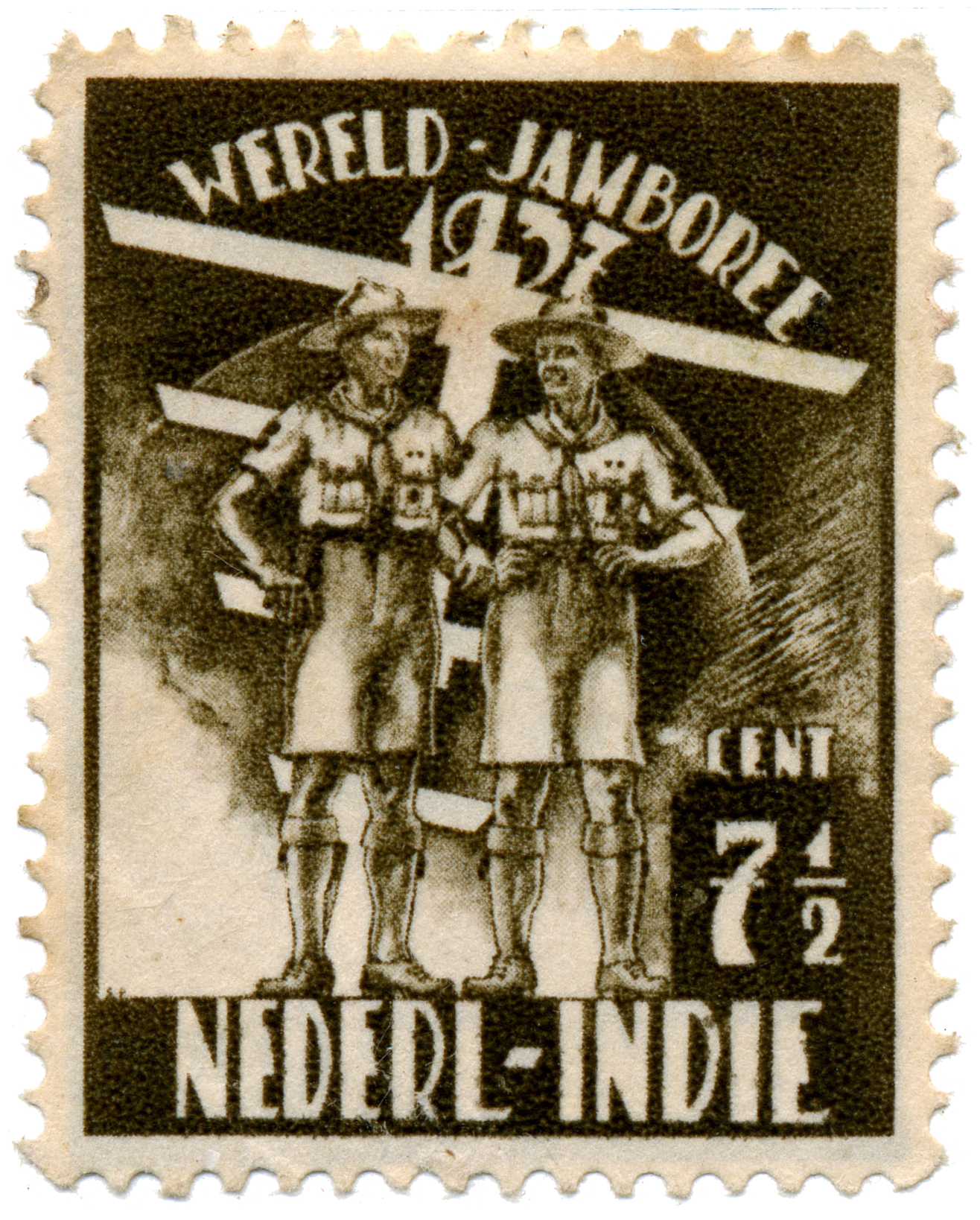
- Netherlands Indies stamp from 1937
- Country: Dutch East Indies
- Governing body: Vereeniging Nederlandsch Indische Padvinders

Javaansche Padvinders Organisatie (JPO) (English: Javanese Pathfinders Organization) was a Scouting organization in the Dutch East Indies (now Indonesia). This first Indonesian Scouting organization was established on the initiative of Sri Paduka Mangkunagara VII in 1916.

Boy Scouts from the Netherlands Indies at the World Scout Jamboree in the Netherlands (1937)

Scouting came to Indonesia in 1912, as branch of the Nederlandsche Padvinders Organisatie (NPO, Netherlands Pathfinder Organisation), the first Dutch Scouting organization. After 1916 it was called the Vereeniging Nederlandsch Indische Padvinders (NIPV, Association of Dutch Indies Pathfinders). As the Dutch East Indies, Indonesia had been a branch of the Netherlands Scout Association, yet Scouting was very popular, and had achieved great numbers and standards.
