= Pura Mangkunegaran =

Royal palace in Central Java, Indonesia

- Pura Mangkunegaran ꦥꦸꦫꦩꦁꦏꦸꦤꦒꦫꦤ꧀ Purå Mangkunagaran

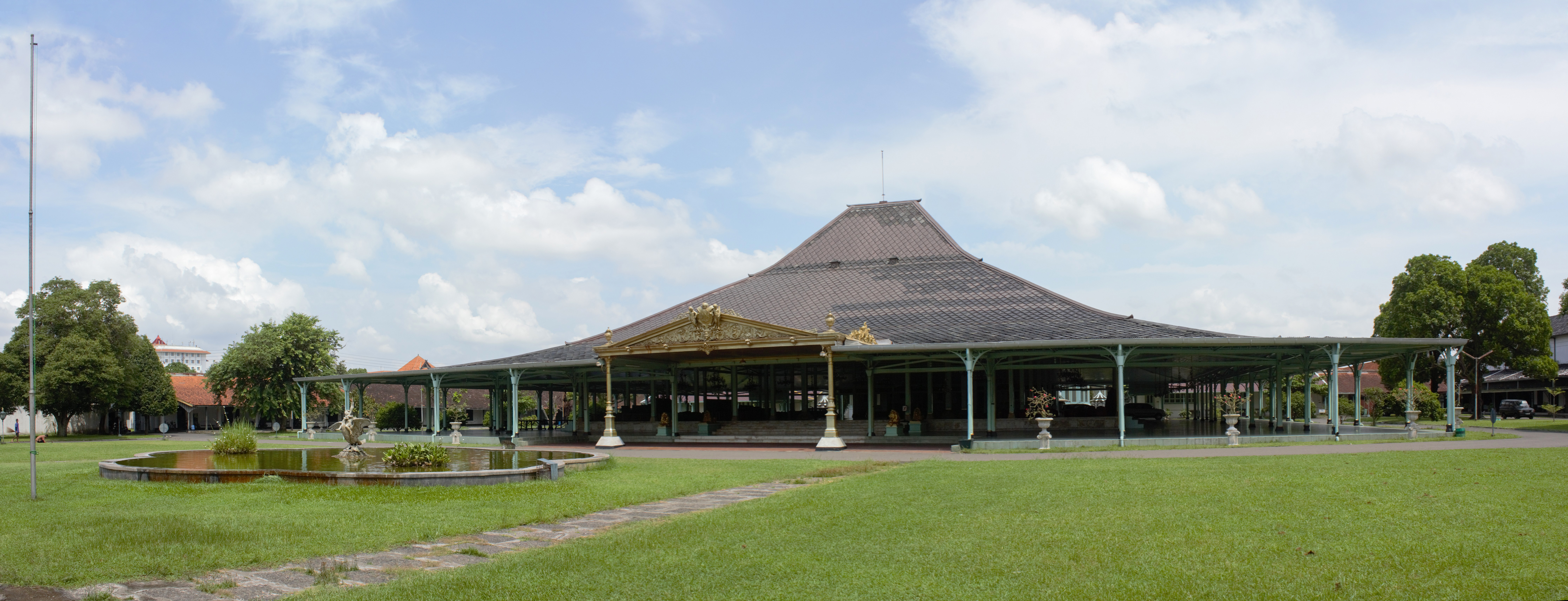
- The front of Grand Hall (Pendopo Ageng) of Pura Mangkunegaran

- Location within Java

General information
- Type: Royal Palace
- Architectural style: Javanese Architecture
- Location: Keprabon Sub-district, District of Banjarsari, Surakarta, Central Java, Indonesia
- Coordinates: 7°33′59″S 110°49′23″E
- Construction started: 1757
- Owner: The Duchy of Mangkunegaran

Design and construction
- Architect: Mangkunagara I

Website
- puromangkunegaran.com

The Pura Mangkunegaran (Indonesian: Pura Mangkunegaran, Javanese: ꦥꦸꦫꦩꦁꦏꦸꦤꦒꦫꦤ꧀, romanized: Purå Mangkunagaran) is a palace complex in the city of Surakarta, Central Java, Indonesia. It is the official palace and residence of the Duke of Mangkunegara and his family. The palace complex is one of the centers of Javanese culture and contains a museum exhibiting royal artifacts of Mangkunegaran.

== History ==
The palace complex was built in 1757 (AJ 1690) following the style of Kraton by the command of Mangkunegara I, the first Duke of Mangkunegaran.

This royal palace was built after the Treaty of Salatiga was signed by Mangkunegara I, Hamengkubuwana I, Pakubuwana III, and the VOC in March 1757. The treaty initiated the creation of the Duchy of Mangkunegaran and the investiture of Mangkunegara I as the first ruler.

Like any other palaces in Java, The Pura Mangkunegaran had experienced several renovations, rejuvenation, changes in its parts and structures, and also the addition of popular European style to its architecture during the Dutch colonization.

== Architecture ==
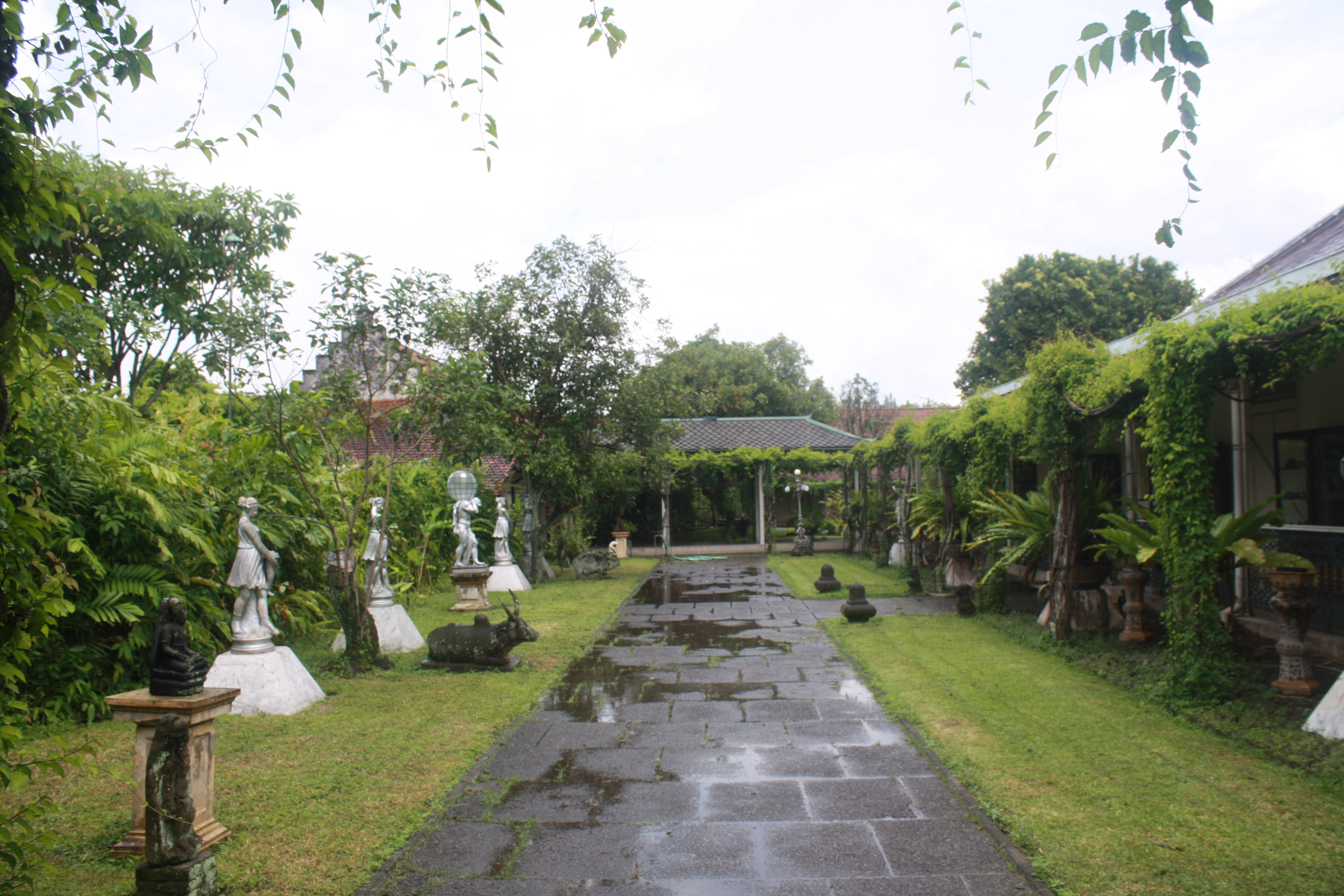
One of the gardens in Pura Mangkunagaran complex.

The architecture of the Pura Mangkunegaran has similar features to other kratons in Surakarta and Yogyakarta, it has various features such as a courtyard (pamédan), hall (pendapa), vestibule or antechamber (pringgitan), main house (dalem), and harem or private apartment (keputrèn). Almost all of the Pura Mangkunegaran complex is surrounded by a wall, an exception for the courtyard (pamédan) which is surrounded by iron fences only. The courtyard itself was and is still occasionally used as a training ground for the Mangkunegaran Legion troops. On the east of the courtyard, there is the headquarters of the infantry and cavalry troops of the Mangkunegaran Legion which had a fortress-like building.

The second gate of the Pura Mangkunegaran leads to the inner courtyard and the Grand Hall (Pendopo Ageng) which measures 3,500 m^{2} (37,673.69 sq ft). The Grand Hall of the Pura Mangkunegaran can host five to ten thousand people, and it is considered the largest hall in Indonesia. The wooden pillars of the Grand Hall are square-shaped and made of wood from the Kethu Forest trees (Alas Kethu) which is located in Wonogiri and was one of the regions owned by the Duchy of Mangkunegaran. All parts of the Grand Hall building were constructed without using any nails as its fastener.

The major colors of this hall are green, yellow, and chartreuse (Pareanom) which are the royal colors of the Duchy of Mangkunegaran. The bright color of the Grand Hall ceiling symbolizes Hindu-Javanese astrology which is closely attached to the culture of the Mataram dynasty. The ceiling of the Grand Hall also has some antique chandeliers. In the early era of the Duchy of Mangkunegaran, people who attended the Grand Hall usually sat cross-legged on the floor. Then during the reign of Mangkunegara VI, the use of a chair was introduced. Inside the Grand Hall, there are several sacred gamelan, the gamelan of Kyai Seton, the gamelan of Kyai Kanyut Mesem, and the gamelan of Lipur Sari, each of these gamelan are played only on special or specific occasions.

Behind the Grand Hall, there is an open veranda called Pringgitan which has stairs that leads to the main house (Dalem Ageng). This veranda measures 1.000 m² and it is used as a place for shadow puppet shows.

The Pringgitan leads to the main house (Dalem Ageng), it is a pyramid-shaped building with an area of ±1,000 m^{2} (10,763.91 sq ft). Traditionally, this main house was used as the bridechamber of the royal duke and duchess, but these days this building has functioned as a museum that exhibits several royal artifacts of Mangkunegaran, pictures of the dukes of Mangkunegaran, the royal attires and clothes, medals, royal jewelry, shadow puppet equipment, coins, petanen (a residing place of Dewi Sri), and many other art objects.

Behind the main house (Dalem Ageng), there is Keputrèn which roughly translates as a harem. Traditionally, it was used as the residence of the royal consort(s) and princesses. However now, the Keputrèn is used as the private apartment or residence for the duke and his family. This part of the Pura Mangkunegaran has a garden with various plants, flowers, ornamental shrubs, bird cages, a fountain pool, and some classical European-style statues.

Facing the garden, there is also Pracimoyasa, a living room with an octagonal shape that functions as a meeting room. Inside the room has some European furniture and gold-framed mirrors on the wall.

The Pura Mangkunagaran complex also has a library called the Rekso Pustoko Library (Perpustakaan Rekso Pustoko) built in 1867 by Mangkunegara IV. The library is located on the second floor of the Palace Affairs Office situated on the left of the courtyard (pamèdan). This library has some of the valuable historical heritages such as leather-bound manuscripts, books written in Javanese language and script, a collection of historical pictures, photos, and archive files of plantation and any possessions owned by the Duchy of Mangkunegaran.

== Gallery ==
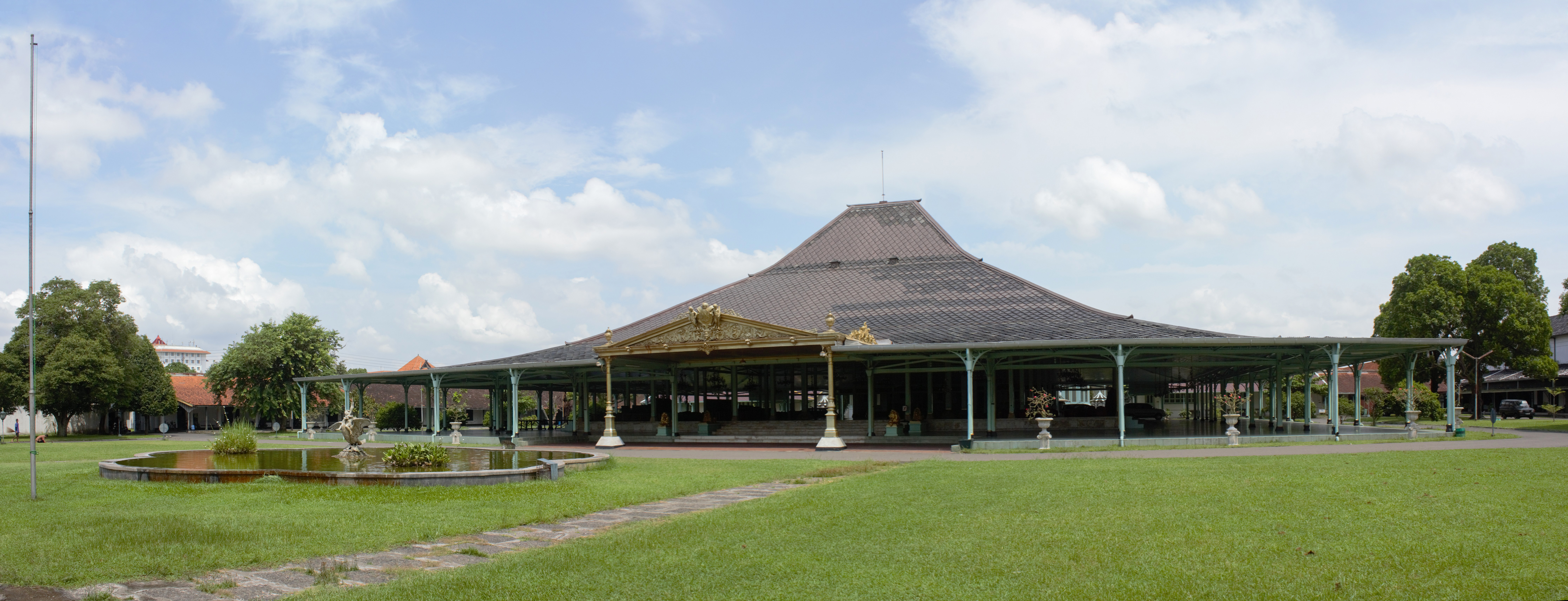
Inner Courtyard and Grand Hall of Mangkunegaran Palace

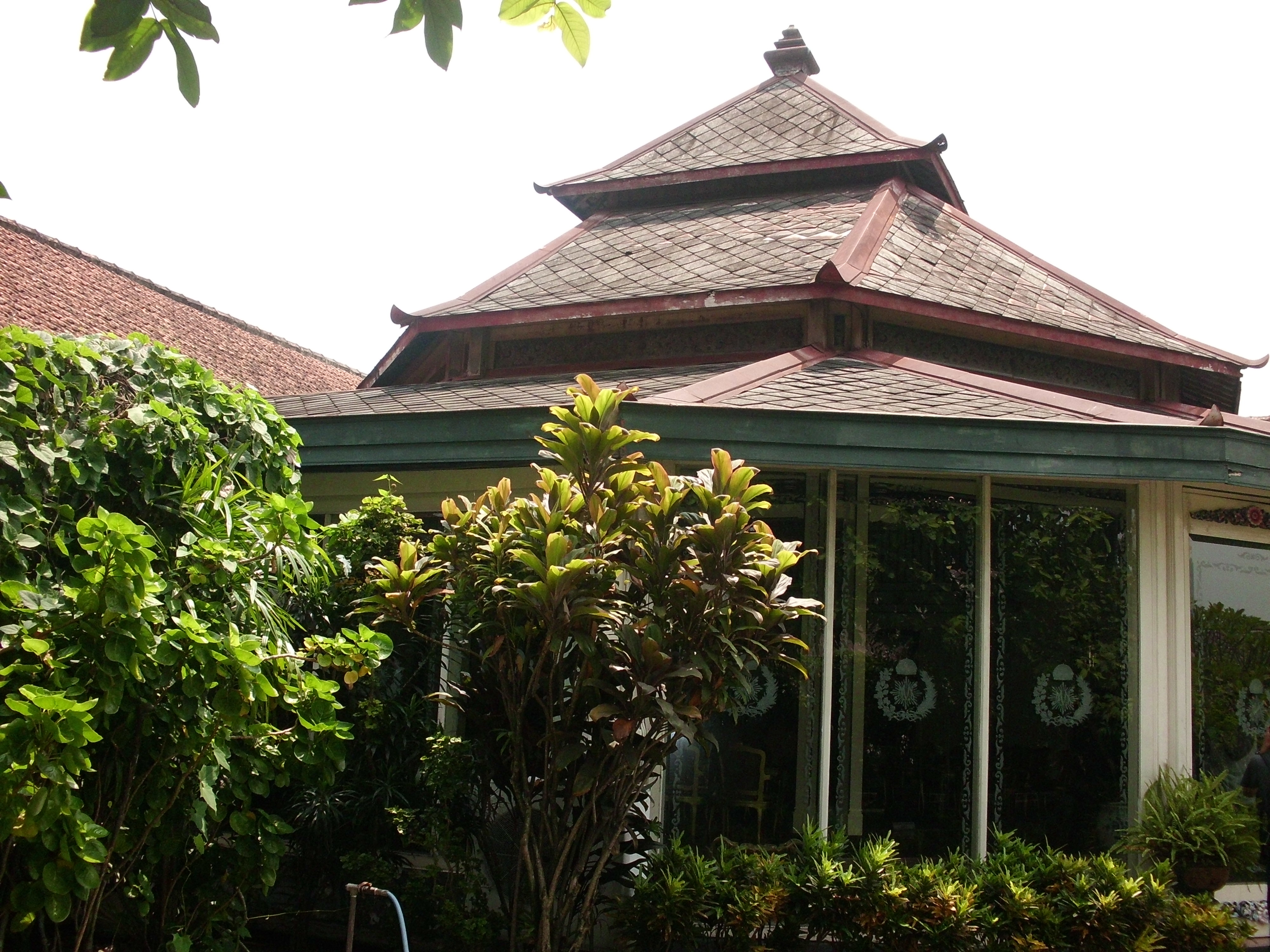
Pavilion of Gusti Nurul

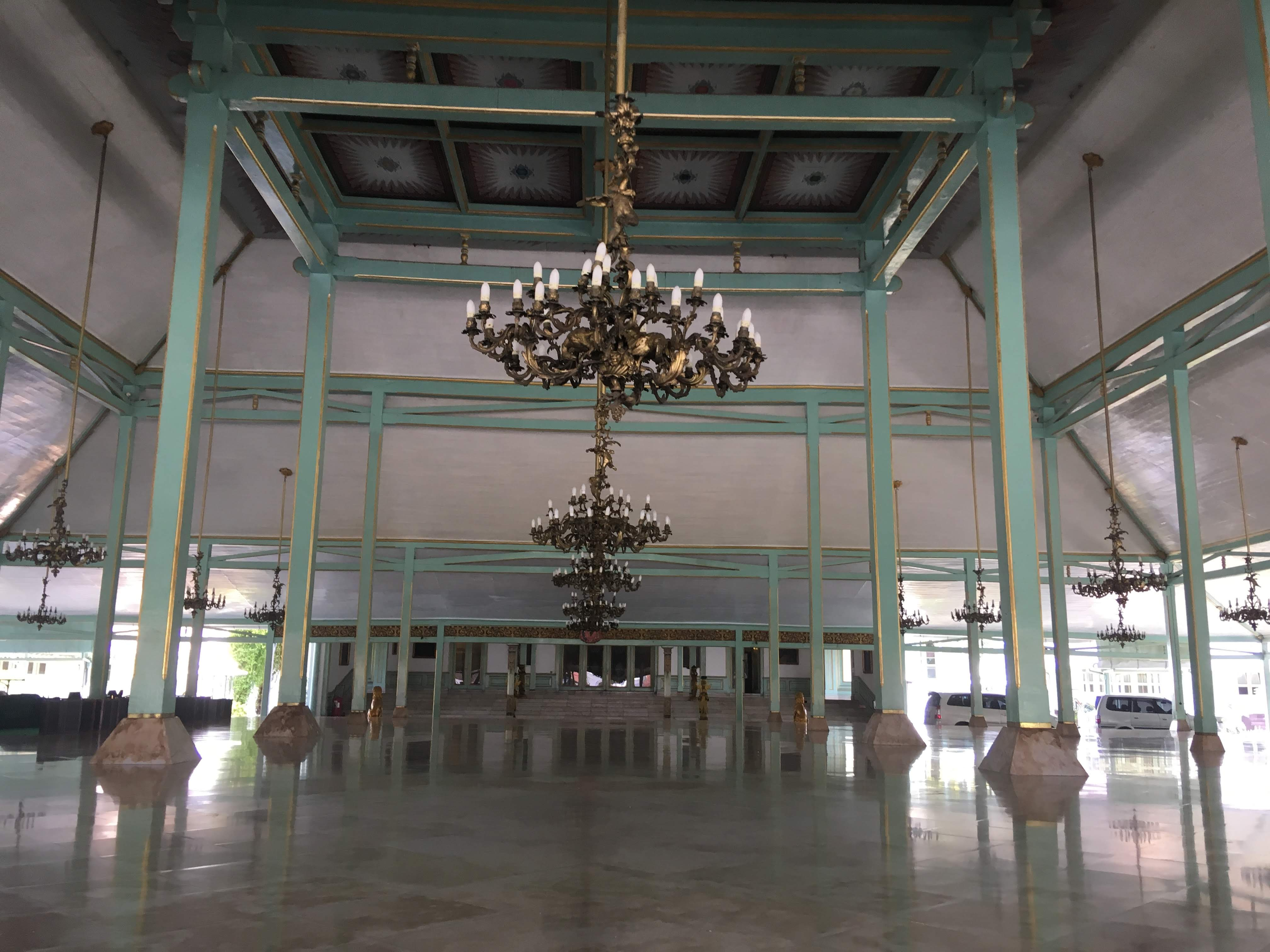
Grand Hall of the Pura Mangkunegaran

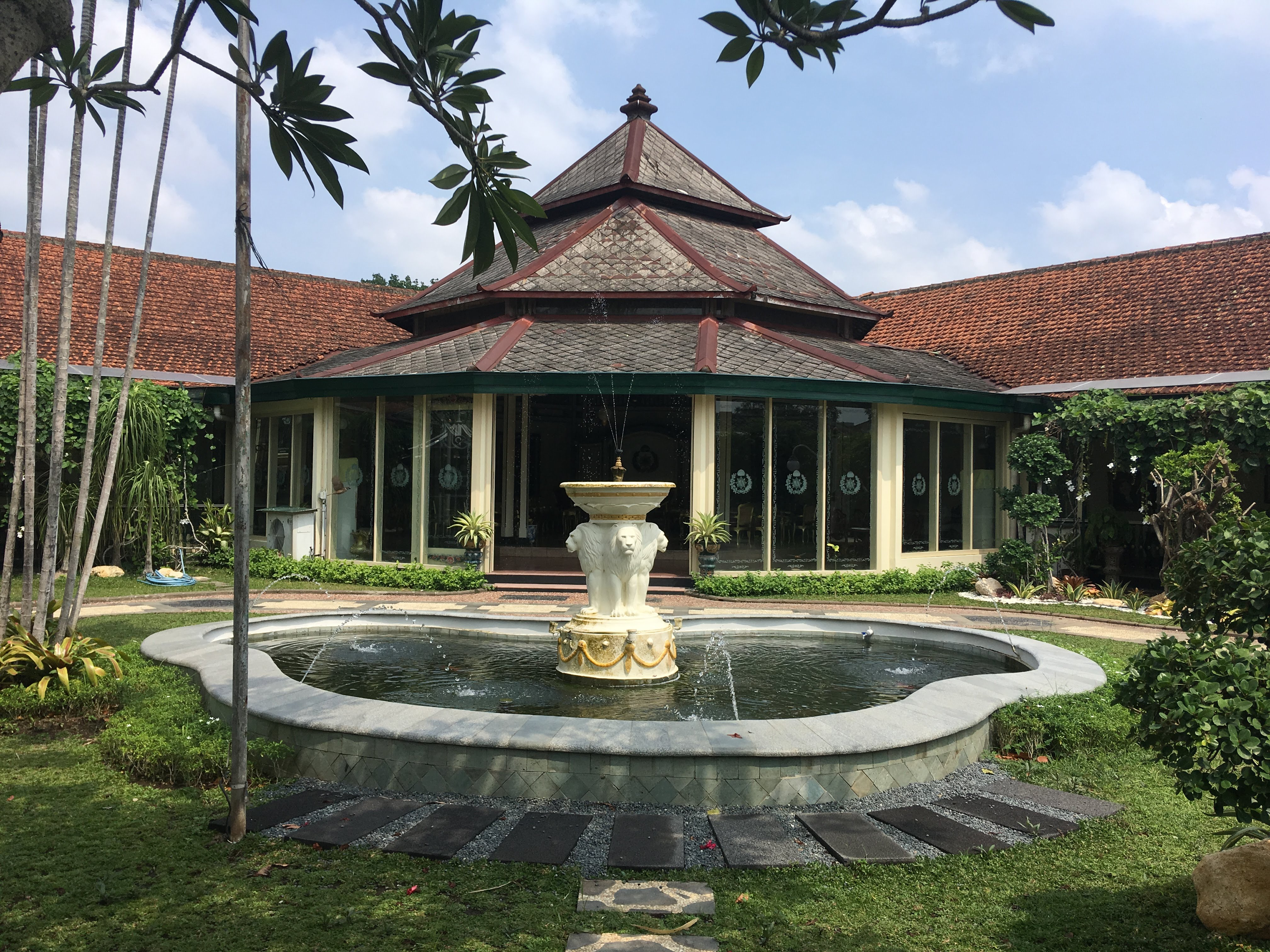
Garden inside Mangkunegaran Palace

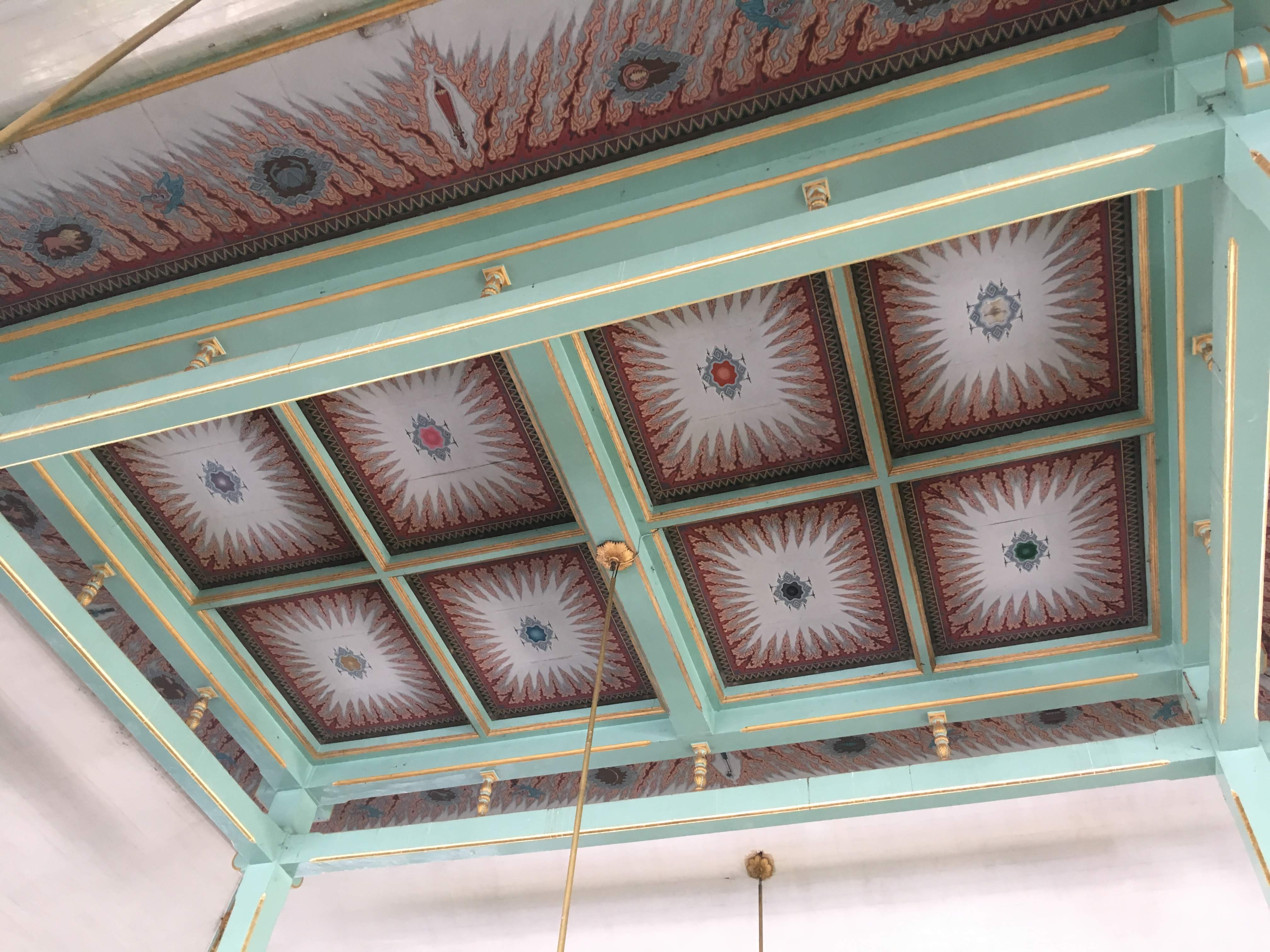
Ceiling of the Grand Hall

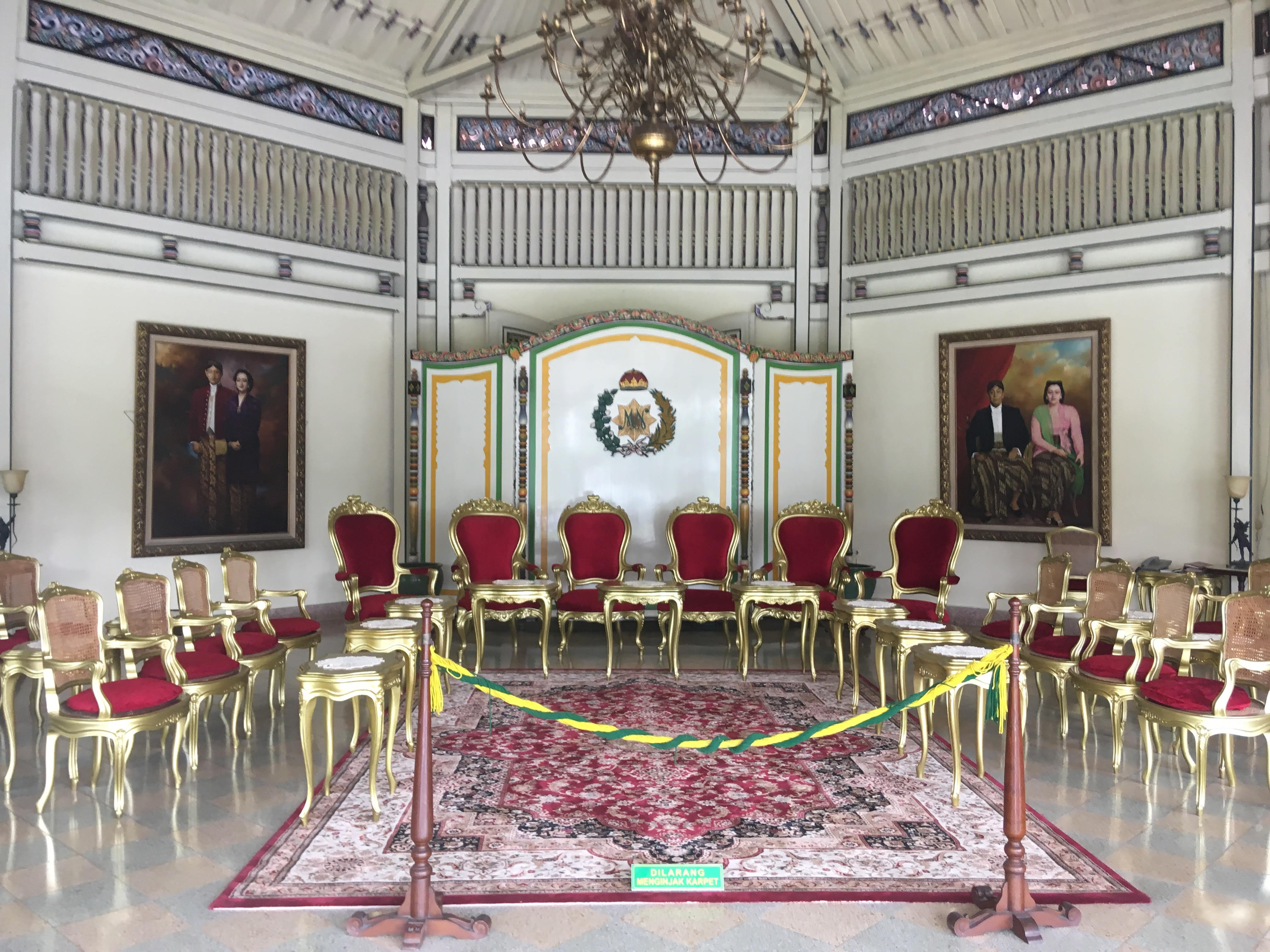
Interior of Gusti Nurul Pavilion (Pracimayasa) in Pura Mangkunegaran complex

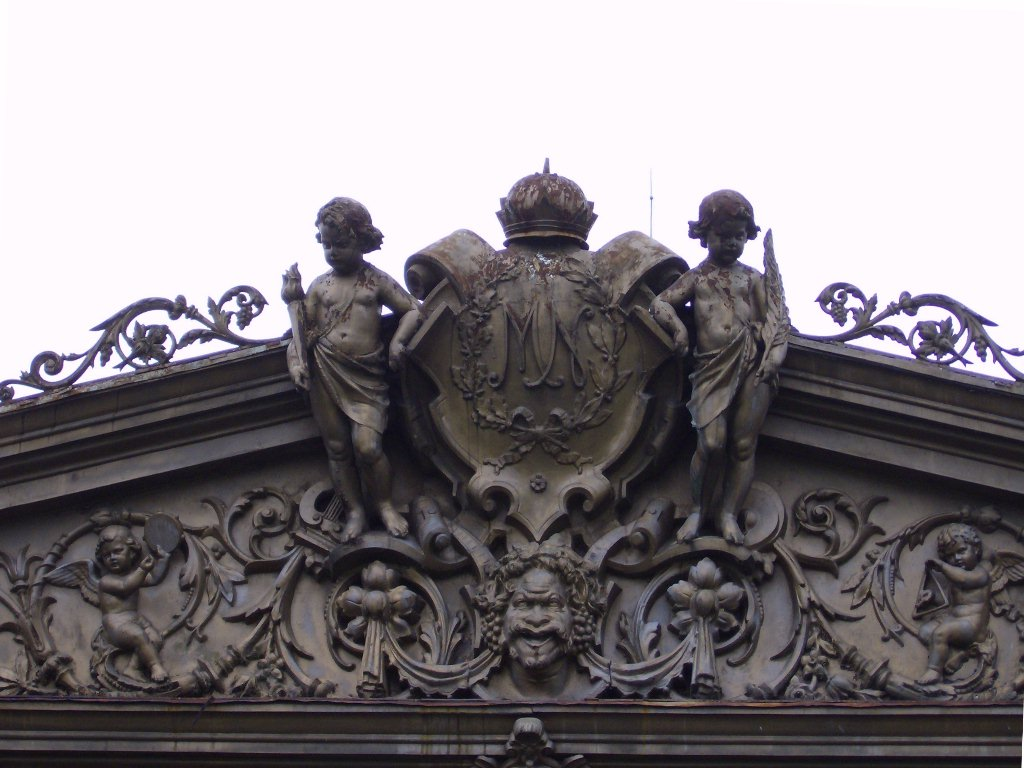
Pura Mangkunagaran coat of arms flanked by European style cherubs and a Dhwarapala

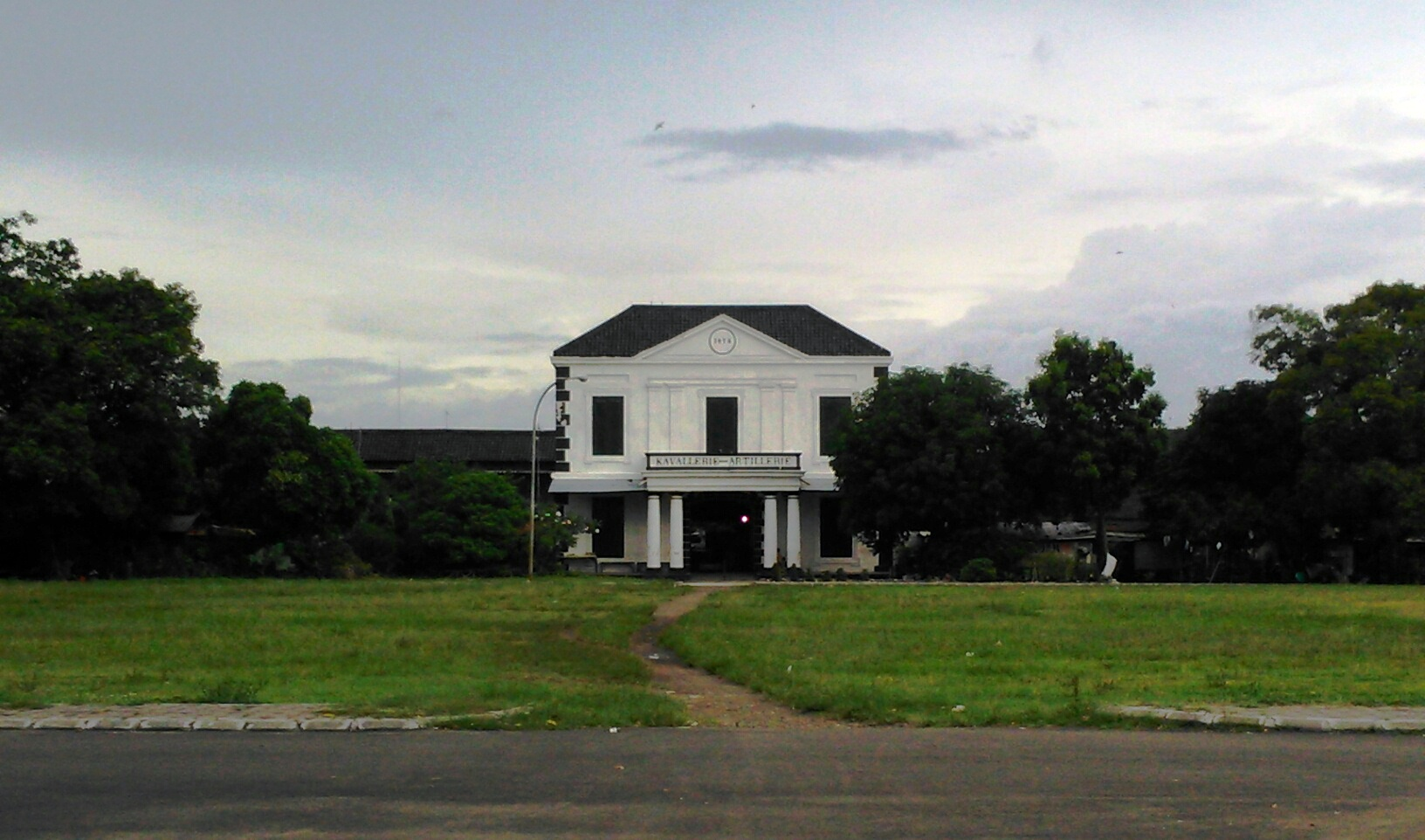
Courtyard of Mangkunegaran Palace with Cavalry-Artillery camp as background

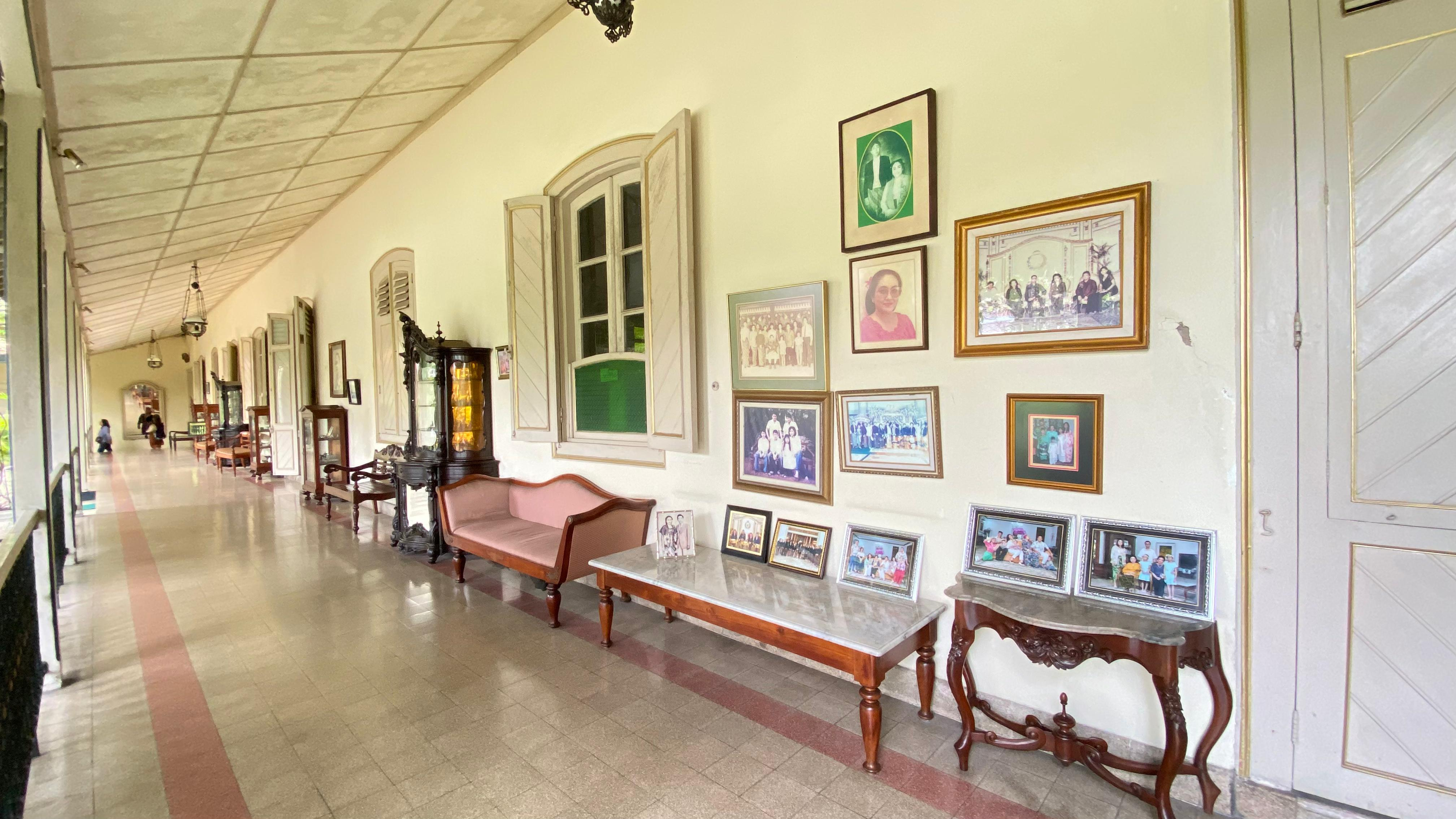
Mangkunegaran family photo gallery

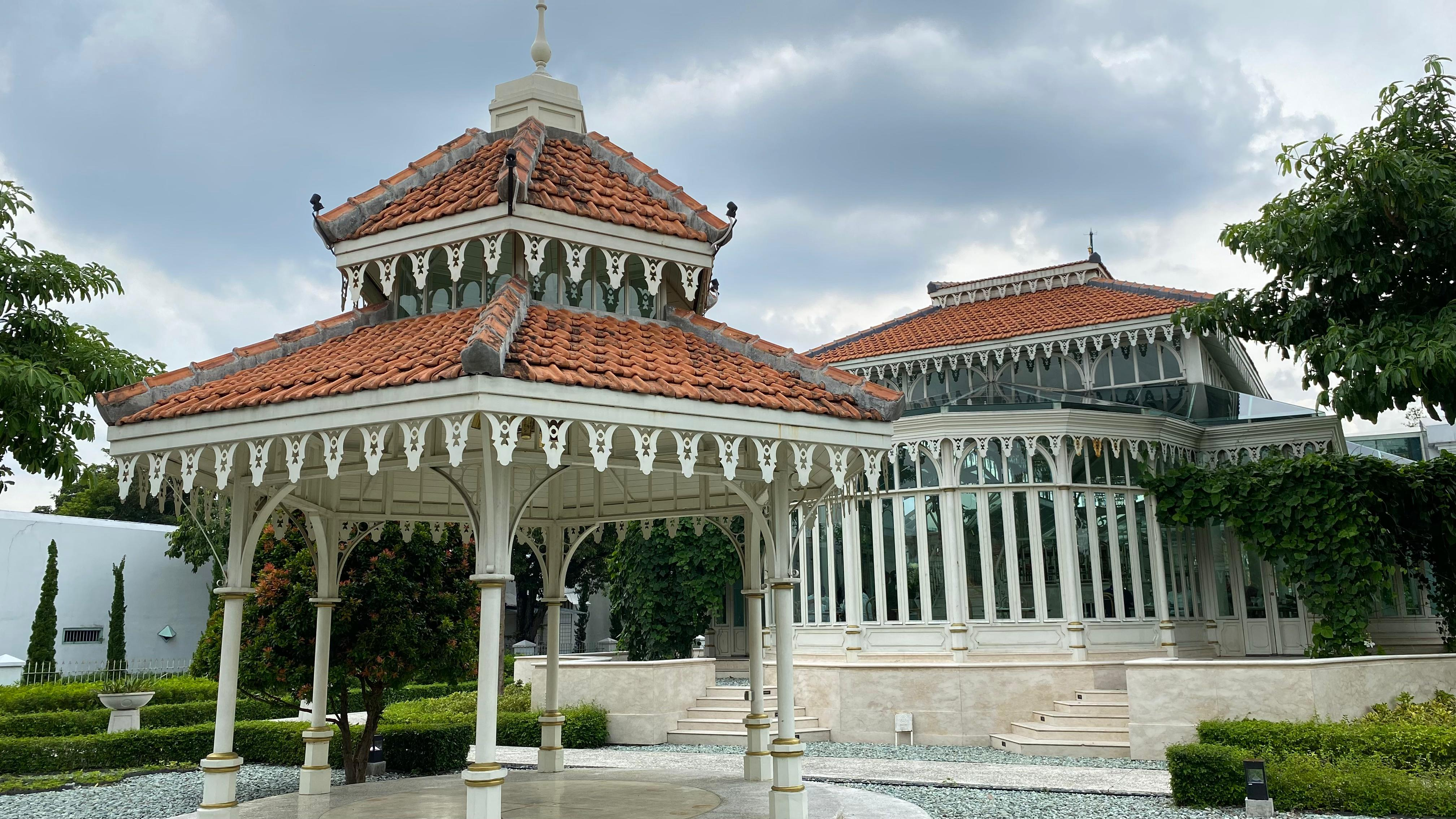
Pracima Tuin

== See also ==
- The Duchy of Mangkunegaran
- Kraton Surakarta
- Kraton Yogyakarta
- Pura Pakualaman
- Surakarta
