= Oen Boen Ing =

Indonesian physician (1903–1982)

Member of the Supreme Advisory Council
- In office December 1949 – August 1950

Personal details
- Born: 3 March 1903 Salatiga, Dutch East Indies
- Died: 30 October 1982 (aged 79) Semarang, Central Java, Indonesia
- Education: STOVIA
- Occupation: Physician

Chinese name
- Traditional Chinese: 溫文英
- Simplified Chinese: 温文英
Transcriptions
Standard Mandarin
- Hanyu Pinyin: Wēn Wényīng
- Wade–Giles: Wen^{1} Wen^{2}ying^{1}
Southern Min
- Hokkien POJ: Un Bûn-eng

Oen Boen Ing (simplified Chinese: 温文英; traditional Chinese: 溫文英; Pe̍h-ōe-jī: Un Bûn-eng, 3 March 1903 – 30 October 1982) was an Indonesian physician. Born to a tobacco entrepreneur in Salatiga, the Dutch East Indies, he assisted his grandfather with traditional Chinese medicine from a young age. Despite his family's opposition, he enrolled at STOVIA in Batavia (now Jakarta) in 1922, receiving formal medical training while simultaneously engaging in the Chinese nationalist organization Chung Hsioh. Oen received his medical licence in 1932, then moved to the east Javan town of Kediri to run a clinic.

In early 1935, Oen left Kediri for the central Javan city of Surakarta, where he opened a private practice while simultaneously working at the Ziekenzorg Hospital (now Dr Moewardi Regional Hospital Surakarta) and a clinic operated by the benevolent association Hua Chiao Tsien Ning Hui (HCTNH). He was appointed doctor to the Mangkunegaran Court in 1944, and during the Indonesian National Revolution (1945–1949) he provided treatment to republican forces. In 1952, after some time as a member of the Supreme Advisory Council, Oen oversaw the incorporation of the HCTNH clinic as the Tsi Sheng Yuan Clinic; it was renamed the Panti Kosala Hospital in 1965. He continued his private practice through the mid-1970s.

Oen was recognized for his pro bono work and his willingness to pay for his patients' prescriptions. For his contributions to Mangkunegaran, he was granted a noble title. The government of Indonesia, meanwhile, granted him the Satyalancana Kebaktian Sosial – a national award – in 1975 for his treatment of revolutionaries. After his death, the Panti Kosala Hospital was renamed the Dr. Oen Hospital.

== Early life ==
Oen was born on 3 March 1903 in Salatiga, Central Java, Dutch East Indies, the fourth of eight children. His grandfather was a sinshe (practitioner of traditional Chinese medicine), while his father Oen Hwie An owned a cigarette company. The Oen family was wealthy and well-read, and thus Oen read works of Sino-Malay literature as well as the daily Sin Po. He completed his primary education at a Hollandsch Chineesche School in Salatiga, then moved to Semarang for his MULO (junior high school) studies. His secondary education was completed at an AMS (senior high school) in Yogyakarta. Frequently observing his grandfather's practice and helping him with patients, Oen wanted to become a doctor; by the age of seven, he had memorized the names of numerous medicinal plants.

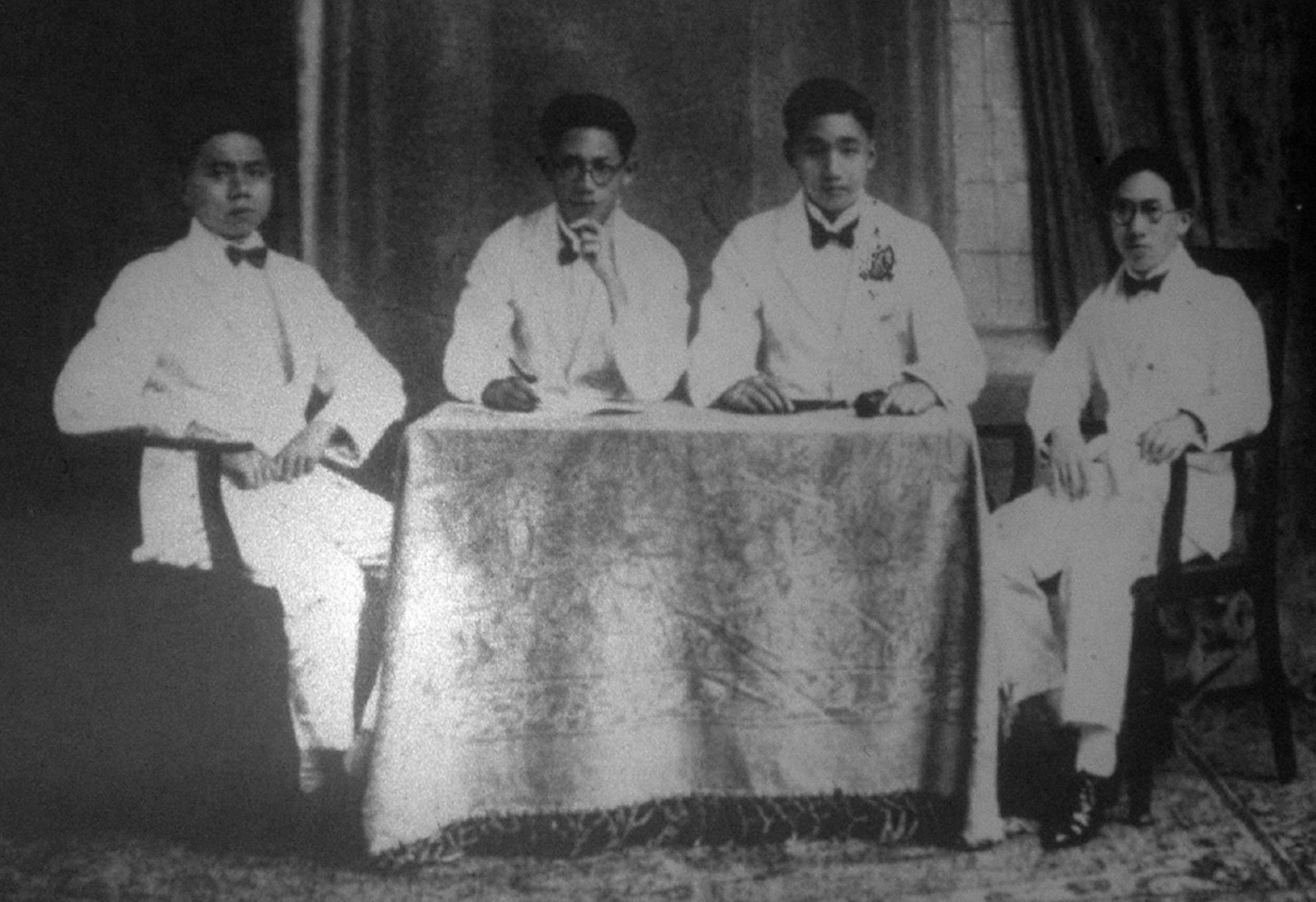
Oen (far right) with the board of directors of the Chung Hsioh, 1926

In a 1976 article, Oen recalled that his family had initially opposed formal medical training, desiring instead that he take over his father's company. His grandfather, he wrote, feared that he would focus more on earning income than treating the sick. Oen, feeling that he was ill-suited for entrepreneurship, chose to pursue his medical education and enroled at STOVIA in Batavia (now Jakarta) in 1922. During his studies, he often engaged in discussions with Moewardi and Mohammad Roem, who later became engaged in the Indonesian nationalist movement, and Ang Jan Goan and Kwa Tjoan Sioe, who participated in Chinese nationalist movements. Through his friendship with Kwa, the founder of the Jang Seng Ie Hospital (now Husada Hospital) in Batavia, Oen was able to gain practical experience practising medicine between 1928 and 1929.

Oen also became politically active, joining Chung Hsioh, a youth organization that – like the earlier Tiong Hoa Hwee Koan (THHK) – sought to promote Chinese culture among the ethnic Chinese population of the Dutch East Indies. Oen was on the organization's board of directors between July and December 1926. He also edited the organization's monthly bulletin, the Orgaan der Centrale Chung Hsioh ("Organ of the National Chung Hsioh"). Despite not speaking any Chinese dialects, Oen was fluent in Dutch, Malay, Javanese, French, and German; he thus translated articles on the Chinese nationalist movement, the Japanese invasion of China, and the cultures of Europe.

== Practice and Surakarta ==
Oen graduated from STOVIA in 1932 and established a medical practice in Kediri, funded by the Chinese-Indonesian benevolent organization Hua Chiao Tsien Ning Hui (HCTNH). In that east Javanese town, where medical care had been lacking, he met Corrie Djie Nio, the daughter of the majoor cina in the region; the two were married on 16 November 1934. In early 1935, Oen moved to Surakarta, in central Java. A farewell gala was held by HCTNH in April, with chairman Tan Khoen Swie praising Oen's charitable work. The clinic was closed through July, as a replacement for Oen had not been hired.

In Surakarta, Oen became an assistant doctor at the Ziekenzorg Hospital (now Dr Moewardi Regional Hospital Surakarta); by the late 1930s, he had also become a doctor at a clinic established by the HCTNH's Surakarta branch. Some years later, he opened his own clinic at his home in the Banjarsari area. He also became engaged with the local branch of the THHK, organizing artistic performances, sports tournaments, and fun fairs. Oen was in this position when the Empire of Japan began its occupation of the archipelago in 1941. Unlike many members of the ethnic Chinese community, Oen was not detained, instead being allowed to continue his private practice.

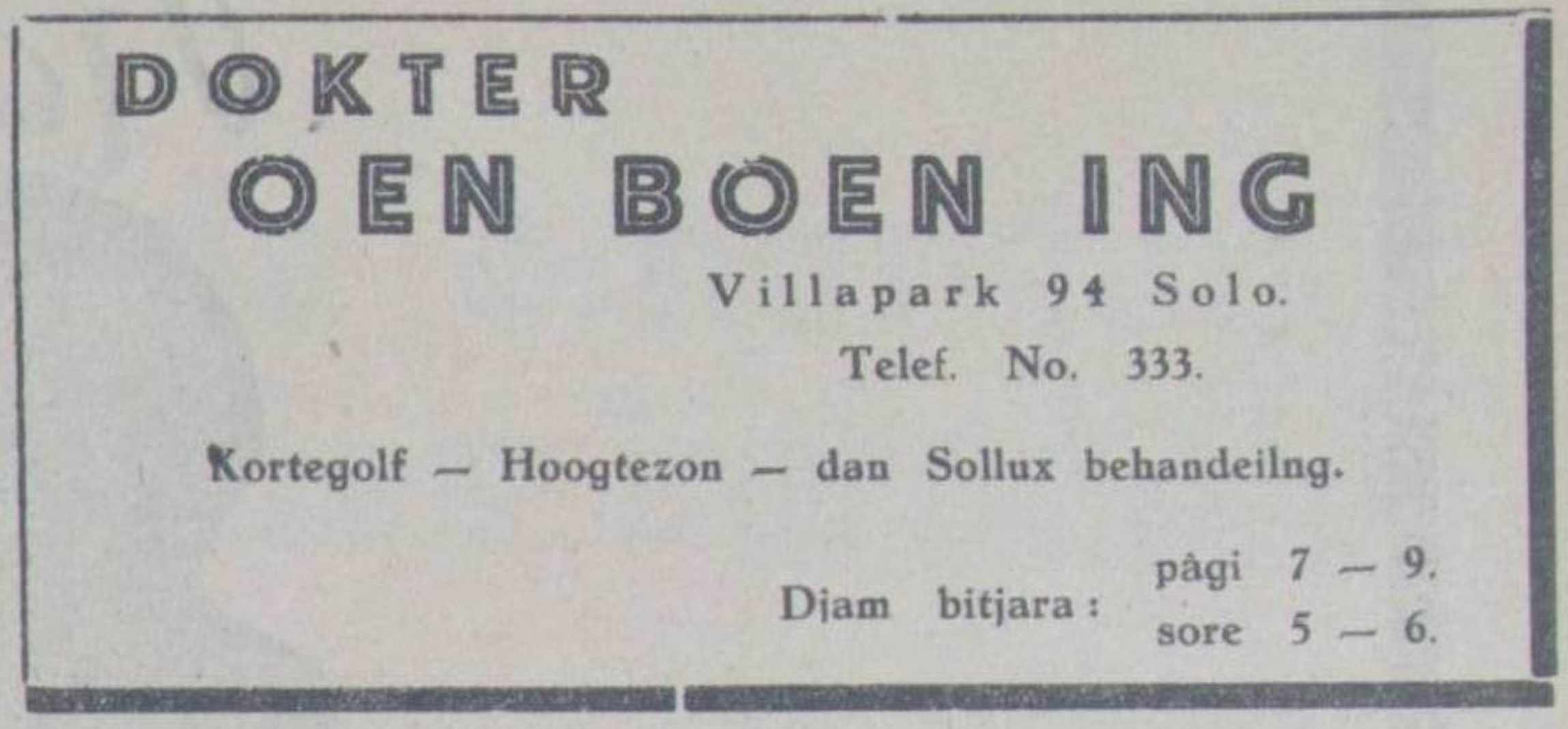
An advertisement for Oen's private practice, 1940

After Indonesia proclaimed its independence, Oen remained in Surakarta. During the ensuing Indonesian National Revolution (1945–1949), wherein Indonesian republicans fought against returning Dutch colonial forces, he was known to treat members of the Tentara Pelajar – sometimes entering areas of active conflict to treat combatants. He also secured penicillin for General Sudirman, who had been diagnosed with tuberculosis in 1948, and assisted with Red Cross operations in the area.

Due to his revolutionary activities, Oen drew the attention of Dutch military intelligence. At the same time, he gained a reputation as someone who could readily interact with people of all backgrounds, known to treat more than 200 patients every day, half of them receiving medical services pro bono. So great was his popularity that, when violence against the ethnic Chinese erupted in Surakarta, the Indonesian government received a petition for Oen to remain in the city to continue his practice rather than be evacuated. In December 1949, Oen was appointed by President Sukarno to the Supreme Advisory Council tasked with advising him in discharging his duties; the council was dissolved in August 1950 as part of the adoption of the Provisional Constitution.

== Court doctor and Panti Kosala ==
In 1944, during the Japanese occupation, Oen was appointed the doctor of the Mangkunegaran Court. As court doctor, Oen was responsible for the health of everyone from the prince through the courtiers. He was the personal physician of Gusti Nurul, the daughter of Prince Mangkunegara VII. He established a personal friendship with Prince Mangkunegara VIII, who made him a court official on 11 September 1975 and gave him the title Kanjeng Raden Tumenggung Obi Darmohusodo; the name "Obi" was an initialism of Oen's birth name. Oen assisted with the births of all of the prince's children. This included Prince Mangkunegara IX, upon whom he bestowed the Chinese name Wu Yi. He did not accept payment for his work with the court.

Through the 1950s, Oen remained active with the CHTH's Surakarta branch. He served on the council of its president, Kwik Thiam Hwat, and initiated annual commemorations of the People's Republic of China and its establishment. He organized a series of cultural activities, including not only performances by the soprano Sylvia Chang Ching Yia and pianist Oey Tjong Lee, as well as the ballet dancer Elsie San Fang Tjiok, but also customary culture such as wayang potehi (glove puppetry), the lion dance, and the dragon dance. He and Corrie travelled to China in 1952, two of dozens of prominent Chinese Indonesians invited by the Overseas Chinese Affairs Office to survey the situation in the country; over the course of two months, he observed the practice of traditional and western medicine in the country.

Meanwhile, Oen continued to practise medicine at the HCTNH clinic. When the organization pulled its funding in 1951, Oen began the process of incorporating the clinic. He found twenty-two donors, and on 31 August 1952 the clinic was renamed Tsi Sheng Yuan (under the Tsi Sheng Yuan Health Foundation). The clinic began to expand, acquiring 2 hectares (4.9 acres) of land in Mojosongo (now Kandangsapi) in 1954. Construction of a new hospital, at first funded by Jamu Jago, began the following year; by 1982 it had 170 beds. On 28 December 1965, amidst backlash against the ethnic Chinese community following the failed coup of 30 September, the Tsi Sheng Yuan Health Foundation was renamed the Panti Kosala Health Foundation. Oen practised at the hospital three days per week.

Oen's home practice also continued. Beginning at 3:00 a.m. Western Indonesia Time and lasting until after noon, Oen would see patients personally, often without any assistance. After making a diagnosis, he prepared prescriptions, with those he stamped and signed to be redeemed at a specific pharmacist and paid out of his own pocket. Patients who could pay for his services were merely asked to put money in a box near the door. Oen argued that all patients should be treated as equals, and that doctors "should be imbued with the spirit of service and put the patient's safety above all else." In this, Lo Siaw Ging considered Oen a mentor, and attributed his own pro bono practice to Oen's social mindedness and charity.

By 1976, Oen's health was deteriorating, and he had reduced his home practice to two days per week. He fell into a coma in April 1977. Oen died at Telogorejo Hospital, Semarang, on 30 October 1982. His body was brought to the Panti Kosala Hospital, where it lay in state. On 5 November, the Mangkunegaran Court held a funeral ceremony, led by Prince Mangkunegara VIII. A minute of silence was observed under the guidance of Mayor Soekatmo Prawirohadisebroto. Thousands of people lined the streets as Oen's body was escorted by palace officials to Tiong Ting Crematorium in a procession led by Sanyoto Sutopo Hadikusumo. He was survived by Corrie; the couple had no children.

== Legacy ==
On 30 October 1979, Oen received the Satyalancana Kebaktian Sosial for his service to the Tentara Pelajar during the revolution. The Panti Kosala Hospital was renamed the Dr. Oen Hospital on 30 October 1983, commemorating his service to the hospital and Surakarta; a statue of Oen was dedicated at the hospital on 3 March 2003. During a 24 January 1993 ceremony, the Mangkunegaran Court granted Oen the title Kandjeng Raden Mas Toemenggoeng Hario Obi Darmohoesodo, one level higher than that Oen had received during his lifetime. In 2017, a biography of Oen was written by Ravando Lie and published by Kompas.

Regarding Oen's acceptance in the Mangkunegaran Court, the historian RM Daradjadi writes that the doctor's personal philosophy was similar to the Javanese concept of sepi ing pamrih rame ing gawe ("working with dedication without expecting material rewards"). Darmadjadi also links Oen's practice with the three values espoused by Prince Mangkunegara I in his Serat Wedhatama: rumangsa melu handarbeni ("sense of shared ownership"), melu hangrungkebi ("shared accountability"), and malat sarira hangrasa wani ("willingness to improve oneself"). Ravando Lie echoes this observation, noting that Oen's practice accorded with the Javanese philosophy of mamayu hayuning bawana, amemangun karyenak tyasing sesama ("to build this world is to make other people happy").

== Works cited ==
- "Dokter Oen Meninggal Dunia: Dermawan dan Tak Pernah Minta Bayaran" [Doctor Oen Dies: Philanthropist Who Never Asked for Payment]. Kompas (in Indonesian). Jakarta. 1 November 1982. p. 1.
- Herdadian, Herdiona Hellen; Widyanta, Danar (2024). "Oen Boen Ing's Role During Indonesian Independence Revolution Period on 1945–1949". Historica (in Indonesian). 8 (1): 1–19. doi:10.19184/jh.v8i1.44600 (inactive 12 July 2025).
- Lie, Ravando (2017). "Dr Oen Boen Ing: Patriot Doctor, Social Activist, and Doctor of the Poor" (PDF). Wacana. 18 (2): 455–484. doi:10.17510/wacana.v18i2.592.
- Nafi, Bagus Zidni Ilman (24 March 2017). "Dr Oen, Ya Dokter, Ya Pejuang..." [Dr Oen, a Doctor, a Warrior...]. Kompas (in Indonesian). Archived from the original on 14 June 2024.
- Rosa, May Citra (10 January 2024). "Sosok Dokter Lo Siaw Ging, Kedermawanan dan Pesan Terakhinya" [On Doctor Lo Siaw Ging, His Charity, and His Final Request]. Kompas (in Indonesian). Archived from the original on 14 June 2024.
- Sardiman (2008). Guru Bangsa: Sebuah Biografi Jenderal Sudirman [Teacher of the People: A Biography of General Sudirman] (in Indonesian). Yogyakarta: Ombak. ISBN 978-979-3472-92-8.
- Suryadinata, Leo, ed. (2015). "Darmohusodo, K.R.T. Obi". Prominent Indonesian Chinese: Biographical Sketches (4th ed.). Singapore: Institute of Southeast Asian Studies. p. 20. ISBN 9789814345217.
- Wisnuwidodo, Andryanto (15 April 2022). "Dr Oen, Dokter Pejuang Kemerdekaan, Penolong Wong Cilik hingga Jenderal Sudirman" [Dr Oen, Doctor Fighting for Freedom, Helper of Common People through General Sudirman]. Sindo News (in Indonesian). Archived from the original on 14 April 2022.
- "Undang-undang (UU) No. 7 Tahun 1950 Perubahan Konstitusi Sementara Republik Indonesia Serikat menjadi Undang-Undang Dasar Sementara Republik Indonesia" [Law No. 7 of 1950 regarding the Conversion of the Provisional Constitution of the United States of Indonesia into the Provisional Constitution of the Republic of Indonesia] (in Indonesian). Government of Indonesia. 15 August 1950. Archived from the original on 18 May 2024.
- "Ziekenhuis Gie Sing Wan" [Gie Sing Wan Clinic]. De Locomotief. Semarang. 30 July 1935. p. 4.
