= Gambyong =

Indonesian traditional dance

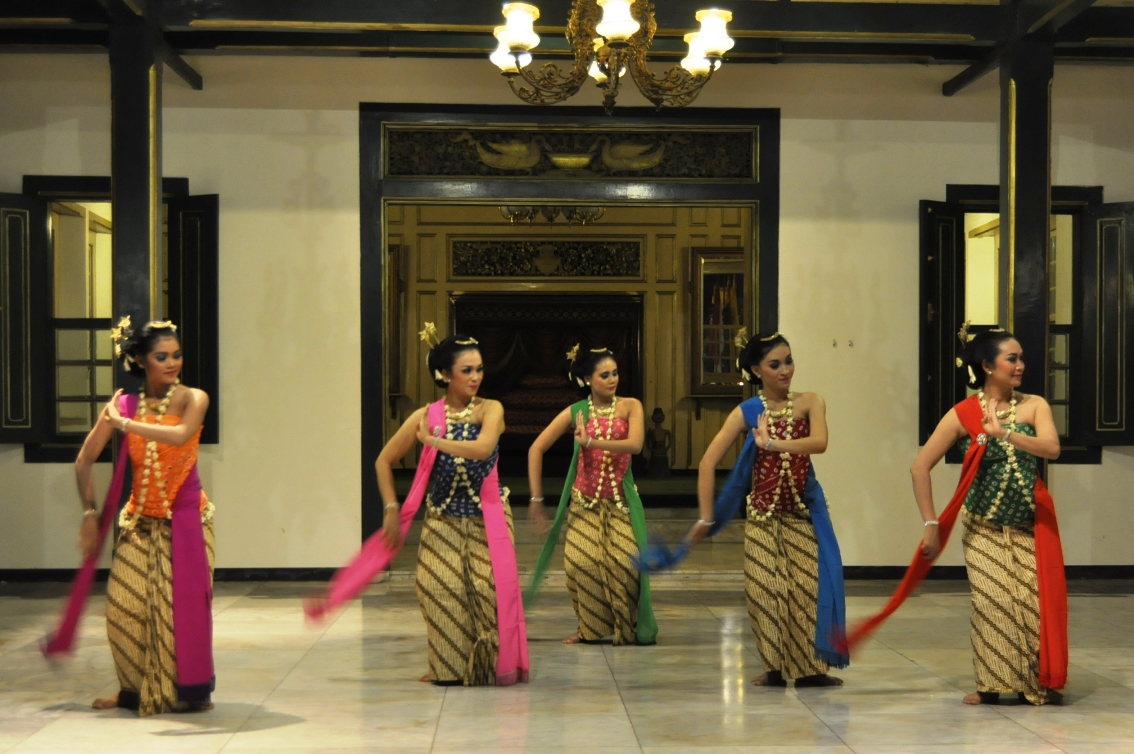
- Gambyong Langenkusuma (Pangkur version of Mangkunegaran Palace) dancers
- Native name: ꦒꦩ꧀ꦧꦾꦺꦴꦁ (Javanese); Tari Gambyong (Indonesian)
- Genre: Traditional dance
- Instrument: Gamelan
- Inventor: Javanese people
- Origin: Surakarta (Indonesia)

Gambyong (Javanese: ꦒꦩ꧀ꦧꦾꦺꦴꦁ) is a traditional Javanese dance originating from Surakarta, Central Java, Indonesia. It has existed since ancient times, and began to be displayed at the Mangkunegaran Palace in the era of 1916 to 1944. Gambyong became famous for its smooth and graceful dance moves that amazed the audience who watch them.

== History ==
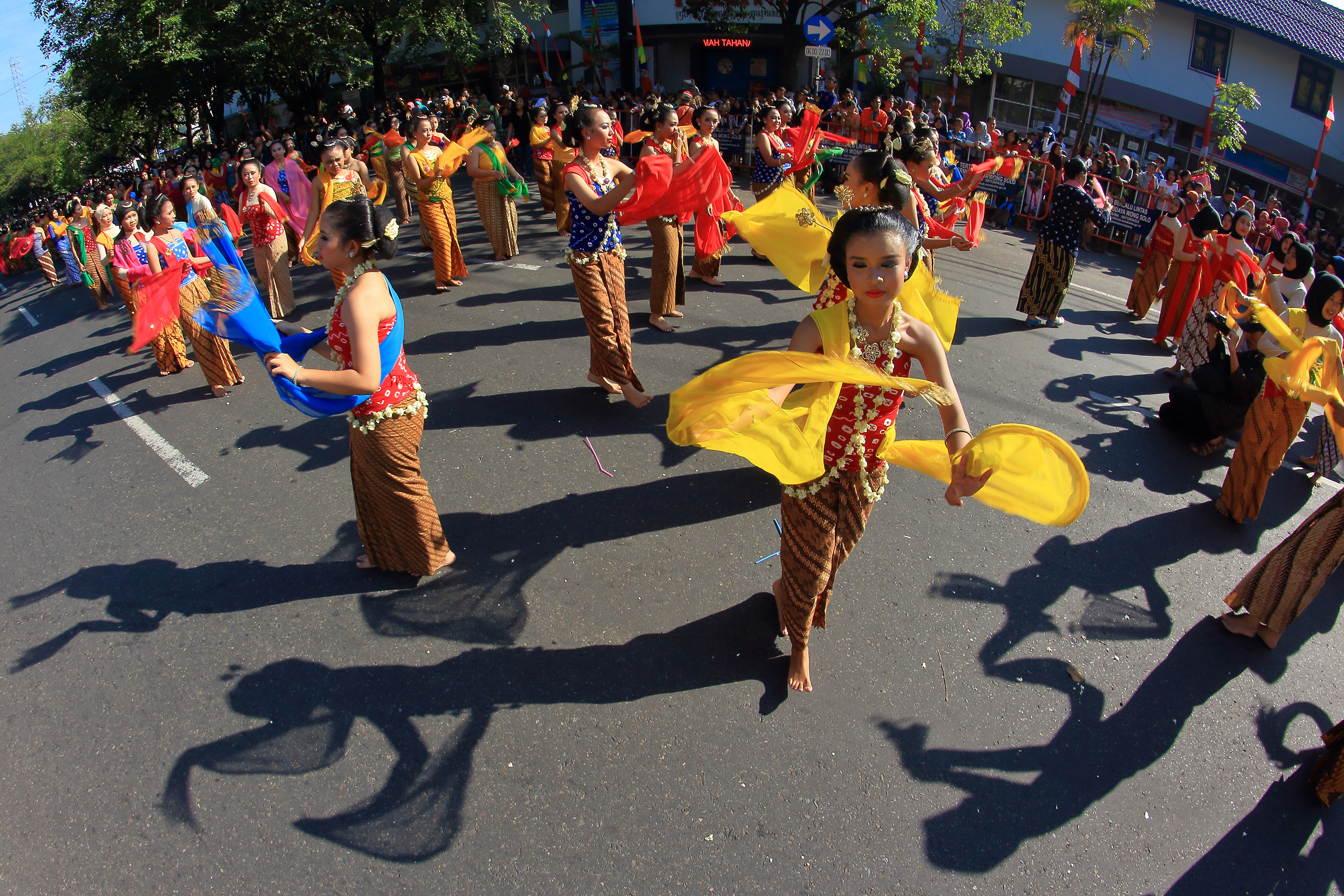
The colossal performance of 5,000 gambyong dancers in Surakarta

The Serat Centini, a Javanese book written during the reigns of Pakubuwana IV (1788-1820) and Pakubuwana V (1820-1823), mentioned the existence of gambyong as a tledhek dance. At that time, one of the dance stylists in the reign of Pakubuwana IX (1861-1893) named K.R.M.T. Wreksadiningrat worked on this folk dance so that it was appropriate to be performed among the nobles or aristocrats.

This refined folk dance became popular and was usually performed in front of guests at the Mangkunegaran Palace.

An important change in Gambyong Dance occurred when in 1950, Nyi Bei Mintoraras, a dance trainer from the Mangkunegaran Palace during the Mangkunegara VIII period, created a "standardized" version of gambyong, known as Gambyong Pareanom.

This choreography was first performed at the wedding ceremony of Gusti Nurul, Mangkunegara VIII's sister, in 1951. This dance was liked by the public, so that further variations were developed for public consumption.

== Meaning ==
The meaning of Gambyong is likened to a rice goddess (Dewi Sri) who is dancing. Therefore, in the past this dance was performed during agricultural ritual ceremonies to ensure rice fertility and an abundant harvest.

In its development, Gambyong dance has been appointed as an entertainment to enliven the wedding reception, to welcome guests of honor or state.

== Form and movement ==
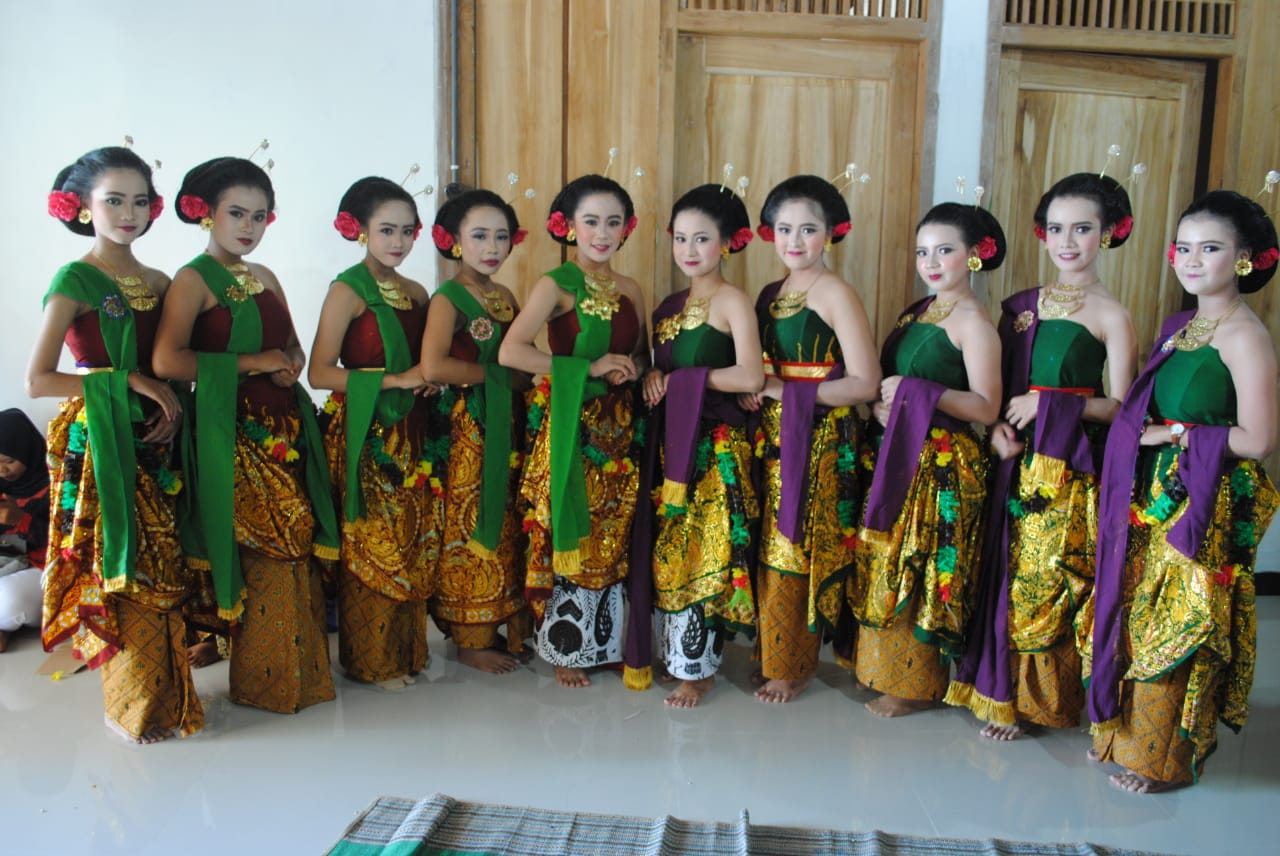
Gambyong dancer clothes

The characteristics of the Gambyong dance include:

- The clothes used are shades of yellow and green as a symbol of prosperity and fertility.
- Before the dance begins, it is always opened with a gendhing Pangkur.
- Movement techniques, dance accompaniment rhythms and kendang (Indonesian drum) patterns are able to display the dance characters that are flexible.

Gambyong dance movement consists of three parts, namely the beginning (awal), content (isi), and end (akhir). The uniqueness of the Gambyong dance is in the movement that focuses on the legs, arms, body, and also the head. The movement accompanies or follows every hand movement by looking at the direction of the fingers. Every movement even goes hand in hand with the music that is sung.

The opening dance is also accompanied by Gendhing Pangkur. Then this rhythm makes the movement techniques performed by the dancers with flexibility. Usually, the dancers of the Gambyong Dance are equipped with a bun. Even so, their appearance is still elegant and shows a graceful expression.

== See also ==
- Bedhaya
- Lengger
- Javanese dance
- Dance in Indonesia
