= Mangkunegara X =

10th Prince of Mangkunegaran Principality (since 2022)

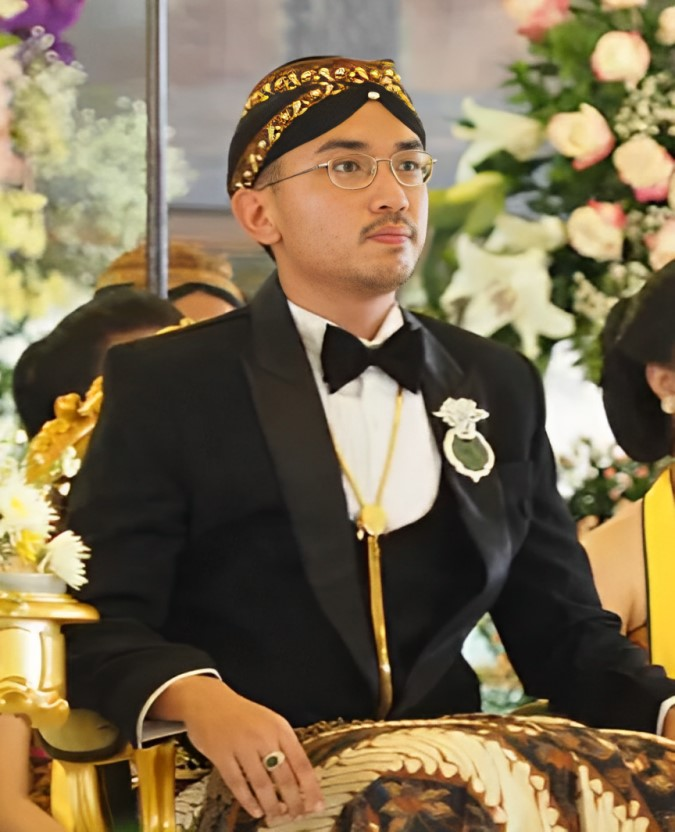
- Mangkunegara X in 2022.

10th Duke of Mangkunegaran
- Reign: 12 March 2022 – now
- Predecessor: Mangkunegara IX
- President: Joko Widodo; Prabowo Subianto
- Born: Bhre Cakrahutomo Wira Sudjiwo; March 29, 1997 (age 29) (Javanese: 20 Sela 1929 Wawu)
Names
- ꧋ꦱꦩ꧀ꦥꦼꦪꦤ꧀ꦝꦊꦩ꧀ꦆꦁꦏꦁꦗꦸꦩꦼꦤꦼꦁꦏꦚ꧀ꦗꦼꦁꦒꦸꦱ꧀ꦠꦶꦥꦔꦺꦫꦤ꧀ꦄꦣꦶꦥꦠꦶꦄꦂꦪꦩꦁꦏꦸꦤꦒꦫꦆꦁꦏꦁꦗꦸꦩꦼꦤꦼꦁꦏꦥꦶꦁꦱꦼꦣꦱ; Sampeyan Dalem Ingkang Jumeneng Kanjeng Gusti Pangeran Adipati Arya Mangkunagara Ingkang Jumeneng Kaping Sedasa
- Javanese: ꦩꦁꦏꦸꦤꦒꦫ꧇꧑꧐꧇
- House: Mataram
- Father: Mangkunegara IX
- Mother: Prisca Marina Haryogi Supardi
- Religion: Roman Catholicism (1997–2022); Sunni Islam (2022–present)
- Education: Universitas Indonesia
- Voice of Mangkunegara X Pidato Mangkunegara X pada Pengukuhannya sebagai Adipati Baru Mangkunegaran. Direkam pada 12 Maret 2022

Prince Mangkunegara X, 10th Duke of Mangkunegaran (Javanese: ꦩꦁꦏꦸꦤꦒꦫ꧇꧑꧐꧇; born 29 March 1997), also known as Gusti Bhre, is the 10th ceremonial monarch of Mangkunegaran since 2022, succeeding his father, Mangkunegara IX.

== Early life ==
Bhre Cakrahutomo Wira Sudjiwo was born on March 29, 1997, and is the youngest son of Prince Mangkunegara IX and Gusti Kangjeng Putri Mangkunegara IX (née Prisca Marina Haryogi Supardi). From his maternal lineage, he is the grandson of General Yogi Supardi who was the 10th Indonesian Ambassador to Japan (1987–1991), Pangdam XVI/Udayana (1972–1974), and Secretary General of the Department of Defense and Security (1983–1987). Before becoming a prince, he was often called by the name "Gusti Bhre".

He has a full sister named Gusti Raden Ajeng Ancillasura Marina Sudjiwo from his mother and two older stepsiblings from his stepmother Sukmawati Sukarnoputri: GPH Paundrakarna and GRA Putri Agung Suniwati.

He completed his undergraduate education at the Faculty of Law, University of Indonesia in 2019. Before being crowned as Pengageng Pura (ruler of the palace), Gusti Bhre had been involved in several Puro Mangkunegaran activities, such as being the Cucuk Lampah in the Kirab Pusaka tradition on the night of 1 Sura and the 2019 Mangkunegaran Jazz Festival.

== Duke of Mangkunegaran (since 2022) ==
=== Pre-coronation dynamics ===
The election of Gusti Bhre as Ruler faced twists and turns. As the son of the Princess Consort (official wife of the previous Mangkunegaran Prince), he was the prime candidate. However, the tradition of selecting the Mangkunegaran Prince did not follow such rules rigidly. The name Gusti Paundrakarna emerged as another candidate, as he is the eldest son of Mangkunegara IX, although he was not the son of the Princess Consort because his mother had divorced Mangkunegara IX before Mangkunegara IX ascended the throne. Besides GPH Paundrakarna, Kanjeng Roy Rahajasa Yamin was also considered a candidate, since he's the eldest son of the late Mangkunegara IX's older sister.

In addition to the issue of the order of succession, Gusti Bhre was also faced with the issue of his religious beliefs. As the successor to one of the dynasties of the Mataram lineage, the princes of Mangkunegaran have to be Muslim. Although no one spoke out openly, Gusti Bhre was a Catholic. However, Gusti Bhre is known to have converted from the Catholicism to Islam as a convert so that he is in accordance with the regulations for inauguration as a prince.

All these issues were then resolved after the circulation of an announcement from representatives of the core relatives signed by two of his father's siblings, Gusti Retno Satuti Suryohadiningrat and Gusti Retno Rosati Notohadiningrat, which in essence approved Gusti Bhre as the successor to the Principality.

=== Coronation ceremony ===
The coronation ceremony of Mangkunegara X was held on Saturday Pahing, March 12, 2022, at the Pendapa Ageng Pura Mangkunegaran. The coronation was carried out by Mangkunegara IX followed by the reading of the oath of allegiance and a welcoming speech by Mangkunegara X. The ceremony was attended by the President of Indonesia Joko Widodo, the three other rulers who were heirs to the Mataram throne (Pakubuwana XIII, Hamengkubuwana X, and Paku Alam X), the Governor of Central Java Ganjar Pranowo, and the Mayor of Surakarta Gibran Rakabuming Raka.

After taking the oath of allegiance, it was continued with a performance of the Bedhaya Anglirmendhung dance, a sacred dance created to commemorate the struggle of Mangkunegara I (Pangeran Sambernyawa) against the Dutch East India Company (VOC) until the establishment of Mangkunegaran.

=== Reign ===
==== Culture ====
Upon ascending to the throne, Mangkunegara X prioritized cultural policies that integrates digital technologies in an effort to preserve Javanese culture while adapting it to modern contexts, emphasizing greater accessibility for the younger generations. In a public lecture in University of Indonesia, Mangkunegara X highlighted how digitalization helps to achieve cultural missions by providing the tools needed, facilitates the branding of his principality, and disseminating Javanese customs. He states that his effort has boosted tourism with 300-400 visited Mangkunegaran during weekdays and over 1,000 during holidays. Apart from that, he also introduced several educational programs to youths in order to introduce the Mangkunegaran and its culture through music, arts and sports.

==== Economy & Tourism ====
During his inaugural speech, Mangkunegara X highlighted that tourism will be a key driver to the economic vitality for Mangkunegaran and to Surakarta in general. Mangkunegara X integrated traditional heritage with modern technology in order to attract tourism to Pura Mangkunegaran. Mangkunegara X enacted his "Culture Future" vision to revitalize historical sites with innovative experiences, such as inaugurating a night market in February 2025 during his third anniversary of rule to boost commerce and cultural engagements.

==== Mayoral bid ====
Approaching the 2024 Surakarta mayoral election, Mangkunegara X has been floated as a candidate to replace the outgoing mayor now Vice President Gibran Rakabuming Raka. In a grand coalition that excludes the Indonesian Democratic Party of Struggle, six political parties led by Gerindra discussed on nominating Mangkunegara X as a candidate, leveraging his title to appeal to local voters. In principle, the six parties (Gerindra, PSI, Golkar, PKS, PAN and PKB) agreed to nominate Mangkunegara X. The Indonesian Solidarity Party (PSI) specifically endorsed his candidacy along with a ticket pairing him with Astrid Widjayanti, chancellor of Surakarta University, in which the rest of the coalition members agreed to the pairing.

However, a day before the certification of candidates, Mangkunegara X unexpectedly withdrew from the race, citing personal reasons. It was reported that his family did not approve his decision to run for mayor. The grand coalition rushed to name Respati Ardi as his replacement despite having issued recommendation letters for Mangkunegara X's candidacy prior to his withdrawal. Mangkunegara X then endorsed his replacement, personally brought him to the General Elections Commission office in Surakarta.

Regnal titles
| Preceded by Mangkunegara IX | Ruler of Mangkunegaran | Succeeded by Incumbent |
