= Lo Siaw Ging =

Indonesian doctor in Central Java (1934–2024)

Lo Siaw Ging (born Thomas Becket Lo Siauw Ging; 16 August 1934 – 9 January 2024), known as Doctor Lo, was an Indonesian doctor in Surakarta, Central Java. He was notable for his pro bono practice, where he treated patients without payment for 50 years. He also paid the hospital bills of the poor.

== Biography ==
Siaw Ging was inspired by another Indonesian Chinese Doctor Oen Boen Ing (1903–1982), who, like Doctor Lo had a pro bono practice in Surakarta, where Lo met Oen, and learned about his humanitarian values.

According to his wife, Gan May Kwee, after qualifying, from Airlangga University in 1962, he contracted leptospirosis and came close to death. He regarded this as a sign from God and in 1968 opened his pro bono medical practice. Doctor Lo also said that his father had said that if he wished to become wealthy he should become a merchant, not a doctor.

Siaw Ging told the poor who had delayed attending his practice until they or their children were seriously ill that they should have come sooner because he would treat them free of charge. Patients reported that he would provide a code to receive free medication at dispensing pharmacy, or give them money in an envelope to pay for the prescription.

According to a neighbour, he would tell patients asking about fees at his practice "are you already wealthy? It's better you use your money to buy medication and educate your children" [than pay me for my services]. Although he did not charge his patients fees, some would leave an envelope in the amount of the patient's choosing.

During the May 1998 riots of Indonesia, where many Chinese businesses and individuals were targeted for racial violence, Lo kept his practice open despite an evacuation order, and said he would treat rioters and the slanted eyed (i.e. ethnic Chinese) both the same. His residence was protected by his neighbours from violence.

Siaw Ging was director of the Kasih Ibu hospital in Surakarta from 1982 until 2004. After his retirement he continued to practice from home.

In 2016 he suffered a stroke and was treated free of charge by Kasih Ibu. He was treated again in 2021, 2022, and April 2023 by the same hospital following falls.

On 22 December 2023, he was admitted to Kasih Ibu. He died there on 9 January 2024, at the age of 89. Thousands of people paid their respects at the funeral home before his cremation.
