= Mangkunegara VIII =

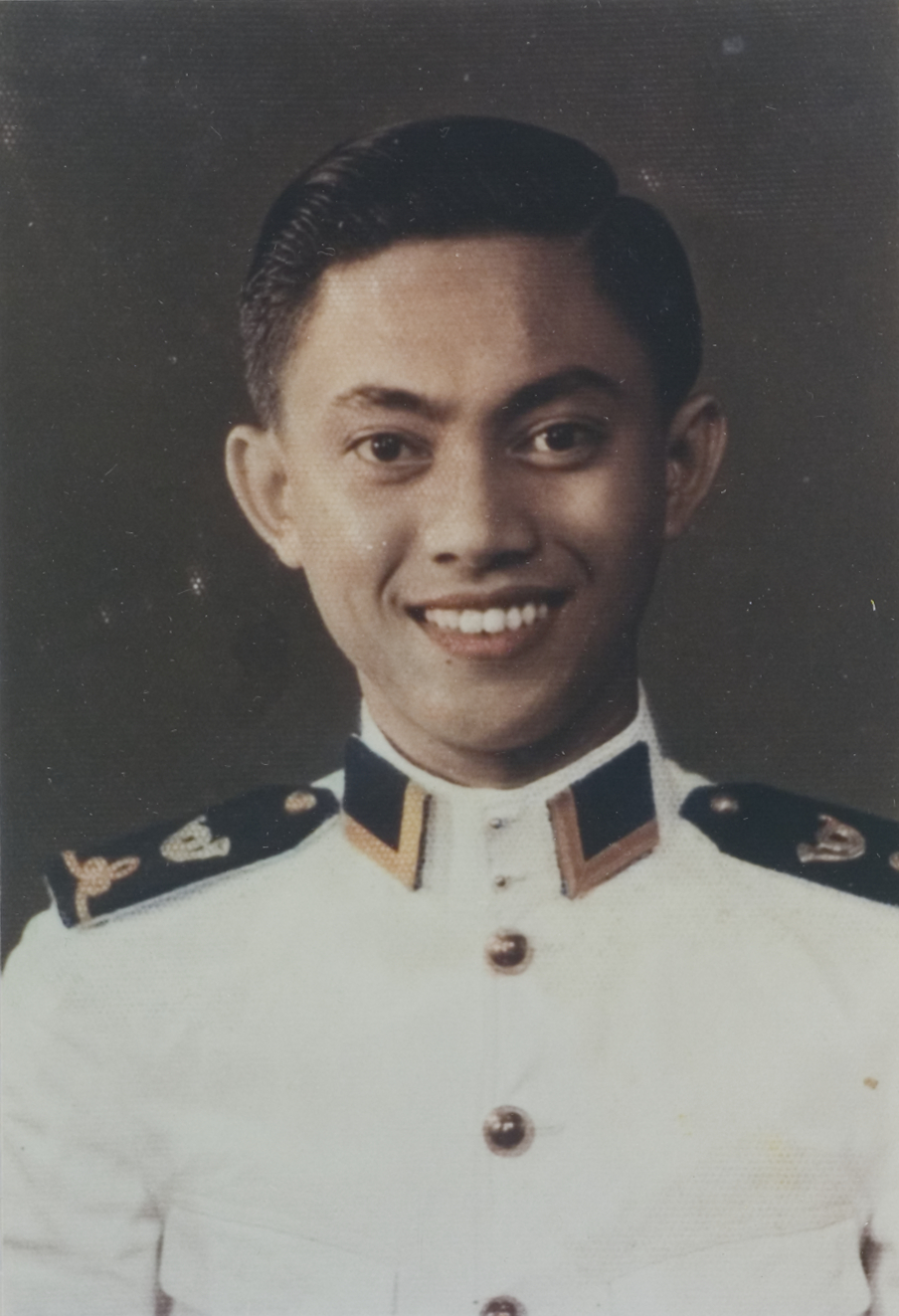
- RM Saroso Notosoeparto c. 1940

8th Duke of Mangkunegaran
- Reign: 1944–1987
- Predecessor: Mangkunegara VII
- Successor: Mangkunegara IX
- Born: Bendara Raden Mas Saroso Notosoeparto; 7 April 1925; Kartasura
- Died: 2 August 1987 (aged 62); Surakarta
- Spouse: G.K.P. Mangkunegara VIII / R.Aj. Sunituti (m. 1941; died 1978)
- Issue: KPA/GPH.Radityo Prabu Kusumo; KGPAA Mangkunegara IX; G.R.Ay. Retno Satuti Rahadiyan Yamin; G.R.Ay. Retno Rosati Hudiono Kadarisman; G.P.H. Saktyo Kusumo; G.P.H. Suryo Hamiseno; G.R.Ay. Retno Astrini; G.P.H. Herwasto Kusumo
- House: Mataram
- Father: Mangkunegara VII
- Mother: B.R.Ay. Retnaningrum

Vice Governor of Special Region of Surakarta
- In office 1945–1946
- President: Sukarno
- Preceded by: Office established
- Succeeded by: Office abolished

Military service
- Branch/service: Indonesian Army
- Years of service: 1945-(?)
- Rank: Major General TNI (Tit.)
- Battles/wars: First Dutch Military Aggression; Second Dutch Military Aggression; Siege of Surakarta

Prince Mangkunegara VIII, 8th Duke of Mangkunegaran (Kartasura, 7 April 1925 – Surakarta, 2 August 1987) was an Indonesian politician, and the eighth and last sovereign Duke of Mangkunegaran, who reigned from 1944 until his death in 1987. He experienced the Dutch colonial period and the beginning of Indonesia's independence. Mangkunegara VIII was the son of Mangkunegara VII, by Gusti Raden Ayu Retnaningrum, one of his secondary wives. The queen consort Gusti Kanjeng Ratu Timur had only one child, a daughter named Gusti Raden Ayu Siti Nurul Kusumawardhani.

Mangkunagara VIII faced extreme difficulty in maintaining the sovereignty of his state. As a result, the state of Surakarta (including Mangkunagaran) were incorporated into the province of Central Java in 1950. Mangkunagara VIII died in 1987 and was succeeded by his third child and second son as Mangkunegara IX.

== Early life ==
B.R.M. Natasoeparto was born on Friday Pahing, 1 January 1920, the first son of Mangkunegara VII and his secondary wife (Garwo Ampil), BRAy Retnaningrum. As the son of a secondary wife rather than the queen consort (Garwo Padmi), he was one of seven children born to Mangkunegara VII from both his consort and concubines.

During his childhood, B.R.M. Sarosa (Natasoeparto) received both formal and non-formal education. His non-formal education was provided through private tutoring by Dutch educators. This was a deliberate policy by Mangkunegara VII to ensure his children achieved proficiency in the Dutch language, enabling them to communicate and interact effectively with the Dutch colonial administration and community.

Within the Mangkunegaran Palace environment, his upbringing was deeply rooted in the ancestral traditions and oral histories of the dynasty. His lessons reflected Javanese philosophy, which heavily influenced his worldview. He was also taught the Dharma principles established by Raden Mas Said (the founder of the Mangkunegaran dynasty), which served as a moral compass for both citizens and leaders. These three pillars of Dharma consist of:

1. Rumangsa mèlu handarbèni ("a sense of belonging")
2. Wajib mèlu hanggondhèli ("the obligation to defend and maintain")
3. Mulat sarira hangrasa wani ("the courage for self-introspection")

Mangkunegara VII also instilled specific life principles in Sarosa to build his character as a member of the royal house. These principles included:

1. Galek Penggautan: Striving for self-cultivation and productivity.
2. Rigen: Persistence in pursuing one's goals.
3. Gemi: Frugality and resourcefulness.
4. Nastiti: Precision in observation and examination.
5. Weruh ing petung: Competence in calculations and planning.
6. Taberi tatanya: Diligence in seeking knowledge through inquiry.
7. Nyegah kayun: Curbing meaningless desires or extravagance.
8. Namen ing sedya: Earnestness in pursuing ambitions.

His formal education began at age seven at the Europeesche Lagere School (ELS) in Pasar Legi, Solo. During the colonial era, ELS was a primary school that used Dutch as the medium of instruction. Although primarily intended for Europeans, it was also open to wealthy "Foreign Orientals" (such as the Chinese merchant class) and the indigenous nobility (Priyayi). While his royal status granted him the right to attend, admission also required a high degree of Dutch proficiency and intellectual merit.

Sarosa graduated from ELS in 1932 and subsequently enrolled in the Meer Uitgebreid Lager Onderwijs (MULO). He completed his three-year secondary education at MULO in 1936. Following his graduation, Sarosa expressed a desire to attend the Algemeene Middelbare School (AMS) in Jakarta to experience life and gain independence outside the palace walls. Mangkunegara VII granted this request, considering the 16-year-old Sarosa mature enough to live away from the Mangkunegaran Palace, albeit still under the monarch's supervision.

== Reign ==
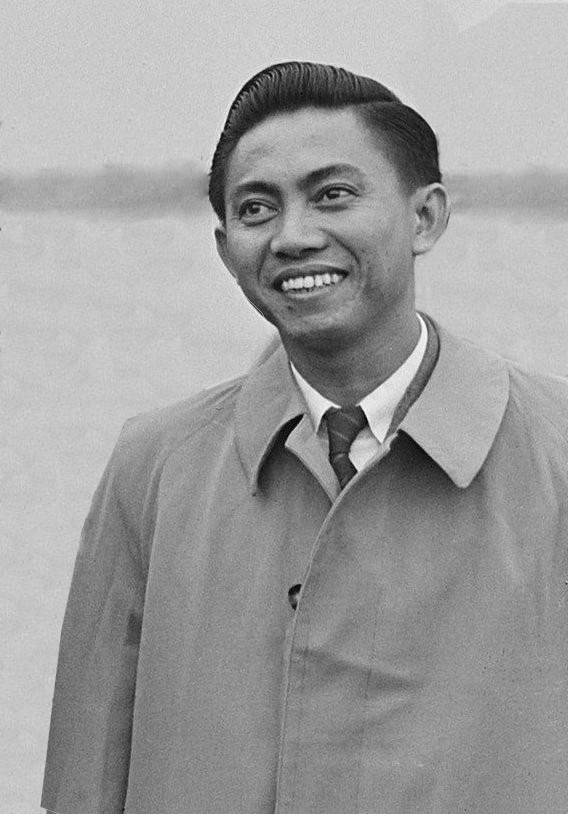
Mangkunegara VIII at Schiphol Airport in 1949.

Mangkunegara VIII made significant contributions to Javanese performing arts, most notably by reviving the Bedhaya Anglir Mendung dance. This sacred dance, originally composed by Mangkunegara I, had long been lost to tradition until Mangkunegara VIII reconstructed and reintroduced it in 1970. In addition to this revival, he also choreographed a popular folk-style dance known as the Gambyong Retno Kusumo.

In the political sphere, he served as a member of the People's Representative Council (DPR RI), following the 1971 and 1977 general elections. Beyond his political and cultural roles, he was also known as an active supporter and member of the Islamic organization Muhammadiyah.

Mangkunegara VIII died in 1987. He was succeeded by his second son, GPH. Sujiwakusuma, who ascended the throne as Mangkunegara IX.

== Personal life ==
In 1941, he married his relative, Raden Ajeng Sunituti, a daughter of his elder uncle, Kanjeng Pangeran Harya Suryokusumo. Upon his acension, she was the principal consort, styled as Gusti Kanjeng Putri Mangkunegara. Their first child born in 1942, upon reaching adulthood, he was styled as Kanjeng Pangeran Harya Radityo Prabukusumo, became the heir apparent. In 1958, Mangkunegara VIII had interest on a dancer from Wonogiri, took her as secondary wife, named Bendara Raden Ayu Setyowati.

The following table includes only partners/spouses and children who are publicly known or have been reported by media sources. Names and titles may vary across sources, since honorific prefixes and titles may change over time.

Name	Spouse	Children
Gusti Pangeran Harya Radityo Prabukusumo	Erna Santoso	Bendara Raden Ayu Amina Radyastuti
Gusti Raden Ayu Retno Satuti	Rahadian Yamin	Kanjeng Pangeran Harya Roy Rahajasa Yamin; Bendara Raden Mas Arya Riano Jayanegara Yamin
Gusti Raden Ayu Retno Rosati	Hudiono Kadarisman	
Kanjeng Gusti Pangeran Adipati Arya Mangkunegara IX	Sukmawati Soekarnoputri; Gusti Kanjeng Putri Mangkunegara IX	Gusti Pangeran Harya Paundrakarna Jiwo Suryonegoro; Gusti Raden Ayu Putri Agung Suniwati; Gusti Raden Ajeng Ancillasura Marina Sudjiwo; Kanjeng Gusti Pangeran Adipati Arya Mangkunegara X
Gusti Raden Ajeng Retno Sakunti		
Gusti Pangeran Harya Saktyo Kusumo		
Gusti Pangeran Harya Suryo Hamiseno		
Gusti Pangeran Harya Herwasto Kusumo		
YM Gusti Raden Ayu Retno Astrini	YM Tunku Abu Bakar ibn Tunku Aris Bendahara Abdul Rahman of Johor (Kanjeng Pangeran Harya YM Tunku Abu Bakar Dutahadiningrat)	Bendara Raden Ayu YM Tunku Kurshiah Aminah bint Tunku Abu Bakar; Bendara Raden Mas YM Tunku Abdul Rahman Burhanuddin ibn Tunku Abu Bakar; Bendara Raden Ayu YM Tunku Aishah Johara bint Tunku Abu Bakar

Regnal titles
Preceded by Mangkunegara VII	Ruler of Mangkunegaran; 1944–1987	Succeeded by Mangkunegara IX
