= Lengger lanang =

Indonesian traditional dance

Lengger lanang dance
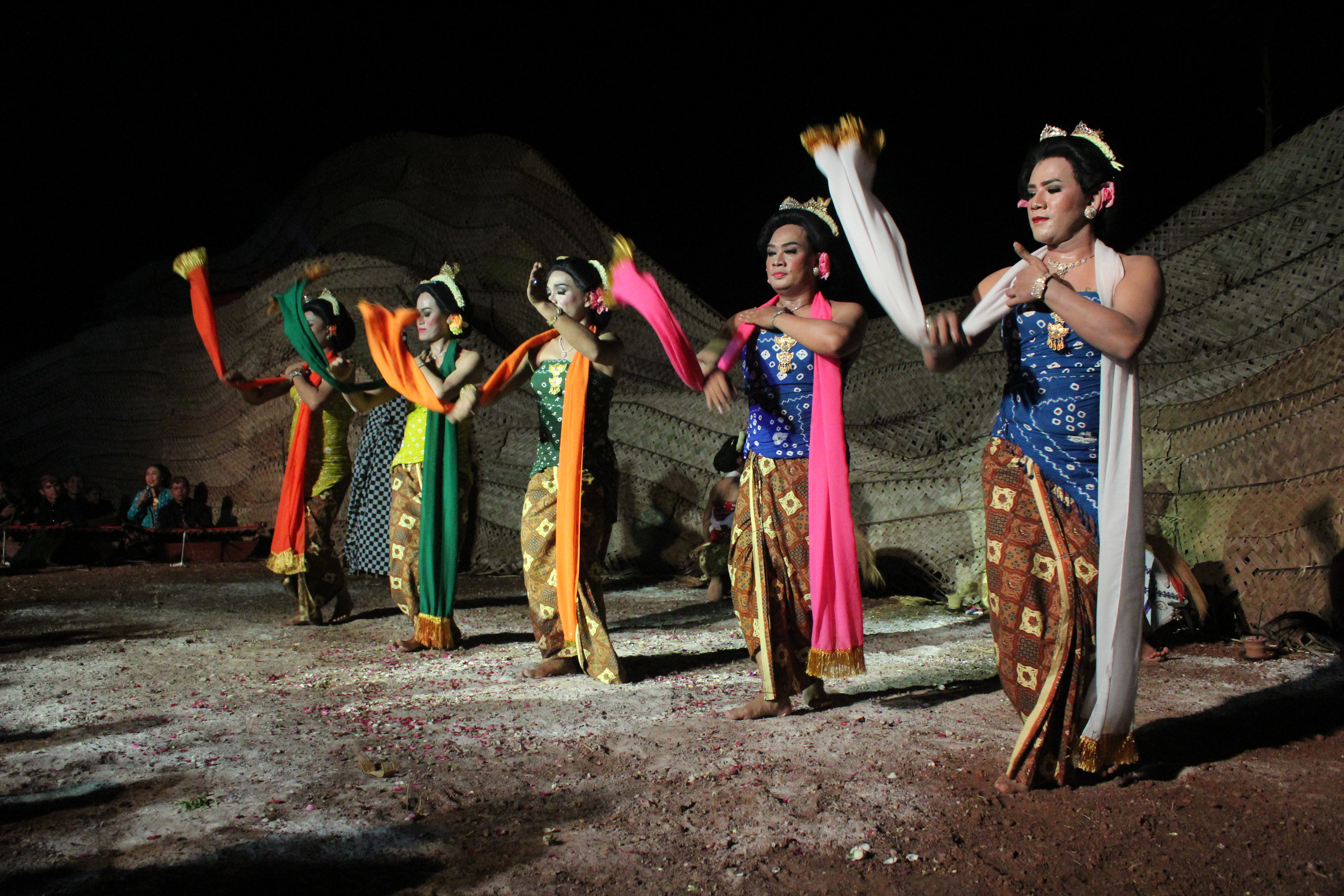
- Lengger lanang performance in Java
- Native name: ꧋ꦭꦺꦁꦒꦺꦂꦭꦤꦁ (Javanese); Tari Lengger lanang (Indonesian)
- Genre: Folk dance
- Instrument(s): Gamelan, Gong, Calung
- Inventor: Javanese
- Origin: Central Java (Indonesia)

Lenger lanang (Javanese: ꧋ꦭꦺꦁꦒꦺꦂꦭꦤꦁ) is a traditional Javanese dance originating from Banyumas, Central Java, Indonesia. This dance has existed for hundreds of years. Lengger lanang is not just an ordinary dance but a tradition of worshiping the Goddess of Fertility (Dewi Sri) to celebrate harvests or village clean ceremonies that have been passed down from generation to generation. Lengger lanang dance is a form of cross-gender culture in Indonesia. This dance is categorized as cross-gender because the performer is a man who appears to be a woman.

Lengger dance is a folk art that has existed and developed for a long time in the agrarian society of Banyumas. Previously, Lengger lanang was considered to have magical-religious elements which were originally staged as a form of community gratitude in a ceremony after the harvest. Even so, the Lengger lanang dance is currently often stigmatized by society and is considered to spread LGBT (Lesbian, Gay, Bisexual, and Transgender) values in Indonesia.

== History ==
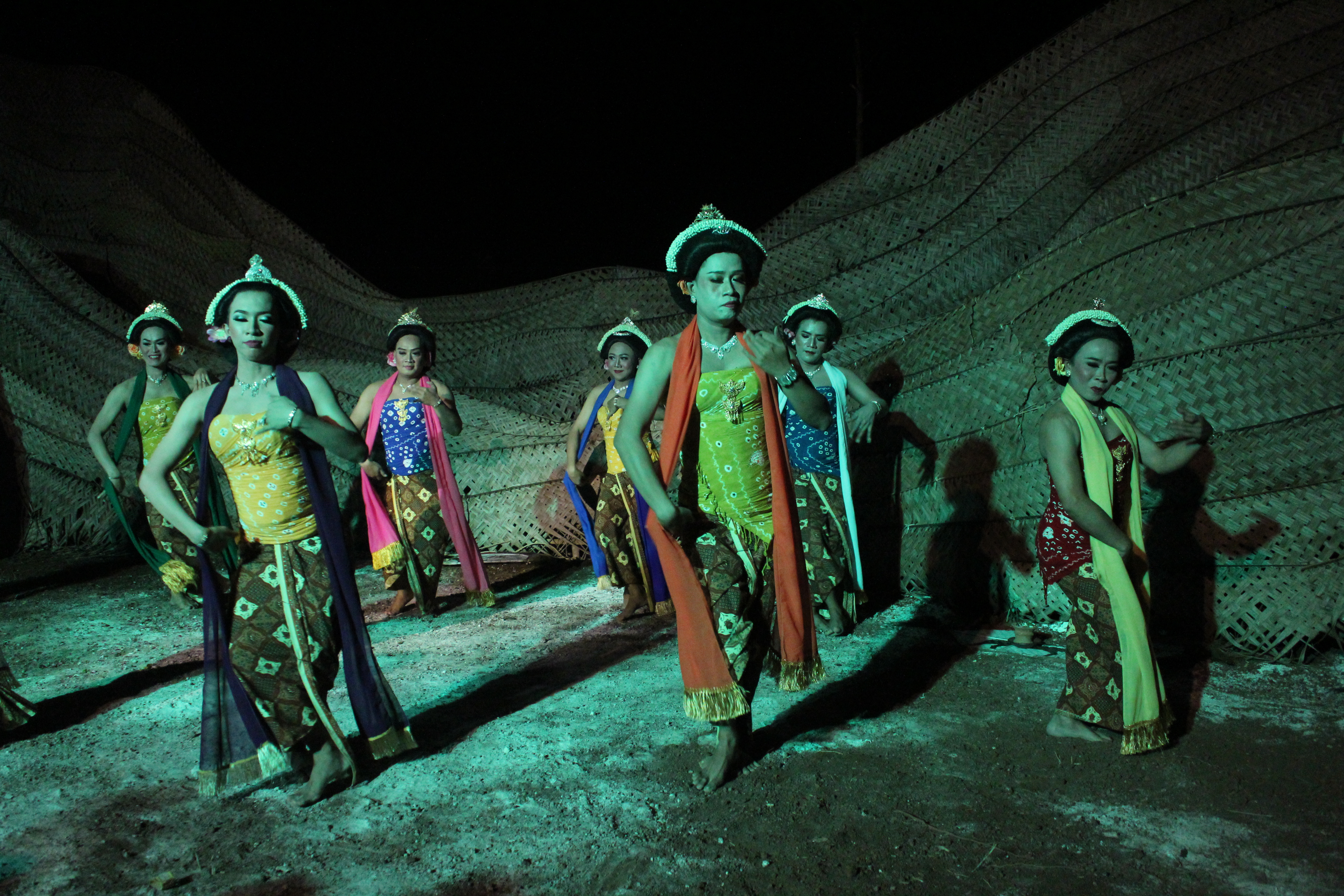
Seven lengger lanang dancers, dancing with selendang or scarves

The origin of this dance is not known for certain, but there are many traces of dances in fertility rituals such as the lengger. In the book Tradisi Lengger dan Transformasi (2000) by Sunaryadi, there are two possibilities for the emergence of Lengger art. Some say that Lengger comes from Jatilawang, Banyumas.

There is also a mention that the traditional art originated from Mataram and entered the Kalibagor area, Banyumas in 1755. Actually, the Lengger dance is performed by men but is dressed like a woman. So as if the dance was performed by women.

The Lengger Lanang dance is thought to have appeared in Banyumas in the 18th century. At that time Mangkunegara VII ordered three writers to travel to Java. Then write about the life of the Javanese people at that time. While in Banyumas, the writer encountered the art of Lengger. The art is written on the Serat Centhini. Lengger lanang is believed to have been adapted from the Ronggeng dance, but the difference is that Ronggeng is performed by female dancers.

== Meaning ==
Lengger lanang dance is an art that has the meaning of fertility and religion.

Banyumas people believe that this art contains fertility values. The community considers Lengger lanang as Ana Celeng Gawe Geger, which means that in ancient times when the harvest season arrived, wild boars from the forest came down to agricultural land to damage those being harvested, so that makes the community fail to harvest. Then the community had an idea to drive the animals away with various kinds of beats and sounds. Where it is sounded simultaneously by men, for women to perform spontaneous movements by waving their hands to the right and left to ward off animals by following the music. This activity continues to be carried out until it becomes a tradition with the birth of the art of Lengger Banyumasan in the community.

In the past, before performing a performance, dancers would perform rituals first, such as fasting Monday and Thursday, or meditating in a certain place. It was done to invite the indang (spirit that possessed the Lengger dancer). One who has attained the indang can dance and sing very well without practice.

== Form and movement ==
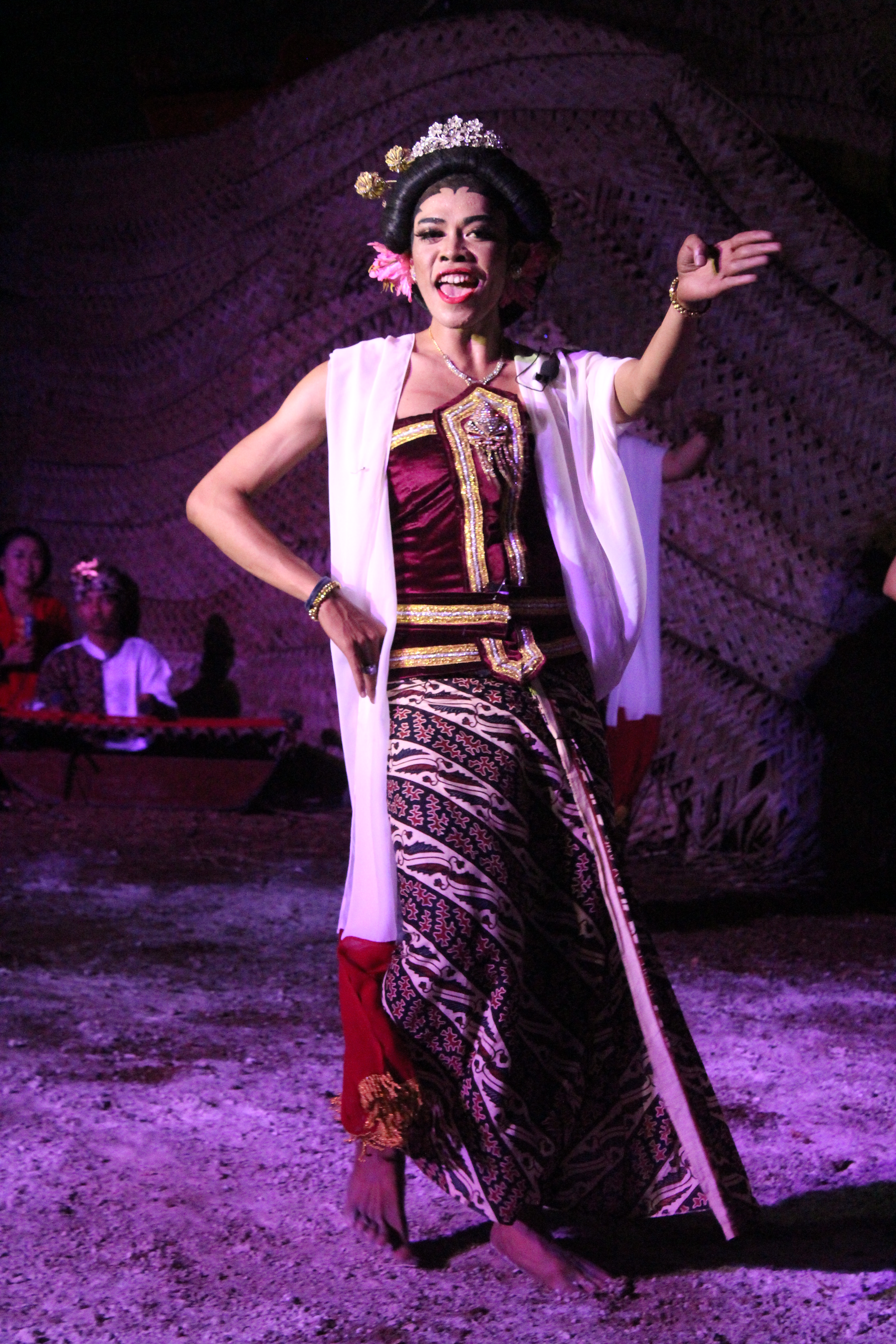
Lengger lanang dancer with traditional costume

The Lengger lanang dance performance is divided into four acts or scenes. The first round is the Gamyongan, the second round is the Lenggeran, the third round is the Badhutan or Bodhoran, and the last is the Baladewaan.

The movement of the Lengger lanang dance is very simple and there is no standard for the details of the movement. Basically, the people in the past did not have special skills, such as what Lengger called Ana Celeng Gawe Geger.

The clothes worn are mekak, jarik cloth, and sampur. At the head using a Javanese bun with simple jewelry, namely a comb made of buffalo horn that looks like a sirkam. The jewelry used to be called cundhuk, then there were menthul and giwang. To the accompaniment of gamelan music or more specifically a set of calung musical instruments.

== See also ==
- Lengger
- Dance in Indonesia
