= Lengger =

Indonesian traditional dance

Lengger dance
- Legger dance performance in Wonosobo
- Native name: ꧋ꦭꦺꦁꦒꦺꦂ (Javanese); Tari Lengger (Indonesian)
- Genre: Traditional dance
- Instrument(s): Gambang, Saron, Gong, Kendhang
- Inventor: Javanese
- Origin: Central Java (Indonesia)

Lengger (Javanese: ꧋ꦭꦺꦁꦒꦺꦂ) is a traditional Javanese dance originating from Banyumas, Central Java, Indonesia. This dance is played in pairs, between a man and a woman. Lengger dance is one of the sacred dances in Java.

== Etymology ==
Lengger means 'male and female dancers' which comes from the (Javanese: eling ngger). The meaning of Lengger is to give advice and messages to everyone to be able to invite and defend the truth and get rid of ugliness.

== History ==
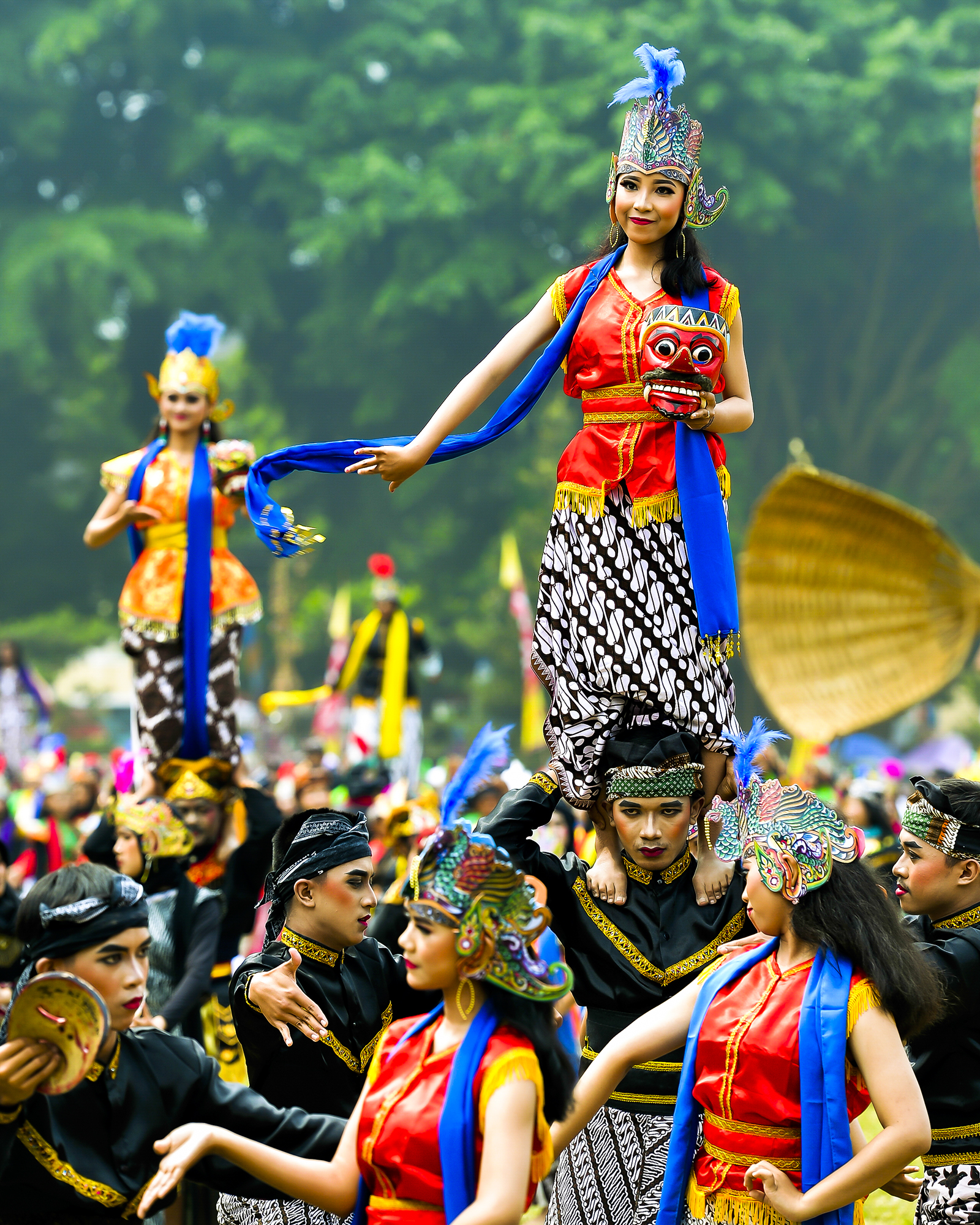
Lengger dance can be played by men and women, either in pairs or in large groups

The Lengger dance began with a competition from the King Brawijaya of Majapahit who lost his daughter, Dewi Sekartaji. The king rewarded whoever managed to find his daughter, if the person who finds it is a man, he will be married to his daughter but if it is a woman, he will be appointed to the royal family. This competition was participated by many knights and finally only 2 participants left, namely Raden Panji Asmara Bangun disguised as Joko Kembang Kuning from the Janggala kingdom and Prabu Klana from the opposite kingdom. It was Prabu Klana that made the King's daughter run away because she was about to be paired with Prabu Klana, to win the competition, Joko Kembang Kuning goes on a quest disguised as a topeng (masked) woman who dances from one area to another to lure the princess out of her hiding place.

Joko Kembang Kuning's appearance attracted many crowds who saw his performance until finally the name of this dance was called Lengger which comes from 2 Javanese syllables, 'Ledek' which means male dancer and 'Geger' which means crowd. In the end, Dewi Sekar Taji emerged from hiding and finally Joko Kembang Kuning won the competition and married the princess. In their wedding, the bride and groom were treated to a performance of the Lengger dance.

During the Islamic period, the popularity of the Lengger dance increased because it was used by Sunan Kalijaga, one of the walisongo, to preach, until finally the meaning of Lengger was changed to 'Elingo Ngger', a Javanese phrase which means 'Remember'. Through this dance, Sunan Kalijaga reminded the people at that time to always remember the Almighty. In its development, this Lengger Dance is performed at every celebration event in Central Java. There are 2 dancers, namely men wearing masks and women wearing typical Javanese dancers clothes.

== Form and Movement ==
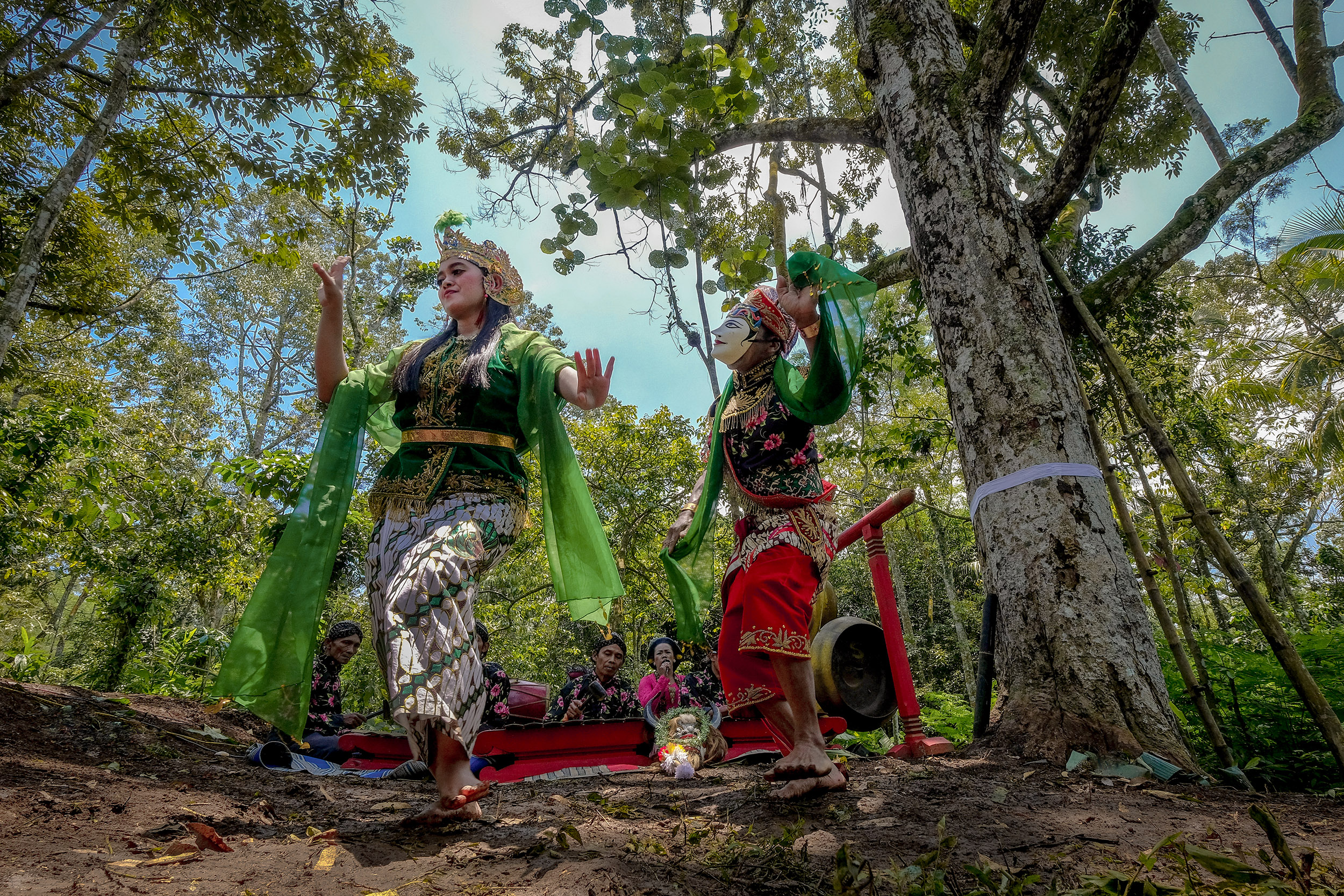
Lengger dancer with gamelan instrument

This dance is performed by 2 dancers, a man and a woman in pairs. Typical of male dancers wearing topeng and typical of female dancers wearing traditional clothes and dressed like ancient Javanese princesses using a kemben and selendang (shawl). The duration of this dance is between 10 minutes in each round and is accompanied by music from traditional musical instruments such as gambang, saron, kendang, gongs, and others.

== See also ==
- Bedhaya
- Gambyong
- Lengger lanang
- Dance in Indonesia
