= Yogi Supardi =

Indonesian military officer and diplomat (1929–2019)

Ignatius Yogi Supardi
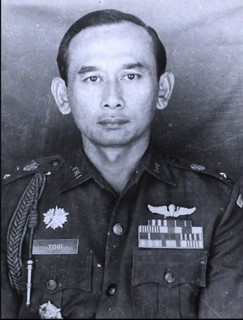

Indonesia Ambassador to Japan
- In office 31 August 1987 – 16 May 1991
- President: Suharto
- Preceded by: Wiyogo Atmodarminto
- Succeeded by: Poedji Koentarso

Secretary General of the Department of Defense and Security
- In office 8 November 1983 – 10 October 1987
- President: Suharto
- Preceded by: Himself (as the Chief of Staff of the Department of Defense)
- Succeeded by: Ida Bagus Sudjana

Personal details
- Born: July 25, 1929 Klaten, Central Java, Dutch East Indies
- Died: September 15, 2019 (aged 90) Gatot Soebroto Army Hospital, Jakarta, Indonesia
- Party: Golkar
- Spouse: Olga Wahyu (m. 1955; died 2007)

Military service
- Allegiance: Indonesia
- Branch/service: Army
- Years of service: 1948—1981
- Rank: Lieutenant General

Ignatius Yogi Supardi (25 July 1929 — 15 September 2019) was an Indonesian military officer and diplomat who became the Secretary General of the Ministry of Defense and Indonesian Ambassador to Japan.

== Early life and education ==
Yogi was born on 25 July 1929 in Klaten. He started his education at the Hollandsch-Inlandsche School (Dutch schools for natives), where he graduated in 1942, and graduated from junior high school in 1945.

Following the proclamation of Indonesian independence, Yogi enrolled at the Yogya Military Academy in Jogjakarta. At that time, the academy was just recently established on 31 October 1945. Yogi, along with 441 other cadets, was accepted into the academy. During his military education in the academy, Yogi seized guns from the Japanese forces in 1945 and was put in charge at the Northern Bandung Front in 1946.

Yogi graduated with the rank of second lieutenant on 28 November 1948 in a ceremony at the Istana Negara. From the 442 cadets who were accepted into the academy, only 196 cadets—including Yogi— graduated from the academy.

== Military career ==
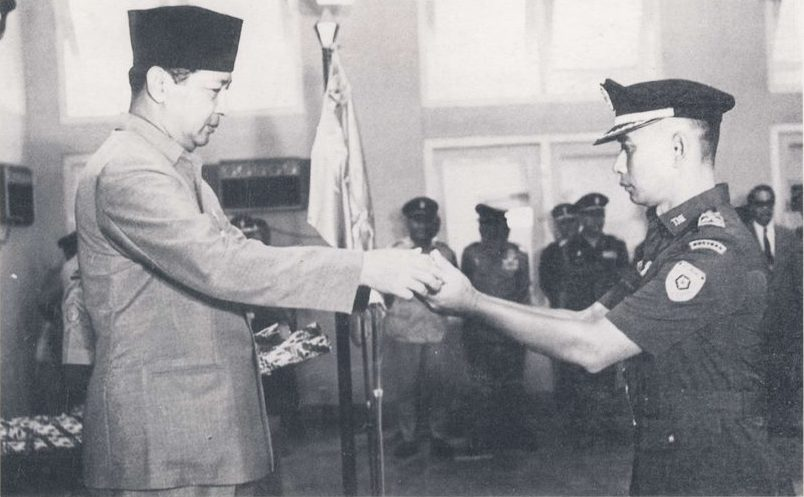
Suharto handing over a plaque to Yogi Supardi during his studies at the National Resilience Institute.

After his graduation from the academy, Yogi became part of the Prince Diponegoro Division in Magelang and was stationed to quell the Madiun Affair. After the conflict ended, he was moved to Yogyakarta, where he fought against the Dutch forces. He was moved again to South Sumatra in 1949 and became a liaison officer between the Indonesian and the Dutch army. He stayed in South Sumatra for a year later as a chief officer until he was instructed to attend the School of Artillery in India. He graduated from the school in 1952 and was promoted to first lieutenant.

Following his promotion, Yogi taught in the Central Artillery Education as an instructor for four years. He was assigned overseas shortly after and became assistant to the military attaché in London Lieutenant Colonel Sutojo on 4 August 1956. He was rotated several years later to held the same post in Manila.

He returned to Indonesia in 1960 and became the Commander of the Central Artillery Education. He left the post in 1963 and became the Commander of the 1st Army Strategic Command Artillery Brigade. He was promoted further through the Army Strategic Command structure and became the 3rd assistant for the Commander of the Army Strategic Command Umar Wirahadikusumah. He then studied at the National Resilience institute from 1968 until 1969.

Yogi was moved to the Army Chief of Staff structure and served as the Deputy Fifth Assistant (Research and Development) to the Army Chief of Staff until 1972. He briefly became the acting Fifth Assistant for several months in 1971, replacing the outgoing Major General Mardanus.

At the end of his career as the Deputy Fifth Assistant, Yogi was chosen by the Generation of 1945—a nickname for military officers who fought in the Indonesian National Revolution—to formulate the plan for an orderly transition between the generation of 1945 officers and post-war military officers. Yogi's plan did not consider the generational gap between the generation of 1945 and post-war generation (later nicknamed as the bridging generation) as a separate generation and included the bridging generation into the post-war generation. His basic plan was to maintain retired generation of 1945 officers (scheduled to retire in the 1980s) at the Department of Defence and Security, where he believed that "the ideological goals of the independence struggle could continue to be directed by the men who won that independence".

Yogi was posted to the 9th Military Regional Command/Udayana in Bali, where he became its commander on 25 March 1972. He was replaced by Ignatius Pranoto on 16 February 1974. From Bali, Yogi was rotated to the Indonesian Army Command and General Staff College in Bandung and became the commander of the college from 20 March 1974. He left the post on 3 March 1976.

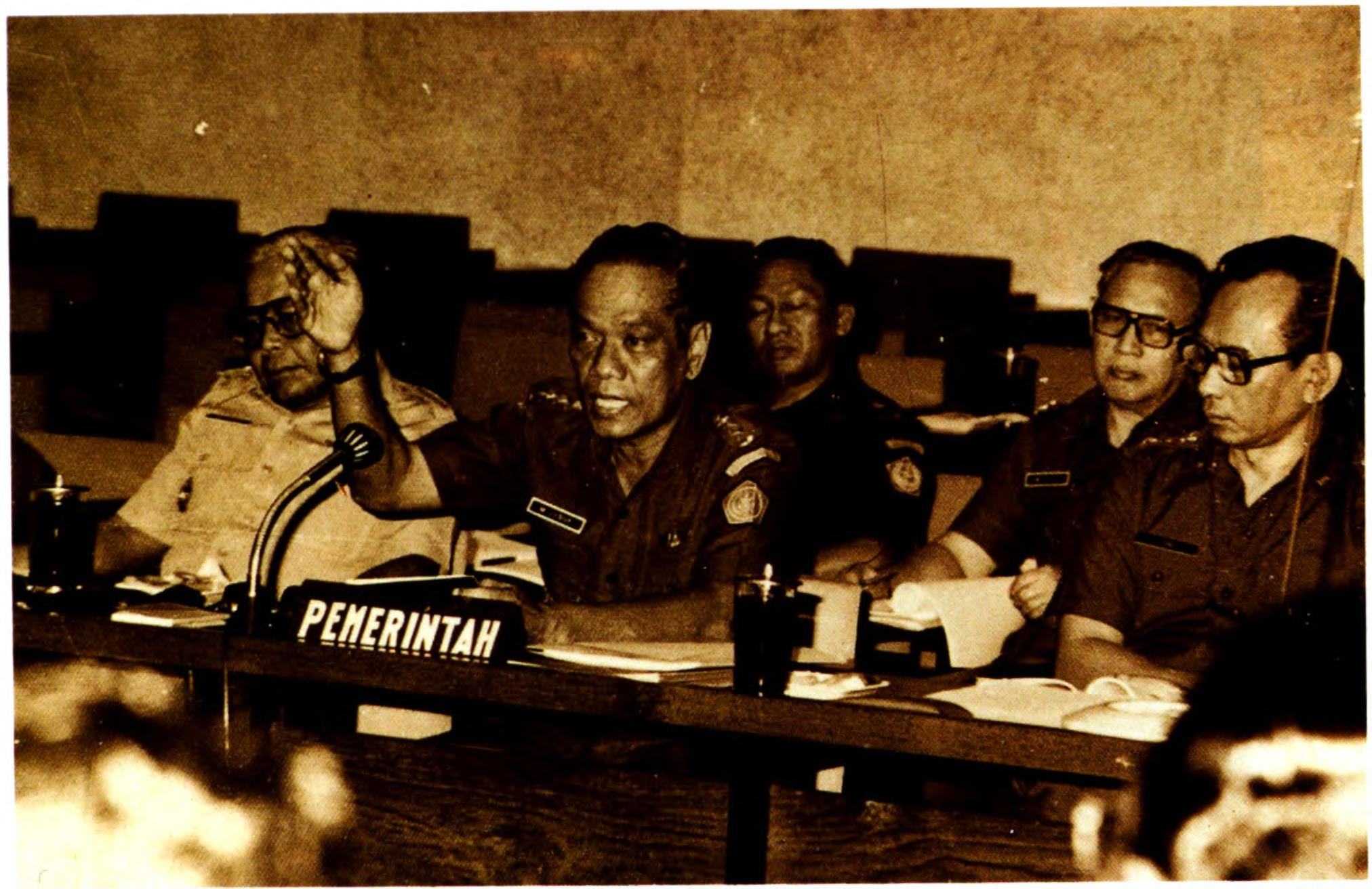
Yogi (far right) at a meeting with the People's Representative Council, 1979.

On 21 January 1976, Yogi was made as the Assistant for Politics, Strategy and General Planning to the Commander-in-Chief of the Armed Forces. Yogi's new office was autonomous and ranked higher compared to all other assistants. In accordance to his regeneration plan, Yogi held a post called the Chief of the Administrative Staff inside the Department of Defense and Security in 1980. Yogi's new post coordinates the work of the Assistants for Personnel and Manpower Development; Logistics, Material Development, and Installations; Finance; and International Cooperation.

The office of the Chief of the Administrative Staff was reorganized into the Secretary General. Yogi still maintained his seat in the Department of Defense and became Secretary General on 8 November 1983. However, the power of the Secretary General was greatly reduced from its chief of staff predecessor. The control over personnel, logistics, or finance was transferred from Yogi Supardi to Benny Moerdani, the Commander-in-Chief of the Armed Forces at that time. Yogi resigned from his office on 10 October 1987 and was replaced by Ida Bagus Sudjana.

== Later life ==
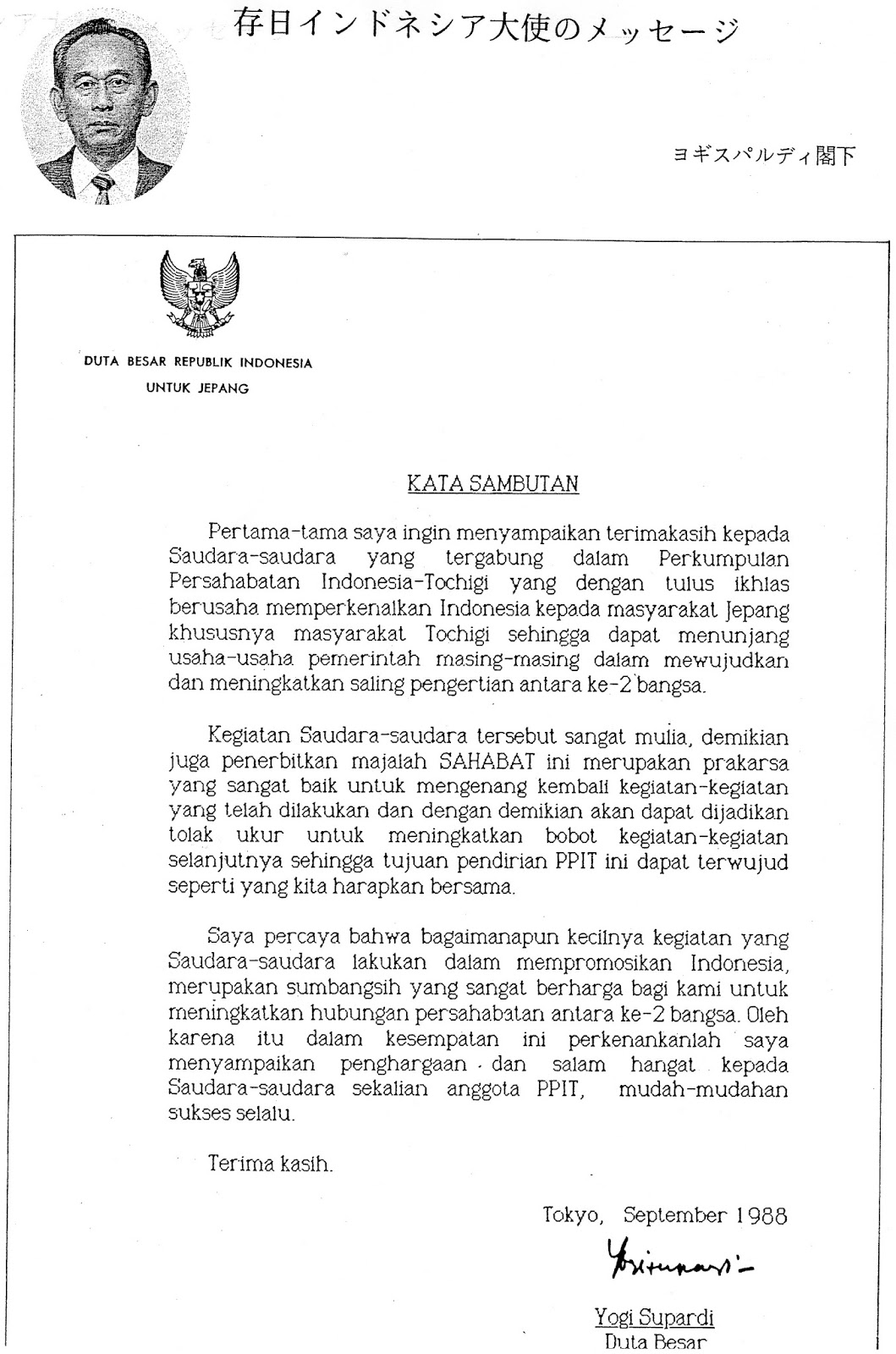
A letter written by Yogi during his tenure as ambassador.

After his retirement from the military, Yogi became the Indonesia ambassador to Japan on 31 August 1987. He served as ambassador for four years until he was replaced by 16 May 1991 by Poedji Koentarso.

Yogi attended the reunion of the 1948 graduates of the Yogya Military Academy in 1993. The reunion was attended by several other notable figures, such as Acub Zainal (former governor of Irian Jaya), Gatot Suherman (former governor of West Nusa Tenggara), and Muhammad Ismail (former governor of Central Java).

Yogi became active at the Union of Retired Army Soldiers (Persatuan Purnawirawan Angkatan Darat). Prior to his death, Yogi became a member of its advisory board. Yogi also voiced his support for Megawati Sukarnoputri and Prabowo Subianto at the 2009 Indonesian presidential election.

Yogi died at 05.18 on 15 September 2019 in Gatot Soebroto Army Hospital. A requirem mass was held for him three days later. He was buried at the Semaki Heroes Cemetery on 18 September in Yogyakarta with a ceremony led by the Commander of the Diponegoro Military Region Mochamad Effendi.

== Personal life ==
Yogi was married to Olga Wahyu on 25 December 1955. Olga became one of the victims of Garuda Indonesia Flight 200 that crashed into a rice field and burst into flames while landing at Adisutjipto International Airport on 7 March 2007. The couple has two sons, the eldest is Ricardo Haryogi, their second child named Angelo Karmayogi, and their youngest daughter, Prisca Marina Haryogi.

Their youngest and only daughter, Prisca Marina Haryogi Supardi, was married to Mangkunegara IX, Duke of Mangkunegaran. Marina was given the title of Gusti Kanjeng Putri Mangkunegara IX, while Yogi himself was given the title Kanjeng Pangeran Haryo Haryogi Mangun Winoto.

== Dates of rank ==
Officer cadet	24 November 1945
Second lieutenant	28 November 1948
First lieutenant	1 July 1952
Captain	1 January 1955
Major	1 January 1959
Lieutenant colonel	1 June 1962
Colonel	1 September 1966
Brigadier general	1 November 1969
Major general	1 October 1974
Lieutenant general	1 April 1980

== Bibliography ==
- Moehkardi (7 August 2019), Akademi Militer Yogya dalam Perjuangan Fisik 1945 sampai dengan 1949, Gadjah Mada University, ISBN 978-602-386-416-4
- Haseman, John B. (15 November 1984), The Dynamics Of Change: Regeneration Of The Indonesian Army (PDF), Corresponding Course: US Army War College, archived (PDF) from the original on 1 June 2022
