= Mangkunegara IX =

Prince of Mangkunegaran (1951–2021)

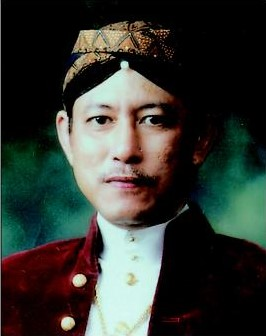
- Mangkunegara IX as a candidate for the Regional Representative Council

9th Duke of Mangkunegaran
- In office 3 September 1987 – 13 August 2021
- Preceded by: Mangkunegara VIII
- Succeeded by: Mangkunegara X

Personal details
- Born: Gusti Pangeran Harjo Sujiwakusuma; 18 August 1951 Surakarta, Central Java, Indonesia
- Died: 13 August 2021 (aged 69) Jakarta, Indonesia
- Resting place: Astana Girilayu
- Spouses: Sukmawati Sukarnoputri (m. 1974; div. 1984) Prisca Marina Haryogi Supardi (m. 1990–2021)
- Relations: Sukarno (father-in-law); Yogi Supardi (father-in-law)
- Children: From Sukmawati Soekarno: Paundrakarna; Putri Agung Suniwati; From GKP Mangkunegara IX: Bhre Cakrahutomo Wira Sudjiwo (Mangkunegara X); Ancillasura Sudjiwo
- Parent: K.G.P.A.A. Mangkunagara VIII

Mangkunegara IX, 9th Duke of Mangkunegaran (18 August 1951 – 13 August 2021) was the traditional ruler of the former state of Mangkunegaran, located in Java, Indonesia. He succeeded his father, Mangkunegara VIII, as the 9th Ruler of Mangkunegaran on 3 September 1987. His full royal name was Kanjeng Gusti Pangeran Adipati Arya Mangkunegara IX.

Prior to his accession he was named Gusti Pangeran Hadiningrat Sujiwa Kusuma. In the meantime G.P.H. Sudjiwo Kusumo became viceroy in Mangkunegaran.

His accession was controversial because for the first time in Indonesian history, Mangkunegaran involved relatives outside the core to participate in the decision.

== Early life ==
He was born in Surakarta the son of Mangkunegara VIII with brothers crown prince G.P.H. Radityo Prabukusumo, B.R.Aj. Retno Satuti. Rahadiyan Yamin, B.R.Aj. Retno Rosati Hudiono Kadarisman, B.R.M. Susaktyo, B.R.M. Herwasto, B.R.M. Kumiyakto and B.R.Aj. Retno Astrini.

His maternal grandfather and father were their brother and sister's son Mangkunegara V. His maternal grandfather was Prince Suryakusuma descended from the father whose grandfather was Mangkunegara VII.

== Personal life and death ==
Prince Sudjiwo Kusumo was previously married to Sukmawati Sukarnoputri, the third daughter of Indonesia's founding president Sukarno and his wife Fatmawati. They divorced in 1984 after they had two children. After his ascension to throne, he married Prisca Marina, the only daughter of former ambassador and military officer Yogi Supardi, on 28 June 1990. Minister of Defence L. B. Moerdani, Coordinating Minister for People's Welfare Supardjo Rustam, and Chairman of the Indonesian Olympic Committee Surono Reksodimedjo became their wedding witnesses. He had two children with Marina.

He died at the age of 69 on 13 August 2021 in Jakarta, five days short of his 70th birthday.

Regnal titles
Preceded by Mangkunegara VIII	Ruler of Mangkunegaran; 1987–2021	Succeeded by Mangkunegara X
