= Sukmawati Sukarnoputri =

Indonesian politician

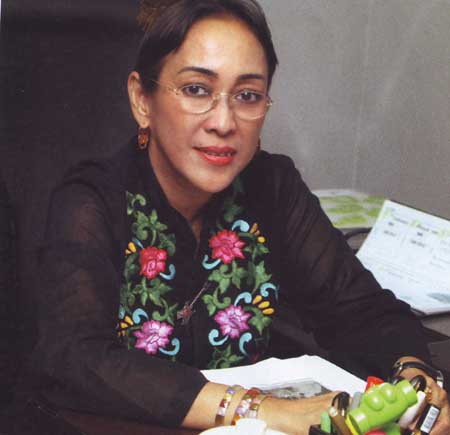
- Born: 26 October 1951 (age 74); Jakarta, Indonesia
- Education: International Relations
- Alma mater: Universitas Bung Karno
- Known for: daughter of Indonesia's founding father and first president
- Political party: PNIM
- Spouse(s): Mangkunegara IX (m. 1974; div. 1984) Muhammad Hilmy (m. 1989; died 2018)
- Children: Paundrakarna, GRA Putri Agung Suniwati, Muhammad Putra Perwira Utama
- Parent(s): Sukarno (father); Fatmawati (mother)

Diah Mutiara Sukmawati Sukarnoputri (born 26 October 1951) is the third daughter of Indonesia’s founding president Sukarno and his wife Fatmawati. Sukmawati is the younger sister of former Indonesian president Megawati Sukarnoputri and politician Rachmawati Sukarnoputri.

== Education ==
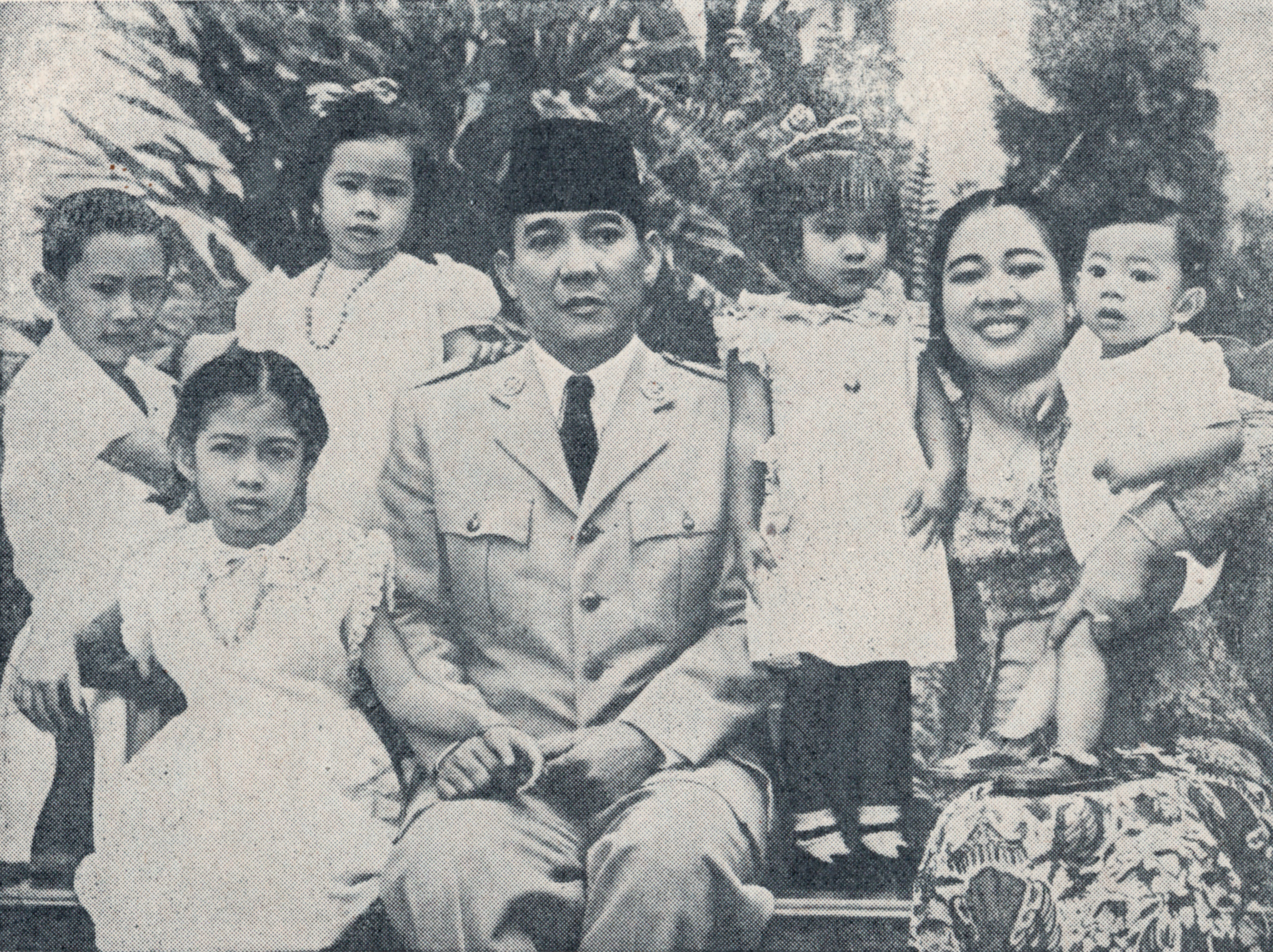
Sukarno and his family in 1952. Clockwise from the middle: Sukarno, Sukmawati, Fatmawati, Guruh, Megawati, Guntur, and Rachmawati

Sukmawati attended elementary and junior high school at Sekolah Rakyat (SR) Cikini in Jakarta, graduating in 1967. In 1969, she graduated from State Senior High School 3 Teladan. She attended the Dance Academy of the Jakarta Arts Education Institute (LPKJ) from 1970–1974. In 2003, she enrolled as a student of the Department of International Relations (HI) in the Faculty of Social and Political Sciences (Fisip) at Jakarta’s Bung Karno University.

== Political career ==
In 1998, following the fall of Suharto, she revived the Indonesian National Party (PNI), which was renamed PNI Supeni (or Soepeni) and competed in Indonesia’s 1999 general election, winning only 0.36% of the vote. Being ineligible to contest future elections because of its poor performance, the party changed its name to PNI Marhaenisme in 2002 and Sukmawati was appointed chairwoman. The party received 0.81% of votes in the 2004 general election, winning just one seat in parliament. In the 2009 election, the party won just 0.3% and lost its only seat.

=== Alleged fake diploma ===
On November 13, 2008, Sukmawati was named as a suspect in a fake diploma used as a requirement for the 2009 Indonesian legislative election candidacy of a Member of the House of Representatives candidate from PNI Marhaenisme for the electoral district of Bali. The Election Supervisory Board (Bawaslu) then reported Sukmawati to the National Police in July 2009, to open an investigation alleging she had falsified her high school diploma when registering as a legislative candidate for the Marhaenism Indonesian National Party. She used a photocopy of a diploma from SMA 3 Jakarta graduated in 1970, but it was not legalised. The school refused to legalise it because it stated that Sukmawati only attended school until second grade (grade 11) and did not attend school after marriage. She was only named as a suspect and not detained in this discontinued case. It was previously known that in the 2004 Indonesian legislative election, she used a certificate from SMA 22 Jakarta graduated in 1969 so she had two certificates with different graduation years. Police in August dropped the case, saying there was a lack of evidence as the school's records had been destroyed by a fire in 2007. Sukmawati withdrew her candidacy due to this case.

=== Memoir ===
In 2011, Sukmawati wrote a memoir about the 15 years she lived at the Merdeka Palace, called Creeping Coup d'Etat Mayjen Suharto (The Creeping Coup d’Etat of Major General Suharto). The book reveals the story of Sukmawati's life since she was born in Merdeka Palace and tells her historical testimony regarding the coup against Sukarno in 1965–1967.

She believes Suharto and other members of the military conducted a coup against Sukarno by using the Order of March 11, 1966. She said she cannot forgive Suharto for human rights violations that occurred in the aftermath of the coup.

== Personal life ==
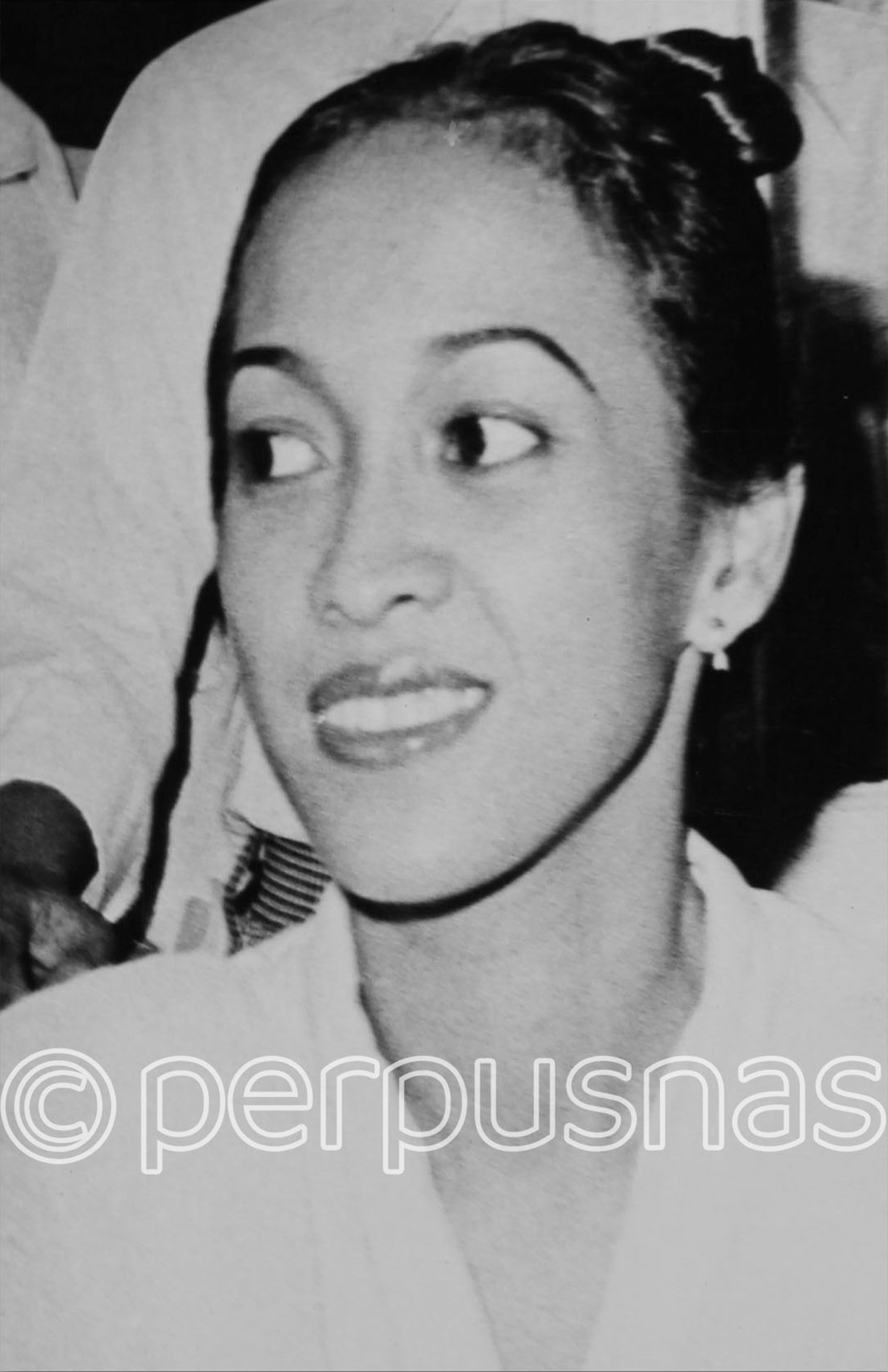
Sukmawati Sukarnoputri in 1977

Sukmawati was married to Prince Sujiwa Kusuma (now Adipati Mangkunegara IX) of the Mangkenegara royal family of Solo, Central Java. Later on, Prince Kusuma ascended the throne and took the title Kanjeng Gusti Pangeran Adipati Arya Mangkunegara IX. They had three children, and later divorced.

On 26 October 2021, she converted from Islam to Hinduism in a "Sudhi Wadani" Hindu ceremony in Bali. She defined the process as going back to her roots and described being influenced by her grandmother who was a Hindu.

== Controversies ==
=== Complaint against Rizieq Shihab ===
In October 2016, Sukmawati filed a police complaint against radical Muslim cleric Rizieq Shihab, accusing him of insulting Sukarno and Indonesian state ideology Pancasila. Rizieq had allegedly made a speech stating “in Sukarno's Pancasila, God is placed in the ass, whereas according to the Jakarta Charter, God is in the head”. The Jakarta Charter was a proposed preamble to Indonesia’s 1945 Constitution that would have required Muslims to follow Shariah law. Police declared Rizieq a suspect in January 2017. He fled Indonesia in May 2017 when also named a suspect in a pornography case.

=== Poem "Ibu Indonesia" ===
Ibu Indonesia

"Aku tak tahu Syariat Islam,
Yang kutahu sari konde ibu Indonesia sangatlah indah,
Lebih cantik dari cadar dirimu.

Gerai tekukan rambutnya suci,
Sesuci kain pembungkus ujudmu,
Rasa ciptanya sangatlah beraneka,
Menyatu dengan kodrat alam sekitar.

Jari jemarinya berbau getah hutan,
Peluh tersentuh angin laut.
Lihatlah ibu Indonesia;
Saat penglihatanmu semakin asing,
Supaya kau dapat mengingat
Kecantikan asli dari bangsamu.

Jika kau ingin menjadi cantik, sehat, berbudi, dan kreatif,
Selamat datang di duniaku, bumi Ibu Indonesia.

Aku tak tahu syariat Islam,
Yang kutahu suara kidung Ibu Indonesia, sangatlah elok,
Lebih merdu dari alunan azanmu.

Gemulai gerak tarinya adalah ibadah,
Semurni irama puja kepada Illahi.

Nafas doanya berpadu cipta,
Helai demi helai benang tertenun,
Lelehan demi lelehan damar mengalun,
Canting menggores ayat ayat alam surgawi.

Pandanglah, Ibu Indonesia,
Saat pandanganmu semakin pudar,
Supaya kau dapat mengetahui kemolekan sejati dari bangsamu
Sudah sejak dahulu kala riwayat bangsa beradab ini cinta dan hormat kepada ibu Indonesia dan kaumnya."

Translated

"Although I am no expert in the law of Islam,
What I do know is that Indonesian women’s hair bun saris are very beautiful,
More beautiful than your veil.

So perfectly folded is the hair,
As perfect as the fabric that enfolds your form,
Her endlessly diverse creative senses,
Fuse with the essence of the world around.

Fingers with the scent of forest resin,
Perspiration touched by sea breezes.
Look, mother Indonesia;
When your vision is becoming more foreign,
So you can remember
The original beauty of your country.

If you wish to become beautiful, healthy, virtuous and creative
Welcome to my world, land of mother Indonesia.

Although I am no expert in the law of Islam,
What I do know is the sound of the lullaby of mother Indonesia is very beautiful,
More melodious than your call to prayer.

The gracious movements of her dance is holy service
As pure as the rhythm of divine worship
The breath of her prayer combines with creativity
Strand by strand the yarn is woven
Drip by drip the soft wax flows
The wax pen etching holy verses of the heavenly realm

Look, mother Indonesia,
As your sight grows dim,
So you can understand the true beauty of your country

For ages past the history of this civilised country has been love and respect for mother Indonesia and her people.

— Sukmawati Sukarno Putri, 2018

On 28 March 2018, Sukmawati recited a poem deemed offensive and blasphemous by some Muslims. Her poem, Ibu Indonesia (Mother Indonesia) was recited at the 29 Years of Anne Avantie Work event at Indonesia Fashion Week 2018 and intended to celebrate Indonesian fashion and tradition, which she compared to imported Islamic fashion and tradition. Amron Ansyhari of Hanura Party and lawyer Denny Andrian Kusdayat on 3 April reported Sukmawati to Jakarta Police for alleged blasphemy. Denny, who had in 2012 been jailed for extortion, claimed Sukmawati had belittled God by saying Mother Indonesia's ballad was more soothing than the Islamic call to prayer.

On 2 April, Presidium Alumni 212 administrator Kapitra Ampera said that the alleged violation was borderline religious blasphemy. Ampera, who is also Rizieq Shihab's lawyer, said "there is (a strong allegation) of discrediting religion. The Azan is a call to worship." as a response, Sukmawati denied this allegation, saying that her poem "has no-SARA." (SARA being an acronym for Ethnicity, Religion, Race and Intergroups (in indonesian: Suku, Agama, Ras, dan Antargolongan.) Sukmawati assumes that mothers in Eastern Indonesia do not know sharia.

Though on 4 April, Sukmawati apologized to all Indonesian Muslims, saying she was especially sorry to those who felt offended by the poem. On the same day, another two organizations, the Indonesian Ulema Defense Team (TPUI) and the Indonesian Islamic Student Movement (GMII), reported Sukmawati to police, claiming her poem was an insult. On 6 April, conservative Muslims, including children, protested in Jakarta, demanding Sukmawati be jailed. They said she should not be forgiven for the poem, whereas the Indonesian Ulemas Association and several politicians had called for forgiveness.

== Conversion to Hinduism ==
Sukmawati Sukarnoputri converted to Hinduism from Islam on 2021 October 12 in a ritual called 'Sudhi Wadani' . The ceremony took place at the Sukarno Centre Heritage Area, named after her father, located inside the Buleleng Regency in Bali. Sukmawati’s Balinese grandmother, Ida Ayu Nyoman Rai Srimben, played a major role in influencing her decision to convert to Hinduism.
