= Gusti Nurul =

Indonesian dancer (1921–2015)

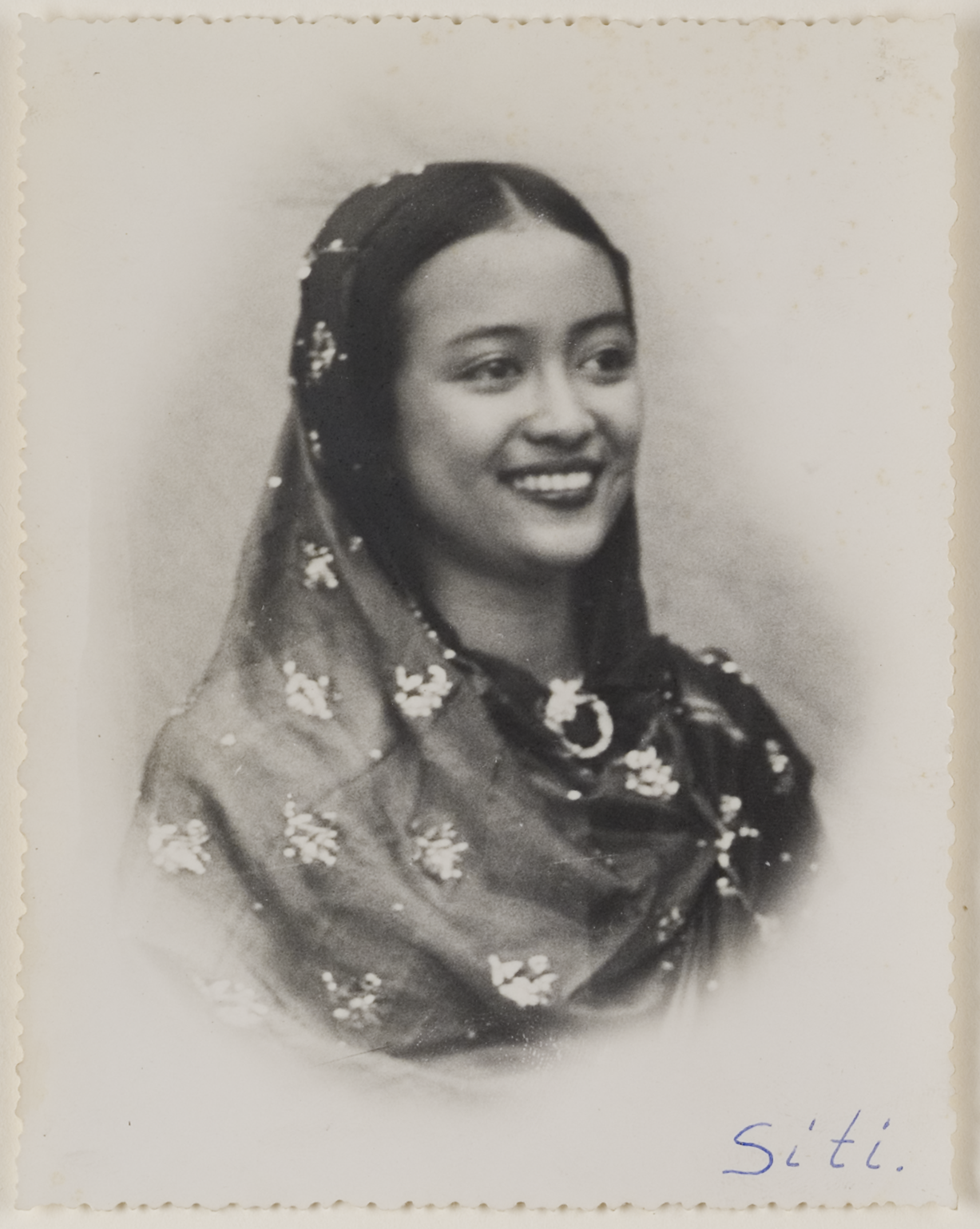
- Nurul in c. 1938
- Born: Goesti Raden Adjeng Siti Noeroel Kamaril Ngasarati Koesoemowardhani; 17 September 1921; Surakarta, Dutch East Indies
- Died: 10 November 2015 (aged 94); Bandung, West Java, Indonesia
- Spouse: Raden Mas Sujarso Surjosurarso (m. 1954; died 1999)
- Issue: Rasika Wiyarti; Bambang Atas Aji; Heruma Wiyarti; Wimaya Wiyarti; Sularso Basarah; Parimita Wiyarti; Aji Pamoso
- House: Mataram
- Father: Mangkunegara VII
- Mother: Gusti Kanjeng Ratu Timur
- Occupation: Dancer

Gusti Raden Ayu Siti Nurul Kamaril Ngasarati Kusumowardhani (17 September 1921 – 10 November 2015) was an Indonesian dancer and the only daughter of Mangkunegara VII and his consort, Gusti Kanjeng Ratu Timoer. She was known for her performance at the Princess Juliana of the Netherlands and Prince Bernhard of Lippe-Biesterfeld marriage in 1937, and for rejecting the marriage proposal from Hamengkubuwono IX, Sutan Sjahrir, and Sukarno due to not wanting to be in a polygamy.

== Early life ==
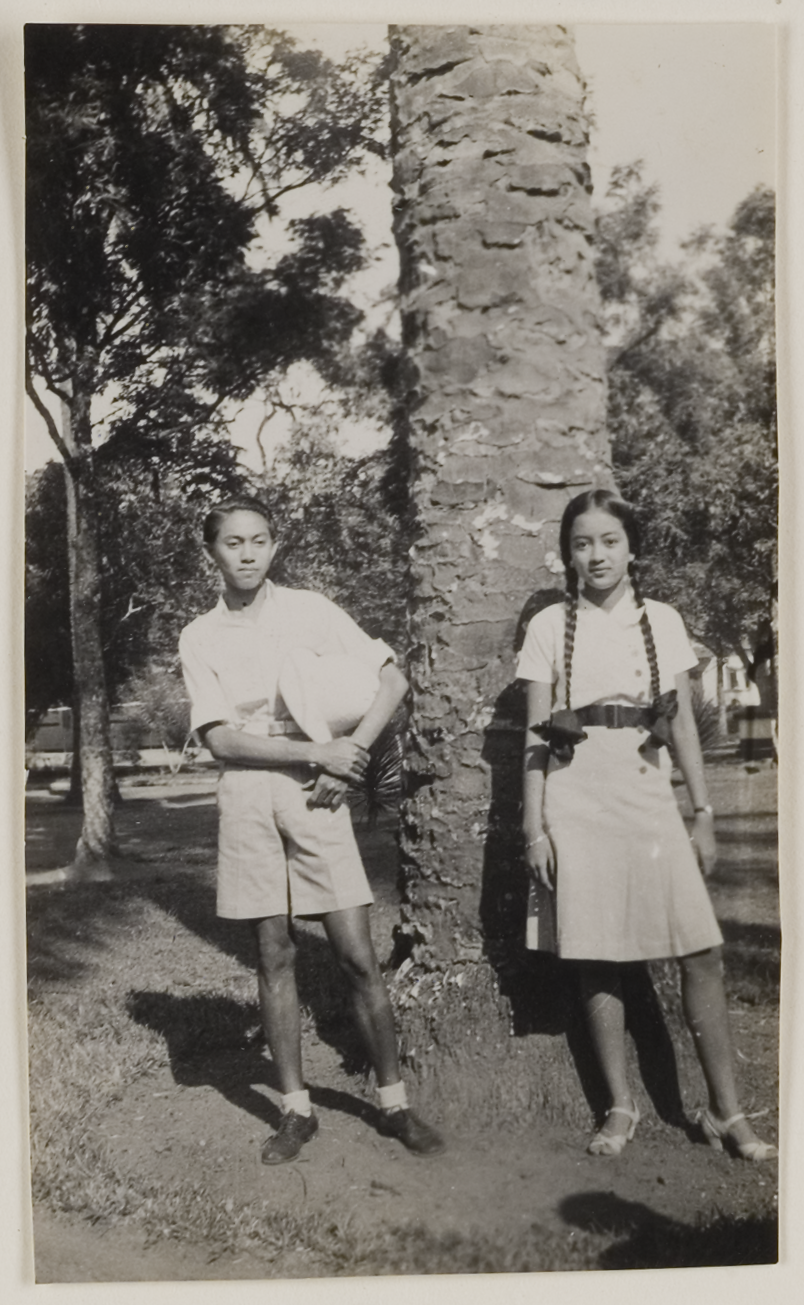
Mangkunegara VIII with Nurul in Surakarta, c. 1935

Nurul was born on 17 September 1921 in Surakarta, Dutch East Indies, as the only daughter of Mangkunegara VII and Gusti Kanjeng Ratu Timoer. She trained in dancing, making poetry, horseback riding, tennis, and swimming at a young age.

== Personal life ==
=== Marriage and relationships ===
In 1941, Nurul was proposed to by Hamengkubuwono IX. However, she refused the proposal because did not want to be in polygamy. She later said that she remembered her mother's sadness at being a mistress and her hope for her that she did not get into being a second choice.

Nurul was married to Raden Mas Sujarso Surjosurarso, a military officer who was her cousin, on 24 March 1954. At the time of their marriage, Surjosurarso was a widower and has a son from his previous marriage, Soelarso Basarah, who was born in 1946. They later moved away from Mangkunegaran Palace and lived at Surjosurarso official residence in Jakarta. They adopted a son, Bambang Atas Aji, and later moved to Bandung. In 1954, at the age of 33, Nurul gave birth to her eldest daughter and later other children at Soeti Hospital in Bandung, and named her Paramita Wiyarti. She later gave birth to her eldest son and second child, Aji Pamoso, in 1956. Her younger daughter and third child, Rasika Wiyarti, was born in 1957, followed by her fourth child, Heruma Wiyarti.

After the birth of their four children they moved to Washington, D.C., following Surjosurarso who became a military attaché. Nurul later gave birth to her fifth and youngest child, Wimaya Wiwarti, in United States. After completing their assignment in the US, Nurul and her family returned to Indonesia. Her husband was appointed Chancellor of the Bandung Polytechnic of Textile Technology.

=== Death ===
Nurul died in Bandung, West Java, on 10 November 2015 at the age of 94.

== Career ==
In 1936, Nurul was invited to Netherlands as a dancer at the marriage of Princess Juliana of the Netherlands and Prince Bernhard of Lippe-Biesterfeld. She traveled with a dance troupe using a Marnix ship from Surakarta in August 1936 and arrived in Den Haag on 1 December. Mangkunegara VII proposed the Sari Manunggal dance which would be performed by Gusti Nurul to be included in the core agenda of the wedding, but the wedding committee objected to this suggestion as the time of preparations being tight and complicated. However, the committee later accepted after being convinced by Mangkunegara VII.

On 6 January 1937, Nurul performed the Sari Manunggal dance accompanied by the chanting of the gamelan Kiai Kanyut Mesem which was played from Mangkunegaran temple in Surakarta. Her performance was watched by Dutch state officials, kings and queens from various countries, as well as the bride and groom. The gamelan was broadcast live via the Solosche Radio Vereeniging (SRV) radio station to the Netherlands without a cable and the quality of the waves at that time had disturbed the gamelan sound from SRV radio. GKR Timur, who was sitting near the stage, accompanied Nurul on the dances process. After Nurul finished the dance, Queen Wilhelmina of the Netherlands approached Mangkunegara VII and GKR Timur saying that she had never seen a dance so beautiful, and later praised Nurul's performance. Nurul's performance became a headline at the Netherlands newspaper reported as a gift from Mangkunegara VII to the wedding, and several of the guests were reported to be interested in learning Eastern culture after seeing Nurul's dance. She was featured in Life magazine on 25 January 1937.

In 1998, Nurul was awarded Citra Wanita Pembangunan Indonesia from the Indonesian Minister of State for the role of women, Mien Sugandhi. She later said that she give the award to her family as a Javanese woman who prioritized service to her family.

== Ancestry ==
Ancestors of Gusti Nurul

Mangkunegara IV
Mangkunegara V
Kanjeng Bendara Raden Ayu Adipati Mangkunegara
Mangkunegara VII
Bendara Raden Purnamaningrum
Gusti Raden Ayu Siti Nurul Kamaril Ngasarati Kusumawardhani
Hamengkubuwana VI
Hamengkubuwana VII
Gusti Kanjeng Ratu Sultan
Gusti Kanjeng Ratu Timur
Bendara Pangeran Harya Hadinegara
Gusti Kanjeng Ratu Kencana
