= List of current non-sovereign Asian monarchs =

This is a list of reigning non-sovereign monarchs in Asia, including traditional rulers and governing constitutional monarchs, but not the kings of Bahrain, Bhutan, Cambodia, Jordan, Saudi Arabia or Thailand, the emperor of Japan, the sultans of Brunei or Oman, or the emirs of Kuwait or Qatar. Each monarch listed below reigns over a legally recognised dominion, but in most cases possess little or no sovereign governing power. Their titles, however, are recognised by the state. Entries are listed beside their respective dominions, and are grouped by country.

== Bangladesh ==
State	Polity	Monarch	Since	House	Succession	Refs
Bangladesh	Bohmong (Note: The Bohmong Raja is recognised by the government of Bangladesh as the leader of the Marma population, and the traditional king of the Bohmong Circle (Bohmong Htaung), one of three tribal circles in Bandarban District, Chittagong Hill Tracts.)	Raja Chaw Prue	1959	Chowdhury	Hereditary and elective	
Bangladesh	Chakma (Note: The Chakma Raja is recognised by the government of Bangladesh as the leader of the Chakma population, and the traditional king of the Chakma Circle, one of three tribal circles located in Rangamati Hill District, Chittagong Hill Tracts.)	Raja Debashish Roy	12 November 1971	Roy	Hereditary	
Bangladesh	Mong (Note: The Mong Raja is recognised by the government of Bangladesh as the leader of the Arakanese population, and the traditional king of the Mong Circle (Phalang Htaung), one of three tribal circles in Khagrachari District, Chittagong Hill Tracts.)	Raja Saching Prue	22 October 2008 (Note: Coronation took place 17 January 2009.)	Chowdhury	Hereditary and elective	

== India ==
State	Polity	Monarch	Since	House	Succession	Refs
India (Note: The kings of the five traditional states known collectively as the Dangs are the only royals in India whose titles are recognised by the government. Each raja receives an annual pension from the state, owing to an agreement made with the British colonial government in 1842.)	Daher-Amla	Raja Tapatrao Anandrao		Bhil	Hereditary	
India	Gadhvi	Raja Yashwant Rao (Note: The current Raja of Gadhvi has been missing since 1992. His son and heir, Karan Singh, is acting as prince regent.)		Bhil	Hereditary	
India	Linga	Raja Bhavar Singh		Bhil	Hereditary	
India	Pimpri	Raja Trikamrao Sahebrao		Bhil	Hereditary	
India	Vasurna	Raja Chandra Singh		Bhil	Hereditary	

== Indonesia ==
Present information regarding governmental recognition of traditional monarchs in Indonesia is inadequate. In some instances below, pre-colonial polities have been restored, and the royal titles of their leaders have been nominally confirmed. For example, in province of Maluku there are 545 kings who have the power to govern their respective areas at the village (negeri) level, while some others still have the status of hamlets (dusun) of the village but have their own king. In other cases, the government has refused to revive monarchies that had been abolished during the earliest years of the republic. Despite the historical suppression of these dynasties, a large number have retained their culture, identity, and their status within their own communities. Royal titles are still widely used, bestowed in formal enthronement ceremonies conducted without formal recognition from Jakarta.

In recent years, the number of dynasties receiving recognition as nominal cultural authorities has steadily increased. However, because it remains unclear as to which monarchies have not yet been recognised, the list below will contain all extant Indonesian dynasties on which there is information available. Monarchs that have explicitly been denied recognition are listed under pretenders. The Sultan of Yogyakarta and the Duke of Pakualaman are listed separately due to the constitutional nature of their position.

State	Constituent	Monarch	Since	House	Type	Succession	Refs
Indonesia	Yogyakarta	Sri Sultan Hamengkubuwono X	2 October 1988 (Note: Formally installed on 7 March 1989.)	Mataram-Hamengkubuwono	Limited (Note: While state law requires that all provincial governors be elected, in the case of Yogyakarta, the sultan is given priority during elections, and therefore is always the default governor. In addition, the reigning Pakualam (see under Java) is normally given preference when selecting the vice-governor. As in other provinces, considerable administrative power is also ceded to the central government.)	Hereditary	
Indonesia	Pakualaman	Kanjeng Gusti Pangeran Adipati Arya Paku Alam X	7 January 2016	Mataram-Pakualam	Limited	Hereditary	

Alor

State	Polity	Monarch	Since	House	Succession	Refs
Indonesia	Alor (Note: Previously this kingdom was known as Bungabali, then also known by other names Alor Besar or Dulolong.)	Raja Muhammad Marzuki Nampira		Nampira (Note: The Nampira dynasty actually originated from the Lamakera on the island of Solor (between Alor and Flores), according to local tradition. The local title for kapitan is atabeng. The Nampira dynasty previously only held the position of Kapitan Dulolong, on the other side of Kalabahi Bay (Alor Besar) was the residence of the kings of Alor from what they now call the Tulimau dynasty. Some of the kings of this dynasty were very uncooperative, not really suited to be kings and perhaps for some other reasons by the Dutch. The transfer of leadership by the Dutch in this kingdom from the Tulimau dynasty in Alor Besar to the Nampira dynasty in Dulolong occurred during the reign of Nampira Bukang ruled from 1908 to 1915. The Dutch preferred Nampira Bukang from the Nampira dynasty in Dulolong because he was educated and fluent in Dutch. As compensation, the crown prince of the Tulimau dynasty was appointed as Kapitan Lembur.)	Hereditary	
Indonesia	Batulolong	Raja Constantijn Karimalei	1996	Karimalei	Hereditary	
Indonesia	Kolana	Raja Imanuel Alexander Makunimau	4 May 2022	Makunimau (Note: A sept of the Taruwamang clan.)	Hereditary	
Indonesia	Kui	Raja Kaharuddin Kinanggi		Kinanggi	Hereditary	
Indonesia	Mataru	Raja Marthen Belamau Tansi		Padailaka (Note: Initially it was the territory of the Abui Kingdom, but during the Dutch colonial era, Abui was abolished and replaced by Mataru, which was then merged with Kui Kingdom. However, the capital and dynasty remained at Padailaka.)	Hereditary	

Bali

State	Polity	Monarch	Since	House	Succession	Refs
Indonesia	Bangli	Anak Agung Made Rai Rama	1961	Gelgel	Hereditary	
Indonesia	Buleleng	Anak Agung Ngurah Brawida	2 June 1978	Sangket (Note: A branch of the Gelgel dynasty.)	Hereditary	
Indonesia	Denpasar	Tjokorda Ngurah Jambe (Note: The rajas of Denpasar and Pamecutan, two dynastical divisions of the formerly unified kingdom of Badung, both use the hereditary regnal name "Pemecutan". Ngurah Jambe of Denpasar is formally referred to as Pemecutan IX, while Ngurah Manik of Pamecutan is known as Pemecutan XI. The numerical appendages are not interconnected.)	25 November 2005	Pemecutan (Note: A branch of the Badung dynasty.)	Hereditary	
Indonesia	Gianyar	Anak Agung Gde Agung II	22 April 1999		Hereditary	
Indonesia	Karangasem	Anak Agung Gde Agung Putra Agung	9 April 2009	Karangasem	Hereditary	
Indonesia	Kasiman	Tjokorda Ngurah Kusuma Wardhana	22 April 1989	Kasiman	Hereditary	
Indonesia	Klungkung	Dewa Agung Ida Dalem Semaraputra	10 October 2010	Klungkung	Hereditary	
Indonesia	Pamecutan	Tjokorda Ngurah Manik Parisara	1986	Pemecutan	Hereditary	
Indonesia	Tabanan	Tjokorda Anglurah	21 March 2008		Hereditary	
Indonesia	Ubud	Vacant (Note: The previous head of the royal family and the last recognised king of Ubud, Tjokorda Gde Agung Sukawati, died in 1978. His eldest son, Gde Putra, is the present head of the family. He has not yet been installed as king, however, and instead serves as prince regent.)	20 July 1978	Sukawati	Hereditary	

Java

State	Polity	Monarch	Since	House	Succession	Refs
Indonesia	Banten	Sultan Syarif Muhammad ash-Shafiuddin	11 December 2016	Surosowan	Hereditary	
Indonesia	Kacirebonan	Sultan Abdul Gani Natadiningrat III	28 October 1997	Kacirebonan (Note: A branch of the Cirebon dynasty. In 1662, the sultanate of Cirebon was divided between three branches of the ruling dynasty: (in order of seniority) Kasepuhan, Kanoman, and Kacirebonan. All three lines were nominally restored in 2002.)	Hereditary	
Indonesia	Kanoman	Sultan Muhammad Emiruddin (Note: Following the death of the previous sultan, Muhammad Djalaluddin, a dispute of succession arose between two of his sons. Muhammad Emiruddin, the current occupant of the palace, is the rightful heir to his father according to the relevant laws of succession. He was actively opposed by his elder half-brother, Muhammad Saladin, who was "installed" by his supporters on 5 March 2003. Saladin later renounced his claim on 12 September 2003, and the local government has recognised Emiruddin as the sole successor.)	6 March 2003	Kanoman	Hereditary	
Indonesia	Kasepuhan	Sultan Sepuh XIV	30 April 2010	Kasepuhan	Hereditary	
Indonesia	Mangkunegaran	Kanjeng Gusti Pangeran Adipati Arya Mangkunegara X	12 March 2022	Mataram-Mangkunegara (Note: A branch of the Kartasura dynasty.)	Hereditary	
Indonesia	Sumedang (Note: Now it covers the entire Sumedang Regency area.)	Sri Radya Lukman Soemadisoeria		Sumedang Larang	Hereditary	
Indonesia	Surakarta (Note: Also commonly known as Solo.)	Sri Susuhunan Pakubuwono XIV		Mataram-Pakubuwono	Hereditary	

Kalimantan

State	Polity	Monarch	Since	House	Succession	Refs
Indonesia	Banjarmasin	Sultan Khairul Saleh	24 July 2010	Alwatzkubillah (Note: A Banjar dynasty.)	Hereditary	
Indonesia	Bulungan	Sultan Abdul Hamid	2 December 2008		Hereditary	
Indonesia	Kutai	Sultan Aji Muhammad Arifin		Kutai (Note: A Dayak dynasty.)	Hereditary	
Indonesia	Kubu	Tuan Besar Syarif Ibrahim bin Syarif Nyoh	4 March 2008	Al Idrus	Hereditary	
Indonesia	Kotawaringin	Pangeran Ratu Alidin Sukma Alamsyah	2010	Alwatzkubillah	Hereditary	
Indonesia	Landak	Pangeran Ratu Suryansyah Amiruddin	24 January 2000	Ismahayana	Hereditary	
Indonesia	Matan	Pangeran Ratu Uti Iwan Kusnadi	11 August 2004		Hereditary	
Indonesia	Mempawah	Pangeran Ratu Mulawangsa Mardan Adijaya	12 August 2002	Amantubillah (Note: A House of Royal Buginese Mempawah)	Hereditary	
Indonesia	Paser	Pangeran Ratu Abdul Rasyid	16 October 2000	Belengkong	Hereditary	
Indonesia	Pontianak	Sultan Syarif Mahmud Alkadrie	17 July 2017	Al Kadri (Note: Also known as the Alkadrie, Kadriah, or Kadariah dynasty.)	Hereditary	
Indonesia	Sambaliung	Sultan Fachruddin	19 October 2009	Berau	Hereditary	
Indonesia	Sambas	Pangeran Ratu Muhammad Tarhan	3 February 2008 (Note: Muhammad Tarhan succeeded as head of the royal family following the death of his father in 2008. Like his father, however, he has not been installed as sultan, and instead acts as prince regent. He is also a minor, born in 1993.)	Alwatzkubillah	Hereditary	
Indonesia	Sanggau	Pangeran Ratu Arman Surya	26 July 2009	Suryanegara	Hereditary	
Indonesia	Sekadau	Pangeran Agung Muhammad Efendi	28 February 2009		Hereditary	
Indonesia	Selimbau	Panembahan Muhammad Asbi	2004	Assidiqi	Hereditary	
Indonesia	Simpang (Note: Also commonly written as Sampang.)	Sultan Muhammad Jamaluddin II	31 May 2008		Hereditary	
Indonesia	Sintang	Panembahan Kusuma Negara V	17 September 2003 (Note: Muhammad Ikhsani Syafiuddin was recognised as Panembahan of Sintang by the government in 2003. He was formally enthroned as Panembahan Sri Kusuma Negara V on 26 September 2005.)	Kusumanegara	Hereditary	

Maluku Islands

State	Polity	Monarch	Since	House	Succession	Refs
Indonesia	Amahai	Upu Latu Johan Dominggus Hallatu	1954	Hallatu Ruma Iralo	Hereditary and elective	
Indonesia	Atiahu	Jou Muhammadiyah Wailissa		Wailissa	Hereditary	
Indonesia	Bacan	Sultan Al-Abd-Al-Rahim Gary bin Gahral	19 November 2010	Kamarullah	Hereditary and elective (Note: The sultan is selected from amongst a group of royal candidates by a council of the family's four main branches: Iskandar Alam, Tarafannur, Kamarullah, and Tunggulawang, each of which is descended from a past sultan. Since 1797, the sultans have been exclusively of the Kamarullah branch.)	
Indonesia	Bicoli	Sangaji Samaun Seba		Seba	Hereditary	
Indonesia	Faan	Raja Patris Renwarin	April 2002	Renwarin	Hereditary	
Indonesia	Geser	Raja Soelani Kilian	30 January 2019	Kilian	Hereditary	
Indonesia	Hitu	Upu Latu Salhana Pellu	21 March 2007	Hitulama	Hereditary	
Indonesia	Jailolo	Sultan Abdullah Syah	January 2002		Hereditary	
Indonesia	Kisar	Raja Johannis Bakker		Bakker	Hereditary	
Indonesia	Loloda	Jogugu Lutfi Muhammad Syamsuddin	30 August 2009	Syamsuddin	Hereditary	
Indonesia	Pelauw	Upu Latu Roni Herly Latuconsina	6 February 2025	Latuconsina	Hereditary	
Indonesia	Soya	Raja Johan Lodewijk Rehatta	9 December 2005 (Note: Lodewijk was selected as raja on 24 May 2005. He was installed later, in December of the same year.)	Rehatta (Note: A branch of the House of Pesulima, which is descended from the Majapahit kings of Java.)	Hereditary and elective	
Indonesia	Tagalisa	Raja Muhammad Tasalisa	27 October 2022	Tasalisa	Hereditary	
Indonesia	Tulehu	Upu Latu John Saleh Ohorella	13 February 2003	Ohorella	Hereditary	
Indonesia	Ternate	Sultan Hidayatullah Sjah (Note: Since 1380, the rulers of Ternate have also held the title Kolano Maloko, which denotes supremacy among the Moluccan sultanates. Prior to then it had been worn by the ruler of Jailolo.)	18 December 2021		Hereditary	
Indonesia	Tidore	Sultan Djafar Syah	28 October 1999		Hereditary	
Indonesia	Urung	Jou Ibrahim M.H. Wokas	1977	Wokas	Hereditary	

Papua

State	Polity	Monarch	Since	House	Succession	Refs
Indonesia	Arguni	Raja Hanafi Pauspaus		Pauspaus (Note: The royal family of is well known for producing albino kings, hence the king is often called Raja Bule.)	Hereditary	
Indonesia	Atiati	Raja Muhammad Syahrul Yusuf Bay	14 February 2018	Kerewaindżai (Note: The royal family of Atiati is descended from the neighbouring dynasty of Rumbati (Menaue Bauw).)	Hereditary	
Indonesia	Fatagar	Raja Taufiq Heru	31 December 2009	Uswanas (Note: The royal family of Fatagar is descended from the neighbouring dynasty of Rumbati.)	Hereditary	
Indonesia	Kaibus	Woronemin Melkianus Kondjol	1990s	Kondjol (Note: The royal family was handed over to the Tehit clan, namely Kondjol. It also held control over other Tehit rulers and was considered the highest.)	Hereditary	
Indonesia	Kaimana	Rat Umis Abdul Hakim Achmad	1980	Aituarauw (Note: A Kowiai dynasty.)	Hereditary	
Indonesia	Namatota	Ratu Randi Asnawi Ombaier	2017	Ombaier	Hereditary	
Indonesia	Patipi	Raja Atarai Iba (Note: The last raja of Patipi, Usman Iba, died in 2003. His brother, Achmad Iba, served as regent until 2022 when the late raja's son, the Raja Muda Atarai Iba ascended the throne.)	2022	Sameni (Note: A sept of the Koeman Iba clan, which descends from the Segera tribe of Kampung Patipi Pasir.)	Hereditary	
Indonesia	Rumbati	Raja Hamrad Pitupuwah Bauw	2 May 2019	Bauw	Hereditary	
Indonesia	Salawati	Raja Muhammad Tahir Arfan		Arfan	Hereditary	
Indonesia	Sekar	Raja Arief Rumagesan		Rumagesan	Hereditary	
Indonesia	Wertuar	Raja Musa Heremba	15 April 1988	Heremba	Hereditary	

Rote

State	Polity	Monarch	Since	House	Succession	Refs
Indonesia	Baa	Manek Paulus Dae Pane	1998	Dae Pane	Hereditary	
Indonesia	Bokai	Manek Herman Dupe	1 January 1961 (Note: Herman Dupe was the last reigning manek of Bokai, effectively ruling from 1961 until the state was abolished by the Indonesian government in 1968. Presumably, recognition of his title was abolished concurrently. The date of the nominal restoration of this monarchy is not known.)	Dupe	Hereditary	
Indonesia	Dehla	Manek Nehemia Ndun	2 October 1972 (Note: Formal enthronement took place in 2000.)	Ndun	Hereditary	
Indonesia	Dengka	Vacant (Note: The last manek of Dengka died in 1970. His heir apparent, who has not yet acceded to the throne, is Prince Jeremias Tungga. At present, Prince Godlief Eliazar Tungga serves as prince regent.)	1970	Tungga	Hereditary	
Indonesia	Korbafo	Vacant (Note: The last manek of Korbafo, Leoanan Nathaniel Manubulu, died in 2000. The throne has remained vacant since then.)	6 March 2000	Manubulu	Hereditary	
Indonesia	Landu	Vacant (Note: The last manek of Landu, Marthen Matheos Johannes, died in 2008. His son Willem Marthen Johannes is the heir apparent, but has not been enthroned. He serves as prince regent.)	18 March 2008	Johannes	Hereditary	
Indonesia	Lelain	Manek Yunus Besi		Besi	Hereditary	
Indonesia	Lelenuk	Manek Christoffel Daik	28 September 1994	Daik	Hereditary	
Indonesia	Loleh	Manek Soleman Zacharias	15 July 2003 (Note: Formal enthronement took place in 2004.)	Zacharias	Hereditary	
Indonesia	Ndao	Manek Soleman Kotten	1968	Kotten	Hereditary	
Indonesia	Oenale	Manek Christoffel Hanok Lenggu		Lenggu	Hereditary	
Indonesia	Oepao	Manek Jefry Sjioen	2005	Sjioen	Hereditary	
Indonesia	Ringgou	Vacant (Note: The last manek of Ringgou, Hendrik Daoed, died in 2002. His son Christian Daoed is the heir apparent, but has not yet been enthroned. He serves as prince regent.)	22 March 2002	Daoed	Hereditary	
Indonesia	Termanu	Manek Soleman Jeremias Amalo (Note: Known within his community as "Bea". According to sources, the throne was scheduled to pass to Soleman's brother, Joël Amalo, in 2009. This has not been confirmed.)	14 October 2007	Amalo	Hereditary	
Indonesia	Thie	Vacant (Note: The last manek of Thie, Benjamin Messakh, died in 2010. His successor has yet to be confirmed.)	25 January 2010	Mburalae	Hereditary	

Sulawesi

State	Polity	Monarch	Since	House	Succession	Refs
Indonesia	Balangnipa	Maradia Fadly Patayangi	19 November 2005		Hereditary	
Indonesia	Banawa	Vacant (Note: The last raja, Adam Ardjad Lamarauna, died in 2006. His son and heir, Wajar Lamarauna, has yet to be formally installed as his successor.)	16 November 2006		Hereditary	
Indonesia	Banggai	Tomundo Mohamad Fikran Ramadhan (Note: The present tomundo, born in 1993, is a minor, and reigns alongside a regent.)	29 January 2010	Awaluddin	Hereditary	
Indonesia	Barru	Vacant (Note: The throne of the arung of Barru has been vacant for over fifty years. Since then, the head of the royal family is Hasanuddin Petta Tawang, who acts as regent.)		House of Royal Buginese Barru	Hereditary	
Indonesia	Bone	Arumpone Baso Hamid	7 April 2006	House of Royal Buginese Bone	Hereditary	
Indonesia	Buton (Note: Also written as Butung, or in Dutch as Boeton.)	Sultan La Ode Mohammad Izat Manarfa	27 November 2006	Kumbewahatak	Hereditary	
Indonesia	Gowa	Sultan Kumala Idjo Batara Gowa III (Note: The deposed monarchy of Gowa, also known after its capital Makassar, was nominally restored by the government in 2001. With the leadership of the House of Royal Buginese Gowa. The throne of the Somba has been vacant since then. The current head of the royal family (since 1978), and heir to the throne, is Andi Kumala Karaeng Sila.)	2014		Hereditary	
Indonesia	Luwu	Tuanku Datu Haji Andi Maradang Mackulau	December 2012	House of Royal Buginese Luwu	Hereditary	
Indonesia	Mamuju	Maradia Maksum Dai		Mak Lonjok	Hereditary	
Indonesia	Mori	Vacant (Note: The throne of the mokole of Mori is vacant. The present head of the royal family is Kumampu Marunduh. There are reportedly plans to install a young prince as mokole in the near future.)			Hereditary	
Indonesia	Sanrabone	Karaeng Ali Mallombasi	25 July 2008	Sanrabone	Hereditary	
Indonesia	Soppeng	Datu Unru Mappanjantji	2001		Hereditary	

Sumatra

State	Polity	Monarch	Since	House	Succession	Refs
Indonesia	Air Tiris	Diraja H.M. Yunus Datuk Sutan Batuah	26 September 2021	Bendang (Note: Bendang is one of the Kampar matrilineal tribes (suku) in the 12 kenegerian of Air Tiris.)	Hereditary	
Indonesia	Asahan	Sultan Kamal Abrahim	17 May 1980 (Note: Became head of the royal family upon the death of his father on 6 April 1980; he was formally enthroned later in May.)	Pinangawan	Hereditary	
Indonesia	Bakkara (Note: Also commonly written as Bangkara.)	Raja Sisingamangaraja XV (Note: Also known by his birth name, Tonggo Tua Sinambela. It is unclear whether or not he has been recognised, or enthroned.)	24 December 1972	Sinambela (Note: A Batak dynasty.)	Hereditary	
Indonesia	Deli	Sultan Aria Lamanjiji (Note: The present sultan, born in 1997, is a minor. His grand uncle, the Raja Muda Tengku Hamdi Osman, acts as regent.)	22 July 2005	Maimun	Hereditary	
Indonesia	Dolok Silau	Raja Tanjar Gaim Purba Tambak	23 November 2008	Purba	Hereditary	
Indonesia	Indragiri	Sultan Tengku Arief	1 February 1986		Hereditary	
Indonesia	Jambi	Sultan Abdurrahman Taha Syaifuddin Syah	18 March 2012		Hereditary and elective	
Indonesia	Langkat	Sultan Azwar Abdul Jalil	21 May 2003		Hereditary and elective	
Indonesia	Pagaruyung	Raja Alam Muhammad Taufik Thaib (Note: The Pagaruyung kingdom was traditionally headed by a tripartite monarchy, consisting of the Raja Alam, the Raja Adat and the Raja Ibadat, collectively known as the "Kings of the Three Seats". The latter two were religious titles, while the first was considered the paramount ruler (or emperor) of the temporal world.)	10 June 2007	Adityawarman (Note: A Minangkabau dynasty. The seat of the Minangkabau emperor, who is considered the paramount monarch of all Minangkabauw people in Sumatra and Malaya, is Pagaruyung.)	Hereditary	
Indonesia	Palembang	Sultan Mahmud Badaruddin III	4 March 2003		Hereditary	
Indonesia	Pelalawan	Tengku Besar Kamaruddin bin Harun	7 August 2008	Al Shahab	Hereditary	
Indonesia	Serdang	Sultan Basyarsyah II	28 January 2001 (Note: Formally enthroned in January 2003, after having been recognised by the government.)	Alamsyah	Hereditary	
Indonesia	Siguntur	Sultan Hendri Tuanku Bagindo Ratu	1968	Siguntur	Hereditary	

Timor

State	Polity	Monarch	Since	House	Succession	Refs
Indonesia	Amanatun	Usif Pah Gustaf Immanuel (Note: Known within his community as "Gia".)	26 September 1996	Banunaek (Note: An Atoni dynasty.)	Hereditary	
Indonesia	Amanuban	Usif Pah Nesi Nope	1980	Nope (Note: An Atoni dynasty. Maternally, members of the royal family also belong to the Nitbani and Asbanu clans.)	Hereditary	
Indonesia	Amarasi	Usif Pah Robert Maurits Koroh	1990	Koroh (Note: The royal family of Amarasi was originally an Atoni dynasty. However, the current lineage is descended from the Dj'awa dynasty of Savu.)	Hereditary	
Indonesia	Amfoang	Usif Pah Robert Gordon Manoh	27 September 2001	Manoch	Hereditary	
Indonesia	Biboki	Usif Pah Johanis Tnesi Us		Boko	Hereditary	
Indonesia	Boti	Usif Pah Nama Benu	March 2005 (Note: Formally enthroned in March 2007.)	Benu	Hereditary	
Indonesia	Fialaran (Note: This kingdom also known as Tasifeto)	Loro Jadokus Manek	1990	Da Costa (Note: A Topass dynasty.)	Hereditary	
Indonesia	Insana	Usif Pah Theodorus Taolin (Note: Known within his community as "Olis", or "Ulis".)	1991	Taolin	Hereditary	
Indonesia	Kupang	Usif Pah Leopold Nicolaas Nisnoni (Note: Kupang, named after its capital, was formed as a confederation of Timorese fiefdoms: Amabi, Foenay, Sonbai Kecil, Taebenu, and the Helong. Leopold Nisnoni, known within his community as "Isu", is the chief of Sonbai Kecil, and has also been accepted as ruler of the confederacy. The other chiefs are: Gideon Broery of Amabi, Esthon Leyloh of Foenay (also spelled Funai), and Daud Tanof of Taebenu. The present chief of the Helong nation is Soleman Bislissin. They are all hereditary positions.)	July 2004 (Note: Leopold succeeded as head of the royal family of Sonbai Kecil upon the death of his father on 14 November 1992. He was proclaimed regent of the Kupang confederacy in 1993. He was formally installed as king in 2004.)	Nisnoni	Elective and hereditary	
Indonesia	Lamaknen	Loro Josef Kalimau	16 October 2003	Bunak (Note: While the elected loros do not belong to any one royal lineage, succession has historically been limited to the Bunak people.)	Elective and hereditary (Note: Lamaknen was formed as a confederation of small Timorese fiefdoms. Its monarch is elected by the hereditary chiefs of each constituent state. The chiefs themselves are not normally considered candidates for election.)	
Indonesia	Miomaffo (Note: Originally subordinate to the Sonbai kingdom under the name of Amakono.)	Usif Pah Alfons Kono	1986	Kono	Hereditary	
Indonesia	Mollo	Usif Pah Edison Oematan	12 August 2001	Oematan	Hereditary	
Indonesia	Noimuti	Usif Pah Antonius da Costa		Da Costa	Hereditary	
Indonesia	Wehali	Disputed (Note: The recognised liurai died in 2003. His longtime rival, Dominikus Tei Serang, from another branch of the royal family, was "enthroned" by his supporters on 9 August 2003. It is unclear whether his title has been recognised. At present, there are other claimants to the throne.)	11 May 2003	Waihale (Note: A Tetun dynasty.)	Hereditary	

Others

State	Polity	Monarch	Since	House	Succession	Refs
Indonesia	Anakalang	Raja Sappi Pateduk II	1992		Hereditary	
Indonesia	Baranusa	Raja Akbar Salim (Note: Sovereignty in Barnusa was historically divided between two ruling clans: the Baso and the Blegur, the leaders of which both wore the title Raja of Baranusa. The Blegur raja was later given the lesser title kapitan by the Dutch colonial government. The title remains hereditary and prestige is traditionally divided equally. The current Kapitan is Bastian C. Blegur (since 1973).)		Baso	Hereditary	
Indonesia	Bima	Jena Teke Zulkarnain (Note: Pending his formal coronation as Sultan Bima XV, Iskandar Zulkarnain wears the title of crown prince. Acting as princess regent (since May 2001) is his aunt, Siti Maryam Salahuddin.)	17 June 2001 (Note: Became head of the royal family upon the death of his father on 3 May 2001. He was invested with the title of heir apparent later in June, but has not yet been formally enthroned as sultan.)	Dewa Dalam Bawa	Hereditary	
Indonesia	Dompu	Vacant (Note: Dompu's last sultan was Muhammad Tajularifin Sirajuddin II, who died in 1964. Since then, the throne has remained vacant, and succession is disputed between two of the late sultan's sons: Prince Abdul Azis, and his younger half-brother Prince Kaharul Zaman. Neither have been enthroned, although the latter is apparently considered the head of the family.)	1964	Sirajuddin	Hereditary	
Indonesia	Lamakera	Raja Abdul Gafur Ibrahim	1987	Dasi	Hereditary	
Indonesia	Lewa	Raja Pingi Ai	23 January 1978		Hereditary	
Indonesia	Lohayong	Sengaji Muhamad Idrus	February 2008	Kalake	Hereditary	
Indonesia	Riau-Lingga	Sultan Abdul Rahman Muazzam Shah ibni Almarhum Yamtuan Muda Riau X Raja Muhammad Yusuf	8 April 1964	House of Royal Buginese Riau (Note: The current dynasty is descended from the royal family of Terengganu, and are of mixed Malay and Bugis descent. Historically, the sultan's family, who were Malay, was based in Lingga, whilst a viceroy, who was always of Bugis descent, governed the Riau Islands. The two ruling lines merged in 1899.)	Hereditary	
Indonesia	Sumbawa	Sultan Muhammad Kaharuddin IV	5 April 2011	Kaharuddin	Hereditary	

== Malaysia ==
State	Constituent	Monarch	Since	House	Type	Succession	Refs
Malaysia	Johor	Sultan Ibrahim Ismail	22 January 2010 (Note: Formally installed on the following day. Tengku Ibrahim ruled as prince regent between 26 April 1984 and 25 April 1989, whilst the incumbent sultan ruled as King of Malaysia.)	Temenggong	Constitutional	Hereditary	
Malaysia	Kedah	Sultan Sallehuddin	12 September 2017	Mahawangsa	Constitutional	Hereditary	
Malaysia	Kelantan	Sultan Muhammad V (Note: Prior to his assumption of the throne, Tuanku Muhammad Faris Petra had been serving as prince regent since 25 May 2009 on behalf of his father, Sultan Ismail Petra, after the elder suffered a delibitating stroke. In September 2010, the elder sultan was constitutionally deposed by the state's Succession Council in favour of Muhammad Faris.)	13 September 2010	Long Yunus	Constitutional	Hereditary	
Malaysia	Negeri Sembilan	Tuanku Muhriz	29 December 2008	Royal Pagaruyung-Negeri Sembilan	Constitutional	Hereditary and elective (Note: The Yang di-Pertuan Besar is chosen for life by the Undang Laut (four ruling chiefs of the confederated states of Negeri Sembilan) from amongst four royal princes. These princes are selected by the reigning Yang di-Pertuan Besar from amongst the senior members of the ruling line of Seri Menanti.)	
Malaysia	Pahang	Al-Sultan Sultan Abdullah	15 January 2019 (Note: Coronation took place on 15 January 2019.)	Bendahara	Constitutional	Hereditary	
Malaysia	Perak	Sultan Nazrin Shah	29 May 2014 (Note: Coronation took place on 6 May 2015.)	Siak-Perak	Constitutional	Hereditary	
Malaysia	Perlis	Tuanku Syed Sirajuddin	17 April 2000	Jamalullail Perlis	Constitutional	Hereditary	
Malaysia	Selangor	Sultan Sharafuddin	21 November 2001 (Note: Formally installed on the following day. Sharafuddin, then known as Tengku Idris Shah, ruled as prince regent between 26 April 1999 and 21 November 2001, whilst the incumbent sultan ruled as King of Malaysia.)	Opu Daeng Chelak	Constitutional	Hereditary	
Malaysia	Terengganu	Sultan Mizan Zainal Abidin	16 May 1998 (Note: Formally installed 26 May 1998. Coronation took place on 4 March 1999. Tuanku Mizan had served as acting sultan between 20 October and 8 November 1990.)	Bendahara	Constitutional	Hereditary	

State	Polity	Monarch	Since	House	Succession	Refs
Negeri Sembilan (Note: These traditional chiefdoms are part of the confederacy of Negeri Sembilan, a federated state of Malaysia. The ruling chiefs of Jelebu, Johol, Rembau, and Sungai Ujong form the Undang Laut, who will decide the next Yang di-Pertuan Besar of Negeri Sembilan. Tampin is a separate hereditary principality. Naning is situated in the state of Malacca.)	Jelebu	Dato' Mendika Menteri Akhirulzaman Dato' Haji Maarof bin Haji Mat Rashad	2018	House of Kemim	Elective and hereditary (Note: The undang (ruling chief) is elected for life by the nobles and vassals of the state from amongst the three highest noble families: the Waris Ulu Jelebu, Waris Sarin, and Waris Kemin.)	
Negeri Sembilan	Johol	Dato' Johan Pahlawan Lela Perkasa Setiawan Dato' Muhammad bin Haji Abdullah	27 March 2016	House of Gemencheh	Elective and hereditary (Note: The undang (ruling chief) is elected for life by the nobles and vassals of the state from amongst the male descendants of the first ruler, following the matrilineal line.)	
Negeri Sembilan	Naning (Note: Naning was part of Negeri Sembilan from 1641 to 1832. It is now part of Malacca.)	Dato' Mohd Nazrol Bin Mahamad Sapar	2020		Elective and hereditary	
Negeri Sembilan	Rembau			House of Jakun	Elective and hereditary (Note: The undang (ruling chief) is elected for life by the nobles and vassals of the state from amongst the direct descendants of two noble families: the Waris Jakun and Waris Jawa. The position is, by informal agreement, alternated between the heads of the two houses.)	
Negeri Sembilan	Sungai Ujong	Dato' Klana Petra Dato' Mubarak Dohak	29 December 1993	House of Hulu	Elective and hereditary (Note: The undang (ruling chief) is elected for life by the nobles and vassals of the state from amongst the direct descendants of two noble families: the Waris Hulu and Waris Hilir.)	
Negeri Sembilan	Tampin	Tunku Syed Razman bin Tunku Syed Idrus Al-Qadri	26 December 2005 (Note: Formally enthroned on 12 August 2006.)	House of Al Qadri	Hereditary (Note: The Yang di-Pertuan Muda (prince) succeeds according to the laws of male primogeniture, but must also receive confirmation from the reigning Yang di-Pertuan Besar of Negeri Sembilan.)	

== Philippines ==
State	Polity	Monarch	Since	House	Succession	Refs
Philippines	Buayan	Sultan Mohammad Amil Kusain	28 June 2008	Camsa	Hereditary	
Philippines	Lanao (Note: The Kingdom of Lanao, or Ranao, is traditionally a federation composed of sixteen primary sultanates. Each sultanate, headed by an hereditary royal house, represents a different clan of the Maranaos. In addition to the primary sultanates, there are a further twenty-eight lesser (termed "legislative") sultanates, which are the guardians of the Maranao taritib (tradition). The federation is headed by a supreme sultan, chosen from amongst the royal lineages of the lesser sultanates. The sixteen primary sultans are also listed above; the others are not. This customary system of traditional society is recognised by the Philippine government.)	Sultan Mastura Manabilang	25 May 1996	Ranao	Elective	
Philippines	Maguindanao	Macapado Benito (Note: The throne of Maguindanao is under Macapado Benito since the assassination of the last sultan, Amir bin Muhammad Baraguir, in early 2006. His eldest son, Ammar Yassir, is prince regent and head of the royal household.)	11 January 2006	Kudarat	Hereditary	
Philippines	Panay	Sultan Cipriano Querol Jr.	13 February 2011	Querol	Unclear	
Philippines	Sulu	Sultan Muedzul Lail-Tan Kiram	16 September 2012	Kiram	Hereditary	
Philippines	Talayan	Datu Ali Midtimbang		Midtimbang	Hereditary	
Philippines	Talik	Sultan Col. Datu Nasser	13 August 2005	Pendatun	Hereditary	
Philippines	Lanao confederates					
Philippines	Bacolod	Sultan Madki Maurak		Bacolod (Note: A clan of the Maranaos.)	Hereditary	
Philippines	Balo-i	Sultan Ysmael Mimbala Ali		Balo-i	Hereditary	
Philippines	Bansayan	Sultan Calicozaman Basman		Bansayan	Hereditary	
Philippines	Bayang	Sultan Ali Manding		Bayang	Hereditary	
Philippines	Binidayan	Sultan Abdullah Dimaporo Datumulok		Binidayan	Hereditary	
Philippines	Borocot	Sultan Saidali Baniaga		Dirampaten	Hereditary	
Philippines	Butig	Sultan Nasroden Ador		Butig	Hereditary	
Philippines	Cabugatan	Datu Manaros Simbaan		Cabugatan	Hereditary	
Philippines	Ditsaan	Sultan Tamano Pandapata		Ditsaan	Hereditary	
Philippines	Dumalondong	Sultan Macaurog Guinar		Domalondong	Hereditary	
Philippines	Maribo	Sultan Nasser Magomnang		Maribo	Hereditary	
Philippines	Masiu	Sultan Topaan Disomimba	4 February 2002	Masiu	Hereditary	
Philippines	Minitupad	Sultan Pagaranganan Mitmug		Minitupad	Hereditary	
Philippines	Pagayawan	Sultan Mamasaranao Mulok		Pagayawan	Hereditary	
Philippines	Ramain	Sultan Patadatu Bayas	11 December 2002	Ramain	Hereditary	
Philippines	Rogon	Sultan Bangcola Adtha		Rogon	Hereditary	
Philippines	Taporog	Sultan Farouk Sharif	July 1998	Taporog	Hereditary	
Philippines	Unayan	Sultan Ibno Roy Tupas	12 February 2016	Unayan	Hereditary	

== Thailand ==
State	Constituent	Monarch	Since	House	Type	Succession	Refs
Thailand	Chiang Mai	Chao Wongsak Na Chiang Mai	29 May 1989	House of Na Chiang Mai (Dibayachakkradhiwongse dynasty)	Nobility	Hereditary	
Thailand	Lamphun	AVM Chao Wattanan Na Lamphun	21 February 1995	House of Na Lamphun (Dibayachakkradhiwongse dynasty)	Nobility	Hereditary	
Thailand	Lampang	Chao Srirat Na Lampang	30 June 2015	House of Na Lampang (Dibayachakkradhiwongse dynasty)	Nobility	Hereditary	
Thailand	Nan	Chao Sompratthana Na Nan	since 1999	House of Na Nan (Tinmahawong Dynasty)	Nobility	Hereditary	
Myanmar	Kengtung (officially abolished by Myanmar in 1962)	Chao or Sao Worachak Na Chiang Tung	c. 1955	House of Na Chiang Tung (Mangrai dynasty)	Nobility	Hereditary	

== Timor-Leste ==
State	Polity	Monarch	Since	House	Succession	Refs
Timor-Leste	Alas	Dom Alexandrina Borromeu Duarte	2002	Duarte	Hereditary	
Timor-Leste	Oecusse (Note: After the neighbouring kingdom of Ambeno was annexed in 1912, the state changed its name to Oecusse-Ambeno.)	Liurai Antonio I	4 May 2001 (Note: Antonio was recognised as liurai in 2001, but has not been installed.)	Da Costa (Note: A Topass dynasty.)	Hereditary	
Timor-Leste	Turiscai	Dom Luis F.S.S. Pereira	2017	Pereira	Hereditary	

== United Arab Emirates ==
State	Constituent	Monarch	Since	House	Type	Succession	Refs
United Arab Emirates	Abu Dhabi	Sheikh Mohamed bin Zayed Al Nahyan	14 May 2022	Al Nahyan (Note: The Al Nahyan are a branch of the Al Falahi, a clan of the Yas tribe.)	Limited (Note: The emirates, whilst absolute at the regional level, also forfeit a portion of their sovereignty and administrative power to the federal government.)	Hereditary	
United Arab Emirates	Ajman	Sheikh Humaid bin Rashid Al Nuaimi III	6 September 1981	Al Nuaimi (Note: A branch of the Al Bu Kharaiban tribe.)	Limited	Hereditary	
United Arab Emirates	Dubai	Sheikh Mohammed bin Rashid	4 January 2006	Al Maktoum (Note: The Al Maktoum are a branch of the Al Falasi, a clan of the Yas tribe.)	Limited	Hereditary	
United Arab Emirates	Fujairah	Sheikh Hamad bin Mohammed	18 September 1974	Al Sharqi (Note: A branch of the Sharqiyyin tribe.)	Limited	Hereditary	
United Arab Emirates	Ras al-Khaimah	Sheikh Saud bin Saqr	27 October 2010 (Note: Saud had served as deputy ruler since 14 June 2003, effectively ruling in place of his father, Saqr bin Mohammad, who suffered from poor health.)	Al Qasimi (Note: A branch of the Al Qawasim tribe.)	Limited	Hereditary	
United Arab Emirates	Sharjah	Sheikh Sultan III bin Mohamed	23 June 1987 (Note: Sultan was initially enthroned as emir on 25 January 1972. On 17 June 1987, he was briefly deposed by his brother, Sheikh Abdul'aziz bin Muhammad, for a period of six days. Sultan regained the throne on 23 June.)	Al Qasimi	Limited	Hereditary	
United Arab Emirates	Umm al-Quwain	Sheikh Saud bin Rashid	2 January 2009	Al Mu‘alla (Note: Traditionally the head of the Al Ali tribe.)	Limited	Hereditary	

== See also ==
- Ethnarch
- List of monarchies
- Lists of monarchs
- Royal and noble ranks
- Traditional authority
- List of current constituent African monarchs
- List of current constituent Asian monarchs
- List of current constituent monarchs
- Lists of office-holders
- Heads of former ruling families
- Imperial, royal and noble ranks
- List of current monarchs of sovereign states
- List of current reigning monarchs by length of reign
- Monarchy
- Traditional authority
- Lists of office-holders
- Nobility
- Royal and noble ranks
- African royalty
- Royalty in the Americas
- Asian royalty
- European royalty
- Oceanian royalty
- Dynasties by continent
- Monarchs by continent
- Tribal chiefs
