= Daher, Dang =

Daher
- Village
- Daher
- Location in Gujarat, India Daher (India)
- Coordinates: 20°54′25″N 73°44′0″E
- Country: India
- State: Gujarat
- District: Dang

Government
  - Body: Gram Panchayat
  - Raja: Tapatrao Pawar (ceremonial purpose like Dangs Darbar)
  - Sarpanch: Raghubhai Kasubhai Salve

Area
  - Total: 6.58 km^{2} (2.54 sq mi)

Population
  - Total: 881 (According to 2,011 )

Daher is a village located on the bank of River Purna in Dang district, in the state of Gujarat. It is at 10 Mile from district headquarter of Ahwa. It was the capital of erstwhile princely state of Daher-Amla state. King of the Daher is one of the 5 kings of Dang which are only 5 royals who were recognised by Government of India. Current King of Daher is Raja Tapatrao Anandrao Pawar.

== See also ==
- Dang district, India
- List of current constituent Asian monarchs
- Dangs Darbar
- Raja Tapatrao Anandrao
