= Tapatrao Anandrao Pawar =

Indian monarch

Tapatrao Pawar
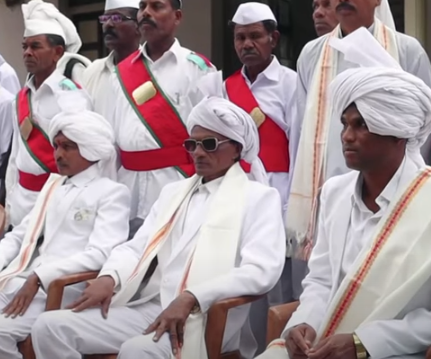
- Raja Tapatrao Pawar sitting between another two Raja of Dang district, India

Raja of Daher-Amala
- Predecessor: Anandrao Pawar
- Born: 1967 (age 58–59); Dang, Gujarat, India (53 years)
- Issue: 2 sons
Regnal name
- તપતરાઓ પવાર
- Father: Anandrao Pawar
- Religion: Hinduism

Raja Tapatrao Anandrao Pawar (born 1967) is the current Raja of Daher. He is one of the five Kings of Dang which are the only hereditary royals in India whose titles are currently recognized by the government of India owing to an agreement made with the Government in 1842.

== See also ==
- Dang district, India
- Surat Agency
- List of current constituent Asian monarchs
- Daher, Dang
