= Mangku Alam II =

KGPAA Mangku Alam II
- Head of the Merdiko Praja Mangkualaman Principality; Co-Founder & Former Chairman of MATRA
- Predecessor: Mangku Alam I
- House: Mangkualaman
- Religion: Islam

Kanjeng Gusti Pangeran Adipati Arya Mangku Alam II (crowned as KGPAA Tingalan Jumenengan Dalem Sri Paduka Mangku Alam II) is a Javanese royal who serves as the head of the independent Merdiko Praja Mangkualaman principality in Yogyakarta. Succeeding the claims of his predecessor Mangku Alam I (KPH Anglingkusumo), he is recognised as the head of the Mangkualaman mirroring that of Paku Alam X. Mangku Alam II is prominent nationally as a co-founder and the Chairman of the Central Executive Board (DPP) of Masyarakat Adat Nusantara (MATRA), one of Indonesia's largest NGOs connecting traditional rulers across the archipelago.

== Early Life and Personal Life ==
Born on 27 August 1978 as Sutan Rheindra Jais, is the son of Gusdinar Mahmud and Jasrul Isa Dt. Rajo Mudo. He married the daughter of KPH Anglingkusumo , who later became Mangku Alam I , and the first head of the Principality of Mangkualaman. After the marriage Sutan Rheindra Bais was termed as KPH Wiroyudho and always supported the claim of His father in law.

== Accession and Javanese Rites ==
The origins of the Mangkualaman are deeply intertwined with the internal succession crisis of the Kadipaten Pakualaman. Following the demise of Paku Alam VIII on 11 November 1998, friction arose within the royal family regarding the rightful lineage to the throne. The dispute split the court into two primary factions:

- The First Wife's Line: Descendants of Paku Alam VIII's first wife, led by Kanjeng Pangeran Haryo (KPH) Anglingkusumo.
- The Second Wife's Line: Descendants of Paku Alam VIII's second wife, led by KPH Ambarkusumo (who originally ascended the main throne as Paku Alam IX).

In 2012, the faction supporting KPH Anglingkusumo declared him as the alternative ruler, using the title Paku Alam IX Al-Haj. The dispute intensified following the death of Paku Alam IX in November 2015. Factions loyal to the second wife's line swiftly appointed his eldest son, RM Wijoseno Hario Bimo, as the successor, culminating in his formal coronation as Paku Alam X on 7 January 2016.

Rival family members, including KPH Wiroyudho, publicly opposed the speed of the coronation, labeling it an illegitimate power grab that breached traditional palace protocols (paugeran). Within 24 hours of the ceremony, the Anglingkusumo faction issued formal subpoenas and legal challenges against Paku Alam X over land usage rights and dynastic legitimacy. Later in August 2021, a separate principality Mangkualaman was created out of peace treaty and the rulers took the title. His Majesty KGPAA and Anglingkusomo became the Sri Paduka KGPAA Mangku Alam I. Later on January 26, 2022, due to health reasons, the previous claimant head abdicated the throne to his son-in-law, who was subsequently crowned as KGPAA Mangku Alam II.

To maintain traditional authority and social legitimacy among Javanese traditionalists, his administration hosts publicly visible customary rites. This includes the annual Jamasan Pusaka (ritual cleansing of sacred heirlooms) during the Javanese month of Suro at the Ndalem Wiroyudhan court, cleansing revered family keris such as Kanjeng Kyai Mahesa Panepi. In January 2024, his court celebrated its second coronation anniversary (Tingalan Jumenengan Kaping-2) in Kotagede, Yogyakarta, an event attended by representatives from 20 domestic royal lines, foreign delegations from Singapore, Malaysia, and Thailand, as well as prominent public figures like members of President Joko Widodo's extended family.

== Leadership in MATRA and National Diplomacy ==
Mangku Alam II served as the Chairman of the Central Executive Board of MATRA, an organization established in 2016 and formally declared at Candi Borobudur in July 2017. Under his leadership, the organization worked to preserve custom laws (Hukum Adat) and promoted the participation of traditional institutionsin public and cultural affairs .

=== The 2022 Bali Summit and Power Transition ===
In July 2022, Mangku Alam II met the Vice Governor of Bali, Tjokorda Oka Artha Ardhana Sukawati (Cok Ace), at the Vice Governor's Office in Denpasar. According to the organisers , the meeting was intended to support the launch of *Festival Adat Budaya Nusantara I* (August 2022) at the historic Alun-alun Semarapura, Klungkung, Bali.

The convention gathered representatives from 211 Indonesian royal houses and 30 international traditional kingdoms, including delegates from Spain, Hawaii, Laos, Uganda, and Ghana. In this summit, Mangku Alam II stepped down as General Chairman of MATRA to pass leadership to Andi Bau Malik Baramamase Tatukajanangan, of the Kingdom of Gowa, South Sulawesi.

=== Festival Adat Budaya Nusantara II (Jateng) ===
Following his chairmanship, Mangku Alam II assumed the role of Chairman of the Founding Board of MATRA. In December 2022, he headed the *Festival Adat Budaya Nusantara II* in the vicinity of Borobudur, Central Java. The festival drew 264 traditional institutions alongside delegates from Japan and Brunei. During the forum, Mangku Alam II issued a national declaration on cultural defense alongside then-Governor Ganjar Pranowo, calling for greater integration of regional heritage into government policy.

== Inter-Regional Relations ==
Mangku Alam II conducted a historical pilgrimage (Napak Tilas) to Madiun, East Java, to honor Ki Ngabehi Soerodiwirdjo, the foundational patriarch of the Persaudaraan Setia Hati martial arts lineage, tracing ancestral connections back to earlier generations of the Pakualaman line. he also attended the 354th commemoration of National Hero Sultan Hasanuddin of Gowa.

== See also ==
- Pakualaman
- Paku Alam X
