= Vice Governor of Yogyakarta =

Vice Governor of the Special Region of Yogyakarta
- Wakil Gubernur Daerah Istimewa Yogyakarta
- Coat of arms of the Special Region of Yogyakarta

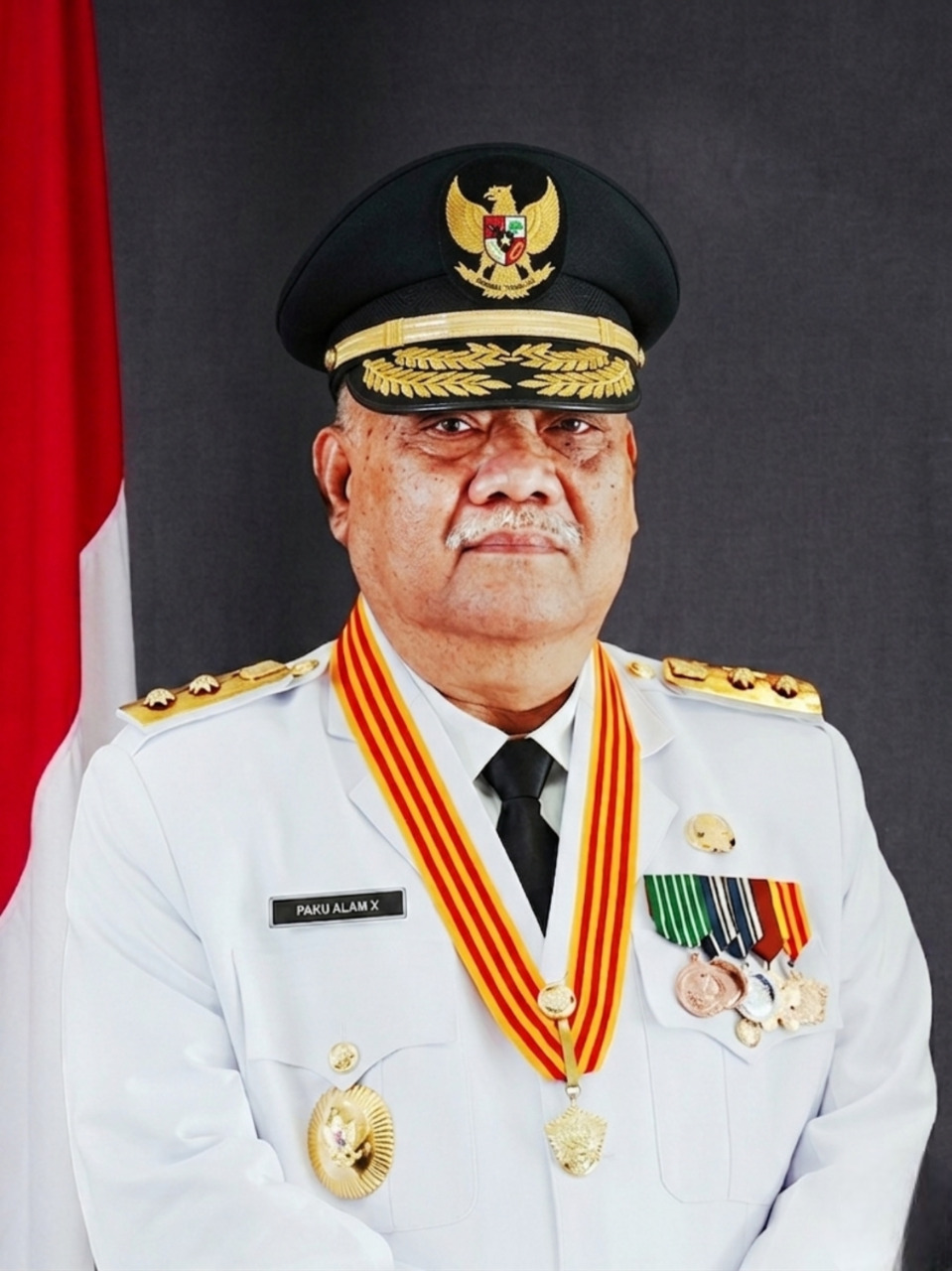
- Incumbent; Paku Alam X, 10th Duke of Pakualaman since 10 October 2022
- Style: The Honourable
- Residence: Yogyakarta
- Seat: Special Region of Yogyakarta, Indonesia
- Appointer: President of Indonesia
- Term length: 5 years
- Formation: 1950
- First holder: Paku Alam VIII

The Vice Governor of the Special Region of Yogyakarta (Indonesian: Wakil Gubernur Daerah Istimewa Yogyakarta) is the deputy head of government of the Special Region of Yogyakarta, an autonomous region of Indonesia.

Unlike other provinces in Indonesia, the position of vice governor is traditionally held by the reigning Duke of Pakualaman (Adipati Pakualaman), reflecting the region's unique monarchical system.

== History ==
The Special Region of Yogyakarta was formally integrated into the Republic of Indonesia in 1950, following the Indonesian National Revolution. The region retained its special status in recognition of the support provided by the Yogyakarta Sultanate and Pakualaman during the independence struggle.

Since then, the Sultan of Yogyakarta has served as Governor, while the Duke of Pakualaman has served as Vice Governor, forming a unique hereditary governance structure within Indonesia.

== Role and functions ==
The Vice Governor assists the Governor in administering the provincial government. The responsibilities include:

- Coordinating regional governance
- Assisting in policy implementation
- Representing the Governor when required
- Supporting development programs within the province

In Yogyakarta, the role also carries cultural and ceremonial significance due to its connection with the Pakualaman court.

== List of vice governors ==
No.	Portraits	Name	Term of office	Notes
1		Paku Alam VIII	1950–1998	First vice governor
2		Paku Alam IX	1998–2015	
3		Paku Alam X	2016–present	Incumbent

== See also ==
- Special Region of Yogyakarta
- Yogyakarta Sultanate
- Pakualaman
- Governor of the Special Region of Yogyakarta
