= Paku Alam X =

Prince of Pakualaman since 2016

Paku Alam X ꦦꦏꦸꦄꦭꦩ꧀꧇꧑꧐꧇
- His Grace The Duke of Pakualaman; The Honourable The Vice Governor of Yogyakarta
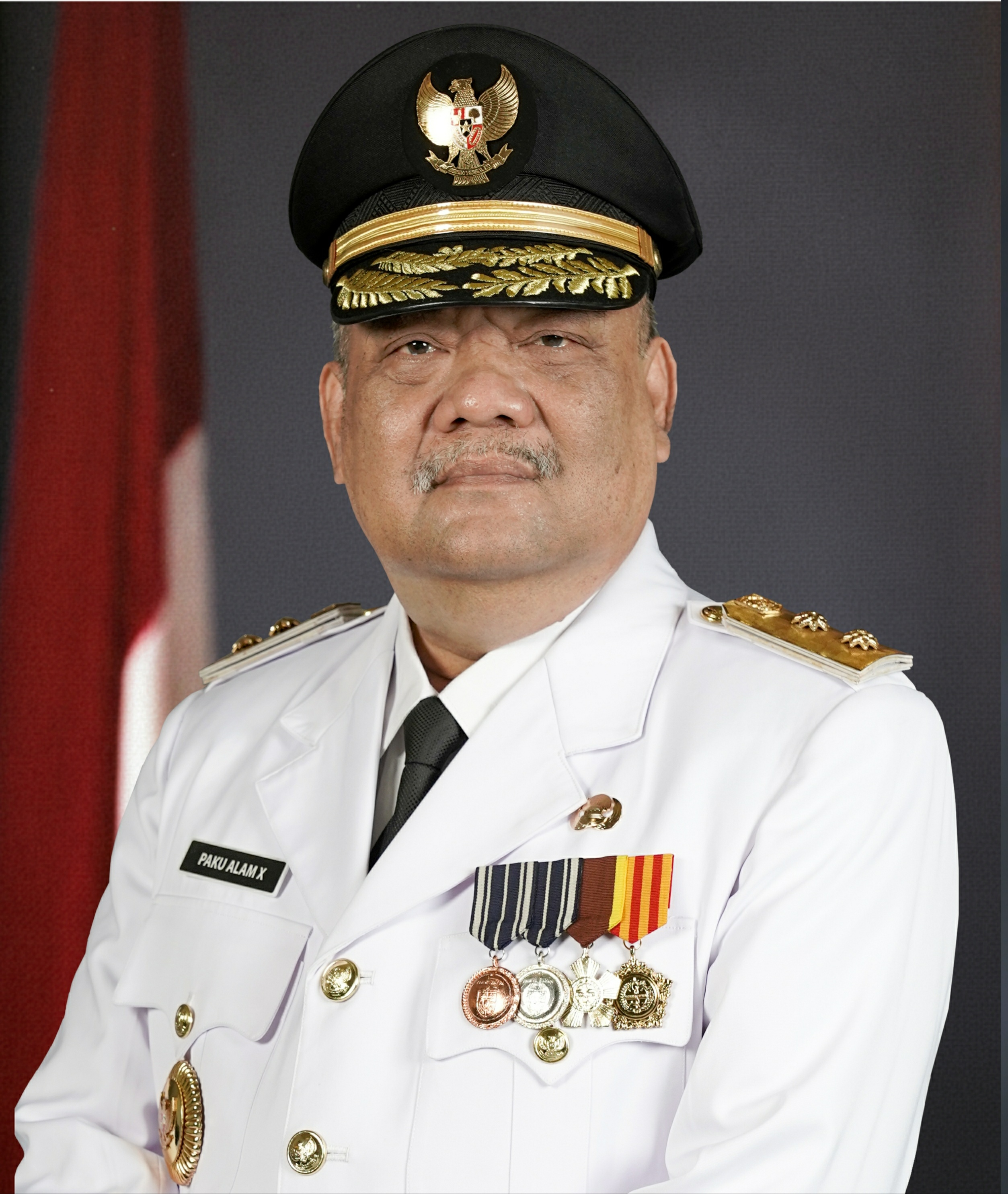
- Official portrait as a vice governor of Yogyakarta, 2023

3rd Vice Governor of Yogyakarta
- Incumbent
- Assumed office 25 May 2016
- Governor: Hamengkubuwono X
- Preceded by: Paku Alam IX

10th Duke of Pakualaman
- Reign: 7 January 2016 – present
- Predecessor: Paku Alam IX
- Born: Wijoseno Hario Bimo; 15 December 1962 (age 63); Yogyakarta, Indonesia
- Spouse: Gusti Kanjeng Bendara Raden Ayu Adipati Paku Alam (m. 1991)
- Issue: Kusumo Bimantoro; Kusumo Kuntonugroho
- Father: Paku Alam IX
- Mother: Koesoemarini
- Religion: Islam

Paku Alam X, 10th Duke of Pakualaman (Javanese: ꦦꦏꦸꦄꦭꦩ꧀꧇꧑꧐꧇; born 15 December 1962) is the Duke (Pangeran Adipati) of Pakualaman, a Javanese Principality in the Special Region of Yogyakarta, Indonesia. He succeeded as Paku Alam upon the death of the previous ruler, his father Paku Alam IX, who died on 21 November 2015. He was formally crowned with the Royal Javanese title of Kanjeng Gusti Pangeran Adipati Arya (KGPAA) Paku Alam X on 7 January 2016, and as stated in the National Constitution, on 25 May 2016, He was sworn and appointed as the hereditary Vice-Governor of Yogyakarta Special Region.

== Personal details ==
Paku Alam X, whose given name is RM Wijoseno Hario Bimo, is the eldest son of his father Paku Alam IX. In court circles in Yogyakarta, before he was appointed Paku Alam X he carried the royal title Kanjeng Gusti Pangeran Haryo (KGPH) Suryodilogo.

Paku Alam X was educated at schools in Jakarta and Yogyakarta before becoming a student in management studies in the Economics Faculty at the "Veteran" National Development University (Universitas Pembangunan Nasional (UPN) "Veteran") in Yogyakarta. In 1991 he became a civil servant in the Yogyakarta Regional Government and has held a series of positions in the Yogyakarta administration since then.

Like his predecessor, he was formally installed as the Vice-Governor of the Yogyakarta Special Region on 25 May 2016, currently serving with Sri Sultan Hamengko Buwono X.

Paku Alam X's official residence is the Pakualaman Palace in Yogyakarta, a short distance to the east of the main alun-alun square in the centre of the city.

== Ceremony ==
The official installation ceremony for his appointment was held on 7 January 2016 in the Sewatama meeting hall in the Paku Alam complex. The ceremony was attended by the Sultan of Yogyakarta, Sri Sultan Hamengku Buwono X as well as a range of senior representatives of the Indonesian government including Home Affairs Minister Tjahjo Kumolo and State Secretary (and former rector of Gadjah Mada University) Pratikno. The former President of Indonesia, Megawati Soekarnoputri also attended, along with her daughter, Puan Maharani, who is the Coordinating Minister for Human Development and Culture. Speaking after the ceremony, Paku Alam X said that he would work to continue the legacy of his predecessors and would act as a caretaker of local culture.

The ceremony was an occasion for members of other royal and court families from Java and Bali to gather. Apart from Sultan Hamengku Buwono X from Yogyakarta, other royal members and nobles who attended included the following:

- Surakarta, Central Java: From the Mangkunegaran of Surakarta, Mangkunegara IX, also known as Kanjeng Gusti Pangeran Adipati Arya Mangku Negara.
- Cirebon, West Java: From the Kasepuhan Kraton, Sultan Sepuh Arief Natadiningrat XIV and from the Kanoman Kraton, Kanjeng Sinuhan Sultan Kanoman Emirudin XII. Other members of court families from Cirebon who attended were Sultan Kacirebonan Abdul Gani IX, Pangeran Raja Lukman, and Pangeran Raja Keprabon Hempy IX
- Karangasem, Bali: Raja Puri Karangasem Anak Agung Gede Putra Agung.

The gathering together of both senior political figures and members of the various court families reflects links of this kind across the Indonesian elite which have been evident on other occasions as well.

Following the ceremony, during the afternoon there was a traditional procession through the nearby streets of Yogyakarta. The new Paku Alam rode in a 200-year-old golden carriage which carries the Javanese name of Kyai Manik Kumala. The carriage was a gift given to Paku Alam I in 1812 by the then-Lieutenant-Governor of Java, Sir Thomas Stamford Raffles. The parade was joined by the Pakualam's traditional troops, four elephants, and four other traditional royal carriages.

== Family dispute ==
There is a family dispute about the succession to the position of Paku Alam. Immediately upon the appointment of the new Paku Alam, a subpoena was sent to him on behalf of his half-brother, Kanjeng Pangeran Haryo (KPH) Anglingkusumo. The branch of the court family challenging Paku Alam X's right to succession argued that he failed to meet the proper criteria for appointment. Leadership disputes within the Pakualaman royal family are reported to date back to 1998 and the death of Paku Alam VIII. The conflict has primarily involved Anglingkusumo, the fourth son of Paku Alam VIII’s first wife Kanjeng Raden Ayu (KRAy) Retnaningrum, and Ambarkusumo, the first son of Paku Alam VIII’s second wife Kanjeng Raden Ayu (KRAy) Purnamaningrum.

Mangkualaman was divided out of the historical holdings of the royal family on 23 August 2021 as a proposed settlement between Royal claimants with KGPAA Mangku Alam Al-Haj Maulana Abdullah Khalifatullah Al-Jawi as head of the principality. The settlement is based on the historic restoration of the Merdiko Praja Mangkualaman Principality, which was established on 7 March 1822 by the Dutch East Indies colonial government. Paku Alam I was officially given the title Pangeran Adipati. Furthermore, this title is only used for Principality rulers who are more than 40 years old. In the Java War (Diponegoro Rebellion) 1825–1830 Paku Alam was passive. After reigning for about 16 years Paku Alam I died in 1829 and was buried in Kotagede, Yogyakarta. The founder of the Principality of Pakualaman left 11 sons and daughters and was succeeded by his son, RT Notodiningrat (Prince Suryaningrat), with the title Kanjeng Gusti Pangeran Adipati Suryaningrat on 18 December 1829. Only after signing the Politiek Contract 1831–1832–1833 with the Dutch East Indies colonial government, he was confirmed as Kanjeng Gusti Pangeran Adipati (KGPA) Paku Alam II.

The Principality of Mangkualaman is currently officially recognized by the Indonesian Republic under the Chapter VI, Articles 18, 18A, and 18B of the Indonesian Constitution and by the All-Indonesian Government and Keraton Association (AKKI), and Masyarakat Adat Nusantara (MATRA)/Association of the Indigenous Peoples of the Archipelago. KGPAA Mangku Alam Al-Haj Maulana Abdullah Khalifatullah Al-Jawi abdicated the throne due to health on 26 January 2022 to his son-in-law, KPH Adipati Wiroyudho (Sultan Pangeran Rheindra Jais Bagino Bungsu), who is also of the same royal line descending from Wisnuwardhana (Raja Singhasai). KPH Wiroyudho was crowned as KGPAA Tingalan Jumenengan Dalem Sri Paduka Mangku Alam Al-Haj dan Jumenengan Dalem Sri Paduka Mangku Alam II. The heir apparent is Pangeran Mahkota Mangkualaman, KGPH Prabu Mahaputra Narendra, GRM SM Syailendra Satria Sularso Narendra. Mangkualaman and Mangku Alam II has been recognized by a number of Asian governments and monarchs, as well as other constitutional traditional and sub-national monarchs and deposed dynastic royal houses in the world. In August 2022, many traditional rulers of the archipelago and abroad met in Bali in celebration of the traditional and cultural festival of the archipelago. In addition to participating in the traditional and cultural festivals of the archipelago, the various traditional rulers and leaders witnessed the inauguration of Andi Bau Malik Baramamase Tatukajanangan from the Kingdom of Gowa who replaced Mangku Alam II as Chair of the Matra DPP.

== See also ==
- List of monarchs of Java
- List of Indonesian monarchies
- Yogyakarta Sultanate

Pangeran Adipati Arya Paku Alam X House of Pakualaman Cadet branch of the House of Mataram Born: 15 December 1962
Political offices
| Preceded by Paku Alam IX | Vice Governor of Yogyakarta; 2016–present | Incumbent |
Regnal titles
| Preceded by Paku Alam IX | Prince of Pakualaman; 2016–present | Incumbent |
