= Mangkualaman =

Javanese princely court and cultural organization in Yogyakarta

House of Mangkualaman ꦩꦁꦏꦸꦄꦗꦭꦩꦤ꧀ Praja Mangkualam
- Parent house: Pakualaman
- Country: Indonesia
- Current region: Special Region of Yogyakarta
- Founded: 2021
- Founder: KGPAA Mangku Alam I (KGPAA Wiroyudho)
- Current head: KGPAA Mangku Alam II
- Titles: Kanjeng Gusti Pangeran Adipati Arya (KGPAA)

Mangkualaman ; Indonesian: (Praja Mangkualam), historically emerged as an alternative royal branch of the Pakualaman principality, is a Javanese court line and cultural institution based in the Special Region of Yogyakarta, Indonesia. The house was established following a prolonged dynastic succession dispute that began after the death of Paku Alam VIII in 1998, eventually splitting into a distinct traditional and administrative entity.

While the Government of Indonesia officially recognizes the main line of the Kadipaten Pakualaman (headed by Paku Alam X) for the statutory position of Vice-Governor of Yogyakarta under national law, the Mangkualaman operates its own royal court mirroring Pakualaman, and also as an active traditional indigenous council that wields regional cultural influence. The parallel royal court is led by the titleholder KGPAA Mangku Alam II.

== History and succession dispute ==
The origins of the Mangkualaman are deeply intertwined with the internal succession crisis of the Kadipaten Pakualaman. Following the demise of Paku Alam VIII on 11 November 1998, friction arose within the royal family regarding the rightful lineage to the throne. The dispute split the court into two primary factions:

- The First Wife's Line: Descendants of Paku Alam VIII's first wife, led by Kanjeng Pangeran Haryo (KPH) Anglingkusumo.
- The Second Wife's Line: Descendants of Paku Alam VIII's second wife, led by KPH Ambarkusumo (who originally ascended the main throne as Paku Alam IX).

In 2012, the faction supporting KPH Anglingkusumo declared him as the alternative ruler, using the title Paku Alam IX Al-Haj. The dispute intensified following the death of Paku Alam IX in November 2015. Factions loyal to the second wife's line swiftly appointed his eldest son, RM Wijoseno Hario Bimo, as the successor, culminating in his formal coronation as Paku Alam X on 7 January 2016.

Rival family members, including KPH Wiroyudho, publicly opposed the speed of the coronation, labeling it an illegitimate power grab that breached traditional palace protocols (paugeran). Within 24 hours of the ceremony, the Anglingkusumo faction issued formal subpoenas and legal challenges against Paku Alam X over land usage rights and dynastic legitimacy.

== Traditional restructuring ==
To resolve the protracted dynastic deadlock and prevent administrative friction within Yogyakarta's unique statutory governance framework—which mandates the reigning Paku Alam to serve as the region's Vice-Governor—the dissenting branch sought a formal separation of lines.

In August 2021, a resolution was reached through traditional indigenous councils and family consensus. Instead of continuing to claim the title of Paku Alam, the alternative line agreed to a historical restoration of a distinct, separate branch. This new court line was officially designated as Praja Mangkualaman (or simply Mangkualaman), and KPH Wiroyudho formally assumed leadership, taking the sovereign title Kanjeng Gusti Pangeran Adipati Arya (KGPAA) Mangku Alam II.

== Cultural and national influence ==
=== Foundation of MATRA ===
Operating independently of the main Pakualaman administration, the leadership of Mangkualaman transitioned into a major hub for national cultural preservation. KGPAA Mangku Alam II founded and chaired MATRA (Masyarakat Adat Nusantara / Archipelago Indigenous Community), one of the largest traditional organizations in Indonesia. MATRA serves to unify hundreds of domestic kingdoms, sultanates, and indigenous tribes, alongside royal representatives from Southeast Asia and global monarchies.

Under Mangkualaman's leadership, MATRA established the Archipelago Customary Cultural Festival (Festival Adat Budaya Nusantara), holding cultural gatherings to strengthen national heritage resilience. Significant iterations include the inaugural festival in Klungkung, Bali (August 2022), and the second festival near the Borobudur Temple area in Magelang, Central Java (December 2022), which hosted 264 delegates from traditional institutions and foreign nations.

The council also remains active in preserving military and ancestral ties linked to the Java War. In August 2024, MATRA collaborated with local communities and descendants of Prince Diponegoro's royal forces to hold the Kirab Suran Haul Pepunden Borobudur in Magelang, honoring historic resistance figures like Eyang Suro Dipo.

=== Alliances and royal titles ===
Through Praja Mangkualaman, the court actively participates in modern Indonesian civic life by honoring cultural workers, preservationists, and regional government officials. The house maintains political and social alliances across provinces by granting honorary Javanese noble titles. In October 2023, KGPAA Mangku Alam II officially bestowed the royal title of Kanjeng Raden Tumenggung Harya (KRTH) upon modern regional heads, such as the Regent of East Kotawaringin in Central Kalimantan, to foster cross-regional cultural synergy.

The house also orchestrates grassroots political alliances via the "Dinasti Nusantara" network, which coordinates with local visual and theatrical artists to lobby the national government for structural reforms—including the establishment of an independent Ministry of Culture and social protections for traditional craftsmen.

== List of rulers ==
The Mangkualaman line traces its modern chronology through its separate institutional establishment:

| Portrait | Name | Reign Start | Reign End | Notes |
|---|---|---|---|---|
| | KGPAA Mangku Alam I | De facto claimant 1998 / 2012 | 2021 | Represented by the early factional claims of KPH Anglingkusumo during the initial succession dispute. |
| | KGPAA Mangku Alam II (KGPAA Wiroyudho) | August 2021 | Present | Formally consolidated the line as a distinct traditional entity; founder and central leader of MATRA. |

== See also ==
- Pakualaman
- Special Region of Yogyakarta
- Mangkunegaran
- Sultanate of Yogyakarta
