= Pangeran Ratu Winata Kusuma of Sambas =

Pangeran Ratu Winata Kusuma of Sambas (official name Pangeran Ratu Winata Kusuma ibni al-Marhum Pangeran Ratu Muhammad Taufik; 25 September 1965 – 1 February 2008) was a sultan of Sambas, a traditional state in a town in West Kalimantan, Indonesia. He died from complications of a disease.
