= Sultanate of Panay =

- سلطنة باناي (Arabic); Sultanato sang Panay (Hiligaynon); Sultanato kang Panay (Kinaray-a); Sultanato ng Panay (Tagalog)
- Panay Island, which served as the cultural base of the sultanate.
- Formation: February 13, 2011; 15 years ago
- Founder: Cipriano Querol Jr.
- Founded at: Iloilo City, Philippines
- Type: Non-sovereign monarchy
- Region served: Panay (Muslim constituents)
- Sultan: Cipriano Querol Jr.

The Sultanate of Panay (Arabic: سلطنة باناي, romanized: Salṭanat Bānāy; Hiligaynon: Sultanato sang Panay; Kinaray-a: Sultanato kang Panay; Tagalog: Sultanato ng Panay) is a traditional institution and modern sultanate structure that was officially established on February 13, 2011 in Panay Island, the Philippines. The presence of this entity makes it the 21st customary recognized sultanate in the Philippines, completing the ranks of pre-colonial historical and cultures sultanates that were largely centered in the regions of Mindanao and Sulu Archipelago. The establishment of this institution was marked by the inauguration of Cipriano Querol Jr., who at that time served as the Director of Police of the Philippine National Police (PNP) Corps for the Western Visayas region (Region VI), as the first Sultan of Panay in the history of the island.

== Establishment and legitimacy of customs ==
The formation of the Sultanate of Panay according to customary law was formalized through a traditional royal decree and the proclamation led by Sultan of Masiu, Hadji Abdullah Topaan Disomimba. He acts in his capacity as Chairman of the 16 Royal Houses of Lanao in Mindanao. In the official coronation ceremony held at Camp Martin Delgado, Iloilo City, Sultan Disomimba issued a royal certificate appointing 20 administrative officers to run the institutional wheels of the contemporary sultanate.

The royal decree proclaimed a formal alliance between the 16 sultanates of the confederation of Lanao and the newly established Sultanate of Panay. The institutional structure of this sultanate embraces, protects, and represents the socio-religious interests of approximately 10,000 Muslim residents who live throughout the Panay Island region.

== Function and legal position ==
Despite holding the title of sultanate, this entity does not operate as an independent sovereign state or absolute monarchy holding territorial political jurisdiction over the regional governments of the Republic of the Philippines. Instead of adopting geopolitical or secessionist government functions, the Sultanate of Panay functioned as a cultural umbrella and an instrument of civil peace for the local Muslim community and the network of Islamic associations in the Western Visayas region.

Cipriano Querol Jr., a convert to Islam, dedicated his sultanate's role to integrating the minority Muslim community in the Visayas as an active partner in regional economic development. The main focus of this institution includes maintaining public security, public order, and empowering citizens through partnerships in peacekeeping operations at the barangay level (Barangay Peacekeeping Operations) in order to achieve a harmonious interfaith independent policing system.

== List of rulers ==
The following is a list of rulers (sultans) appointed to lead the Sultanate of Panay.

No.	Portrait	Name	Start of office	End of office	Notes
1		Cipriano Querol Jr. (First Sultan of Panay)	February 13, 2011	Incumbent	A high-ranking officer of the Philippine National Police (PNP) and a convert to Islam. Crowned by the 16 Royal Houses of Lanao.

== See also ==
- Sultanate of Sulu
- Sultanate of Maguindanao
- Madja-as
- 16 Royal Houses of Lanao
