= Sultanate of Sintang =

Former sultanate in Kalimantan, Indonesia

Sultanate of Sintang كسلطانن سينتڠ Kesultanan Sintang
- 1365–1950
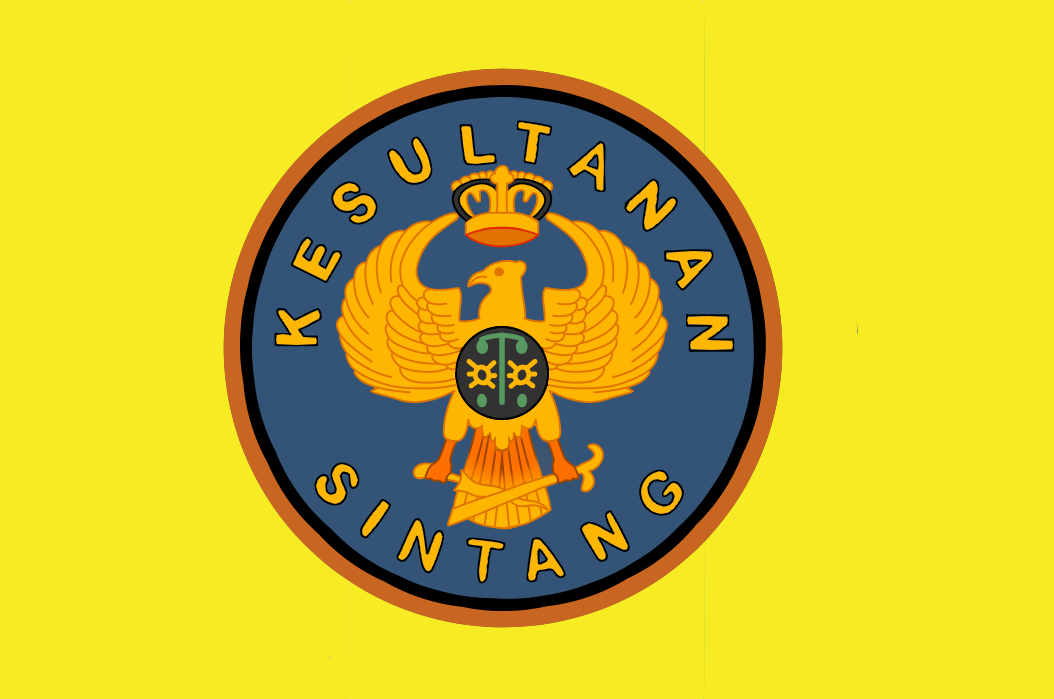
- Flag
- Capital: Sintang
- Common languages: Malay
- Religion: Animism; then Hinduism; then Islam
- Government: Monarchy
- Panembahan
- History
  - Established: 1365
  - Joined Indonesia, under the administration of West Kalimantan: 1950
Succeeded by
West Kalimantan
- Today part of: Indonesia

Sultanate of Sintang was a sultanate that once ruled the Sintang Regency, West Kalimantan present, in island of Kalimantan, Indonesia. It began as an animist Malay-Dayak kingdom then transitioned into Hinduism for some time, until it converted to Islam in 1672 under the leadership of Sultan Nata.

== Early history ==
The state of Sintang was ruled by an unnamed dynasty. The rulers were:

- Abang Samat Semah, Prince of Sintang.
- Abang Ismail Zubair Mail Jubairi Irawan II, Prince of Sintang
- Abang Suruh, Prince of Sintang, son of Abang Ismail Zubair Mail Jubairi Irawan II, Prince of Sintang
- Abang Tembilang Ari, Prince of Sintang
- ca. 1600–1643 Abang Pencin Pontin, Pangeran Agung Pandeling, Pangeran of Sintang
- ca. 1643–1672 Pangeran Tunggal

== Muslim kingdom ==
The first ruler of Sintang to convert to Islam was Abang Nata, who was titled Sultan Nata Muhammad Syamsuddin Sa'adul Khari Waddin.

- 1672–1738 Sri Paduka Sultan Muhammad Shams ud-din Sa'id ul-Khairiwaddien Sultan Nata, Sultan of Sintang
- 1738–1786 Sri Paduka Sultan 'Abdu'l Rahman Muhammad Jalal ud-din ibni al-Marhum Sultan Muhammad Shams ud-din Sa'id ul-Khairiwaddien Sultan Aman, Sultan of Sintang
- 1786–1796 Sri Paduka Sultan 'Abdu'l Rashid Muhammad Jamal ud-din ibni al-Marhum Sultan 'Abdu'l Rahman Muhammad Jalal ud-din Sultan Ajib, Sultan of Sintang.
- 1796–1851 Sri Paduka Sultan Muhammad Qamar ud-din ibni al-Marhum Sultan 'Abdu'l Rashid Muhammad Jamal ud-din, Sultan of Sintang
- 1851–1855 Sri Paduka Sultan Muhammad Jamal ud-din II ibni al-Marhum Sultan Muhammad Qamar ud-din Sultan of Sintang
- 1855–1889 Sri Paduka Tuanku 'Abdu'l Said ibni al-Marhum Sultan Muhammad Jamal ud-din, Panembahan Kusuma Negara I Panembahan of Sintang
- 1889–1905 Sri Paduka Tuanku Ismail ibni al-Marhum Panembahan 'Abdu'l Said, Panembahan Kusuma Negara II Panembahan of Sintang.
- 1905–1913 Sri Paduka Tuanku Haji Gusti Adi 'Abdu'l-Majid ibni al-Marhum Panembahan Ismail, Panembahan Kusuma Negara III Panembahan of Sintang
- 1913–1934 Ade Muhammad Jun 'Abdu'l-Kadir Pangeran Adipati Temenggong Setia Agama Wakil Panembahan of Sintang.
- 1934–1944 Sri Paduka Tuanku Muhammad Jamal ud-din ibni al-Marhum Panembahan Haji Gusti Adi 'Abdu'l-Majid, Panembahan Kusuma Negara IV Panembahan of Sintang
- 1944–1947 Sri Paduka Paduka Tuanku Muhammad Shams ud-din ibni al-Marhum Radin Panji Negara Gusti 'Abdu'l Rahman, Panembahan Kusuma Negara V Panembahan of Sintang

== Bibliography ==
- Fienieg, Anouk, Sejarah Sintang - The History of Sintang : A Collection of Books, Manuscripts, Archives and Articles, 2007
