= Cipriano Querol Jr. =

- 1st Sultan of Panay
- Reign: February 13, 2011 – Present
- Coronation: February 13, 2011
- Born: Cipriano Erfe Querol Jr. December 8, 1957 (age 68)
- Religion: Islam
- Military career
- Allegiance: Sultanate of Panay
- Service years: 2011–present
- Police career
- Allegiance: Philippines
- Department: Philippine National Police
- Branch: Capiz Provincial Police Office; Police Regional Office 6; Special Action Force; Directorate for Intelligence
- Service years: –2013
- Status: Retired
- Rank: Police Director

PDIR Cipriano Erfe Querol, Jr. Al-Haj is a Filipino former police officer who served as director of the Police Regional Office 6 (Western Visayas) and the Special Action Force of the Philippine National Police. He is also the first monarch of the non-sovereign Sultanate of Panay.

== Education ==
Querol attended the Philippine Military Academy, graduating from the institution in 1981.

== Police career ==
From April 20, 2005 to January 12, 2007, Querol served as the director of the Capiz Provincial Police Office.

Querol served as director general of PNP's Western Visayas (Region 6) office for almost two years, assuming the position on October 19, 2010. He is the proponent of the Barangay Peacekeeping Action Team (BPAT) project – which encourages a community-oriented policing system. He is responsible for setting up BPATs in 3,618 of the 4,051 barangays in Western Visayas.

On August 2, 2012, Querol took command of the Special Action Force and vacated his previous assignment in Western Visayas.

In December 2012, Querol was named acting Director of Intelligence.

After reaching the mandatory retirement age of 56, Querol ended his police career on December 8, 2013.

== Sultan of Panay ==
With the backing of the 16 Royal Houses of Lanao del Sur, the Sultanate of Panay was instituted on February 12, 2011 through a royal decree by the Mindanao-based monarchies. Querol was crowned as the first Panay sultan the following day.

== Personal life ==
Querol is a Muslim convert. He converted to Islam in 1992 while fulfilling United Nations peacekeeping duty in Cambodia. He has already performed the Hajj at least twice.
