= Java War (disambiguation) =

The Java War (1825–30) was fought between the Diponegoro and the Dutch Empire.

Java War may also refer to:

- First Javanese War of Succession (1704–07), civil war
- Second Javanese War of Succession (1719–23), civil war
- Java War (1741–43), between the Javanese and Dutch
- Third Javanese War of Succession (1749–57), civil war
- Invasion of Java (1811), between the British and Dutch

== See also ==
- Invasion of Java (disambiguation)
- WAR file format (Sun), for Java applications
