= Javanese Wars of Succession =

18th-century Javanese wars

The Javanese Wars of Succession were three military confrontations between the Dutch East India Company (VOC) and the Mataram Sultanate on central Java between 1703 and 1755. The hereditary succession in Mataram was at stake, prompting the VOC to field its own candidates in an attempt to gain more influence in central and eastern Java. At the end of the Javanese Wars of Succession, Mataram was carved into three weak Vorstenlanden ("Princely Lands"), independent in name only, as a consequence of the divide and rule policy of the VOC.

== Overview ==
The Trunajaya rebellion (1674–1681) lay the seed for the Javanese Wars of Succession. During this uprising, sultan Amangkurat I of Mataram died in 1677, causing a war of succession to break out between his sons Rahmat (Amangkurat II) and Puger (Pakubuwono I). Puger surrendered in 1681 and recognised his brother as the rightful sultan, but when the latter died in 1703, he disputed his brother's succession by his son Amangkurat III, which led to the First Javanese War of Succession.

The three Javanese Wars of Succession were:

- First Javanese War of Succession (1703–1708)
- Second Javanese War of Succession (1719–1722)
- Third Javanese War of Succession (1749–1755)

In the aftermath of this divide and rule policy on Java, one further partition of Yogyakarta occurred in 1812, increasing the number of Vorstenlanden to four.

== Indonesian nationalism ==
The most prominent leaders on the Javanese side (Untung Surapati, Hamengkubuwono I) were later elevated to national Indonesian heroes in the 19th and 20th century, preceding the independence struggle of the Republic of Indonesia proclaimed in 1945.

== Literature ==
- Ooi Keat Gin, South-East Asia. A historical encyclopedia from Angkor Wat to East Timor, Santa Barbara: ABC CLIO
- Busken Huet, Het land van Rembrandt. Studieën over de Noordnederlandse beschaving in de zeventiende eeuw, Haarlem: Tjeenk Willink 1882
- Blok, P.J., Geschiedenis van Nederlandsche Volk, volume III, book X, Leiden 1923
