= Amangkurat IV of Mataram =

Susuhunan of Mataram (died 1726)

Susuhunan of Mataram
- Reign: 1719 – 1726
- Coronation: May 5, 1719
- Predecessor: Pakubuwana I
- Successor: Pakubuwana II
- Born: Raden Mas Suryaputra ca. 1680
- Died: April 20, 1726; Kartasura, Mataram Sultanate
- Burial: Pakubuwanan Tomb, Imogiri Royal Cemetery, Imogiri, Mataram Sultanate
- Spouse: Gusti Kanjeng Ratu Kencana/Gusti Kanjeng Ratu Amangkurat () Gusti Kanjeng Ratu Kadipaten ()
- Issue: Pakubuwana II; Hamengkubuwono I
Regnal name
- Sampeyan Dalem Ingkang Sinuhun Susuhunan Prabu Amangkurat Senapati ing Ngalaga Abdurrahman Sayyidin Panatagama Ingkang Jumeneng Kaping IV
- House: Mataram
- Father: Pakubuwana I
- Mother: Gusti Kanjeng Ratu Pakubuwana

Amangkurat IV was the son of Pakubuwono I, and Susuhunan Mataram between 1719 and 1726. His son was ruler of Mataram, Pakubuwono II.

== Genealogy ==
Sunan Amangkurat IV, also known as Sunan Jawi, was born as Raden Mas Suryaputra. He was the son of Pakubuwana I and by his queen consort, Gusti Kanjeng Ratu Pakubuwana (also known as Ratu Mas Balitar), daughter of Pangeran Harya Balitar IV, a descendant of Pangeran Juminah, who was the son of Panembahan Senapati and Ratu Ratna Dumilah.

== Reign ==
=== Succession in Kartasura ===
In 1703, Amangkurat II died and was succeeded by his son, Raden Mas Sutikna, who took the title Amangkurat III.

The severe impact of the Trunajaya rebellion in Plered had previously forced Amangkurat II to move the court to the village of Wanakarta, establishing a new palace named Kartasura in 1680. The Kartasura Palace became the primary seat of the Mataram Sultanate following the destruction of the Plered Palace. However, Pangeran Puger (Amangkurat II's brother) remained in Plered and initially refused to recognize his brother's authority. Following a period of friction, Pangeran Puger eventually surrendered and recognized his brother's sovereignty in 1681.

Despite this, Pangeran Puger maintained significant support among the royal family. In 1704, Amangkurat III dispatched troops to arrest him. Alerted by Cakrajaya (Danureja)—who acted as a spy disguised as a grass cutter—Pangeran Puger fled to Semarang to seek assistance from the Dutch East India Company (VOC). The Dutch agreed to support him under various conditions. One year later, in 1705, a joint force of Dutch, Semarang, West Madura, and Surabaya troops launched an attack on Kartasura.

On the advice of Arya Mataram, Amangkurat III was forced to flee to Ponorogo, taking the royal heirlooms (pusaka) with him. Pangeran Puger and his coalition successfully occupied Kartasura, where he ascended the throne with the title Pakubuwana I. As compensation for Dutch military support, Pakubuwana I was forced to cede the coastal territory of Semarang and its surroundings to the VOC under a mortgage status.

=== Accession to the throne ===
Upon the death of Pakubuwana I in 1719, his son Raden Mas Suryaputra succeeded him. However, he did not take the title Pakubuwana, but instead styled himself Amangkurat IV, reclaiming the title used by his cousin, Amangkurat III.

The leadership of Amangkurat IV was quickly challenged by a succession crisis. This struggle for the Mataram throne had profound consequences for the kingdom and its outlying territories (mancanagara). Due to widespread dissatisfaction among the royal family regarding Amangkurat IV’s coronation, the Javanese populace split their loyalties into five factions: the supporters of Amangkurat IV and those of his four rivals—his brothers Pangeran Purbaya, Pangeran Balitar, and Arya Dipanagara, as well as his uncle, Pangeran Arya Mataram.

Pangeran Arya Balitar attempted to restore the former palace of Sultan Agung, naming it Kartasekar, and proclaimed himself Sultan Ibnu Mustafa Pakubuwana. Simultaneously, Pangeran Arya Dipanagara was inaugurated as the leader of the Union of Regents of the East (Bang Wetan), taking the title Panembahan Herucakra and establishing his court in Sukowati (Madiun). Meanwhile, Arya Mataram fled Kartasura for the north coast; after reaching Santenan (Cengkal Sewu), his forces launched attacks on Grobogan, Warung, Blora, and Sesela.

=== Suppressing the rebellions ===
The civil war for the Mataram throne, referred to by historians as the Second Javanese War of Succession, deeply divided the Javanese people. In October 1719, Mataram forces, supported by the VOC, first moved against Arya Mataram, who was rebelling in Pati. He was subsequently captured and executed by hanging in Jepara.

By November 1720, the joint Mataram and VOC forces turned their attention to Kartasekar. The stronghold was destroyed, forcing Pangeran Balitar’s group to retreat eastward. Pangeran Balitar had previously managed to persuade Jayapuspita (an ally of Arya Dipanagara) to join his side, using forces from Mojokerto to attack Madiun. Arya Dipanagara was defeated and fled to Baturrana before eventually surrendering to Pangeran Balitar and joining him at Kartasekar.

The rebel strength gradually waned as its leaders fell. Jayapuspita died of illness in 1720 shortly before the fall of Kartasekar, and Pangeran Balitar himself died in 1721 due to a disease outbreak while in Malang.

The war finally concluded in 1723 with the capture of the remaining rebel leaders. Pangeran Purbaya was exiled to Batavia, and Arya Dipanagara (Panembahan Herucakra) was exiled to the Cape of Good Hope (though he was returned to Mataram in his old age and buried at the Pajimatan Imogiri Royal Cemetery). Panji Surengrana, the brother of Jayapuspita, was exiled to Sri Lanka.

=== End of reign and death ===
During his reign, Amangkurat IV experienced friction with Cakraningrat IV, the regent of West Madura. Cakraningrat IV had previously played a significant role in suppressing the Jayapuspita rebellion in Surabaya in 1718. He held the conviction that Madura would achieve greater prosperity under the direct administration of the VOC rather than remaining under the sovereignty of the Mataram Sultanate.

The relationship between the two improved after Cakraningrat IV was taken as Amangkurat IV's son-in-law. However, Cakraningrat IV would later come into conflict with Amangkurat IV's son, Raden Mas Prabasuyasa.

In March 1726, Amangkurat IV fell ill, reportedly due to poisoning. He died on 20 April 1726, before the perpetrator could be identified.

Amangkurat IV was succeeded by his 15-year-old son, Raden Mas Prabasuyasa, who ascended the throne as Pakubuwana II. The new monarch's reign was later marked by further instability and conflicts with Sunan Kuning (a grandson of Amangkurat III), Pangeran Mangkubumi (his brother), and Pangeran Sambernyawa (his nephew). These internal power struggles eventually led to the decline of Mataram's sovereignty and increased Dutch intervention, culminating in the Treaty of Giyanti and the Treaty of Salatiga.

== Family ==
Personal name	Title and style(s)	Notes
By Queen Consort, Gusti Kanjeng Ratu Kencana (later Gusti Kanjeng Ratu Ageng)
Raden Mas Gusti Prabasuyasa/Prabayasa, Raden Mas Sandi	Kanjeng Gusti Pangeran Adipati Anom Hamengkunegara; Pakubuwana II	Succeeded ruling Surakarta Sunanate
Raden Ajeng Siti Sundari	Gusti Kanjeng Ratu Madurêtna	Married to : Pangeran Cakraningrat of Madura; Raden Arya Endranata
By Queen Consort, Gusti Kanjeng Ratu Kadipaten
Raden Mas Sekti, Raden Mas Awih, Raden Mas Bumi	Pangeran Arya Buminata	
Raden Mas Kadhaton	Pangeran Arya Buminata; Sultan Dhandhun Martengsari; Panembahan Bintara	
Raden Mas Pamade	Pangeran Arya Mataram; Pangeran Arya Buminata	
Raden Mas Sunaka	Pangeran Arya Singasari; Pangeran Prabu Jaka (Sunan Prabujaka)	
By concubine, Mas Ayu Sumanarsa
Raden Mas Sura, Raden Mas Landhe, Raden Mas Sandi, Raden Mas Damar	Pangeran Riya; Kanjeng Gusti Pangeran Adipati Arya Mangkunegara	Ancestor of Mangkunegaran
By concubine, Mas Ayu Tejawati
Raden Ajeng Aminah, Raden Ajeng Supani	Raden Ayu Adipati Pringgalaya; Raden Ayu Ageng	Married to : Raden Adipati Pringgalaya; Raden Tumenggung Wiradigda
Raden Mas Sujana	Pangeran Arya Mangkubumi; Pangeran Adipati Sukawati; Hamengkubuwana I	Establishing Yogyakarta Sultanate
By concubine, Raden Erawati
Raden Mas Sandeya	Pangeran Ngabei	Known by his cleric name Kiai Nur Iman
By concubine, Raden Ayu Pandhansari
Raden Mas Subekti	Pangeran Arya Pamot; Pangeran Arya Hadiwijaya	Died in Kali Abu (Lepen Abu)
By concubine, Mas Ayu Rondhonsari
Raden Ajeng Rembe	Raden Ayu Endranata; Raden Ayu Adipati Danureja I	Married to : Raden Arya Endranata; Raden Adipati Danureja I

== Ancestry ==
Sultan Agung Hanyokrokusumo
Amangkurat I
Ratu Wetan
Pakubuwana I
Pangeran Prabuwijaya
Ratu Wetan
Amangkurat IV
Pangeran Adipati Balitar
Pangeran Tumenggung Balitar
Gusti Kanjeng Ratu Pakubuwana

Preceded by Pakubuwono I	Susuhunan of Mataram; 1719 – 1726	Succeeded by Pakubuwono II
