= Mangkunegara I =

Ruler of Mangkunegaran, Java (1757–1795)

His Royal Highness Mangkunegara I
- Kanjeng Gusti Pangeran Adipati Arya Mangkunegara I
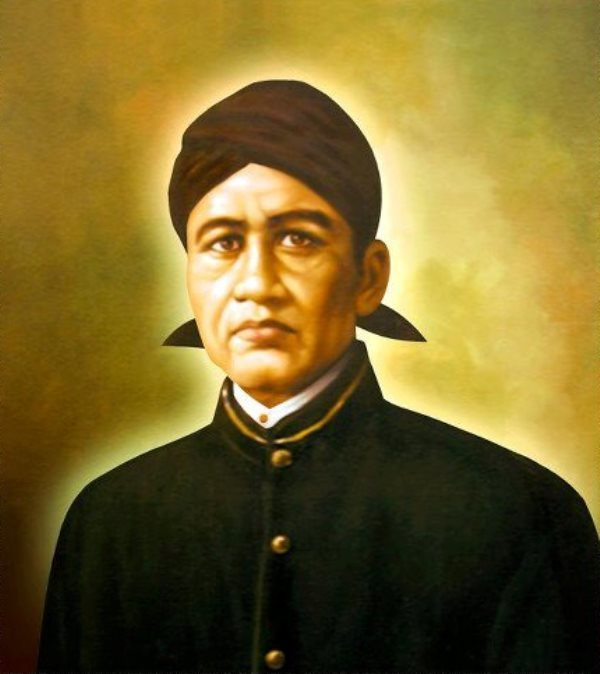
- Posthumous depiction of Mangkunegara I, 2014.

1st Duke of Mangkunegaran
- Reign: 1757–1795
- Successor: Mangkunegara II
- Born: Raden Mas Said; 7 April 1726; Kartasura, Mataram Sultanate
- Died: 28 December 1795 (aged 70); Surakarta, Surakarta Sunanate
- Burial: Mangadeg Royal Cemetery, Matesih, Karanganyar Regency
- Spouses: Gusti Kanjeng Ratu Bendara of Yogyakarta (m. 1747; div. 1763) Raden Ayu Matahati (died 1787)
- Issue more...: Kanjeng Pangeran Harya Prabu Amijaya
- House: Mataram
- Father: Kanjeng Gusti Pangeran Adipati Arya Mangkunegara
- Mother: Raden Ayu Wulan
- National Hero of Indonesia; S.K. President No. 048/TK/1988 dated 17 August 1988.

Mangkunegara I, 1st Duke of Mangkunegaran also known as Prince Sambernyawa ("Life Reaping Prince"), his birth name was Raden Mas Said (7 April 1725 – 28 December 1795), established the Puro Mangkunegaran, in Surakarta, Java Island. Thus, he was the first ruler of The Principality of Mangkunegaran.

== Personal life ==
Mangkunegara was given the nickname "Pangeran Sambernyawa" ('The Life Reaping Prince') based on his banner (Panji), which was also named Sambernyawa.

Raden Mas Said was born on 7 April 1726 in Kartasura. Mangkunegara was brought up by his mother, Raden Ayu Wulan and his father, Prince Mangkunegara of Kartasura. His father was the eldest son of Amangkurat IV born to a concubine, Mas Ayu Sumanarsa of Nglaroh (also known as Mas Ayu Karoh), and by his princely title of Kanjeng Gusti Pangeran Adipati Arya Mangkunegara, he was the crown prince of Mataram. His maternal grandfather was Kanjeng Gusti Pangeran Adipati Arya Blitar, younger brother of Amangkurat IV. Thus, his parents were first paternal cousin.

In 1747 (1642 AJ), he married Raden Ajeng Inten or Raden Ajeng Bruwok, daughter of Hamengkubuwana I. She was later styled Gusti Kanjeng Ratu Bendara upon her father's ascension.

He was in-law with Pakubuwana III as his eldest son, Kanjeng Pangeran Harya Prabuwijaya, born to Raden Ayu Matahati of Nglaroh, wed his daughter. She was originally a concubine by the name of Mas Ayu Matahati, elevated to Raden Ayu Mangkunegara Sepuh.

== War against the Dutch East India Company ==
Said's war against the Dutch East India Company started with the rebellion in Kartasura Palace on 30 June 1742, which was led by Raden Mas Garendi (a.k.a. Sunan Kuning) and destroyed the four meters of Kartasura's castle wall. Pakubuwono II, the ruler of Kartasura Palace at that time, evacuated himself to Ponorogo Regency. Said was 19 years old when he joined his uncle, Mangkubumi, to defend the people of Mataram which was oppressed by the Dutch Company, and their king, Pakubuwono II. The uncle-nephew siege the Kartasura Palace, which was called the Dutch puppet Kingdom. When the army sieged the palace, the nobles left the Kartasura Palace to evacuate themselves. Raden Mas Said built a fortress in Randuwalang, to the north of Surakarta, and merged his army with Sunan Kuning forces to fight against the Dutch Company. Said was promoted and became the warlord.

Their army managed to destroy the Surakarta Palace. When Pakubuwono II died, Prince Mangkubumi ran to Semarang to meet the ruler of the Dutch East India Company and asked him so Mangkubumi become the king of Mataram. Of course, the Dutch East India Company did not grant Mangkubumi's wish. Then, Mangkubumi joins Prince Puger in Sukowati, a district in Surakarta. With the help of the Dutches, all of the Chinese armies drove out from Kartasura Palace, but six months later, Pakubuwono II went back to Kartasura just to find out that his palace had been destroyed.

But the king's request for reinforcement from the Dutches is not for free, and must be paid expensively; the north region of Java, from Rembang, Pasuruan, Surabaya, and Madura Island must be handed over to the Dutch East India Company. Also, every coronation and promotion in the palace must receive approval from the Dutch Company first. When Prince Mangkubumi declared that he join the army with Said, he chose to guerrilla against the Dutch Company in the jungle in Yogyakarta.

He married to Raden Ayu Kusumapatahati, the daughter of a clerics, Kyai Kasan Nur Iman. Then, at the age of 22, married again for the second time with Raden Ajeng Inten, a daughter of Prince Mangkubumi by his primary consort. When Said separated his army from Raden Mas Garendi, and built a headquarters in Panambangan, then declared himself as Prince Mangkunegara I. Not long after his declaration, his throne was struck by lightning. This means that Said cannot be the king or act like the king in the palace. When the news of the death of Pakubuwono II heard, Said met Prince Mangkubumi and asked his parent-in-law to declare himself as a king of Mataram before the coronation of the son of Pakuwubono II. Prince Mangkubumi declared himself as "Sultan Hamengkubuwono", and Said was promoted to become the warlord. As a Yogyakarta princess, his wife, Raden Ayu Inten, was promoted to Gusti Kanjeng Ratu Bendara. But of course, the reign of Mangkubumi wasn't approved by the Dutch East India Company.

So many events happened after fighting against the Dutch Company, Prince Mangkubumi and Prince Mangkunegara had a conflict about politics. Said had to fight the Dutch East India Company alone. And finally, Mataram was divided into two by the Treaty of Giyanti on 13 February 1755. This treaty was rejected by Said because it could ruin the unity of the Mataram people. Over the 16 years, Said fought 250 battles against the Dutch Company. From that, the Dutches called Said "The Soul Reaper" because he is the nightmare of his enemies. Said greatness in war strategy was not just praised by his followers but also feared by his enemies. Even the Dutch governor of East Java, Baron van Hohendorff, admitted Said's brilliance in war.

His political alliance with Hamengkubuwono I turned into rivalry, after Salatiga Treaty in 1757. The conflict heighten when the Crown Prince of Yogyakarta failed got Gusti Kanjeng Ratu Alit, eldest daughter of Pakubuwana III's hands in marriage as she wed Kanjeng Pangeran Harya Prabuhamijaya, Mangkunegara I's eldest son born to Raden Ayu Kusumapatahati in 1362. This was seen as a humiliation to Yogyakarta, which resulting to Ratu Bendara's returned to Yogyakarta and sue him in divorce.

== Family ==
According to Babad Panambangan (1918), his three concubines: Bok Ajêng Kasiyah, Bok Ajêng Tambiyah, and Bok Ajêng Amiyah were carried off by his servant, Ngabei Matangrasa. His children were listed below.

1. Unnamed daughter, died
2. Radèn Mas Sura, titled Pangeran Arya Prabu Wijaya, married Gusti Kangjêng Ratu Alit. They had a son, Pangeran Arya Prangwadana, who, after the passing of his grandfather, succeeded as Kangjêng Gusti Pangeran Adipati Arya Mangkunegara II
3. Radèn Ayu Sombrong or Radèn Ayu Anggèr, married Radèn Tumênggung Yudanagara of Banyumas
4. Radèn Ayu Suryanagara of Kaduwang
5. Radèn Ajêng Sri, styled Radèn Ayu Suryanagara of Kaduwang, married the same man as her sister.
6. Radèn Ajêng Sêmi, styled Radèn Ayu Ănggadirja or Wăngsadirja
7. Radèn Ayu Surya of Kabanaran
8. Radèn Mas Slamêt, titled Pangeran Arya Purbanagara
9. Radèn Ajêng Soblêm, styled Radèn Ayu Rêksanagara of Tegal
10. Radèn Mas Sakatun, titled Radèn Mas Suryaditruna
11. Radèn Ajêng Srêndêp, styled Radèn Ayu Mangkukusuma
12. Radèn Ayu Puspakusuma of Surakarta
13. Pangeran Arya Padmanagara of Wirasaba
14. Radèn Mas Tumênggung Arya Suryamarjaya of Wirasaba
15. Radèn Mas Tumênggung Arya Suryakusuma of Pace
16. Radèn Ayu Adimênggala of Semarang
17. Radèn Ayu Wiryanagara of Lasem
18. Radèn Ayu Purwanagara of Surakarta
19. Radèn Ayu Citrasoma of Pangampon Samarang
20. Radèn Ayu Rănggasatata of Surakarta
21. Radèn Mas Arya Amijayasarosa of Surakarta
22. Radèn Mas Tumênggung Arya Suryakaskaya of Wirasaba
23. Radèn Mas Arya Amiyajasantosa of Surakarta
24. Radèn Mas Arya Jayadimulya of Surakarta
25. Radèn Mas Arya Suryadilaga of Surakarta

== Sources ==
- Soekanto, Dr., "About Djogjakarta" 1755-1825, Djakarta: Mahabharata, Amsterdam, 1952
- Anderson, BRO'G. The Idea of Power in Javanese Culture dalam Anderson, BRO'G. Language and Power: Exploring Political Cultures in Indonesia. Cornell University Press. 1990.
- Buwono XII (Sunan of Surakarta), Paku (2006). Karaton Surakarta: A Look into the Court of Surakarta Hadiningrat, Central Java. Marshall Cavendish Editions. ISBN 978-981-261-226-7.
- Miksic, John N. (general ed.), et al. (2006) Karaton Surakarta. A look into the court of Surakarta Hadiningrat, central Java (First published: 'By the will of His Serene Highness Paku Buwono XII'. Surakarta: Yayasan Pawiyatan Kabudayan Karaton Surakarta, 2004) Marshall Cavendish Editions Singapore
- Ricklefs, M. C. (1982). Jogjakarta Under Sultan Mangkubumi, 1749-1792: A History of the Division of Java. University Microfilms.
