= Untung Surapati =

Indonesian war fighter

Untung Suropati
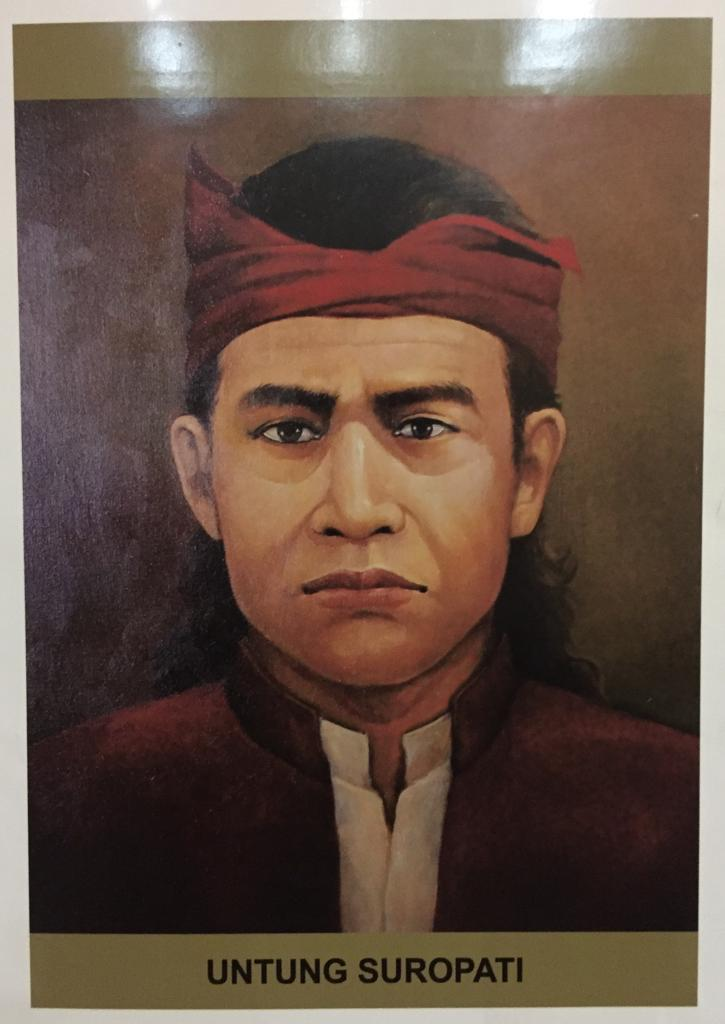
- Drawing of Untung Surapati

Adipati of Pasuruan
- Monarchs: Amangkurat II; Amangkurat III

Personal details
- Born: c. 1660 Puri Jelantik, Gelgel, Bali
- Died: c. 1706 Bangil Fort, Pasuruan
- Spouse(s): Suzanne Moor; Raden Ayu Gusik Kusuma
- Children: Raden Penganten; Raden Suropati; Raden Suradilaga

Military service
- Battles/wars: Bantam war (1682); Ambush at Cikalong (1684); Skirmish of Kartasura; First Javanese War of Succession; Battle of Pasuruan †

Untung Suropati also Untung Surapati (c. 1660 – 5 December 1706) was a warfighter in the East Indies who led a few rebellions against the Dutch East India Company (VOC). Some of his exploits were written in Babad Tanah Jawi.

== Early life ==
Surapati was born Surawiraaji, a Balinese in the village of Gelgel. According to Buleleng sources he was the son of the general for the kingdom of Swecalinggarsa-pura Gelgel. After some conflict, his father alongside loyal followers sought refuge in Marga Tabanan village. Surapati, at the time four years old, was separated from the entourage when crossing the Ayung River. He was bought by VOC Captain van Beber in the Bali market. Surapati then lived as a slave in Batavia, the headquarters of the VOC (now Jakarta). He was then sold to other VOC officials until he was eventually bought by edeleer Moor, which gave him the nickname "Untung" (lit. lucky) because his career and fortune improved after acquiring him. He began a relationship with Moor's daughter Suzanne and had a son, Robert, Untung was imprisoned because of this. In prison, he became acquainted with Wirayuda and Kiai Ebun Jaladirya, who taught him Islam and formulated a plan against the Dutch. in 1678, he then managed to flee to the mountainous area in the south of the city, in Udug-udug, Western Java, before moving to Cisero in 1679 and becoming a brigand. The name "Surapati" was given to him because he was involved in a conflict with a prince from Cirebon called Raden Surapati, in which Untung was accused of undermining the Sultan of Cirebon. Untung was able to prove his innocence, and instead, Raden Surapati was shown to have plotted against the Sultan. Raden Surapati was sentenced to death and the Sultan gave the name "Surapati" to Untung, who then began to use the name "Untung Surapati".

== Surapati in Banten ==
The name "Surapati" was listed earlier in Dagh-Register 1676 among Balinese sworn on the Koran an oath of fidelity to the VOC. Other Balinese were Nayawangsa (or Wangsanaya) of Udug-Udug, Cakrayuda of Kamakoening, and Surayuda alongside Surapati from Cisero. However it is unclear whether this refers to the same Surapati as in 1680, Cakrayuda wrote a letter to VOC that his "brother Surapati" was killed against Bantenese Raiders, in a later letter from Cakrayuda and Nayawangsa this was mentioned again. However, later on, Surapati was listed among the Balinese who asked for orders from Dutch officer Jan Barvelt. In a letter dated 31 March 1683 to Captain Ruijs from Cikalong, 48 Balinese under Wirayuda alongside 27 others in ill health were ready to obey the Company command, Ruijs treated them well and with the promise to not enslave them again in the hope that a certain Surapati would also surrender. As he planned to make a Balinese unit to fight against Sultan Ageng Tirtayasa's followers, in the Banten civil war with his son Sultan Haji. On 5 May, Surapati joined with Ruijs and was put as lieutenant of the Balinese. Surapati and the Balinese were involved in the battle of Dayeuhluhur and Pamotan against Sheik Yusuf, (son-in-law of Tirtayasa) forces. Later on, Surapati was sent to meet with Pangeran Purbaya (another son of Ageng Tirtayasa) and his wife Raden Ayu Gusik Kusuma alongside fled to Gunung Gede and only wanted to surrender to a native VOC officer. Surapati was tasked to escort and negotiate with Pangeran Purbaya, as he only trusted native officers, and managed to deliver Purbaya's request for a house in Balabang southeast of Cikalong. However, Surapati would later be joined by Vaandrig Willem Kuffeler. Kuffeler demanded that Pangeran Purbaya surrender his kris and other valuables which then resulted in Pangeran Purbaya fleeing and breaking negotiations. Kuffeler then blamed this on Surapati and ordered him to pursue Pangeran Purbaya, while Surapati refused the order as he was of higher rank and only reported to Captain Ruijs, hearing Kuffeler threatened to put Surapati and his followers back into slavery, and in the following altercations slap Surapati's faces. Seeing these there was great turbulence among Surapati followers refusing to follow orders and wanting to take revenge.

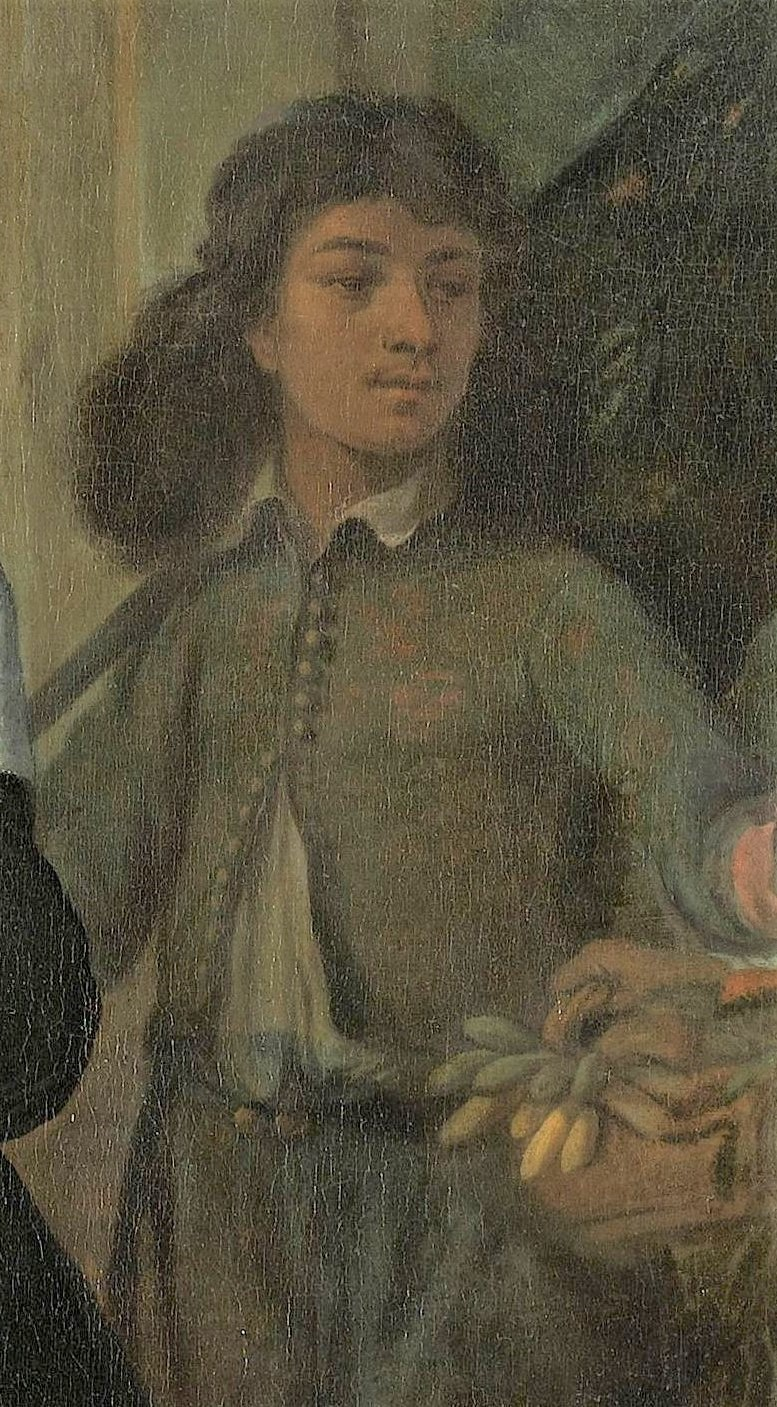
Possibly Untung Surapati, from Pieter Cnoll, Cornelia van Nijenroode, their Daughters, and Two Enslaved Servants, Jacob Jansz. Coeman, (1665)

In January 1684, with other soldiers, he attacked Kuffeler's camp which killed 15 Dutch and 28 Mardijker, although Kuffeler escaped. Meanwhile, Pangeran Purbaya surrendered on 7 February and was taken to Batavia. VOC at a loss on how to deal with Surapati's group enlisted Buleleng at first to pursue Surapati with the promise of pardon, however later found it unnecessary as Pangeran Purbaya surrendered and was in no danger of joining up with Surapati. Buleleng later wrote to Surapati to report to him in Cirebon and explain his actions, writing the company might distrust Balinese, who had been favored compared to Buginese and Makassarese. The company later also asked Captain Ruijs to write a letter to Surapati 'as if in his initiative', the possibility of a pardon if Surapati surrendered some of his most guilty followers. Another letter explains that Ruijs was in Batavia van Happel and Marten Samson was in charge in Cirebon, and they had received a letter from Surapati from Galunggang, that any of his followers not willing to come may be regarded as an enemy and be put to death, if he needed horses he can ask from Tumenggung of Sukapura. Meanwhile, in another letter, Tumenggung of Sukapura wrote to Samson and van Happel that he was awaiting orders to take up arms against Surapati's group. Surapati continued to hesitate with good reason as runaway slaves still had to repay his purchase price to their former owner which in effect returned them to slavery. Later at the end of April or early May, Surapati wrote to van Happel, that he could not come to Cirebon because of a 'sore leg'; both Surapati and Tumenggung of Sukapura would be sending a deputy to discuss the matter, Surapati would also send van Happel a bird and a horse as gifts. However, these negotiations did not produce an agreement which resulted in Surapati groups being declared enemies of VOC on 21 May. An expedition from Batavia to Cirebon by sea was sent in September 1674 under Jacob Couper, consisting of 457 Dutch and 300 Indonesian soldiers. On 24 September, Couper's expedition left Cirebon for Rajapolah, already forty Dutch soldiers fell ill and the heavy rain and marshy terrain made progress difficult. By early October they reached Rajapolah and Surapati would launch an attack in this neighborhood on 3 October with around 500 Balinese and 300 Javanese. The weather favoured the Dutch as the heavy rain stopped and they were able to use firearms killing about fifty to sixty of Surapati's men. Dutch pursuit would be hampered by heavy rain that caused flooding rivers meanwhile Surapati and his followers would reach Bagelen and Banyumas. Couper's expedition would be called off at this point because of the amount of sickness of his troops and he returned to Cirebon and met up with van Happel there.

== Surapati at Kartasura ==
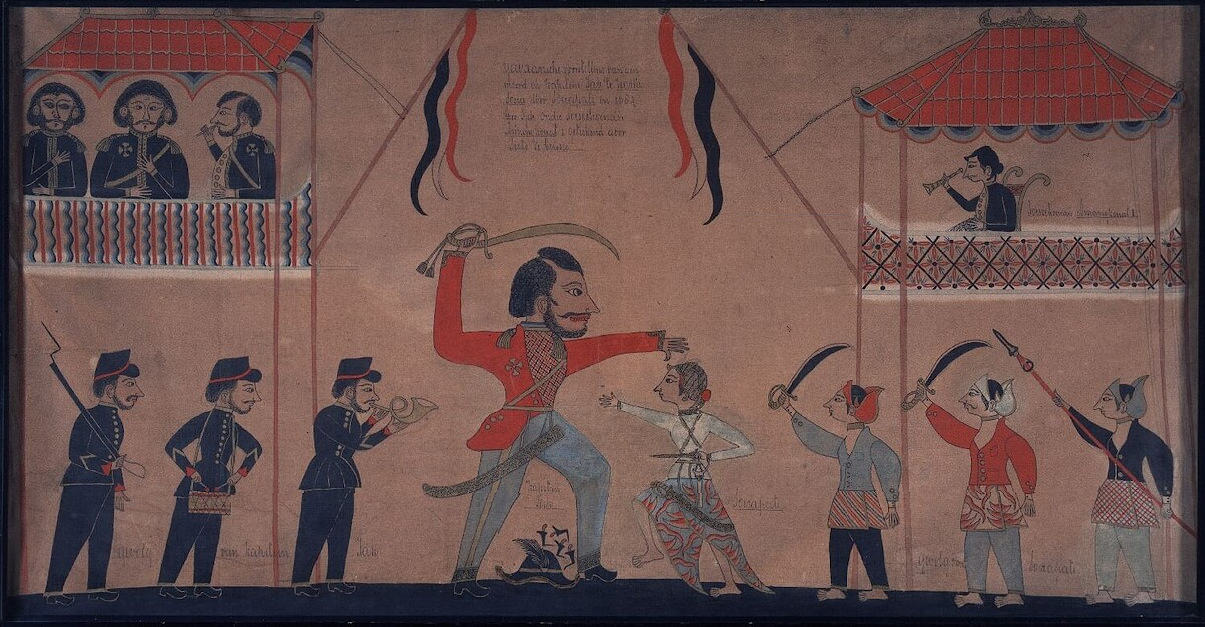
Traditional Javanese drawing depicting the killing of Captain François Tack by Surapati in Kartasura (1686) under Susuhunan Amangkurat II, Tirto of Grisek, 1890–1900.

Banyumas-Bagelen area at this time was filled with former soldiers, freebooters, and mercenaries, primarily of Balinese and Makassarese who fought for the rebels in the Trunajaya rebellion. Arriving in Banyumas, Surapati would be stopped by Arya Panalika or Wirabrata, a local commander, who killed around ten of Surapati's men. When confronted by Surapati for an explanation, Arya Panalika fled, he would later be removed from his position because of this display of cowardice. Surapati would later be confronted by two Mataram forces, men from Wates and Kedu under Ngabeis Wiriwadigda, Wiramija, and Madaraka, as well as from Bagelen under the brothers Surayuda and Wira. They entered into negotiation facilitated by Balinese who served the Sunan of Mataram, listed as Singabarong, Wangsanata, and Mangkuyuda. Later on, the Patih of Mataram, Nrangkusuma, leader of the anti-Dutch party in Mataram court, would meet with Surapati and subsequently informed Greving, commandant of the Dutch garrison at Kartasura, that he would be accepted into Mataram's service in return in killing the 'kramans' or rebel leaders.

Surapati was quick to prove his usefulness and got to work immediately in defeating 400-man strong rebel bands in Kembang Kuning in Kedu in a fierce fight. Grieving, disturbed by this, advised the Sunan to send the victorious Surapati to Semarang or other coastal regions, but he would be ignored and Surapati would be invited to the capital. Surapati would later present Sunan Amangkurat II at Kartasura, the head of six rebel leaders, alongside 80 fighting men, 20 sick or otherwise disabled, 60 women and children, followed by Javanese force and a band of conquered enemies. Surapati would be given land not far from the Patih Nrangkusuma and was installed as bodyguard and protégé of Amangkurat II. Grieving would like to attack Surapati with his 102 men at Kartasura, however, he had to wait for authority in Batavia, but by this time, Surapati had become too powerful.

Amangkurat II however was willing to discuss this with the Hoge Regering and sent 3 envoys to Batavia who arrived on 2 June. In the letter brought, Amangkurat II explained that he accepted Surapati because his subordinates in Banyumas had not been able to deal with Surapati, and he had induced Surapati and his men to leave by offering land in Kendal, Demak, and Kaliwungu without success. He therefore added the company for advice as he cannot trust his subordinates. The issue of Surapati was among several matters discussed in which the Company wished to settle with Mataram. By 8/9 May 1685, Captain François Tack was appointed as special envoy to lead an expedition to Mataram. His instructions 61 pages long were ready by 31 October. The most important of these matters was the debt of Mataram in return for supporting them in the Trunajaya rebellion, Captain Tack was empowered to reduce this debt from f 4,600,000 to f 344,000. Other matters included delimitation of VOC and Mataram territory, especially about Cirebon, the maintenance of the Company monopoly of trade in opium and clothes, and the enforcement of the provision under the 1677 contract, in which Mataram cannot harbor foreign elements including Balinese and Makassarese in its territory. Tack's instruction on Surapati was included in the 'Secret Appendix' where he can offer a reward for Surapati's death or if free pardon. In short, Tack was empowered to use all means, both open and clandestine, to get Surapati either dead or alive. The content of this 'Secret Appendix' became widely known in Mataram but not other matters like the reduction of debt, as a result, Tack's expedition was seen as a wholly menacing punitive expedition. Tack's expedition set out from Batavia on 3 November 1685, he arrived in Semarang on 22 December. It was on 27 January, when Sindureja, a Mataram officer, and Suranata, regent of Demak arrived. By 30 January, enough horses and provisions were prepared for the expedition to Kartasura. On 2 February the expedition arrived in Kartasura and joined with Greving's garrison.

In 1686 the VOC sent Captain Tack to Kartasura to convince Amangkurat to deliver Surapati to him. Tack arrived and claimed himself as Amangkurat's soldier who attacked Surapati's residence. This attack was a sneak raid because Amangkurat did not intend to deliver Surapati as he considered him a precious ally. Tack was killed by Surapati's men along with 74 other Dutch and Javanese soldiers disguised as Balinese. The rest of the VOC forces retreated to the Dutch garrison of Kartasura.

== Surapati in East Java ==
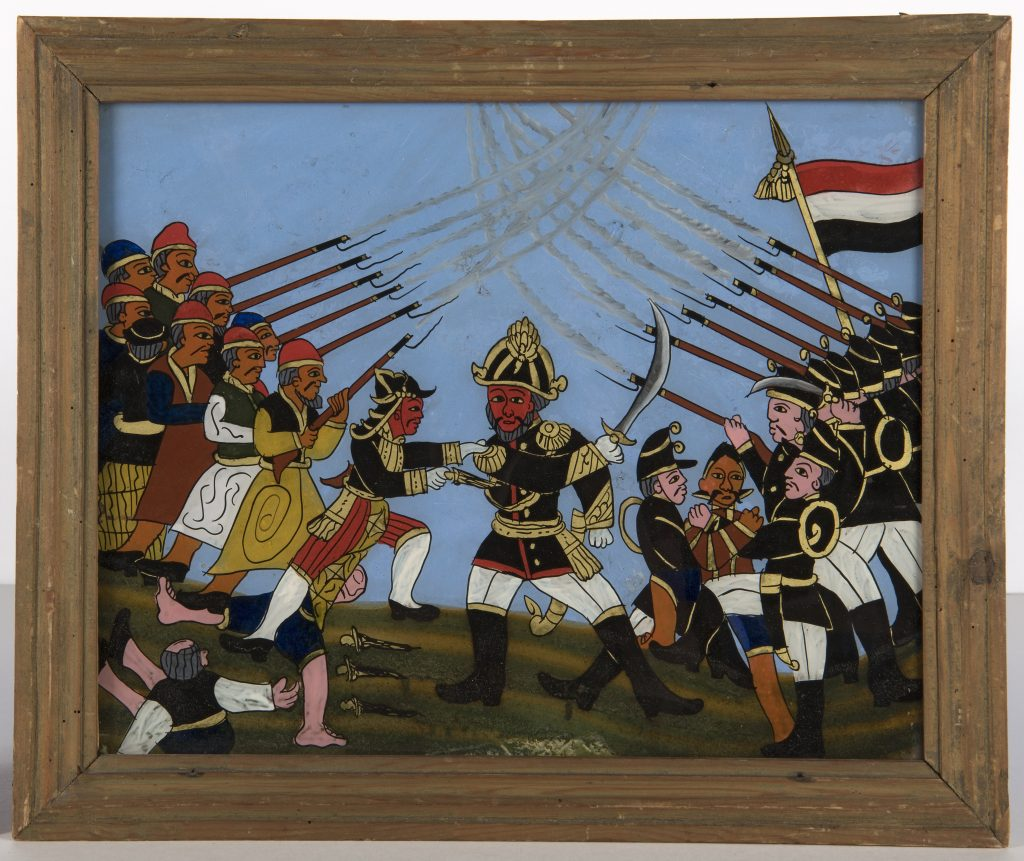
An unknown artist's depiction of the attack on Captain Tack at Kartasura by Untung Suropati

Surapati then left Kartasura for Pasuruan in East Java, where he carved out a stronghold in the land of Mataram. According to Babad tradition, he was given the title "Tumenggung Wiranegara" and ruled as the fifth Adipati of Pasuruan. Amangkurat did not intend to be dispossessed and in 1690 he sent an army that was then defeated by Surapati, whose mastery of military techniques was acquired from his experience in Dutch troops, which gave him an advantage over the Javanese. In 1699, the stronghold of Surapati extended over a significant part of East Java and included Madiun.

Amangkurat II died in 1703. His son succeeded him under the title of Amangkurat III. The new successor had sympathies for Surapati. But he was contested by one of his brothers, Prince Puger. In the following year, the VOC recognized Puger as the new Sultan, he took the title of Pakubuwono I. It was the beginning of the First Javanese War of Succession. In 1705, a coalition formed by Javanese soldiers from different regions of the archipelago, as well as the VOC armed force, marched on Kartasura. Amangkurat III must fled, he then joined Surapati. The latter was killed in 1706 during an attack by joint forces of Pakubuwono, Madurese, and VOC soldiers.

Surapati was conferred the title of "National Hero of Indonesia" by the Suharto regime in 1975.
