= Mangkunegara of Kartasura =

- Kanjeng Gusti Pangeran Adipati Arya Mangkunegara
- Born: Raden Mas Sura; 1703; Kêblokan, Nglaroh, Mataram Sultanate
- Died: 1738 (aged 34–35); Cape Town, South Africa
- Burial: Pakubuwanan Complex, Imogiri Royal Cemetery
- Spouse: Raden Ayu Ragaasmara; Raden Ayu Wulan (m. 1715; died 1727)
- Issue more...: Mangkunegara I
- House: Mataram
- Father: Amangkurat IV (biological); Pangeran Adipati Purbaya (adoptive)
- Mother: Mas Ayu Sumanarsa

Kanjeng Gusti Pangeran Adipati Arya Mangkunegara (1703–1738) was a former Mataram crown prince, the eldest son of Amangkurat IV, born to his concubine, Mas Ayu Sumanarsa. He was the ancestor of Mangkunegaran.

== Early life ==
He was born during the reign of his grandfather, Pakubuwana I, in Kêblokan, Nglaroh. Later, her mother was elevated to Raden Ayu Kilen or Raden Ayu Sepuh. He was raised by his uncle Pangeran ("Prince") Adipati Purbaya in the Kapurbayan residence.

Upon reaching adulthood, he was granted the position of Pangeran Riya and arranged to marry Raden Ayu Ragaasmara, daughter of Panembahan Cakraningrat of Madura. The elderly Pakubuwana I told his queen, Ratu Pakubuwana, his wish to see his most beloved granddaughter Raden Ajeng Wulan, daughter of Pangeran Balitar marriage to his eldest grandson, Raden Mas Damar, a son of Pangeran Adipati Anom who was adopted by Pangeran Purbaya, while he was still reigning. Their marriage was held on 1715 (1639 AJ). Her death was followed by her third son, Raden Mas Sakadi.

During the reign of Amangkurat IV, he stripped the Adipati's title from his younger brothers, Pangeran Adipati Purbaya and Pangeran Adipati Balitar, also their lands, troops, and ceremonial privileges. Prince Purbaya accepted; however, Prince Balitar was disappointed and came to their uncle, Prince Arya Mataram. Prince Arya Mataram suggested to him to obey, for an elder brother was the standing of a father. In addition, he suggested that he persuade his elder brother, Prince Dipanegara, who had already proclaimed himself as Panembahan Herucakra in Madiun to return to the palace. Seeing him stubborn, Prince Arya Mataram advice to discuss it again with his elder brother, Prince Purbaya.

When Prince Balitar came to Kapurbayan again, Prince Purbaya told him to accept. Prince Balitar sent his trusted servant to the captain commandant who was guarding the court, only to get another refusal. Desperate, at another midnight, he, with his thousand followers, came to his brother again, asking for his blessing, even if it meant dying on the battlefield. Prince Purbaya was shocked but later decided to accompany him. Due to his fondness for his adoptive father, Prince Riya joined them. Prince Purbaya himself crowned Prince Balitar as Sultan Ibnu Mustapa with Prince Riya as Adipati Anom.

Long story short, Prince Balitar died of illness. His body was returned to the capital in Kartasura and buried in Imogiri. Prince Purbaya and Prince Riya reunited with Prince Dipanegara. Tuwan Amral sent a letter with Adipati Surapati as the delegation. Prince Purbaya agreed to meet VOC as long as they forgave Panembahan Herucakra, Adipati Natapura, Adipati Suradilaga, and Adipati Surapati. The VOC promised him a crown in Semarang; however, instead they exiled him to Batavia. Panembahan Herucakra was exiled to Cape Town, and the three adipatis were sent to Selong Island.

Returned to Kartasura, his father bestowed on him the title of Pangeran Adipati Arya Mangkunegara, and he resided in the ex-Kapurbayan. In his advanced age, he wanted his eldest son to succeed him; however, this was challenged by his younger son, Pangeran Adipati Anom. Moreover, his queen consort, Ratu Kadipaten, insisted that he choose one of her four sons. Amangkurat IV ordered Patih Danureja to write a letter to Batavia, reporting his will regarding the successor: it would be Prince Adipati Arya Mangkunegara, if not; Prince Adipati Anom, if not; one of four princes born to Ratu Kadipaten.

While staying in the palace for his sick father, his Kablitaran wife gave birth to a son, named Raden Mas Said by his grandfather. In his deathbed, Amangkurat IV entrusted a kris to the Ratu Ageng reserved for Prince Arya Mangkunegara. Although she gave the kris as the late Susuhunan's wish, she colluded with Patih Danureja to crown her son, Prince Adipati Anom. He ascended the throne as Pakubuwana II with his eldest brother acting as regent.

== Conflict ==
He deeply mourned the passing of Wulan. Although he was ready to remarry, no one captured his heart until the day he saw the Susuhunan's neglected concubine, Mas Ayu Larasati. She was a daughter of Demang Cakrayuda of Karang, rumored to have Chinese lineage, originally from Semarang. He asked his brother to give him that concubine.

Seeing the young Susuhunan not in a good mood, Patih Danureja suggested that he hand over his brother to the VOC. The VOC brought him to Batavia, and eventually to Cape Town, South Africa, until his death. Similar to his uncle, his body was sent back to Java and buried in Imogiri.

== Family ==
Mangkunegara's children
Personal name	Granted name, title, and style(s)	Mother	Ref.
Raden Mas Ali (Ngali)	Kanjeng Pangeran Tirtakusuma; of Pancuran	Raden Ayu Ragaasmara	
Raden Ajeng Dhoplang		Raden Ayu Ragaasmara	
Raden Mas Ambiya	Raden Mas Martakusuma; Pangeran Panenggak; Kanjeng Pangeran Arya Pamot	Concubine	
Raden Mas Sabar	Raden Mas Wiryakusuma; Pangeran Timur; Kanjeng Pangeran Arya Mangkudiningrat	Concubine	
Raden Mas Umar		Raden Ayu Wulan	
Raden Mas Said, Raden Mas Peksi	Raden Mas Suryakusuma; Pangeran Prangwadana; Kanjeng Gusti Pangeran Adipati Arya Mangkunegara I	Raden Ayu Wulan	
Raden Mas Sakadi		Disputed: Raden Ayu Wulan or by concubine	
	Raden Ayu Tirtawiguna; Raden Ayu Puspakusuma	Concubine	
	Raden Ayu Tirtayuda	Concubine	
	Kanjeng Pangeran Kap (Kab)	Concubine	
	Raden Ayu Mangkuyuda	Concubine	
	Raden Mas Arya Toyakusuma	Concubine	
	Raden Mas Arya Warihkusuma	Concubine	
	Raden Mas Arya Ranukusuma	Concubine	
	Raden Ayu Mangunyuda; of Banyumas	Concubine	
