= Jagatara-bumi =

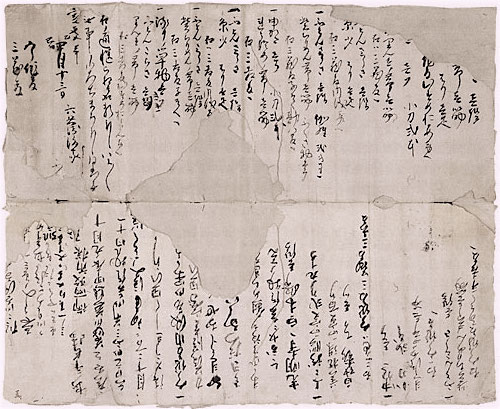
Letter home from Fuku, thirteenth day of the fourth month, Kanbun 5 (1665) (Matsura Historical Museum)

Jagatara-bumi (ジャガタラ文), or Letters from Jacatra, is a series of surviving letters sent to Japan from children born of relationships between foreign men and Japanese women in the seventeenth century who were exiled to Batavia due to the Tokugawa policy of national seclusion.

== Historical background ==
The year after the Sakoku Edict of 1635, which prohibited overseas travel by Japanese and placed strict restrictions on foreigners entering Japan, some 287 children born of Nanban traders from Portugal and Spain to Japanese women were banished to Macao. Three years later, in 1639, the children of red-haired English and Dutch traders with Japanese women were banished to Batavia along with their mothers, thirty-two in all. In the following years there were further expulsions. A series of letters to family and friends accompanying gifts and requesting necessities survives, a genre known as Jagatara-bumi.

== Letters ==
Oharu (お春) (Jeronima) was the daughter of Niccolò Marino, Italian captain of a Portuguese vessel, and Maria, a Japanese woman known only by her Christian name. She left Hirado on the VOC ship Breda at the age of 14 or 15 in October 1639. Her long letter included by Nishikawa Joken in his 1719 Nagasaki Yawagusa (長崎夜話草) is a literary elaboration, but a copy of the original of 1681, accompanying a string of gifts to family and friends, has recently come to light.

Cornelia was the daughter of Cornelis van Nijenrode and Surishia, who married Handa Goemon (半田五右衛門) after Cornelis' death. A letter of 1663 by Cornelia to her mother and Goemon is known, as well as one of 1671 accompanying gifts of textiles.

Other surviving letters include one of 1665 by Fuku (ふく), widow of Rokubee (六兵衛), to Tanimura Gorōsaku (谷村五郎作) and Sanzō (三蔵); and that on an embroidered silk fukusa enclosing a box of tea, from Koshoro (コショロ), now at the Hirado Dutch Trading Post.

== See also ==
- Kakure kirishitan
- Koxinga
- Hāfu
