= First Javanese War of Succession =

1704–08 Dutch colonial war in Mataram

- Part of Javanese Wars of Succession
Date	1704–1708
Location	Java
Result	Dutch (VOC) victory; Amangkurat III abdicated; Pangeran Puger took the throne as Pakubuwono I; Amangkurat III exiled to Batavia, then Ceylon
Territorial changes	Territorial concession from Mataram to the VOC: Mataram ceded Priangan, Madura, Semarang to the VOC; Cirebon became VOC protectorate

Belligerents
Mataram Sultanate; Forces supporting Amangkurat III	(VOC); Forces supporting Pangeran Puger

Commanders and leaders
Amangkurat III; Untung Surapati †	Govert Knol; Pangeran Puger (later Pakubuwana I)

Strength
Unknown	46,000

The First Javanese War of Succession was a struggle between Sultan Amangkurat III of Mataram and the Dutch East India Company who supported the claim of the Sultan's uncle, Pangeran Puger to the throne.

Amangkurat II died in 1703 and was briefly succeeded by his son, Amangkurat III. The Dutch believed they had found a more reliable client in his uncle Pangeran Puger. Tensions increased when Amangkurat was accused of giving refuge to the rebel Surapati. Pangeran Puger accused Amangkurat before the Dutch of planning an uprising in East Java. Unlike Pangeran Puger, Amangkurat III inherited blood connection with Surabayan ruler, Jangrana II, from Amangkurat II and this lent credibility to the allegation that he cooperated with the now powerful Untung Surapati in Pasuruan. Panembahan Cakraningrat II of Madura, VOC's most trusted ally, persuaded the Dutch to support Pangeran Puger. Pangeran Puger took the title of Pakubuwana I upon his accession in June 1704.

Together with the Dutch, Pakubuwono defeated Amangkurat who fled east and received refuge from Surapati who had set up his own kingdom. The war dragged on for five years before the Dutch managed to install Pakubuwana. In August 1705, Pakubuwono I's retainers and VOC forces captured Kartasura without resistance from Amangkurat III, whose forces cowardly turned back when the enemy reached Ungaran. Surapati's forces in Bangil, near Pasuruan, was crushed by the alliance of VOC, Kartasura and Madura in 1706.

Jangrana II, who tended to side with Amangkurat III and did not venture any assistance to the capture of Bangil, was called to present himself before Pakubuwana I and murdered there by VOC's request in the same year. Amangkurat III ran away to Malang with Surapati's descendants and his remnant forces but Malang was then a no-man's-land who offered no glory fit for a king. Therefore, though allied operations to the eastern interior of Java in 1706–08 did not gain much success in military terms, the fallen king surrendered in 1708 after being lured with the promises of household (lungguh) and land, but he was banished to Ceylon along with his wives and children.

== See also ==
- Javanese Wars of Succession

== Sources ==
- Kohn, George C. (2006). Dictionary of Wars. Infobase Publishing. ISBN 9781438129167.
- Pigeaud, Theodore Gauthier Thomas (1976). Islamic States in Java 1500–1700: Eight Dutch Books and Articles by Dr H. J. de Graaf. The Hague: Martinus Nijhoff. p. 103. ISBN 90-247-1876-7.
- Ricklefs, M.C. (11 September 2008). A History of Modern Indonesia Since C.1200. Palgrave Macmillan. pp. 103–105. ISBN 978-1-137-05201-8.
