= Vorstenlanden =

Four native states on Java, Dutch East Indies

Vorstenlanden ꧋ꦥꦿꦗꦏꦗꦮꦺꦤ꧀
- Principality territory
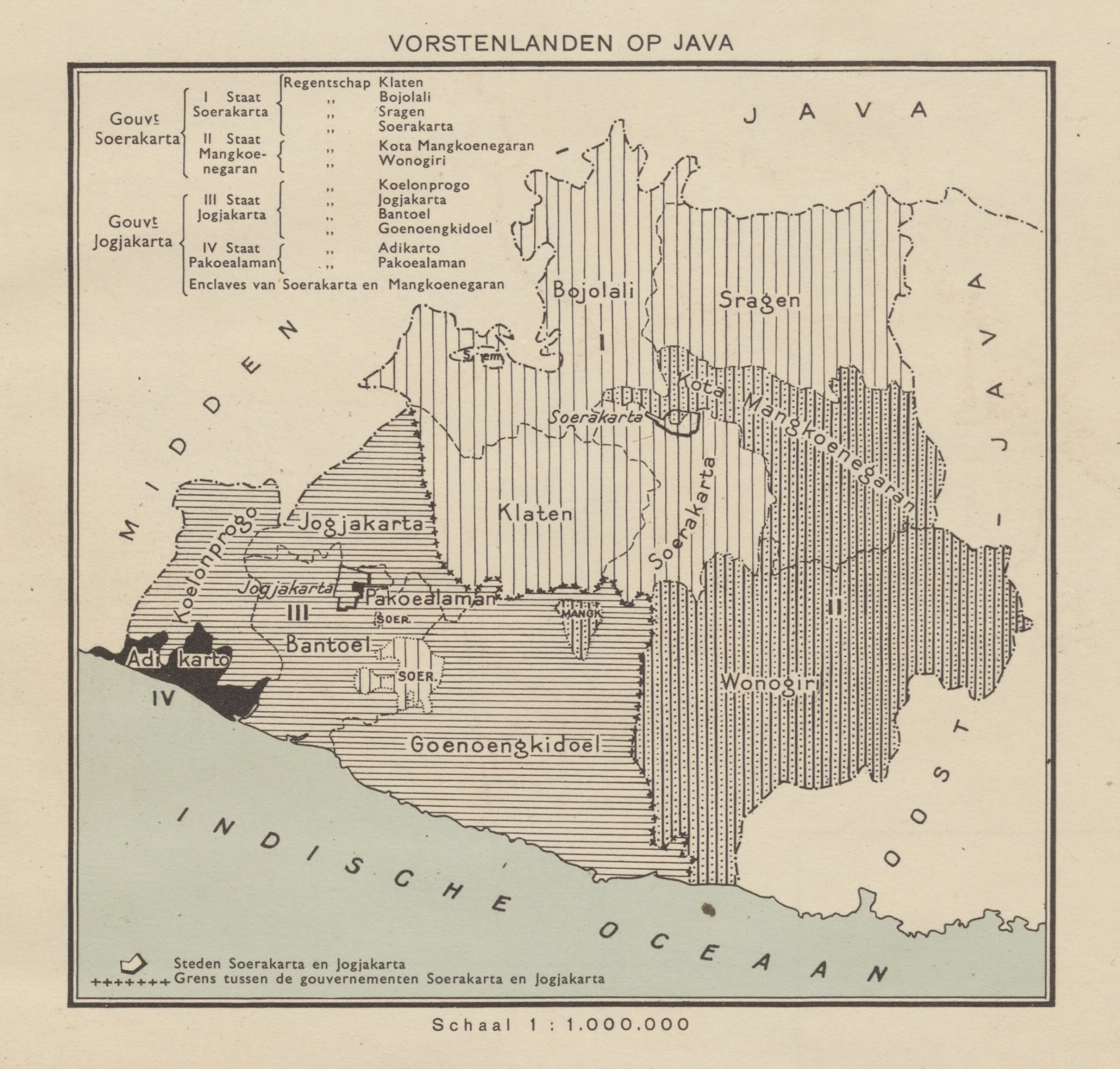
- The areas of the Vorstenlanden that still survived in 1939.
- States: Surakarta Sunanate, Yogyakarta Sultanate in the colonial Dutch East Indies
- Founded: 1755
- Disbanded: 1945

The Vorstenlanden (Dutch for 'princely lands' or 'princely states', Japanese: 公地, Hepburn: kōchi, Nihon-shiki/Kunrei-shiki: kooti, Indonesian: wilayah swapraja, wilayah kepangeranan, Javanese: ꧋ꦥꦿꦗꦏꦗꦮꦺꦤ꧀, praja kajawèn) were four native, princely states on the island of Java in the colonial Dutch East Indies. They were nominally self-governing vassals under suzerainty of the Kingdom of the Netherlands. Their political autonomy however became increasingly constrained by severe treaties and settlements. Two of these continue to exist as a princely territory within the current independent republic of Indonesia.

The four Javanese princely states were:

- Surakarta, a sunanate to the north
- Yogyakarta, the sultanate to the south
- Mangkunegaran, a duchy or principality to the east
- Pakualaman, a small duchy or principality largely enclosed within the area of the Sultanate of Yogyakarta

These princely territories were successor states to the Mataram Sultanate and originated in civil wars and wars of succession within the Javanese nobility. The susuhunan of Surakarta represented the direct line of succession; the other three rulers represented cadet branches.

== History ==
When Mataram was not yet divided, the Dutch colonial administration named the area under its control Bovenlanden. Then, the Treaty of Giyanti, signed in 1755, divided Mataram into two, namely Surakarta and Yogyakarta with their respective territories and the Great State (Negara Agung) which was governed jointly. At that time, its area stretched from present-day Cilacap to around Mount Kelud in East Java. After the Third Javanese War of Succession and the treaty was ratified, the Sultanate of Mataram split into the Surakarta Sunanate and the Yogyakarta Sultanate (contemporaneous Dutch spelling: Djokjakarta); the Duchy of Mangkunegaran split from Surakarta in 1757. Lastly, the Duchy of Pakualaman split off from Yogyakarta in 1812, during the British interregnum, after the Invasion of Java (1811).

The native rulers were formally considered 'autocrats' by the colonial authorities and all land in their territories was considered their property. However, they did not have jurisdiction over Europeans or 'non-indigenous Orientals', and most native law courts were eventually replaced by Dutch colonial ones. The colonial government also assumed authority in other areas; the princely territories did not have their own postal services, for instance. Dutch colonial administrators assumed the role of 'older brother' to the native princes, a relationship which was ritually symbolised by native princes taking the right arm of Dutch residents and governors during public ceremonies. The native rulers were styled as Princely Highness by the Dutch authorities. Like the particuliere landerijen [private domains], the princely states were not directly controlled by the colonial government, and so were not subjected to the Cultivation System, introduced by Governor-General Johannes van den Bosch in 1830 in the rest of Java.

== Modern day ==
=== Sultanate of Yogyakarta and Duchy of Pakualaman ===
The Sultanate of Yogyakarta is the only princely land which retains a special status within the current Republic of Indonesia, namely as a daerah istimewa (special region). The former princely land of Pakualaman is administered as part of Yogyakarta. The Sultan of Yogyakarta and the Duke of Pakualaman also hold political office as Governor and Lieutenant Governor of the Special Region of Yogyakarta. Under a law passed in 2012, the Sultan is automatically governor of Yogyakarta, while the Duke of Pakualaman is lieutenant governor, making the positions hereditary. This is unique in Indonesia as the governors and vice governors of all the other provinces are popularly elected for two five-year terms.

=== Sultanate of Surakarta and Duchy or Principality of Mangkunegaran ===
Although the Sultanate of Surakarta and Duchy or Principality of Mangkunegaran were merged into the province of Central Java after independence in 1946, the traditional monarchies were not abolished, and still exist to this day. However, they do not have any political and governmental powers and are cultural and ceremonial figureheads that have considerable influence in Javanese culture conservation and development. Meanwhile, the political powers are held by the Mayor and Vice Mayor of Surakarta and the regents and deputy regents of the regencies that cover their traditional territories, all of them elected for two 5-year terms.

== Gallery ==
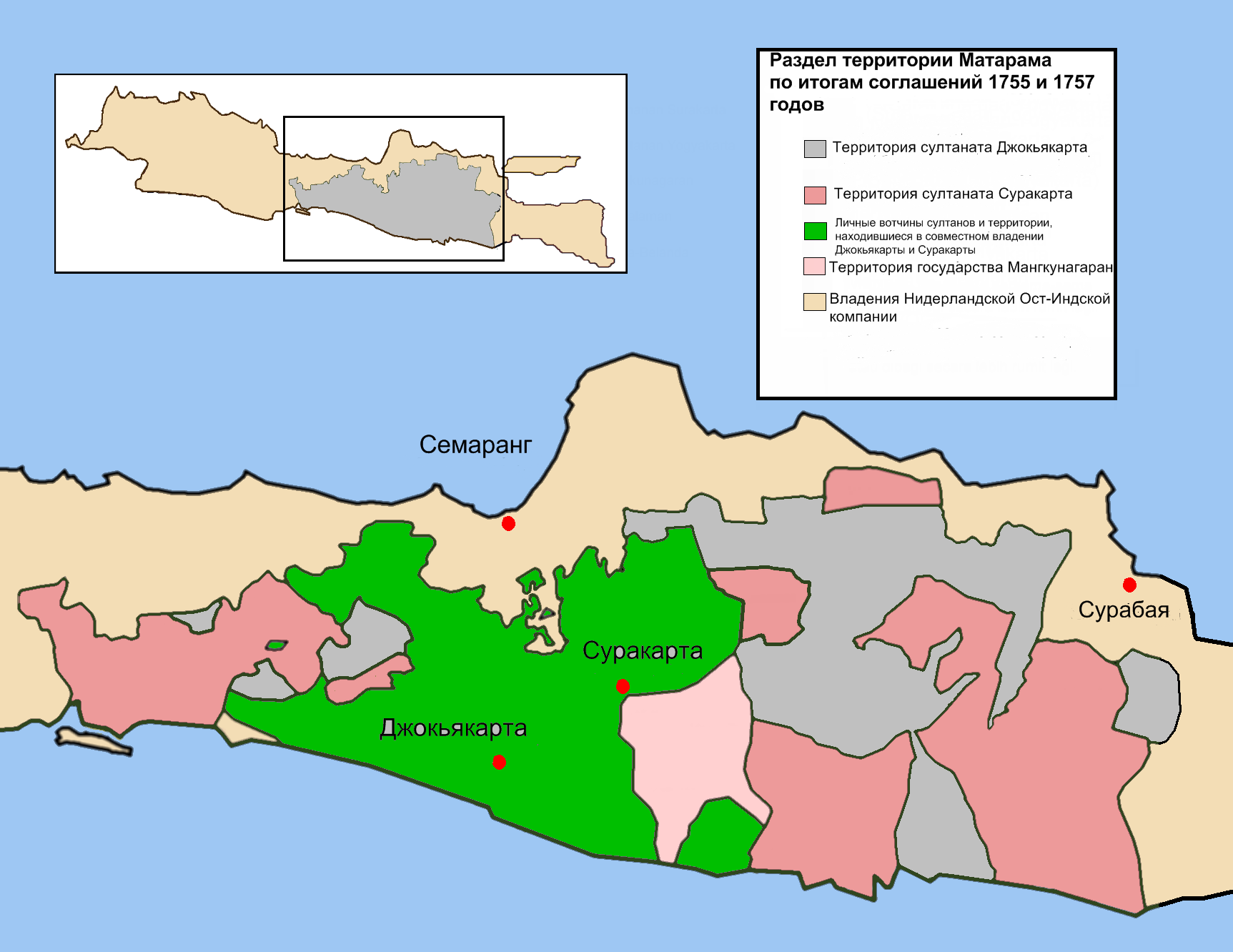
The Vorstenlanden in 1757.

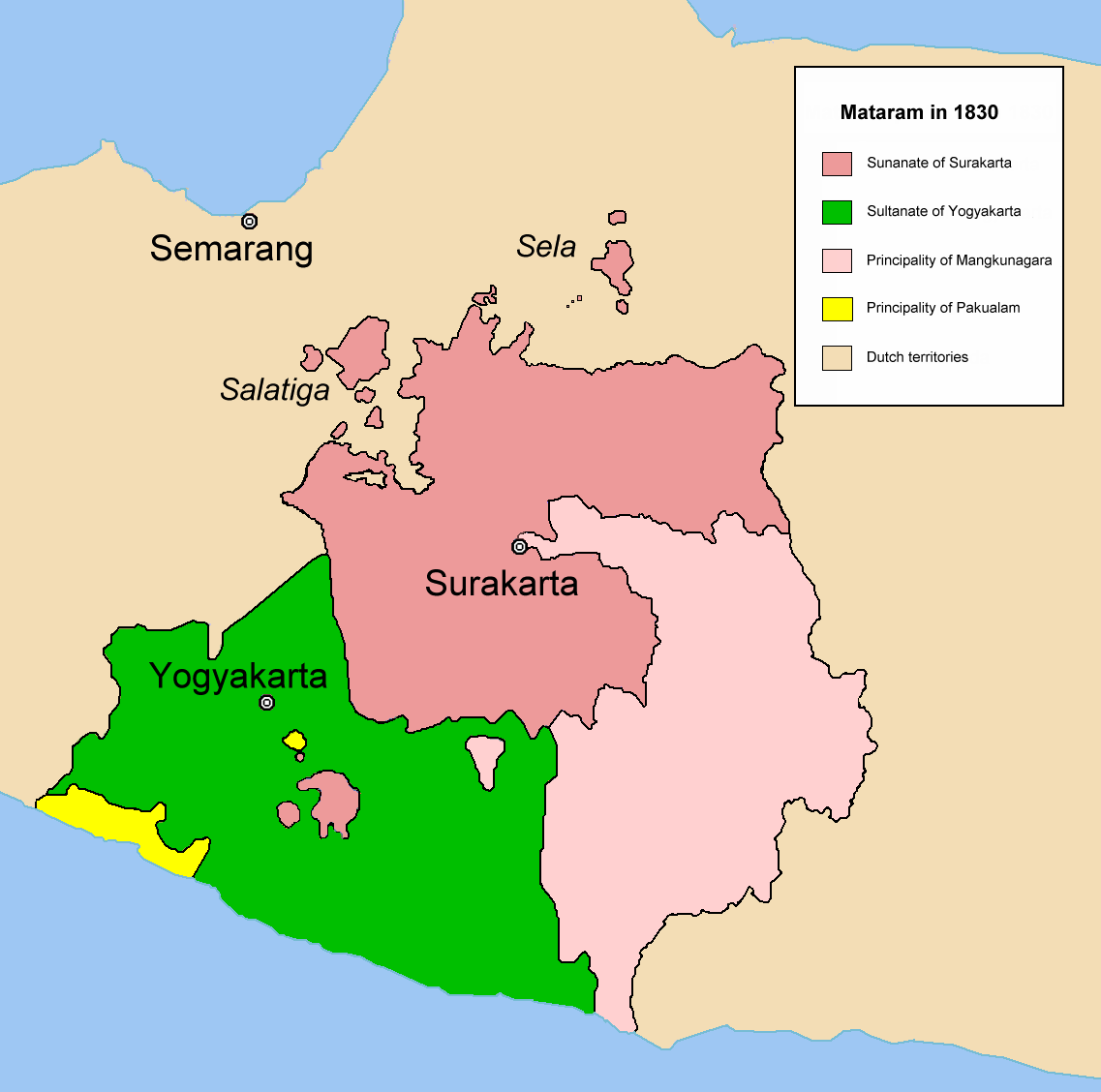
The Vorstenlanden in 1830.

== See also ==
- Indian honorifics, Filipino, Indonesian, Malay and Thai titles originated from these
- Greater India
- Indosphere
- List of Indonesian monarchies
- Princely state
- Principality
