= Pakubuwono II =

Susuhunan of Surakarta

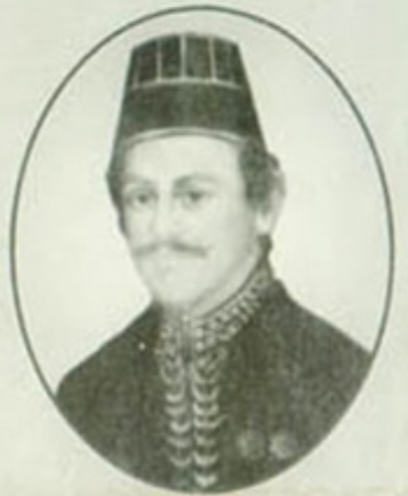

Susuhunan of Mataram
- Reign: 1726–1742
- Coronation: 2 June 1726
- Predecessor: Amangkurat IV
- Successor: Amangkurat V
- Reign: 1743–1749
- Predecessor: Amangkurat V
- Successor: Pakubuwono III
- Born: Raden Mas Prabasuyasa; 8 December 1711; Kartasura Palace, Kartasura, Mataram Sultanate
- Died: 20 December 1749 (aged 38); Surakarta, Mataram Sultanate
- Spouse: Gusti Kanjeng Ratu Hemas (m. 1726; died 1738)
- Issue: Gusti Kanjeng Ratu Timur; Pakubuwana III
Regnal name
- Sampeyan Dalem Ingkang Sinuhun Kanjeng Susuhunan Pakubuwana Senapati ing Ngalaga Abdurrahman Sayyidin Panatagama Ingkang Jumeneng Kaping II
- House: Mataram
- Father: Amangkurat IV
- Mother: Gusti Kanjeng Ratu Kencana

Pakubuwono II (also transliterated Pakubuwana II) (1711–1749) was the last ruler of Mataram Sultanate and the first Sunan of the Surakarta Sunanate which was established after the collapse of the former Sultanate due to the Third Javanese War of Succession

His correct title in Javanese etiquette standards contains honorific appellations, some of which each successive ruler inherits. The move of his court from Kartasura to Surakarta was to avert the calamities that occurred at the former palace.

== Early life ==
He was the son of Amangkurat IV by his queen consort. His mother expected him to be named heir, while his father preferred his elder concubine-born brother, who was already appointed as Kanjeng Pangeran Adipati Arya Mangkunegara. The disagreement led the queen's two children to seclusion. The Susuhunan married the queen's younger sister and was installed as the new queen under the name Ratu Kencana or Ratu Kadipaten.

Before his death, the Susuhunan summoned Patih Danureja and the queen to leave his will to crown Kanjeng Pangeran Adipati Anom Mangkunegara as his successor. After the late Susuhunan's burial, Patih Danureja explained to the queen dowager (Ratu Ageng) that Kanjeng Pangeran Adipati Anom would be crowned soon. Ratu Ageng disagreed; she asked him to tell the Dutch that she wanted her son to be named heir instead.

At night, the patih gathered the royal family and asked their opinions. Pangeran Madura supported Kanjeng Pangeran Arya Mangkunegara, as the other sons were still young. Ki Jayaningrat preferred Raden Mas Ambiya, although also a concubine-born, but his mother was a noble daughter of Adipati Sindupraya of Pemalang. Patih Danureja was annoyed as they didn't get agreement. He dismissed them, but before that, the adipatis and wedanas had already been required to put their stamps on the paper prepared. The patih sent the letter to the Governor General in Batavia.

The Dutch arrived with the letter from Batavia. It seemed he was the first one shaking the Dutch's hand, thus crowned as Pakubuwana II. The entire hall was illuminated by the smile of the queen dowager.

Noted that Ki Jayaningrat referred to Cakraningrat, Adipati of Sampang, and Raden Mas Ambiya referred to Raden Mas Sandeya (the future Kyai Nur Iman Mlangi).

== Personal life ==
After his coronation, he summoned Patih Danureja, ordered him to send a letter to the Governor General in Batavia, expressed his greetings and respects. The patih chose Ki Ngabehi Cakrakerti as the delegation.

On the same day, at the Danurejan residence, the patih held an audience with the royal officials and asked them which girl was most suitable as queen consort. Kyai Kanduruan suggested one of Panembahan Purbaya's daughters as the astrologer had seen that one of his grandsons would be the future monarch and that the palace would be moved to the east. The patih remembered rumors that the palace would be moved had been spread.

Kyai Kanduruan suggested the youngest daughter, Raden Ajeng Suwiyah, who was left in Mangkuprajan and likely had reached puberty. She had been entrusted to Raden Ayu Mangkupraja while her father was in Batavia. She wed as the queen consort, titled Gusti Kanjeng Ratu Kencana. Sometimes, she was also mentioned as Gusti Kanjeng Ratu Hemas or Ratu Mas, daughter of Pangeran Adipati Purbaya, son of Pakubuwana I. Thus, she was the king's first cousin, paternally.

She gave birth to Raden Mas Priyambada, who unfortunately died not long after. The Susuhunan, in his grief, kept a distance from her. Only with the various efforts made by Patih Danureja, she gave birth to Raden Mas Suryadi, nicknamed Raden Mas Ured, also known as Raden Mas Gusti Suryakusuma (the future Pakubuwana III). She gave birth to a son; however died not long after, and was followed by his mother. Her husband didn't wed any queen consort again.

== Ancestry ==
Ancestors of Pakubuwono II

Amangkurat I
Pakubuwana I
Ratu Wetan
Amangkurat IV
Pangeran Tumenggung Balitar
Gusti Kanjeng Ratu Pakubuwana
Pakubuwana II
Raden Adipati Sumadipura of Pati
Raden Adipati Tirtakusuma of Kudus
Gusti Kanjeng Ratu Kencana

Preceded by Amangkurat IV	Susuhunan of Mataram; 1726–1742	Succeeded by Amangkurat V
Preceded by Amangkurat V	Susuhunan of Mataram; 1743–1749	Succeeded by Pakubuwono III
