= Cornelis van Nijenrode =

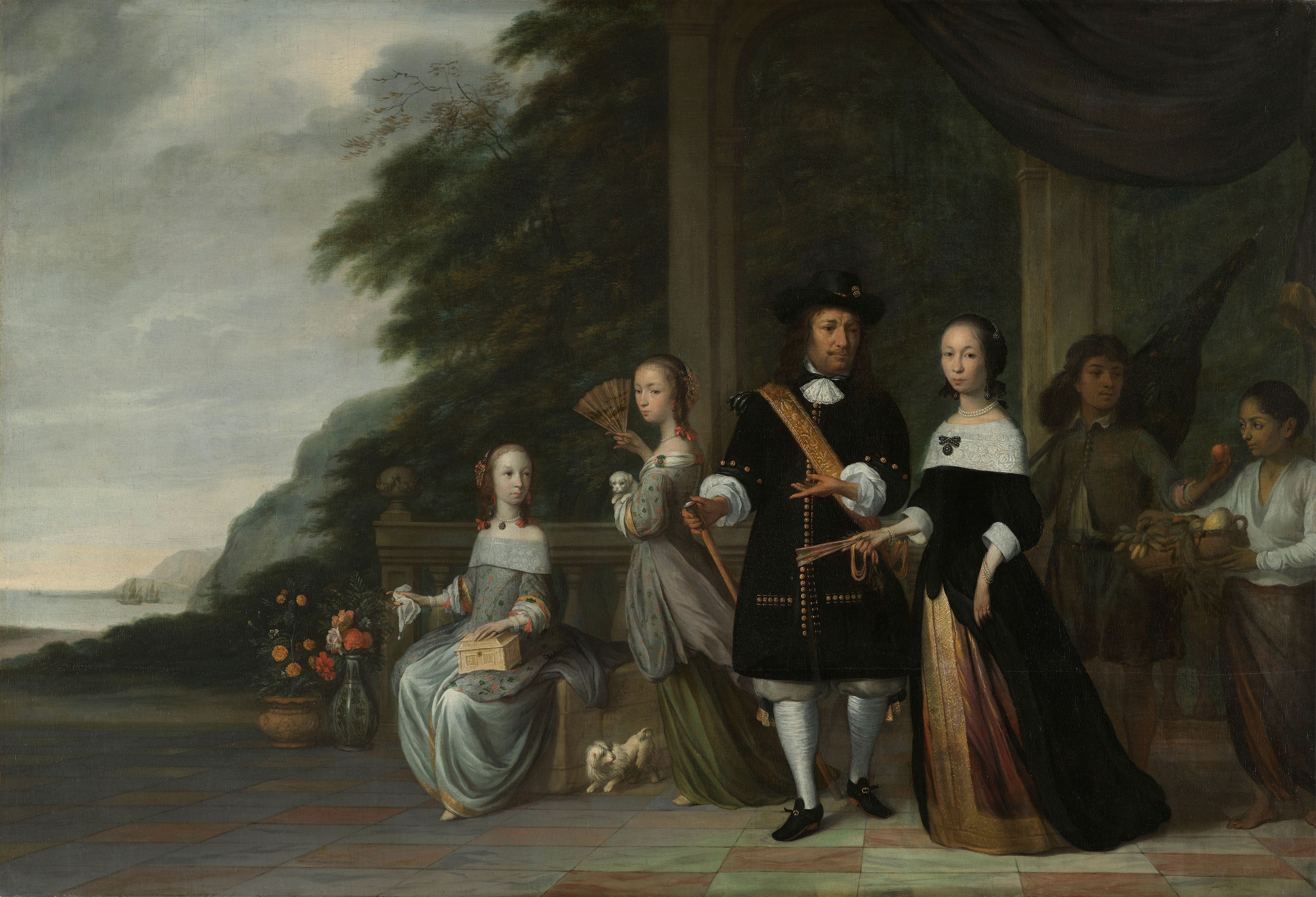
Portrait of Cornelia, daughter of Cornelis van Nijenroode, with her husband Pieter Cnoll and family in Batavia in 1665, by Jacob Jansz. Coeman.

Cornelis van Nijenrode, also Cornelis van Nieuwroode (born Naarden; died Hirado, 31 January 1633), was a merchant employed by the VOC. He was from 1617 till 1622 governor in Ayutthaya (Siam) and governor of the VOC-trading post in Hirado, Japan from 1623 to 1633.

== Biography ==
Cornelis arrived in Asia in 1607. He filled several posts at Dutch East India Company-trading post in Siam. In 1622, he took part in an expedition, sent from Formosa, to the coast of China.

In Japan, Cornelis had a daughter, Cornelia, with a Japanese woman named Surishia, and a second daughter with a different Japanese woman; both children were acknowledged and provided for in his will.

Cornelis died in 1633, just before he was about to leave for Batavia.
