= Surakarta Sunanate =

Javanese monarchy

Sunanate of Surakarta Hadiningrat ꦑꦱꦸꦤꦤ꧀ꦤꦤ꧀ꦯꦸꦫꦏꦂꦠꦲꦢꦶꦤꦶꦁꦫꦠ꧀ Kasunanan Surakarta Hadiningrat
- Flag Royal Coat of Arms (Sri Radya Laksana)

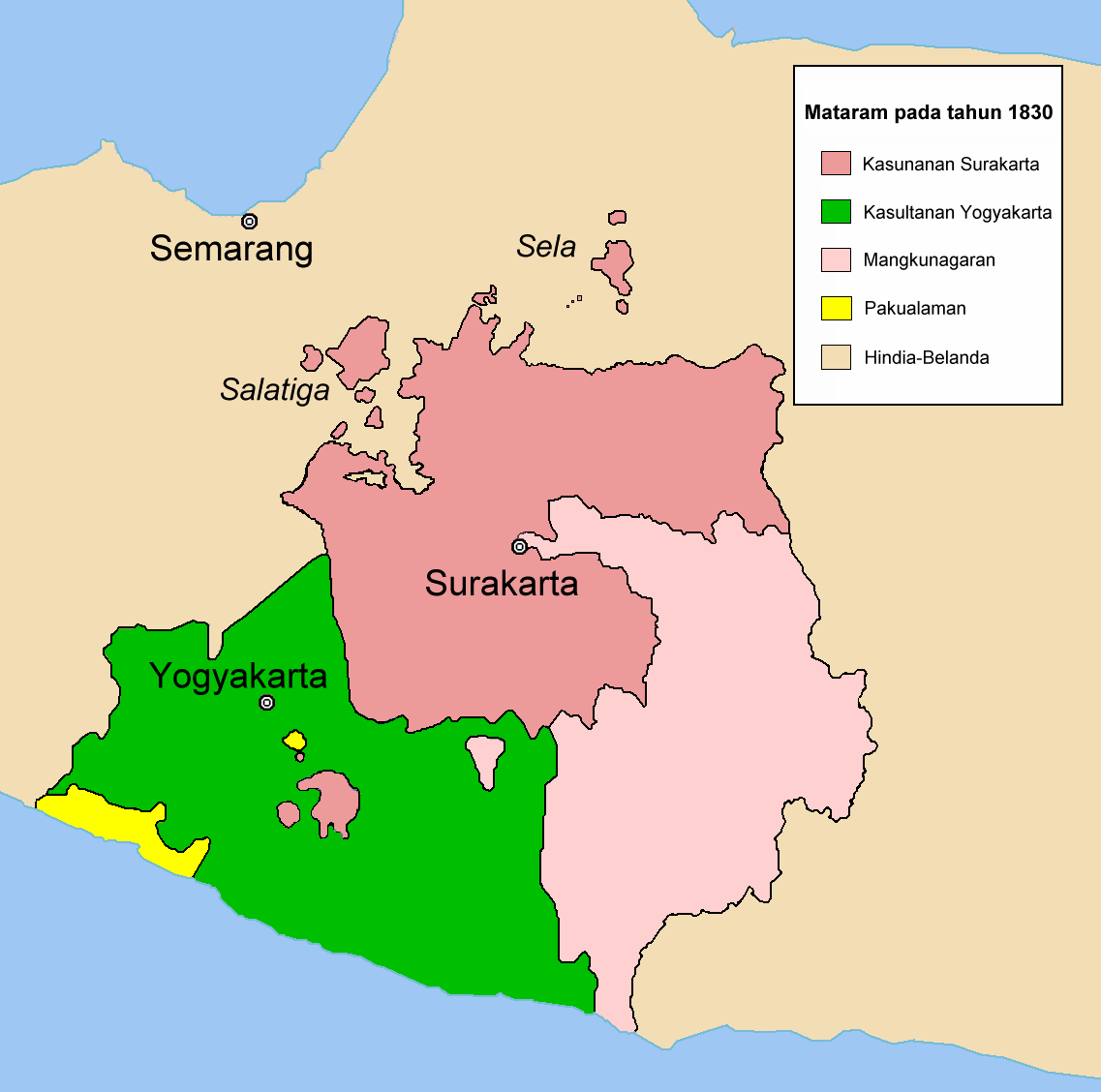
- The realm of Surakarta Sunanate (red) in 1830.
- Capital: Surakarta
- Official language: Javanese
- Recognised language: Indonesian (1945–present)
- Religion: Sunni Islam (official); Kejawen
- Government: Absolute monarchy (until 1945); Devolved semi-constitutional monarchy within unitary presidential republic (from 1945)
- Susuhunan
  - 1745–1749: Pakubuwana II
  - 1893–1939: Pakubuwana X
  - 1945–2004: Pakubuwana XII
  - 2004–2025: Pakubuwana XIII
  - 2025–present: Pakubuwana XIV
- Pepatih Dalem
  - 1745–1755 (first): Kanjeng Raden Adipati Pringgalaya
  - 1755 - 1769: Kanjeng Raden Adipati Mangkupraja I
  - 1769 - 1782: Kanjeng Raden Adipati Sasradiningrat I
  - 1782 - 1784: Kanjeng Raden Adipati Sindurêja
  - 1784 - 1792: Kanjeng Raden Adipati Jayaningrat
  - 1792 - 1804: Kanjeng Raden Adipati Mangkupraja II
  - 1804 - 1810: Kanjeng Raden Adipati Danuningrat
  - 1810 - 1812: Kanjeng Raden Adipati Cakranagara
  - 1812 - 1846: Kanjeng Raden Adipati Sasradiningrat II
  - 1846 - 1866: Kanjeng Raden Adipati Sasradiningrat III
  - 1866 - 1887: Kanjeng Raden Adipati Sasranagara
  - 1887 - 1889: Kanjeng Raden Adipati Mangunkusuma
  - 1889 - 1916: Kanjeng Raden Adipati Sasradiningrat IV
  - 1916 - 1939: Kanjeng Pangeran Arya Adipati Jayanagara
  - 1939 - 1945: Kanjeng Raden Mas Adipati Sasradiningrat V
- Legislature: Raad Bale Agung
- History
  - Hadeging Nagari Surakarta (establishment): 20 February 1745
  - Integration with Indonesia: 19 August 1945
Preceded by	Succeeded by
Mataram Sultanate	Special Region of Surakarta
- Today part of: Indonesia; Central Java
- Political Status: De facto independent state (1745–1800); De jure protectorate state of the Dutch East India Company (1749–1799); Protectorate state of the Batavian Republic within Dutch East Indies (1800–1806); Protectorate state of the British East India Company (1811–1816); Protectorate state of the Kingdom of the Netherlands within Dutch East Indies (1806–1811; 1816–1942); Protectorate state of the Empire of Japan (1942–1945); Protectorate state with special region status of the Republic of Indonesia (1945–1946); Non-sovereign monarchy within Republic of Indonesia (1946–present); Others: In some areas was established the Sultanate of Yogyakarta at 1755; In some areas was established the Duchy of Mangkunegaran at 1757

Surakarta Sunanate (Javanese: ꦟꦒꦫꦶꦑꦱꦸꦤꦤ꧀ꦤꦤ꧀ꦯꦸꦫꦏꦂꦠꦲꦢꦶꦤꦶꦁꦫꦠ꧀, romanized: Nagari Kasunanan Surakarta Hadiningrat; Indonesian: Kesunanan Surakarta) is a Javanese monarchy centred in the city of Surakarta, in the province of Central Java, Indonesia.

The Surakarta Kraton was established in 1745 by Pakubuwono II. Surakarta Sunanate and Yogyakarta Sultanate are together the successors of Mataram Sultanate. Unlike their counterparts in Yogyakarta, who use the title of sultan, the rulers of Surakarta use the title of sunan. The Dutch name was used during Dutch colonial rule until 1942. Notable Susuhunan that ruled this Sultanate are Pakubuwana VI, Pakubuwana X, and Pakubuwana XII. All of them are National Heroes of Indonesia.

== History ==
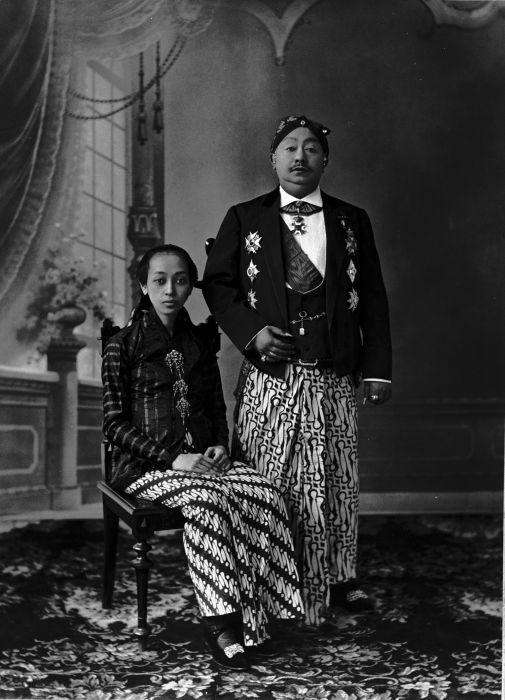
Susuhunan Pakubuwono X and his queen consort (c. 1920).

After the death of Sultan Agung I in 1645, the power and prestige of Sultanate of Mataram was declining due to a power struggle and conflict of succession within the royal family. The VOC (Dutch East India Company) exploited the power struggle to increase its control on Java, and manage to gain concessions of Mataram's former colony in Priangan and Semarang. The Mataram seat in Plered near Kotagede collapsed after the Trunojoyo revolt in 1677. Sunan Amral (Amangkurat II) relocated the palace to Kartasura. During the reign of Sunan Pakubuwono II, in 1742 Raden Mas Garendi (Sunan Kuning) led Chinese mercenaries and launched a revolt against the crown and also VOC. Raden Mas Garendi was the son of Prince Teposono and also the grandson of Amangkurat II. The rebels managed to take control of the Kartasura capital and ousted Pakubuwono II who fled and sought refuge in Ponorogo. With the help of Adipati Cakraningrat IV the ruler of western Madura, Pakubuwono II regained the capital and cracked down on the rebellion. However the palace of Kartasura was destroyed and considered inauspicious since the bloodbath took place there. Pakubuwono II decided to build a new palace and capital city in Sala (Solo) village. The transfer of the capital to Sala village is commemorated in chandrasengkala (chronogram) "Kombuling Pudya Kapyarsihing Nata" which corresponds to Wednesday 12 Sura 1670 Javanese year (20 February 1745). The date is considered the day that the Surakarta Sunanate was established.

Pakubuwono II faced numerous rebellions, among other from Raden Mas Said, and later from his own younger brother, Prince Mangkubumi who joined Mas Said's rebellion in 1746. Pakubuwono II died from illness in 1749, but before he died, he entrusted the royal affairs of Surakarta to his trusted protector, Baron von Hohendorff, a VOC officer. On behalf of the successor of Pakubuwono II, Pakubuwono III, the VOC manage to broker a peace negotiation with Prince Mangkubumi. The peace deal was reached with Mataram Sultanate being split in two based on the Treaty of Giyanti of 13 February 1755: Yogyakarta Sultanate under the rule of Prince Mangkubumi who was later stylised as Hamengkubuwono I and Surakarta Sunanate under Pakubuwono III.

The Giyanti Treaty named Pangeran Mangkubumi as Sultan of Yogyakarta. During the era of Dutch rule, there were recognised two main principalities of Vorstenlanden Mataram, the Surakarta Sunanate and The Yogyakarta Sultanate. Then a few years later Surakarta was divided further with the establishment of the Mangkunegaran Princedom after the Treaty of Salatiga (17 March 1757). The Mangkunegaran Duchy or Princedom was led by notorious rebel Raden Mas Said who was stylised as Mangkunegara I. The territory of Surakarta Sunanate were reduced much further after the Java War (1825–1830) led by Prince Diponegoro. Susuhunan Pakubuwono VI was alleged to have secretly supported Diponegoro's rebellion, and as punishment after the Java War the Sunanate was obliged to surrender much of its lands to the Dutch.

Throughout the Dutch East Indies era, the Sunanate of Surakarta enjoyed autonomous status under the Vorstenlanden Mataram arrangements. Together with the Sultanate of Yogyakarta, the Sunanate of Surakarta was considered as a vassal state of the Dutch Empire under royal patronage of Netherlands crown. The peak of the Surakarta Sunanate's prestige and power were during the reign of Pakubuwono X (1893–1939) when the Sunan renovated and enlarged the Surakarta palace and constructed many infrastructure projects and buildings in Surakarta city. The kingdom faced an era of strife and uncertainty during World War II and the Japanese occupation of the Dutch East Indies.

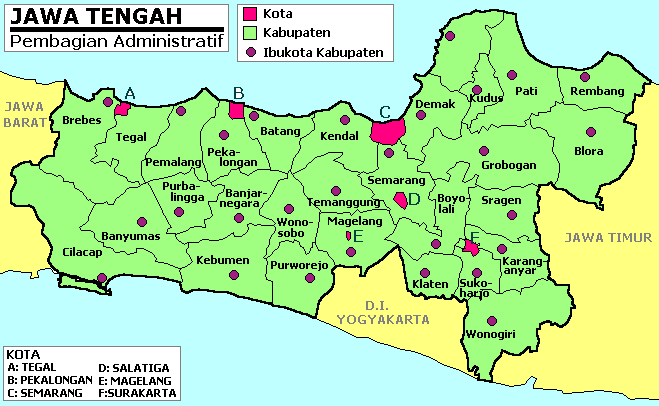
The Surakarta Sunanate today comprises Surakarta, Boyolali Regency, Klaten Regency, Sragen Regency, and Sukoharjo Regency (Karanganyar Regency and Wonogiri Regency was ruled by Mangkunegaran Duchy) within Central Java Province.

After the declaration of independence of the Republic of Indonesia on 17 August 1945, followed by Indonesian National Revolution, the Surakarta Sunanate with Mangkunegaran Princedom sent a letter of confidence to Sukarno to demonstrate their support for the Indonesian Republic. As the reward the Republic awarded the status of Daerah Istimewa (Special Region, similar to today Yogyakarta Sultanate) within the Republic of Indonesia. However, because the political agitation and opposition from Indonesian communists that led to an anti-monarchy movement and rebellion in early 1946, on 16 June 1946 the Indonesian Republic aborted the special region status; both Surakarta's and Mangkunegara's status were reduced to merely a residence and were later merged into Central Java province.

In contrast, the Yogyakarta Sultanate has successfully maintained special status. Yogyakarta's historical support and close ties with the founding fathers of the Indonesian Republic during the war of independence and Indonesian national revolution. The Surakarta Sunanate holds no actual political power. Its power is limited to royal prestige and its special position in sustaining traditional Javanese culture. The prestige still remains, that leading many leaders and political figures in Indonesia to seek affiliations with the Sunanate.

== Residences ==
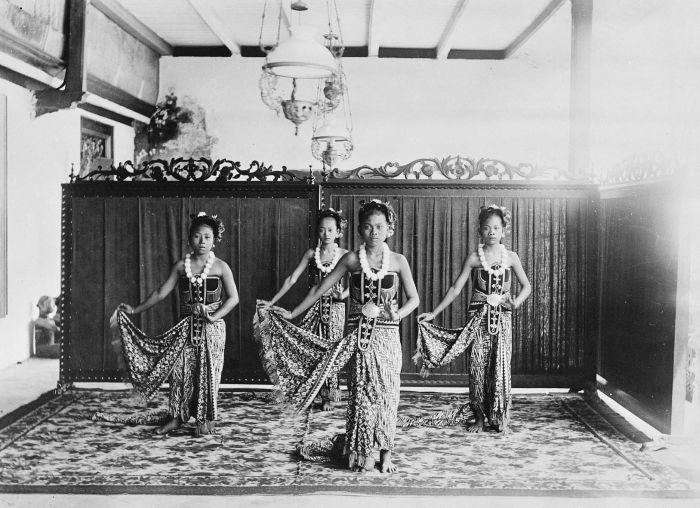
Serimpi dancers, circa 1910.

The principal residence of the Sunan is the kraton (palace), sometimes called the Surakarta Kraton or Kraton Solo but otherwise known in formal terms as Karaton Surakarta Hadiningrat. As is the case with a number of other kratons in various cities in Java, the Surakarta Kraton has become quite neglected over the years. Very little funding is available for maintenance, many parts of the palace have been in an advanced states of decay.

== List of sunans of Surakarta (1745–present) ==
This list is of ruling dates.

Name	Portrait	Birth	Marriage(s)	Death
Pakubuwana II; Raden Mas Gusti Prabasuyasa 17 February 1726 – 20 December 1749 (23 years, 307 days)		Kartasura; 8 December 1711 Son of Amangkurat IV	RAj Suwiyah/GKR Hemas	Surakarta; 24 March 1792 Aged 38 years, 12 days
Pakubuwana III; Raden Mas Gusti Suryadi 15 December 1749 – 26 September 1788 (56 years, 216 days)		Surakarta; 24 February 1732 Son of Pakubuwana II	RAj Wuku/GKR Kencana; Bk Rr Beruk/GKR Kencana	Surakarta; 26 September 1788 Aged 56 years, 215 days
Pakubuwana IV; Raden Mas Gusti Subadya 29 September 1788 – 2 October 1820 (32 years, 4 days)		Surakarta; 2 September 1768 Son of Pakubuwana III	RAj Handaya/KRAy Adipati Anom Hamengkunegara/GKR Kencana/GKR Pakubuwana; RAj Sakaptina/GKR Kencana/GKR Hageng	Surakarta; 2 October 1820 Aged 52 years, 30 days
Pakubuwana V Raden Mas Gusti Sugandi 10 October 1820 – 5 September 1823 (2 years, 331 days)		Surakarta; 13 December 1784 Son of Pakubuwana IV	GKR Hemas; GKR Kencana	Surakarta; 3 January 1828 Aged 38 years, 266 days
Pakubuwana VI; Bendara Raden Mas Sapardan 15 September 1823 – 28 March 1830 (6 years, 205 days)		Surakarta; 26 April 1807 Son of Pakubuwana V	GRAj Kusiyah/GKR Hemas/GKR Kencana/GKR Bendara/GKR Kedhaton; RAj Maknawiyah/RAy Sepuh/GKR Hemas/GKR Hageng; RAj Balênyik/RAy Anom/GKR Madurêtna; GKR Anom	Ambon; 2 April 1849 Aged 42 years, 37 days
Pakubuwana VII; Raden Mas Gusti Malik-i-Salikin 14 June 1830 – 10 May 1858 (27 years, 331 days)		Surakarta; 28 July 1796 Son of Pakubuwana IV	GKR Kencana; GKR Pakubuwana	Surakarta; 10 May 1858 Aged 61 years, 286 days
Pakubuwana VIII; Bendara Raden Mas Kusen 17 May 1858 – 28 December 1861 (3 years, 226 days)		Surakarta; 20 April 1789 Son of Pakubuwana IV	BRAj Ngaisah/BRAy Hangabehi/GKR Pakubuwana	Surakarta; 28 December 1861 Aged 72 years, 252 days
Pakubuwana IX; Gusti Raden Mas Duksina 30 December 1860 – 16 March 1893 (32 years, 77 days)		Surakarta; 22 December 1830 Son of Pakubuwana VI	BRAj Kustiyah/GKR Pakubuwana; R Larasati/RAy Adipati Mandayaprana/GKR Pakubuwana/GKR Madurêtna; 57 children	Surakarta; 16 March 1893 Aged 62 years, 84 days
Pakubuwana X Gusti Raden Mas Sayyidin Malik-ul-Kusna 30 March 1893 – 20 February 1939 (45 years, 328 days)		Surakarta; 29 November 1866 Son of Pakubuwana IX	GRAj Sumarti/GKR Pakubuwana; GRAj Mursudarinah/GKR Hemas	Surakarta; 20 February 1939 Aged 72 years, 83 days
Pakubuwana XI; Bendara Raden Mas Anantasena 26 April 1939 – 1 June 1945 (6 years, 67 days)		Surakarta; 1 February 1886 Son of Pakubuwana X	RAj Maryati/BRAy Hangabehi/GKR Kencana; RAj Kuspariyah/GKR Pakubuwana	Surakarta; 1 June 1945 Aged 59 years, 120 days
Pakubuwana XII; Gusti Raden Mas Surya Guritna 11 June 1945 – 11 June 2004 (59 years, 1 day)		Surakarta; 14 April 1925 Son of Pakubuwana XI	KRAy Pradapaningrum; KRAy Rêtnadiningrum; KRAy Mandayaningrum; KRAy Ragasmara; KRAy Kusumaningrum; KRAy Pujaningrum	Surakarta; 11 June 2004 Aged 79 years, 48 days
Pakubuwana XIII; Bendara Raden Mas Surya Partana 10 September 2004 – 2 November 2025 (21 years, 23 days)		Surakarta; 28 June 1948 Son of Pakubuwana XII	Nuk Kusumaningdyah/ KRAy Endang Kusumaningdyah; Winari Sri Haryani/KRAy Winari; Asih Winarni/KRAy Adipati Pradapaningsih/GKR Pakubuwana	Surakarta; 2 November 2025 Aged 77 years, 96 days

== See also ==
- Susuhunan of Surakarta, including list of Sunans
- List of monarchs of Java
