= Princely Highness =

(His) Princely Highness is the English rendering of (Zijne) Vorstelijke Hoogheid, a very rare style of address awarded by the colonial authorities of the Dutch East Indies (present Indonesia) to very few major Sultans on Java. The word Vorst at its root is ambivalent in Dutch, used for either a ruler of the low rank title equivalent to German Fürst or as generic term for ruler, never for a non-ruling prince of the blood.

Apparently the style reflected the equally rare status of Vorstenland 'princely land', which distinguished the Susuhunan (a higher, pre-Islamic title of this Sultan) of Surakarta (which also enjoyed the privilege of a 19-guns salute, who was explicitly granted the style, reportedly in the atrocious misspelling Zeine Vorstelijke Hoogheid, on 21 January 1932) and plausibly to the Sultan of Yogyakarta, two of the successor states to the Islamic Mataram Sultanate on Java, from the Gouvernementslanden '(colonial) government countries' to which all other Regentschappen (native princely states participating in indirect rule) belonged.

In 1725 the Holy Roman Emperor, Charles VI, along with the title of Prince of the Holy Roman Empire bestowed the style of Princely Highness to the Sicilian nobleman Don Giovanni VI Ventimiglia, marquess of Geraci.

- The same style, probably forged independently, has also been used by unhistorical 'princely houses' in fiction and micronations

== Sources ==
- Van Dale (the leading dictionary of the Dutch language)
