= Pieter Cnoll =

Dutch merchant

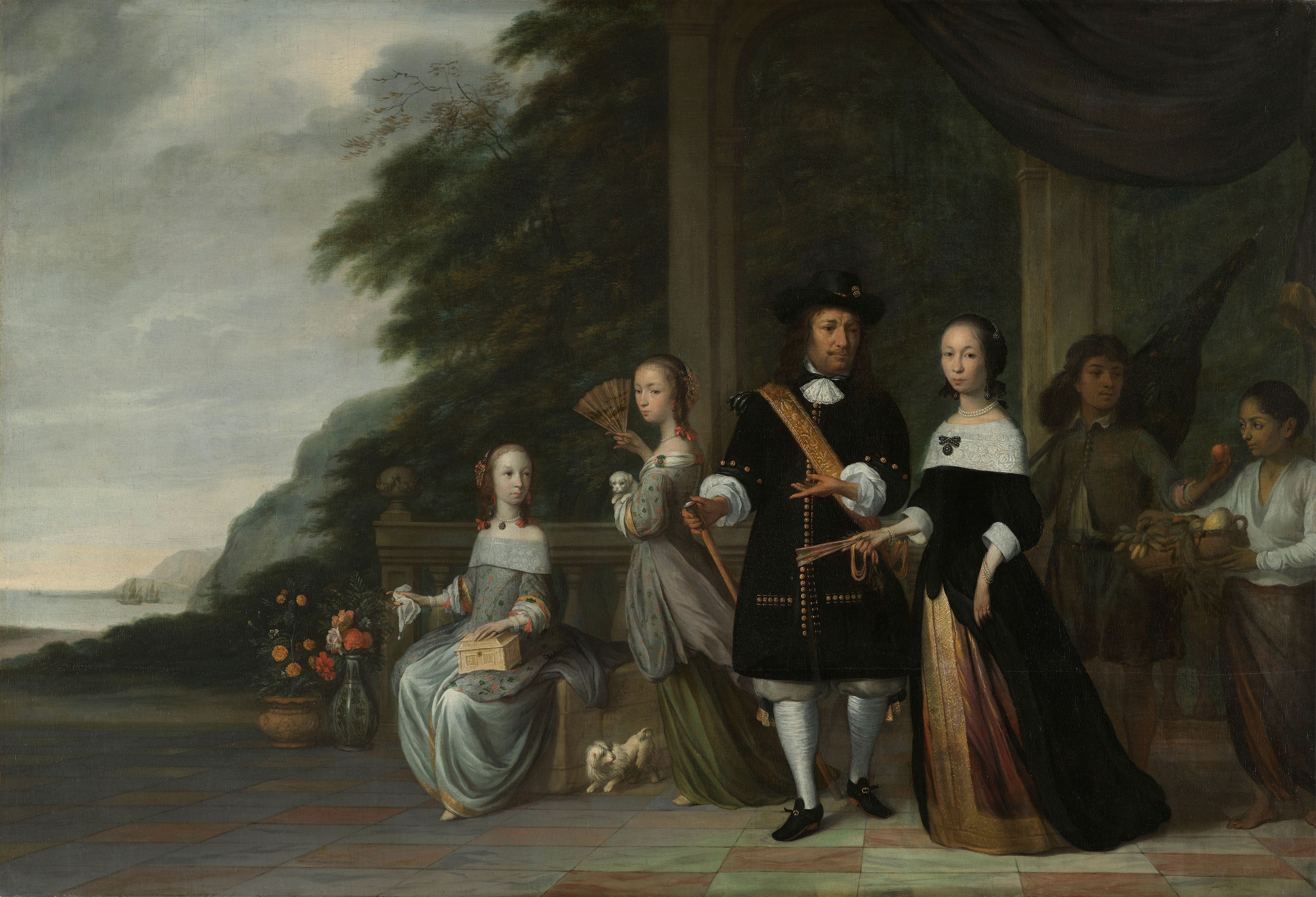
A 1665 portrait of Pieter Cnoll with his Eurasian wife Cornelia van Nijenroode and family by Jacob Jansz. Coeman.

Pieter Cnoll, also known as Pieter Knoll (d. 1672), was a Dutch merchant who was employed by the United East India Company (VOC). Cnoll, who was born in Amsterdam, joined the VOC's accounting department at some point before 1647 and was sent to the East Indies to work as a clerk in Batavia at the city castle. He soon rose to the rank of junior merchant and in 1652 married Cornelia van Nijenroode, an Indo businesswoman who was the daughter of Cornelis van Nijenroode, a VOC opperhoofden in Japan. In 1665, artist Jacob Jansz. Coeman painted a portrait of Cnoll's family and enslaved servants.

Together, Cnoll and his wife had ten children, with only one surviving to adulthood, a son. Cnoll died in 1672, and left his entire estate in his last will and testament to van Nijenroode. In 1675, she remarried to a Dutchman named Johann Bitter at the age of 46, but the marriage was an unhappy one and she filed for divorce not soon after. She died in 1692 in the Dutch Republic, where she had travelled to in order to secure the divorce from the appropriate authorities. One of the fifty slaves Cnoll owned was an Indonesian man named Untung Surapati, who was possibly featured in Coeman's 1665 portrait.
