= Pakubuwono I of Mataram =

Sultan of Mataram, 1704–1719

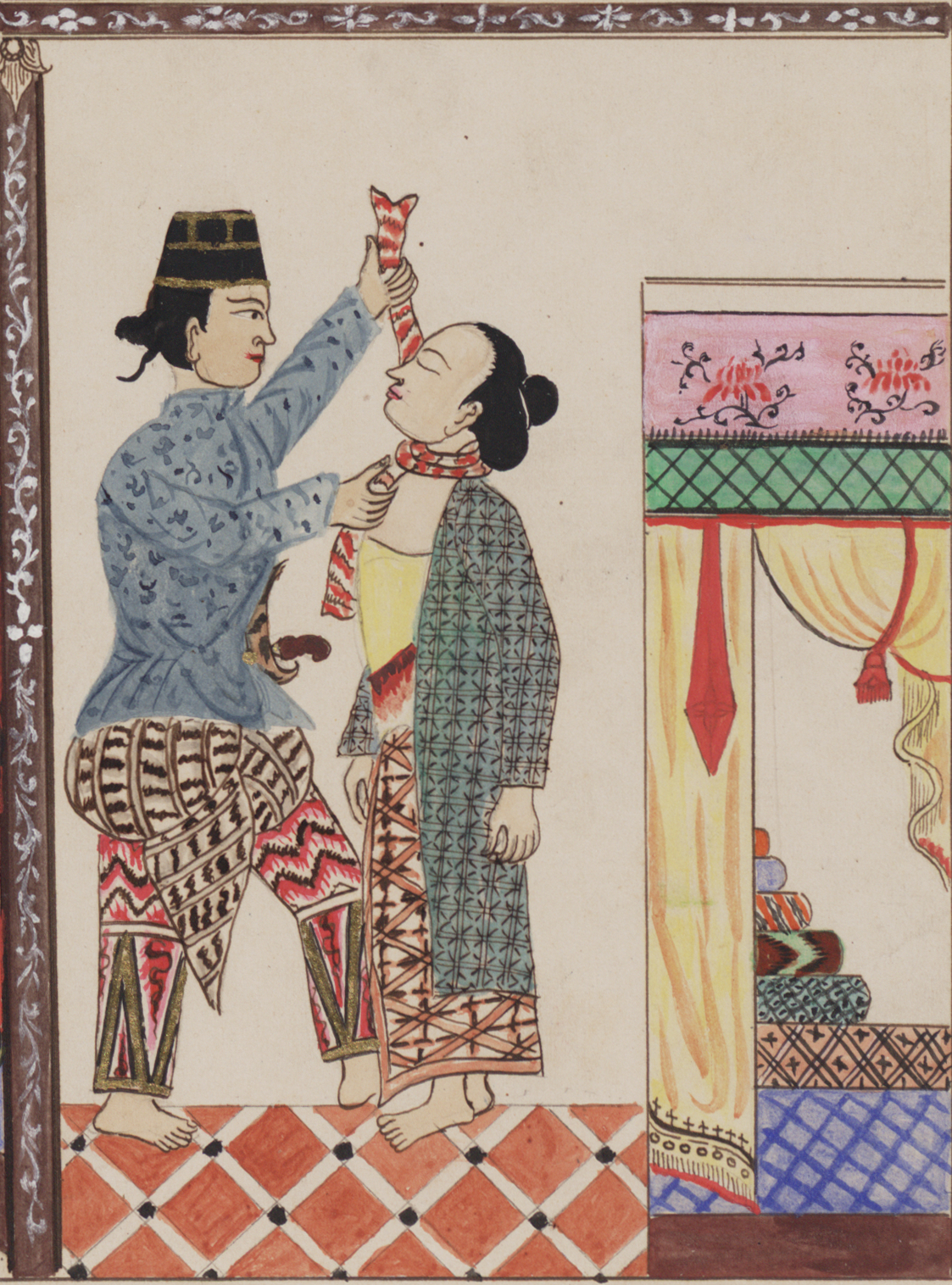
- Pakubuwana I was forced to execute his daughter, Raden Ayu Lembah, on the orders of Amangkurat III.

Susuhunan of Mataram
- Reign: 1705–1719
- Coronation: September 1705
- Predecessor: Amangkurat III
- Successor: Amangkurat IV
- Born: Raden Mas Darajat ca. 1648; Plered Palace, Plered, Mataram Sultanate
- Died: 22 February 1719; Kartasura Palace, Kartasura, Mataram Sultanate
- Burial: Pakubuwanan Tomb, Imogiri Royal Cemetery, Imogiri, Mataram Sultanate
- Spouse: Gusti Kanjeng Ratu Pakubuwana (Ratu Mas Blitar)
- Issue: Amangkurat IV
Regnal name
- Sampeyan Dalem Ingkang Sinuhun Kanjeng Susuhunan Prabu Pakubuwana Senapati ing Ngalaga Abdurrahman Sayyidin Panatagama Ingkang Jumeneng Kaping I
- House: Mataram
- Father: Amangkurat I
- Mother: Kanjeng Ratu Wetan

Pakubuwono I (also known as Pakubuwana I, known prior to his reign as Pangeran Puger, lit. 'Prince Puger'), was a combatant for the succession of the Mataram Sultanate, both as a co-belligerent during the Trunajaya rebellion (1677–1681), and the First Javanese War of Succession (1704–1707).

An uncle of Amangkurat III of Mataram, he created a new name for his line, with the title Pakubuwono, the standard name for rulers of the subsequently created Surakarta. Most Javanese chronicles (Javanese: babad) depict him as a great wise ruler. He ruled from 1705 to 1719.

His son succeeded him with the title Amangkurat IV.

== Origin ==
Born as Raden Mas Darajat, he was the son of Amangkurat I, the last Mataram ruler based in Plered, from his second queen consort, Ratu Wetan. Ratu Wetan originated from the Kajoran family, descended from the Sultans of Pajang.

RM. Darajat was once appointed as a crown prince (Javanese: adipati anom) when a conflict between his father and Raden Mas Rahmat (later Amangkurat II of Mataram) occurred. RM. Rahmat was Prince Puger's half-brother, born in Ratu Kulon (the first queen consort of Amangkurat I). Amangkurat I relinquished the crown prince title from RM. Rahmat and ceded it to RM. Darajat. However, when the Kajoran family was proven to support the Trunajaya rebellion in 1674, Amangkurat I was forced to draw the title from RM. Darajat.

== Defending Plered ==
The peak of the Trunajaya rebellion took place in 1677. This Madurese prince made a great invasion of Plered, the capital of Mataram. Amangkurat I escaped to the west and assigned RM. Rahmat to defend the palace. But, RM. Rahmat refused and chose to evacuate as well. Prince Puger appeared to replace his half-brother to prove to his father that not all of Kajoran's family members were involved in the Trunajaya rebellion.

When Trunajaya troops came to Plered Palace, Amangkurat I had evacuated. Prince Puger stood against them. But, the enemy's strength was too great, so he was forced to escape to Jenar village (now in Purwodadi, Purworejo). Prince Puger built a new palace namely Purwakanda there and appointed himself as a king-styled Susuhunan Ingalaga.

Trunajaya plundered Mataram heirlooms. He subsequently moved to his post in Kediri. Meanwhile, Sunan Ingalaga came back to Plered to destroy the remaining Trunajaya's followers placed there. Sunan Ingalaga then appointed himself as a new Mataram ruler.

== Defeated by Amangkurat II ==
In the meantime, Amangkurat I had died while escaping to Tegal. RM. Rahmat was appointed as the new ruler of Mataram, styled Amangkurat II. As his father's will, Amangkurat II requested the Dutch East India Company for help. The Trunajaya rebellion was eventually suppressed at the end of 1679.

Amangkurat II was a king without a palace because Plered had been occupied by Sunan Ingalaga, his half-brother. He built a new palace in Wanakerta forest, later renamed to Kartasura, in September 1680. Amangkurat II then summoned Sunan Ingalaga to join with him, but Sunan Ingalaga turned it down.

The refusal caused a civil war. Eventually, on 28 November 1681, Sunan Ingalaga surrendered to Jacob Couper, a Dutch officer who helped Amangkurat II. Sunan Ingalaga himself was titled Prince Puger again and recognized his half-brother's rule Amangkurat II.

The defeat of Prince Puger marked the end of the Mataram Sultanate which became vassal of Sunanate of Surakarta. Despite that, Javanese chronicles still praise Prince Puger's existence as an ordinary man in Kartasura. The king was indeed Amangkurat II, but the government of Sunanate was controlled by Prince Puger. It is understandable because the Javanese chronicles were written in the era of Prince Puger-descended rulers.

== Death of Captain Tack ==
Amangkurat II successfully ascended to the throne because of Dutch assistance, but accompanied by a treaty that worsened the Kartasura-based Mataram Sultanate. When the situation was conducive, the anti-Dutch Patih Nerangkusuma persuaded him to betray the treaty.

In 1685, Amangkurat II protected a Dutch fugitive namely Untung Suropati. Captain François Tack arrived in Kartasura to arrest him. Amangkurat II pretended to help the Dutch East India Company. But, he secretly tasked Prince Puger to be disguised as Untung Suropati's follower.

In a bitter fight that took place around Kartasura Palace in February 1686, the 75-man Dutch troops were killed by Untung Surapati's troops, including Captain Tack who was unable to go down from his horse.

== Expelled from Kartasura ==
Amangkurat II died in 1703 and was succeeded by his son Amangkurat III, a king disliked by many people due to his bad attitude, so there was much support for Prince Puger. The relationship between uncle and nephew is strained. Amangkurat III's hostility toward his half-uncle severed when Raden Suryokusumo, son of Prince Puger, rebelled.

The hostility culminated in May 1704, when Amangkurat III sent troops to exterminate Prince Puger's family. But, he and his followers successfully escaped. The one tasked to chase was Duke Jangrana II, Regent of Surabaya. But Duke Jangrana II secretly supported Prince Puger, so his pursuit was no more than a drama.

Rangga Yudanegara, Regent of Semarang, acted as a mediator of Prince Puger in requesting the Dutch East India Company for help. Yudanegara's diplomacy skills successfully made the Dutch East India Company forgive Captain Tack's death. They were prepared to help Prince Puger's struggle with some conditions beneficial to them.

The content of the Semarang Treaty which had to be signed by Prince Puger is, among others, the transfer of Eastern Madura to the Dutch East India Company.

== Kartasura occupation ==
On 6 July 1704, Prince Puger was appointed as a ruler styled Susuhunan Paku Buwana Senapati Ingalaga Ngabdurahman Sayidin Panatagama Khalifatulah Tanah Jawa, commonly abbreviated as Pakubuwana or Pakubuwono I.

One year later, Pakubuwono I, guarded by joint Dutch, Semarang, Western Madura, and Surabaya troops, moved to invade Kartasura. Kartasura troops assigned to ambush them were led by Arya Mataram, Pakubuwono I's own younger brother. Arya Mataram successfully persuaded Amangkurat III to evacuate to the east, when he joined with Pakubuwono I.

The throne of Kartasura thus fell to Pakubuwono I's hand, exactly on 17 September 1705.

== Rule ==
The rule of Pakubuwono I was brought up to a new treaty with the Dutch East India Company as a replacement ever signed by Amangkurat II. The old treaty stipulated that Kartasura was obliged to pay Trunajaya war costs for 4.5 million guilders, and the new one stipulated that Kartasura was obliged to send 13,000 tons of rice per year for 25 years.

In 1706, joined Kartasura and Dutch troops running after Amangkurat III who sought protection in Pasuruan. In a battle in Bangil, Untung Suropati, the then Regent of Pasuruan, was killed in action. Amangkurat III himself surrendered in Surabaya in 1708, and was later exiled to Dutch Ceylon (now Sri Lanka).

One year later, Pakubuwono I was forced to sentence Duke Jangrana II of Surabaya, who previously helped him to ascend the throne, to death, on the ground that the Dutch East India Company found proof that Duke Jangrana II committed treason in the First Javanese War of Succession in 1706.

Jangrana II was succeeded by his brother, Jayapuspita, as Regent of Surabaya. In 1714, Jayapuspita refused to appear before Pakubuwono I and prepared for rebellion. 3 years later, joined Kartasura and Dutch troops invaded Surabaya. According to Babad Tanah Jawi, this new battle is more horrible than in Pasuruan. Jayapuspita was eventually defeated and retreated to Japan (now Mojokerto) in 1718.

== Later life ==
Sunan Pakubuwono I died in 1719, and was succeeded by his son, Amangkurat IV, whose reign was marked by the Second Javanese War of Succession.

== Family ==
Personal name	Title and style(s)	Notes
By Queen Consort, Gusti Kanjeng Ratu Pakubuwana
	Raden Ayu Timur	Married Pangeran Mangkubumi
Raden Mas Suryaputra	Raden Wangsataruna; Pangeran Adipati Anom; Amangkurat IV	
Raden Mas Săngka	Pangeran Arya Purbaya	
Raden Mas Sudama	Pangeran Arya Balitar	
By concubine, Raden Ajeng Sendhi
Raden Ajeng Lembah		Married Amangkurat III
By concubine, Mas Ayu Tejawati
Raden Mas Teja, Raden Mas Sudira	Pangeran Ngabei	
Raden Mas Papak	Raden Natawirya; Raden Dipataruna; Pangeran Arya Dipanagara	
Raden Mas Koda	Raden Kartataruna; Pangeran Arya Upasanta	
By concubine, Mas Ayu Citrawati
Raden Mas Kawa	Raden Wiryataruna; Pangeran Arya Prangwadana	
By concubine, Mas Ayu Pujawati
Raden Mas Mesir	Raden Martataruna; Pangeran Arya Dipasanta	
Raden Ajeng Lêngis	Kanjeng Ratu Madurêtna (Ratu Ayunan)	Married Cakraningrat of Madura
By concubine, Rêtnawati
Raden Ajeng Impun	Kanjeng Ratu Mas	Married to : Amangkurat III; Pangeran Pringgalaya; Pangeran Suranagara; Adipati Sindureja
By concubine, Mas Ayu Candrawati
Raden Ajeng Manis	Raden Ayu Suranagara	Married Pangeran Suranagara

Preceded by Amangkurat III	Susuhunan of Mataram; 1704 – 1719	Succeeded by Amangkurat IV
