= Amangkurat III of Mataram =

Ruler of Mataram (1703–1705)

- Sunan Mas
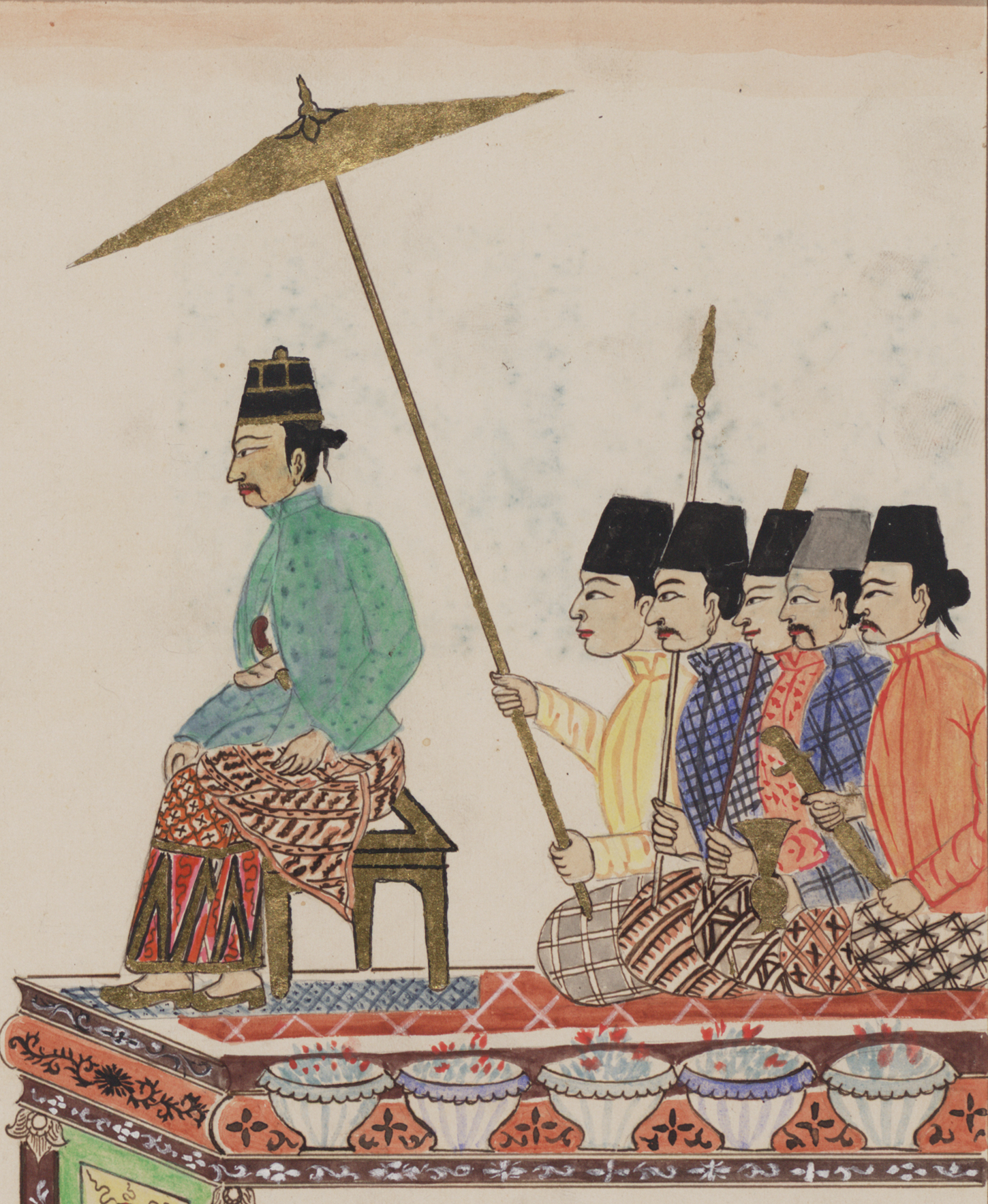

Susuhunan of Mataram
- Reign: 1703 – 1705
- Predecessor: Amangkurat II
- Successor: Pakubuwana I
- Born: Raden Mas Sutikna
- Died: 1734; Dutch Ceylon
Regnal name
- Sampeyan Dalem Ingkang Sinuhun Kanjeng Susuhunan Prabu Amangkurat Senapati ing Ngalaga Abdurrahman Sayyidin Panatagama Khalifatullah Ingkang Jumeneng Kaping III
- House: Mataram
- Father: Amangkurat II

Amangkurat III (Amangkurat Mas; died in Dutch Ceylon (now Sri Lanka), 1734) was a short-lived susuhunan (ruler) of the Sultanate of Mataram, who reigned 1703–1705.

When his father Amangkurat II of Mataram died, he soon lost his half-uncle Prince Puger in the First Javanese War of Succession, which lasted for five years until the Dutch managed to install Prince Puger as Pakubuwono I. Amangkurat was deposed, but not caught until 1707. He was subsequently exiled to Ceylon, where he died some three decades after his ouster from power.

== Origin ==
Born as Raden Mas Sutikna, according to the Babad Tanah Jawi, he was the only child of Amangkurat II, as his mother had used magic on another of Amangkurat II's wives to make them unable to conceive of child. Sutikna was also nicknamed Pangeran Kencet (Prince Heel), due to the deformity in his heel.

It is said that Sutikna was bad-tempered, temperamental, and a jealous man, especially if he knew there was another more handsome man. When acting as adipati anom (crown prince), he married his cousin, Raden Ayu Lembah, daughter of Prince Puger (future Pakubuwono I). Nevertheless, he divorced his wife due to her infidelity with Raden Sukra, son of Patih Sindureja. Raden Sukra was then murdered by Sutikna's bodyguard, and Prince Puger was forced to put capital punishment on her daughter, Lembah. Sutikna then married Raden Ayu Himpun, sister of Lembah.

== Conflict with Prince Puger ==
Amangkurat III ascended to the throne in Kartasura, succeeding his father Amangkurat II who died in 1703. According to the Babad Tanah Jawi, the wahyu keprabon (heavenly mandate) fell on Prince Puger. The latter was supported by numerous officials who disliked the new king, which disturbed Amangkurat III. He divorced Himpun and took a wife from Onje village (now in Mrebet, Purbalingga Regency) as his new queen consort.

Pressure from his family caused Raden Suryokusumo (son of Prince Puger) to rebel. The feared Amangkurat III immediately placed Prince Puger and his family in captivity. They were released after persuasion by Patih Sumabrata. Support by Prince Puger to seize power began again. Amangkurat III ultimately sent his followers to assassinate Prince Puger and his family in 1704, but the target had escaped to Semarang.

== Leaving Kartasura ==
Prince Puger in Semarang was supported by the Dutch East India Company (VOC), with condition that was beneficial to the latter. He designated himself as sultan, styled Pakubuwono I. His troops moved in 1705 to seize Kartasura. Amangkurat III built fortifications in Ungaran, led by his uncle, Prince Arya Mataram, who secretly supported Pakubuwono I.

Arya Mataram was successful in persuading Amangkurat III to leave Kartasura. He eventually joined Pakubuwono I, his own older brother.

This short-lived reign of Amangkurat III was the result of Amangkurat I's curse on Amangkurat II, who the latter had poisoned the drink of his father when escaping from Mataram due to the Trunajaya rebellion in 1677.

According to the Babad Tanah Jawi, Amangkurat II was cursed on the condition that his descendants who would become kings, except for one, would rule only for a short period. The Babad Tanah Jawi was, however, written in the era of Pakubuwono I's descendants, thus its accuracy is difficult to prove.

== First Javanese War of Succession ==
Amangkurat III's group escaped to Ponorogo bringing all royal heirlooms. There, he tortured Duke Martowongso, but only due to a misunderstanding. All the people from Ponorogo rebelled after their regent was tortured. Amangkurat III then escaped to Madiun, after which he escaped to Kediri.

Untung Suropati, an anti-Dutch Regent of Pasuruan immediately sent troops to protect Amangkurat III. Troops of the Dutch as well as of the people of Kartasura, Madura, and Surabaya moved to invade Pasuruan in 1706. During a battle in Bangil, Untung Suropati was killed in action and his sons then joined with Amangkurat III in Malang.

Amangkurat III had suffered much in 1707 because he was chased by Pakubuwono I's troops. Amangkurat III subsequently moved to Blitar, then to Kediri, and ultimately decided to surrender in Surabaya in 1708.

== Exiled to Ceylon ==
Prince Blitar, son of Pakubuwono I, arrived in Surabaya and persuaded Amangkurat III to hand over all royal heirlooms, but he refused. Amangkurat III was only willing to give it directly to Pakubuwono I.

The Dutch East India Company then moved Amangkurat III to Batavia (now Jakarta), after which he was banished to Ceylon. Amangkurat III died there 26 years later.

It is said that the Mataram royal heirlooms had been brought to Ceylon. But Pakubuwono I tried to be resolute by announcing that the actual Javanese heirlooms were in the Demak Great Mosque and the tomb of Sunan Kalijaga in Kadilangu, Demak.

Preceded by Amangkurat II	Susuhunan of Mataram; 1703 – 1705	Succeeded by Pakubuwono I
