= Invasion of Java =

Invasion of Java may refer to:

- Mongol invasion of Java (1293)
- British invasion of Java (1811)
- Japanese invasion of Java (1942)
