= Cornelia van Nijenroode =

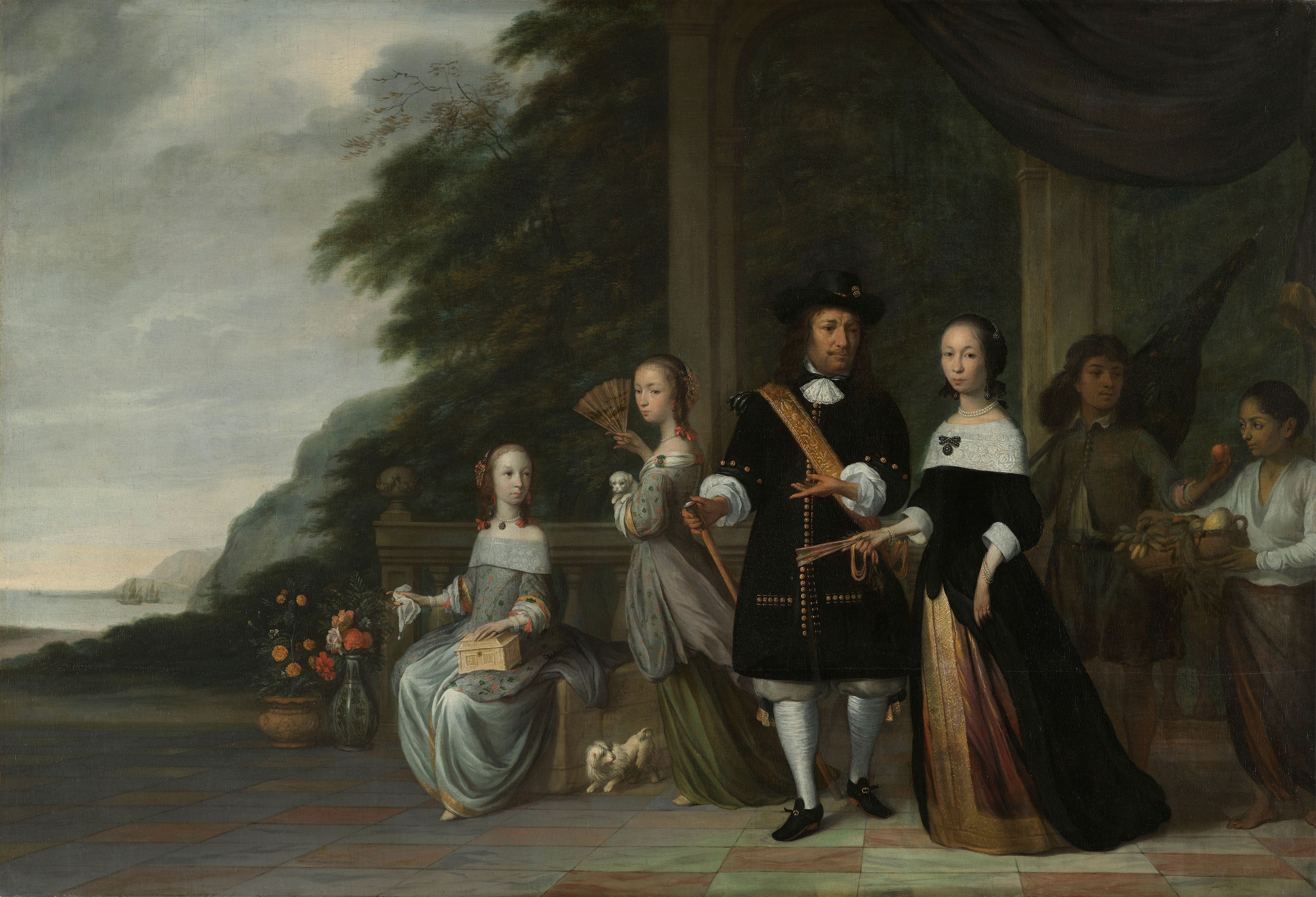
Portrait of Cornelia van Nijenroode and Pieter Cnoll, 1665, by Jacob Jansz. Coeman

Cornelia van Nijenroode (c. 1629 – c. 1692) was a Dutch merchant in the Dutch East Indies, famous for her conflict with her second husband.

== Life ==
Van Nijenroode was born in Hirado, Japan, to Cornelis van Nijenroode (d. 1633), the manager of the Dutch trade station at Hirado, and his Japanese concubine Surishia. She was married in 1652 in Batavia to Pieter Cnoll (d. 1672), manager of trade in Batavia, and in 1676 in Batavia to Johan Bitter (1638–1714), councilor of the legal court of Batavia.

She was taken to Batavia with her sister Hester after the death of their father, despite the fact that their mother was still alive, to receive a Christian education. At the death of her first husband, she had become a successful and wealthy merchant. Through her unhappy second marriage, she lost the right to manage her own property and business to her spouse, who wished to control her finances, which caused a severe conflict. Johan Bitter returned to the Netherlands in 1680, but returned as a councilor of the legal court in 1683, and their conflict over the control of her fortune caused such a public scandal that they were both exiled from the colony by the governor Johannes Camphuys in 1688. In the Netherlands, the court rules that she must hand over her property to her husband, but, as her fortune was not accounted for, the matter was still unresolved at her death.

Van Nijenroode died around 1692.

== Legacy ==
She has been referred to as a typical example of the independent Eurasian women of the Dutch colonial empire.

She is the subject of Leonard Blussé's Bitter Bonds: A Colonial Divorce Drama of the Seventeenth Century.
