= Jacob Jansz. Coeman =

Dutch painter

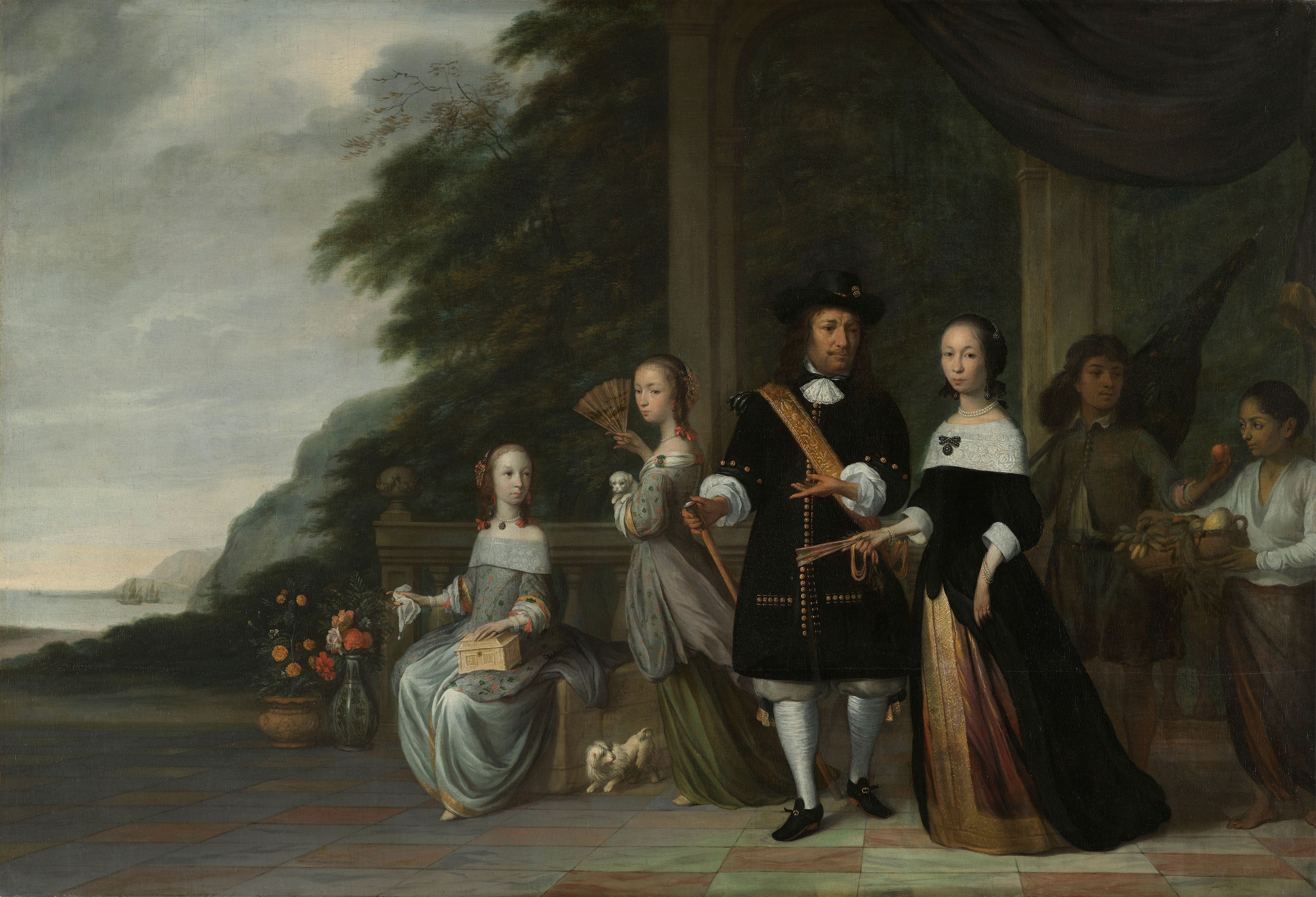
1665 portrait of Pieter Cnoll with his Eurasian wife Cornelia van Nijenroode and their daughters by Jacob Jansz. Coeman, Rijksmuseum

Jacob Jansz. Coeman (Amsterdam? ca 1632- 9 April 1676, Batavia, Dutch East Indies) was a Dutch painter of portraits. Coeman worked in the style of Thomas de Keyser.

In 1655 he married Hester Wils, either from Haarlem or Den Briel. His father lived in Kalverstraat and was a supervisor in the schutterij. The couple had two children. In 1663 he left for Batavia. Besides Joan Maetsuycker and Johan Bax van Herenthals he famously painted a portrait of Pieter Cnoll with his half Japanese wife Cornelia van Nijenroode and his family in Batavia.
