= Kartasura =

District in Sukoharjo Regency, Central Java, Indonesia

Kartasura ꦏꦂꦠꦱꦸꦫ (Javanese)
- District (Kecamatan)
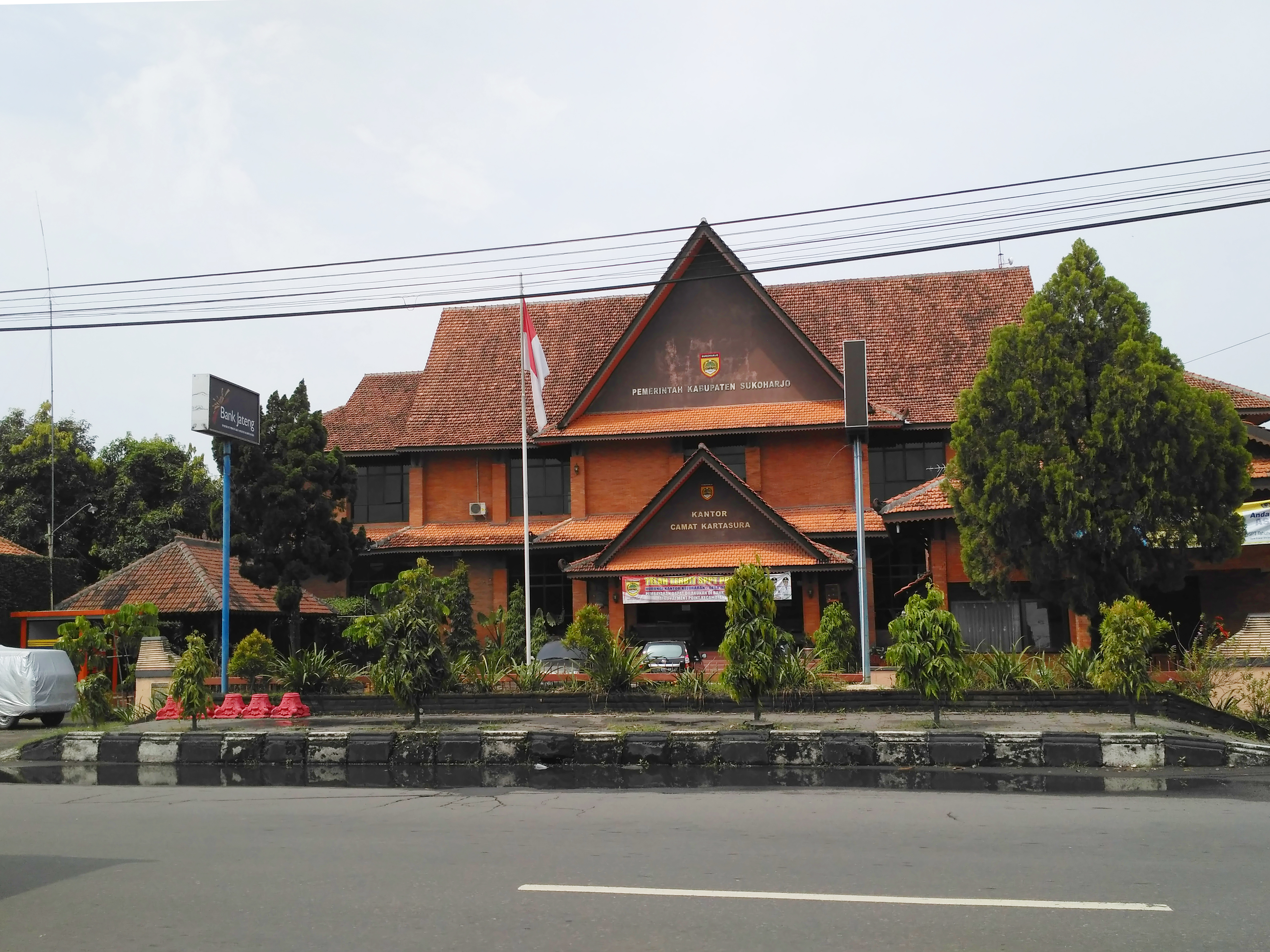
- Kartasura district office

- Location in Java
- Country: Indonesia
- Region: Java
- Province: Central Java
- Regency: Sukoharjo

Kartasura (Javanese: ꦏꦂꦠꦱꦸꦫ, also spelled Kartosuro) is a district (kecamatan) in Sukoharjo Regency, Central Java, Indonesia. Kartasura is considered Surakarta's satellite city and a junction of highways to Yogyakarta and Semarang. It can be reached within minutes southward of Surakarta's Adisoemarmo International Airport.

== History ==
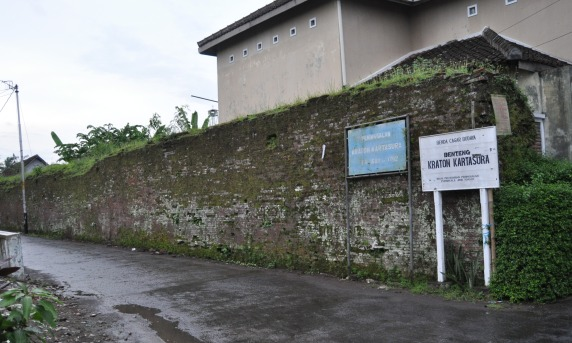
Remaining wall from the Kartasura palace

In the seventeenth century Kartasura was the capital of the Sultanate of Mataram between 1680 and 1755. This time period is commonly referred to as the Kartasura era or period of the Mataram sultanate—it preceded the transfer to Surakarta by Pakubuwana II.

There were considerable problems for the sultanate in this era:

- A difficult relationship with the Dutch East India Company (VOC)
- The issues of succession, such as the Treaty of Giyanti (1755)
- The Geger Pecinan, a Chinese rebellion which that burnt the palace (1743)

== Heritage sites ==
There are 2 palace sites, Kartasura Palace in Kartasura District (kelurahan) and Pajang Palace ruin in Makamhaji District.
