= Astana Pajimatan Himagiri =

Royal graveyard in Yogyakarta, Indonesia

Coordinates: 7°55′S 110°23′E

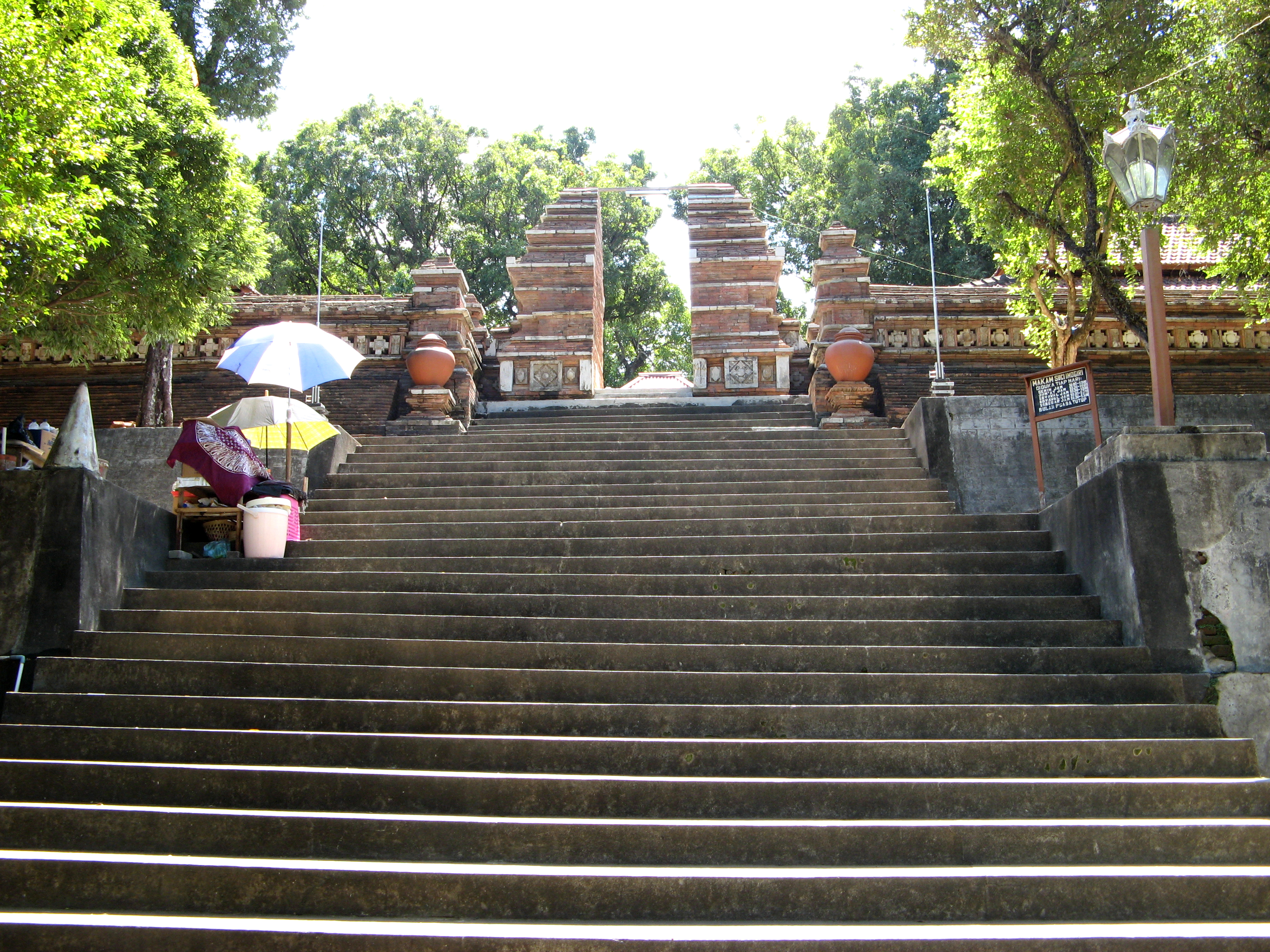
Image of Imogiri split gate, at the entrance to the graveyard

Astana Pajimatan Himagiri, also known simply as Imogiri (Javanese: ꦲꦶꦩꦒꦶꦫꦶ; or Imagiri in standard Javanese romanisation) is a royal graveyard complex in the Special Region of Yogyakarta, in south-central Java, Indonesia, in the Imogiri subdistrict under the administration of Bantul Regency. Imogiri is the traditional resting place for the royalty of central Java, including many rulers of the Sultanate of Mataram and the current houses of Surakarta and Yogyakarta Sultanate. The name imagiri or imogiri was derived from Sanskrit Himagiri, meaning 'mountain of snow'.

The site's most prominent graves are that of the early Mataram ruler Sultan Agung, and Sultan of Yogyakarta Hamengkubuwono IX, a leader during Indonesia's war for independence. The most recent is that of Pakubuwana XIII of Surakarta who was buried on November 5, 2025.

== History ==
Preceded by the tomb complex of Kota Gede, Imogiri was constructed by Sultan Agung of Mataram in the later years of his reign, probably in the 1640s.

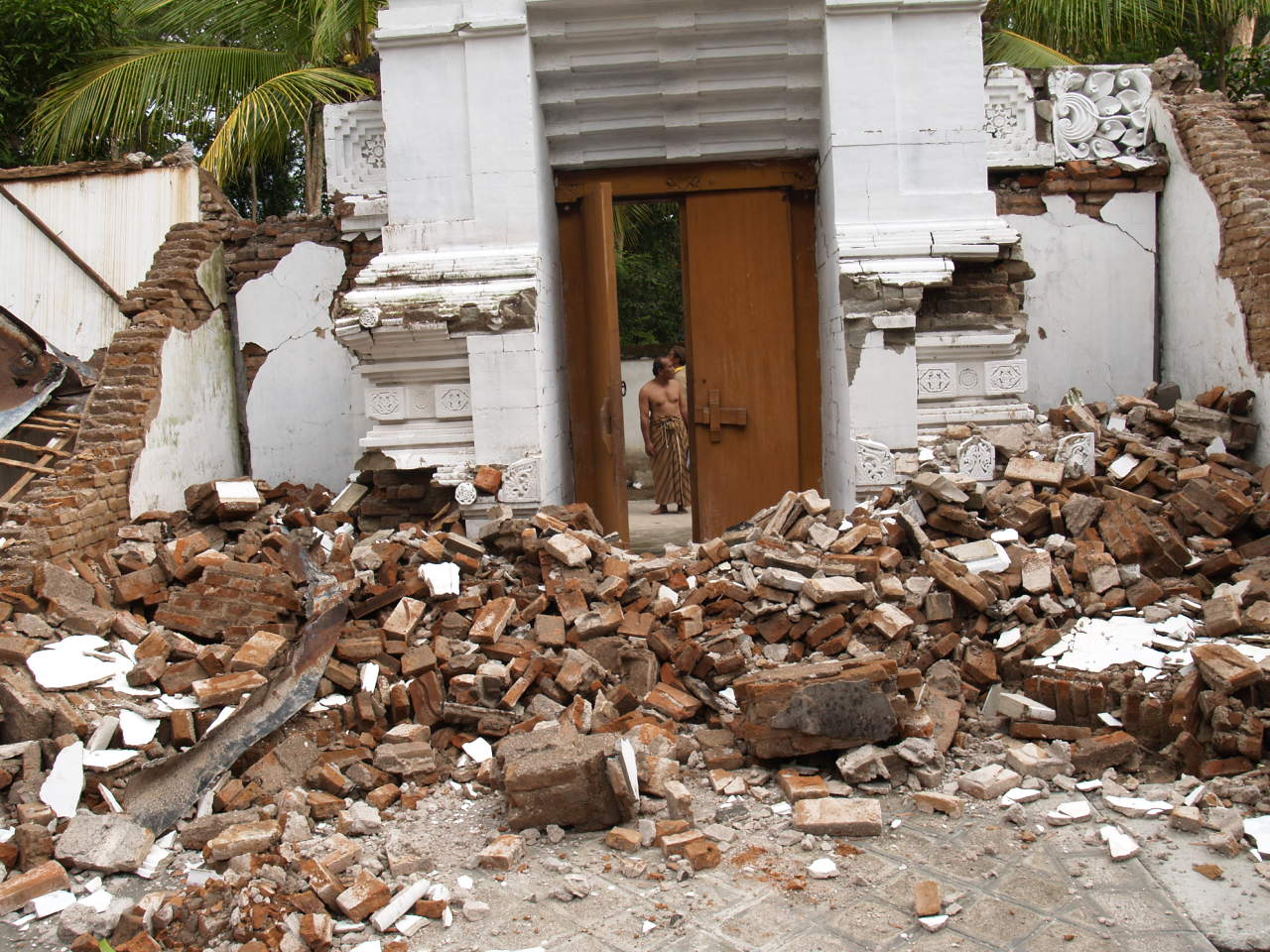
After the earthquake of 2006

=== Renovations ===
The Imogiri complex has had ongoing renovations since initial construction, due to exposure to tropical rain and weather, most materials at the graveyard require continual upkeep. Pakubuwono X during his reign spent a large amount of money on upgrading the Juru Kunci administration buildings in Imogiri village, the funerary mosque at the foot of the stairs, the stairs, and the Graveyard in general. He also constructed the Girimulya section as well. Hamengkubuwana VIII in during the construction of Saptorenggo in the 1920s also conducted repairs on the earlier structures that required repairs. Various Suharto-era bureaucrats and army personnel with connections with branches of earlier rulers contributed to several roof renewals and other renovations. The Indonesian Government contributed to a project that rehabilitated the yard known by its split gate – the Supit Urang – under the auspices of the archaeology service and appropriate agencies in the 1980s. In the 1990s the main gate into Sultan Agungan also required repairs.

The 2006 earthquake in the region saw considerable damage to the complex. Extensive repairs were carried out, soon after the event.

== Religious significance ==
The graveyard is a significant pilgrimage ziarah site, particularly on significant dates in the Javanese calendar (such as Satu Suro, New Year's Day), and the Islamic calendar.

It also belongs to a larger network of significant locations in Javanese pilgrimage traditions. It is possibly the only major location remaining in Java where the Palaces of Surakarta and Yogyakarta have personnel working at a jointly administered royal graveyard.

Folklore collected by Pranata in the 1970s suggests that unusual stones in the steps preceding Sultan Agung's section of the graveyard cover the remains of Jan Pieterszoon Coen, which were allegedly stolen from the grave of 1629 in Batavia during the Siege of Batavia.

== Architecture ==
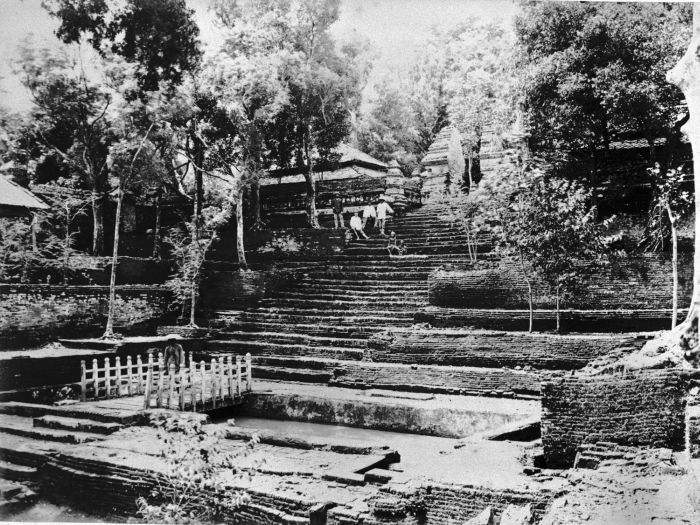
Upper entrance to Sultan Agungan in 1890

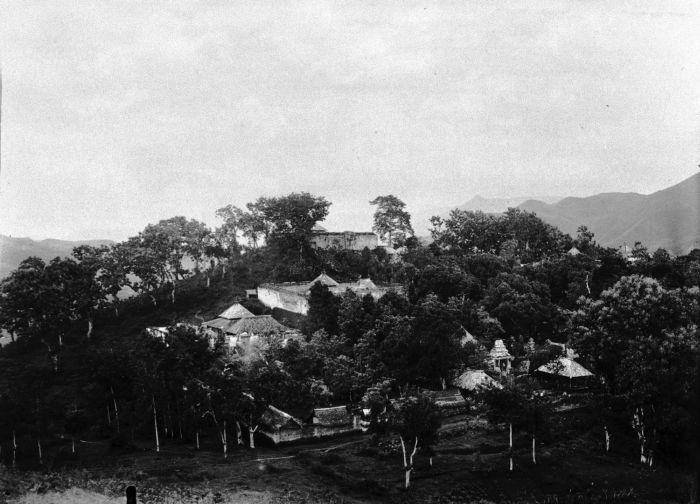
View from adjacent hill of Imogiri in the 1890s

The larger Imogiri complex is separated into three parts, named Giriloyo, Banyusumurup, and Imogiri. Traditionally it is accepted that Giriloyo was the earliest of the three graveyards. In some local folklore, Sultan Agung had already commenced work on his graveyard at Giriloyo – however because his uncle Juminah died at the graveyard, Agung was guided by various portents to choose an alternative site on a hill three kilometres to the southwest, at Imogiri. A later ruler, needing to bury outcasts in a graveyard separate from Giriloyo and Imogiri, chose Banyusumurup as an appropriate site. However, it is possible to find rivals and enemies within Javanese royal families buried within metres of each other inside the walls of Imogiri.

Within the Imogiri complex, it is divided in two ways. First, there are separate Yogyakartan and Surakartan sections. Second, the whole graveyard is divided into eight sections which constitute three generations of rulers in each section. Some are jointly governed by custodians (Juru Kunci) from Surakarta and Yogyakarta, while some are governed by representatives of one of these palaces only. The original area within the Imogiri graveyard is that area with Sultan Agung's grave – it is jointly governed. The western wing of the graveyard is the Surakartan section, while the eastern wing is the Yogyakarta section.

Not all rulers of the Sultanate of Mataram are buried in the Imogiri complex; there are several rulers who are buried elsewhere in Java. Some immediate families of rulers were also buried in Imogiri, but not all; this was dependent upon each ruler's preferences. Printed lists of the burial plots within the royal graveyard complex are maintained for Imogiri to guide researchers looking for a specific grave site. This process is sometimes complicated by the multiple names some individuals were known by during their lives.

In the tomb area also located four barrels, or padhasan, which are said to be offerings from the kingdoms to Sultan Agung. These barrels are: Gentong Nyai Siyem from Siam (modern-day Thailand), Gentong Kyai Mendung from Rum (Turkey), Gentong Kyai Danumaya from Aceh, and Gentong Nyai Danumurti from Pelembang. Water from these barrels are believed to grant wishes and have curing properties.

=== Layout ===
Imogiri complex is sectioned into three walled sections:

- Prabayas: the Top section
- Kemangdhungan: The middle section
- Srimanganti: The entrance yard

Note that dates after the ruler's name are supposed dates of interment, variant dates are possible in some sources. They are given in Gregorian calendar years. Dates after construction are arbitrary and may vary up to 10 years. In most cases, the new walled compounds were built before the death of the first ruler interred. However, the grave may precede the walls, as is probably the case in Sultan Agungan, and those that follow. Most names listed have abbreviated forms, for Javanese royalty there are usually extra titles when written, any abbreviation here is for purposes of the list and not out of disrespect for the deceased or their status.

Most sections have a sequence of three generations – 'Ego' or Father, Son, and grandson, where the succession is that simple. The ones that don't are: Kasuwargan Yogyakarta has a missing person (Hamengkubuwana II is buried at Kota Gede); Kapingsangan Surakarta has four due to family dynamics. Much earlier, Amangkurat I was buried at Tegal on the north coast of Java, and as a consequence is not in Paku Buwanan.

Juru Kunci Surakarta and Yogyakarta share the tending of the graves and courtyards in Sultan Agungan and Paku Buwanan.

Imogiri was in the 1990s 'full up', both the Girimulya and Saptorenggo sections have three generations interred. The current living rulers in Surakarta and Yogyakarta would now need to prepare a new section each on each 'side' of the graveyard to continue the practice of the last 400 years. The construction works of the new section of the Yogyakarta side have been completed.

== Burials ==
The following list consists of names of the buried and the years of construction for burials within the walled areas at Imogiri. The first two are in the shared parts; afterward, as the Mataram sultanate was split, the sections for the Yogyakarta and Surakartan rulers are separate.

- Kasultan Agungan (constructed in the 1640s)
  - Sultan Agung 1645
  - Amangkurat II 1703
  - Amangkurat III 1734
- Paku Buwanan (constructed in the 18th century)
  - Pakubuwana I 1719
  - Amangkurat IV 1726
  - Pakubuwana II 1749
- Kasuwargan Surakarta (constructed in the 1770s)
  - Pakubuwana III 1788
  - Pakubuwana IV 1820
  - Pakubuwana V 1823
- Kasuwargan Yogyakarta (constructed in the 1780s)
  - Hamengkubuwana I 1792
  - Hamengkubuwana III 1814
- Besiyaran Yogyakarta (constructed in the 1820s)
  - Hamengkubuwana IV 1826
  - Hamengkubuwana V 1855
  - Hamengkubuwana VI 1877
- Kapingsangan Surakarta (constructed in the 1840s)
  - Pakubuwana VI 1846
  - Pakubuwana VII 1858
  - Pakubuwana VIII 1861
  - Pakubuwana IX 1893
- Saptorenggo Yogyakarta (constructed in the 1920s)
  - Hamengkubuwana VII 1921
  - Hamengkubuwana VIII 1939
  - Hamengkubuwana IX 1988
- Girimulya Surakarta (constructed in the 1930s)
  - Pakubuwana X 1939
  - Pakubuwana XI 1945
  - Pakubuwana XII 2004

== See also ==
- Banyusumurup
- Giriloyo
- Javanese sacred places
- Surakarta
- Yogyakarta

== Notes ==
=== Bibliography ===
- Moertjipto (translated by Hari Hartiko)(1992) The Legend of Imogiri – The Royal cemetery of Mataram Kingdom Jakarta, Directorate General of Tourism.

Non-English sources

- Djumadi, Thojib Pasareyan Pajimatan Imogiri Jaya Baya vol43. no.22 pp. 11–12, 45–47 (29/1/1989) (in Javanese language)
- Adrisijanti, Inajati; Yogyakarta (Indonesia: Daerah Istimewa). Dinas Kebudayaan, (issuing body,) (2019), Ensiklopedia Imogiri: potret kekayaan budaya dan masyarakat, Dinas Kebudayaan, Daerah Istimewa Yogyakarta, ISBN 9786237332190
- Prawirawinarsa, Babad Alit Volkslektur no.462 (in Javanese script); transliteration
