= Pakubuwono IX =

Susuhunan of Surakarta

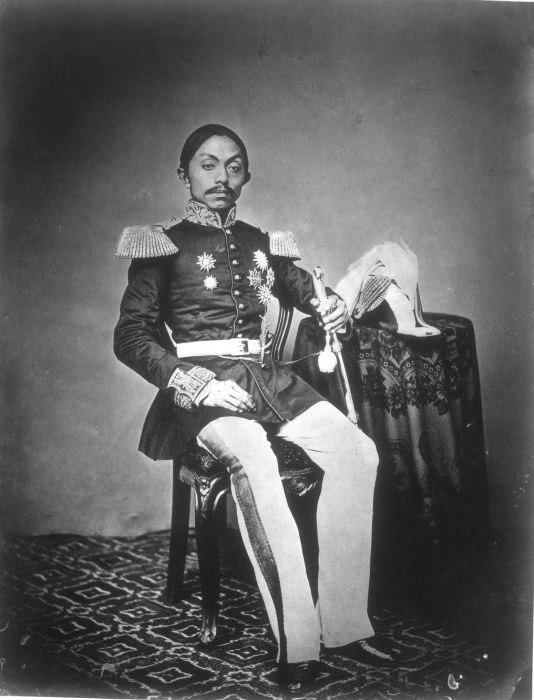
- Pakubuwono IX circa 1873

Susuhunan of Surakarta
- Reign: 1861–1893
- Coronation: 27 January 1862
- Predecessor: Pakubuwana VIII
- Successor: Pakubuwana X
- Born: Gusti Raden Mas Duksina; 22 December 1830; Surakarta, Surakarta Sunanate
- Died: 17 March 1893 (aged 62); Surakarta, Surakarta Sunanate
- Burial: Kapingsangan Tomb, Imogiri Royal Cemetery, Imogiri, Yogyakarta Sultanate
- Spouses: Gusti Kanjeng Ratu Pakubuwana (m. 1865; died 1887); Gusti Kanjeng Ratu Madurêtna
- Issue more...: Kanjeng Gusti Pangeran Harya Prabuwijaya; Kanjeng Gusti Pangeran Harya Surya Mataram; Pakubuwana X
Regnal name
- Sampeyan Dalem Ingkang Sinuhun Kanjeng Susuhunan Pakubuwana Senapati ing Ngalaga Abdurrahman Sayyidin Panatagama Khalifatullah Ingkang Jumeneng Kaping IX
- House: Mataram
- Father: Pakubuwana VI
- Mother: Gusti Kanjeng Ratu Hemas

Pakubuwono IX (also transliterated Pakubuwana IX) was the eighth Susuhunan (ruler of Surakarta). He was born in 1830, the second son of Pakubuwano VI, and reigned from 1861 until his death in 1893.

He is attributed as author of Serat woro isworo a book about genealogy and morals.

== Reign ==
Born as Gusti Raden Mas Duksina on 22 December 1830, as the son of Pakubuwana VI by his second queen consort, Gusti Kanjeng Ratu Hemas. His mother was a daughter of Kanjeng Gusti Pangeran Adipati Mangkubumi I, son of Pakubuwana III. At the time of his birth, his father had already been exiled to Ambon by the Dutch for his clandestine support of Prince Diponegoro's rebellion. Upon reaching adulthood, he was granted the title Kanjeng Gusti Pangeran Harya Prabuwijaya. After the death of Pakubuwana VII and the reign of Pakubuwana VIII, he was appointed as Kanjeng Gusti Pangeran Adipati Anom.

Pakubuwana IX ascended the throne on December 30, 1861, succeeding Pakubuwana VIII (his father's uncle). His reign was extensively chronicled by the court poet Ranggawarsita in various literary works, most notably the Serat Kalatida.

The relationship between Pakubuwana IX and Ranggawarsita was historically strained due to Dutch misinformation. Colonial officials claimed that Mas Pajangswara (Ranggawarsita's father and court scribe) had betrayed Pakubuwana VI by revealing his alliance with Prince Diponegoro, leading to the Sultan's exile. Consequently, Pakubuwana IX harbored resentment toward Pajangswara’s family, unaware that the scribe had actually died under brutal Dutch torture without confessing.

Ranggawarsita sought to reconcile with the monarch by dedicating his work, Serat Cemporet, to him. During the twilight of his career, the poet expressed his social anxieties through the famous Serat Kalatida. In this text, he praised Pakubuwana IX as a wise ruler but lamented that he was surrounded by self-serving, sycophantic officials—a period Ranggawarsita famously termed Zaman Edan (the "Age of Madness").

Under his leadership, the Surakarta Sunanate underwent significant physical development. He initiated extensive renovations of the Surakarta Palace, including the Siti Hinggil and the Panggung Sangga Buwana tower, earning him the epithet Sinuhun Bangun Kedhaton ("The Monarch who Built the Palace"). A patron of the arts, he also authored several literary works, such as Serat Wulang Putri, Serat Jayeng Sastra, Serat Menak Cina, and Serat Wirayatna.

The reign of Pakubuwana IX lasted 32 years, ending with his death on March 16, 1893. He was succeeded by his son, who reigned as Pakubuwana X.

== Personal life ==
During his youth, he was known for his relationship with Gusti Kanjeng Ratu Sekar Kedhaton, a daughter of Pakubuwana VII by his queen consort.

He had two queen consorts. On 4 December 1865, he married his second cousin, Bendara Raden Ajeng Kustiyah, elevated to Kanjeng Bendara Raden Ayu Kustiyah. A week later, on 11 December 1865, she was styled as Gusti Kanjeng Ratu Pakubuwana. Her parents were Kanjeng Pangeran Harya Hadiwijaya III and Gusti Kanjeng Ratu Bendara, a daughter of his predecessor, Pakubuwana VIII. She died on 21 March 1887.

Upon her death, on 9 May 1887, he elevated his concubine, Raden Ayu Adipati Mandayaprana II as the queen consort, styled as Gusti Kanjeng Ratu Pakubuwana. Her previous name granted upon her admission to the inner court was Raden Rarasati. She was a daughter of Raden Panji Puspawinata, a court official serving as Major in the Jayatêtana corps. Her father was a son of Raden Tumenggung Sasrawijaya, thus, she was a great-granddaughter of Kanjeng Raden Adipati Sasradiningrat II, the patih dalem. Upon her stepson ascension as Pakubuwana X, she was renamed as Gusti Kanjeng Ratu Maduratna with the name of Gusti Kanjeng Ratu Pakubuwana went to her stepdaughter-in-law.

== Family ==
- Queen consort, Gusti Kanjeng Ratu Pakubuwana, maiden name Bendara Raden Ajeng Kustiyah
  - Raden Mas Gusti Sayyidin Malik-ul-Kusna, titled Kanjeng Gusti Pangeran Adipati Anom, later Pakubuwana X, 31th (15th son)
- Queen consort, Gusti Kanjeng Ratu Maduratna
  - Raden Mas Gusti Suwita, died young, 53rd (29th son)
- Concubine, Raden Ayu Wrediningrum
  - Bendara Raden Mas Adamadi, titled Bendara Kanjeng Pangeran Hangabehi, elevated to Kanjeng Gusti Pangeran Harya Prabuwijaya, first son
    - Married Gusti Raden Ajeng Suyati, daughter of Mangkunegara IV
  - Bendara Raden Mas Surata, titled Bendara Kanjeng Pangeran Harya Natakusuma, 5th (3rd son)
  - Bendara Raden Ajeng Umi Kaltum, 15th (8th daughter)
    - Married Raden Tumenggung Purwadiningrat
- Concubine, Raden Ayu Ratna Adiningrum
  - Bendara Raden Ajeng Samsikin, 2nd (1st daughter)
    - Married Bendara Kanjeng Pangeran Harya Suryadipura II, grandson of Pakubuwana VI
  - Bendara Raden Ajeng Samsimah, 6th (3rd daughter)
    - Married Kanjeng Pangeran Harya Hadinegara II
  - Bendara Raden Ajeng Samsiyah, 8th (4th daughter)
- Concubine, Raden Ayu Dewaningrum
  - Bendara Raden Mas Kanapi, titled Bendara Kanjeng Pangeran Harya Surya Mataram, elevated to Kanjeng Gusti Pangeran Harya Surya Mataram, 3rd (2nd son)
  - Bendara Raden Mas Rahmat, titled Bendara Kanjeng Pangeran Harya Hadikusuma, 7th (4th son)
- Bendara Raden Ayu Murtiningrum
  - Bendara Raden Ajeng Rahmaniyah, 4th (2rd daughter)
    - Married Kanjeng Raden Mas Tumenggung Wiryadiningrat, son of Kanjeng Raden Adipati Sasranagara
  - Bendara Raden Ajeng Suratiyah, 9th (5th daughter)
  - Bendra Raden Mas Sutresna, titled Bendara Kanjeng Pangeran Harya Mlayakusuma I, 11th (5th son)
  - Bendara Raden Mas Sanicoso, titled Bendara Kanjeng Pangeran Harya Nyakrakusuma, 12th (6th son)
  - Bendara Raden Ajeng Siti Ruwiyah, 16th (9th daughter)
  - Bendara Raden Mas Susetya, 17th (8th son)
- Concubine, Raden Ayu Tejaningrum
  - Bendara Raden Ajeng Samsinah, 10th (6th daughter)
    - Married Pangeran Panji Puspakusuma
    - Married Raden Mas Jombo/Raden Mas Saliman, titled Kanjeng Raden Adipati Sasradiningrat IV
- Concubine, Raden Ayu Semaraningrum/Asmaraningrum
  - Bendara Raden Ajeng Siti Suwiyah, 13th (7th daughter)
    - Married Pangeran Bratakusuma
- Concubine, Raden Ayu Himbaningrum
  - Bendara Raden Ajeng Siti Kabibah, 14th (8th daughter)
  - Bendara Raden Ajeng Kamariyah, 18th (10th daughter)
    - Married Raden Mas Tumenggung Suryanegara, grandson of Pakubuwana V
- Concubine, Raden Ayu Dayaresmi, also known as Nyai Tumenggung Secadipura
  - Bendara Raden Mas Susanta, 19th (9th son)
- Concubine, Raden Maniklungit
  - Bendara Raden Mas Imam Dawud, titled Bendara Kanjeng Pangeran Harya Pakuningrat, 20th (10th son)
- Concubine, Raden Ayu Adipati Mandayaprana
  - Bendara Raden Mas Sutindra, titled Bendara Kanjeng Pangeran Harya Prabuningrat, 21st (11th son)
  - Bendara Raden Ajeng Sutaji, 25th (12th daughter)
    - Married Raden Mas Tumenggung Jayaningrat
  - Bendara Raden Mas Sunata, 32nd (16th son)
  - Bendara Raden Ajeng Sutati, 36th (19th daughter)
  - Bendara Raden Mas Sudarmaja, titled Bendara Kanjeng Pangeran Harya Kusumadilaga, 38th (18th son)
  - Bendara Raden Mas Susena, 43rd (21st son)
  - Bendara Raden Mas Siswaji, titled Bendara Kanjeng Pangeran Harya Prabumijaya, 51st (28th son)
- Concubine, Raden Ayu Dayapurnama
  - Bendara Raden Mas Guntur, titled Bendara Kanjeng Pangeran Harya Kusumadiningrat, 22nd (12th son)
    - Married Bendara Raden Ajeng Sutantinah, daughter of Mangkunegara V
  - Bendara Raden Ajeng Saptirin, 30th (16th daughter)
    - Married Raden Mas Riya Padmanegara
  - Bendara Raden Mas Sudarmadi, 39th (19th son)
- Concubine, Raden Ayu Hambarsirat
  - Bendara Raden Ajeng Sudarmi, 23rd (11th daughter)
- Concubine, Raden Ayu Dayaasmara
  - Bendara Raden Mas Abadi, titled Bendara Kanjeng Pangeran Harya Purbadiningrat, 24th (13th son)
  - Bendara Raden Ajeng Sudinah, 40th (21st daughter)
    - Married Raden Mas Riya Suryaputra, grandson of Pakubuwana VI
- Concubine, Raden Ayu Dayasari
  - Bendara Raden Ajeng Siti Kabirin, 26th (13th daughter)
    - Married Major Raden Mas Riya Purbawinata
- Concubine, Raden Ayu Wignyaningrum
  - Bendara Raden Ajeng Siti Suimah, died young, 27th (14th daughter)
  - Bendara Raden Ajeng Siti Atikah, 35th (18th daughter)
    - Married Raden Mas Riya Bratajaya
- Concubine, Raden Ayu Tasikwulan
  - Bendara Raden Ajeng Sulais, died young, 28th (15th daughter)
- Concubine, Raden Ayu Pujaningrum
  - Bendara Raden Mas Satriya, titled Bendara Kanjeng Pangeran Harya Cakradiningrat, 29th (14th son)
- Concubine, Raden Gantangsari
  - Bendara Raden Ajeng Siti Mulat, 33rd (17th daughter)
    - Married Raden Mas Riya Danuningrat
  - Bendara Raden Mas Ibnu Mulki, 49th (26th son)
- Concubine, Raden Ayu Pujakusuma
  - Bendara Raden Mas Sudarmaji, titled Bendara Kanjeng Pangeran Harya Cakraningrat II, 34th (17th son)
  - Bendara Raden Mas Wiyadi, titled Bendara Kanjeng Pangeran Harya Mlayakusuma II, 48th (25th son)
- Concubine, Raden Citrasari
  - Bendara Raden Ajeng Muryati, 37th (20th daughter)
    - Married Kanjeng Raden Adipati Jayadiningrat
- Concubine, Raden Ayu Dayakusuma
  - Bendara Raden Ajeng Suliyah, 41st (22nd daughter)
    - Married Raden Mas Riya Gandawardaya
- Concubine, Bendara Raden Ayu Ragasmara
  - Bendara Raden Mas Dananjaya, 42nd (20th son)
- Concubine, Bendara Raden Ayu Dewaasmara
  - Bendara Raden Mas Menaksunaya, 44th (22nd son)
- Concubine, Raden Ayu Pandansari
  - Bendara Raden Mas Subakda, titled Bendara Kanjeng Pangeran Harya Mangkudiningrat, 45th (23rd son)
- Concubine, Raden Ayu Ratnaningrum
  - Bendara Raden Mas Arjuna, titled Bendara Kanjeng Pangeran Harya Hadiningrat, 46th (24th son)
  - Bendara Raden Ajeng Siti 'Imamah, 52nd (24th daughter)
  - Bendara Raden Mas Pamade, 55th (30th son)
  - Bendara Raden Mas Janaka, titled Bendara Kanjeng Pangeran Harya Natadiningrat, 56th (31st son)
- Concubine, Raden Ayu Dayaningrat
  - Bendara Raden Ajeng Suparti, 47th (23rd daughter)
    - Married Raden Mas Riya Nataningrat
  - Bendara Raden Ajeng Jarahbanun, 54th (25th daughter)
    - Married Raden Mas Riya Mangkukusuma
- Concubine, Raden Randansari
  - Bendara Raden Mas Rustamaji, titled Bendara Kanjeng Pangeran Harya Santakusuma, 50th (27th son)
- Concubine, Raden Genawati
  - Bendara Raden Mas Sutrana, 57th (32rd son)
  - Bendara Raden Mas Narayana, 58th (33nd son)

== Titles ==
- During the reign of Pakubuwana VII
  - Raden Mas Gusti Duksina (since 22 December 1830)
  - Kanjeng Gusti Pangeran Harya Prabuwijaya
- During the reign of Pakubuwana VIII
  - Kanjeng Gusti Pangeran Adipati Anom Hamengkunegara Sudibya Rajaputra Narendra Mataram ing Surakarta Hadiningrat (since 17 May 1858)
- During his reign as Pakubuwana IX
  - Sampeyan Dalem Ingkang Sinuhun Kangjeng Susuhunan Pakubuwana Senapati ing Alaga Abdurrahman Sayyidin Panatagama Ingkang Jumeneng kaping Sanga ing Nagari Surakarta Hadiningrat

== Ancestry ==
Ancestors of Pakubuwono IX

Pakubuwana IV
Pakubuwana V
Gusti Kanjeng Ratu Pakubuwana
Pakubuwana VI
Raden Tumenggung Cakradipura II
Raden Ayu Sasrakusuma
Pakubuwana IX
Pakubuwana III
Kanjeng Gusti Pangeran Adipati Mangkubumi
Gusti Kanjeng Ratu Kencana
Gusti Kanjeng Ratu Hemas
Kyai Singaprana III
Mas Ayu Tasikwulan

== Notes ==
Preceded by Pakubuwono VIII	Susuhunan of Surakarta; 1861–1893	Succeeded by Pakubuwono X
