= Djatikoesoemo =

Indonesian politician

General Gusti Pangeran Harya Djatikoesoemo
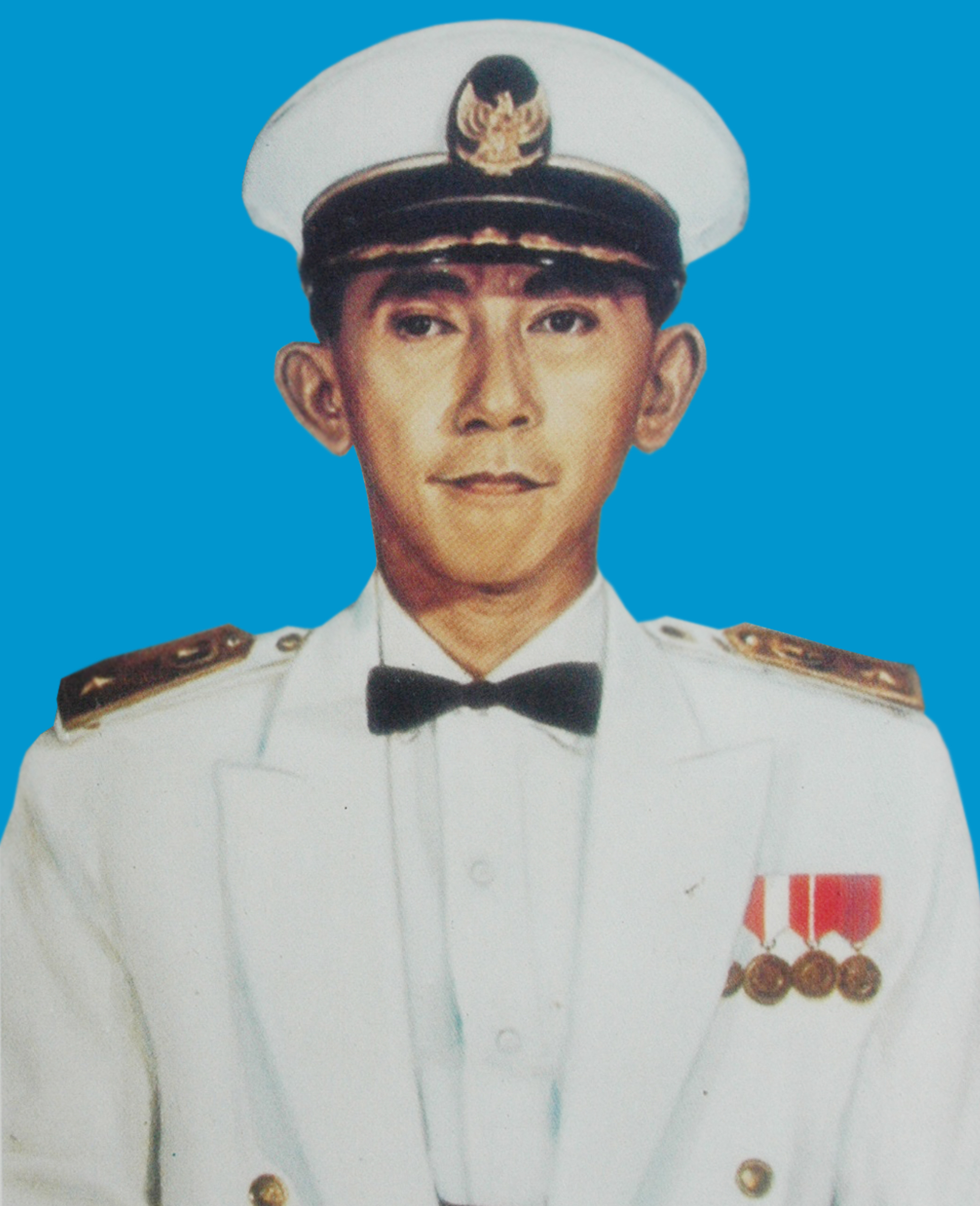
- Portrait of Djatikoesoemo

1st Minister of Land Transportation, Post, Telecommunication, and Tourism
- In office 10 July 1959 – 13 November 1963
- President: Sukarno
- Preceded by: Office established
- Succeeded by: Hidajat Martaatmadja

12th Minister of Transportation
- In office 10 July 1959 – 13 November 1963
- President: Sukarno
- Preceded by: Sukardan
- Succeeded by: Hidajat Martaatmadja

1st Chief of Staff of the Indonesian Army
- In office 15 May 1948 – 27 December 1949
- President: Sukarno
- Preceded by: Office established
- Succeeded by: General Abdul Haris Nasution

Personal details
- Born: Bendara Raden Mas Subandana; 1 July 1917 Surakarta, Surakarta Sunanate, Dutch East Indies
- Died: 4 July 1992 (aged 75) Jakarta, Indonesia
- Resting place: Imogiri Royal Graveyard
- Spouse: Raden Ayu Suharsi Widianti (m. 1948)
- Relations: House of Mataram (dynasty); Pakubuwana (house)
- Parents: Pakubuwana X (father); Raden Ayu Kirana Rukmi (mother)
- Education: Corps Opleiding Reserve Officieren (CORO)
- Occupation: Army officer; politician

Military service
- Allegiance: Dutch East Indies; Empire of Japan; Indonesia
- Branch/service: Dutch East Indies Army; Defenders of the Homeland; Indonesian Army
- Years of service: 1941–1973
- Rank: General (honorary)
- Unit: Engineers
- Commands: Indonesian Army
- Battles/wars: World War II; Dutch East Indies campaign; Battle of Tjiater Pass; Indonesian National Revolution; Operation Kraai
- Awards: National Hero of Indonesia (posthumous, 2002)

Gusti Pangeran Harya Djatikoesoemo (1 July 1917 – 4 July 1992) was an Indonesian army officer and diplomat who served as the first Chief of Staff of the Indonesian Army (1948–1949) and Ambassador to Singapore (1958–1960). He was a member of Surakarta royal family, the 23rd son of Pakubuwana X. His body was buried in Imagiri Royal Cemetery in Bantul, Yogyakarta.

He was recognized as a National Hero of Indonesia in 2002.

== Early life and education ==
His first name was Bendara Raden Mas Subandana, born in Surakarta to Raden Ayu Kirana Rukmi, a royal concubine of Pakubuwana X, on July 1, 1917. From 1931 to 1936, his father sent him to Hogere Burgerschool (HBS) in Bandung. He enrolled in higher education at Technische Hogeschool School et Delft (present-day Delft University of Technology) until the third year. However, he had to return to Java due to the outbreak of World War II, and his father died in 1939. Subsequently, he continued his education at Technische Hogeschool et Bandung (present-day Institut Teknologi Bandung).

== Personal life ==
He received the princely title of Bendara Kanjeng Pangeran Harya Jatikusuma, and later Bendara Kanjeng Pangeran Harya Purbanegara. He married in 1929 to Bendara Raden Ajeng Muryalitarina, youngest daughter of Hamengkubuwana VII by his concubine, Bendara Raden Ayu Ratnaliring Asmara. He married for the second time to Raden Ajeng Suharsi. He had three children.

He was one of the suitors of Gusti Nurul, a Mangkunegaran princess famous for her beauty.
