= Pakubuwono VI =

Susuhunan of Surakarta

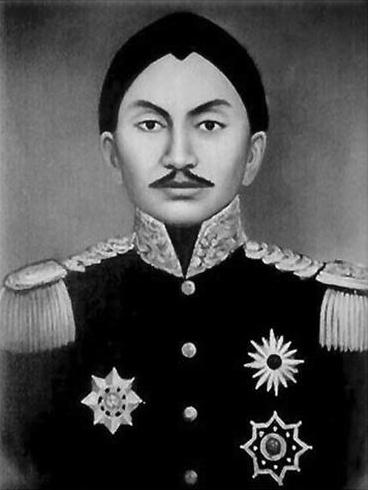

Susuhunan of Surakarta
- Reign: 1823–1830
- Coronation: 15 September 1823
- Predecessor: Pakubuwana V
- Successor: Pakubuwana VII
- Born: Bendara Raden Mas Sapardan; 26 April 1807; Surakarta, Surakarta Sunanate
- Died: 2 June 1849 (aged 42); Ambon, Moluccas
- Burial: Kapingsangan Tomb, Imogiri Royal Cemetery, Imogiri, Yogyakarta Sultanate
- Spouses: Gusti Kanjeng Ratu Kencana (m. 1824, divorced); Gusti Kanjeng Ratu Hemas (m. 1824); Gusti Kanjeng Ratu Madurêtna (m. 1824); Gusti Kanjeng Ratu Anom (died 1840)
- Issue more...: Gusti Kanjeng Ratu Timur; Pakubuwana IX
Regnal name
- Sampeyan Dalem Ingkang Sinuhun Kanjeng Susuhunan Pakubuwana Senapati ing Ngalaga Abdurrahman Sayyidin Panatagama Khalifatullah Ingkang Jumeneng Kaping VI
- House: Mataram
- Father: Pakubuwana V
- Mother: Raden Ayu Sasrakusuma

Pakubuwono VI (26 April 1807, in Surakarta, Central Java – 2 June 1849, in Ambon, Moluccas) (also transliterated Pakubuwana VI) was the fifth Susuhunan (ruler) of Surakarta from 1823 to 1830, when he was deposed by the Dutch and exiled.

== Biography ==
Born as Bendara Raden Mas Sapardan on 26 April 1807, he was the son of Pakubuwana V and his senior concubine, Raden Ayu Sasrakusuma. Her mother was daughter of Raden Tumenggung Cakradipura II by his primary wife, Raden Ayu Cakradipura, a daughter of Kanjeng Raden Adipati Sasradiningrat II, the patih dalem. Through his mother's lineage, he was a descendant of Ki Juru Martani, the first patih (prime minister) in the history of the Mataram Sultanate.

Raden Mas Sapardan ascended the throne as Pakubuwana VI on 15 September 1823, ten days after the death of his father, at the age of 16.

== Relationship with Diponegoro ==
Pakubuwana VI was a supporter of Prince Diponegoro, who led a rebellion against the Yogyakarta Sultanate and the Dutch East Indies government starting in 1825. However, as a monarch bound by treaties with the Dutch, Pakubuwana VI attempted to conceal this alliance.

To prevent their meetings from being detected by the Dutch, the two leaders employed various stratagems. One such tactic was the mimis kencana strategy, where they feigned mutual hostility and engaged in staged combat to mislead Dutch intelligence. Another was the candradimuka strategy—named after a location in Gatotkaca wayang mythology—which served as a cover for secret meetings to discuss military manoeuvres against the colonial forces.

Prince Diponegoro reportedly infiltrated the Surakarta Palace on several occasions to deliberate with Pakubuwana VI regarding the political stances of the Mangkunegaran and Madura. Upon the arrival of Dutch officials, they would stage a conflict, concluding with Diponegoro "fleeing" the palace premises.

Throughout the Java War, Pakubuwana VI maintained a double game. While providing clandestine aid and support to the rebels, he also dispatched troops to ostensibly assist the Dutch. The renowned poet Ranggawarsita claimed that, in his youth, he had been a member of these "theatrical" military units.

== Arrest by the Dutch ==
The Dutch forces eventually captured Prince Diponegoro on 28 March 1830. Following this, they turned their attention toward Pakubuwana VI. Dutch suspicion had been fueled by his persistent refusal to cede several Surakarta territories to the colonial government.

In an attempt to secure evidence against the monarch, the Dutch arrested the court scribe, Mas Pajangswara (the father of Ranggawarsita). As a member of the anti-Dutch Yasadipura family, Pajangswara refused to disclose the secret correspondence between Pakubuwana VI and Prince Diponegoro. He subsequently died under brutal torture, and his body was reportedly cast into the sea by the Dutch authorities.

On 8 June 1830, Pakubuwana VI was arrested in Mancingan by the Resident of Yogyakarta, Van Nes, and Lieutenant Colonel B. Sollewijn. Fearing that his presence would incite further rebellion, the Dutch decided to exile him from Java. He was deported to Ambon on 8 July 1830.

The Dutch misinformation campaign regarding these events later strained the relationship between Pakubuwana VI's son, Pakubuwana IX, and Pajangswara's son, Ranggawarsita. At the time of his father's exile, Pakubuwana IX was still in the womb. The throne of Surakarta subsequently passed to Pakubuwana VI's uncle, who reigned as Pakubuwana VII.

== Mystery of death ==
Pakubuwana VI died in Ambon on 2 June 1849. According to official Dutch reports, his death was the result of an accident during a sea excursion.

In 1957, his remains were relocated from Ambon to the Imogiri royal graveyard, the ancestral burial complex for the monarchs of Mataram. During the exhumation of his grave, evidence emerged indicating a hole in Pakubuwana VI's skull, specifically in the forehead. According to an analysis by General GPH Jatikusumo (a son of Pakubuwana X), the hole was consistent with the caliber of a Baker rifle bullet.

Based on the positioning of the wound, it is widely concluded that Pakubuwana VI did not die by suicide or an accidental mishap at sea. It is strongly suspected that the anti-colonial ruler was assassinated by a gunshot to the head.

== Personal life ==
He had four queen consorts. His marriage was on Jumadilakir 14, 1751 AJ, to Raden Ajeng Kusiyah, daughter of Prince Hangabehi (the future Pakubuwana VIII). Two days prior, on Jumadilakir 12, he wrote a letter to Hamengkubuwana V told his impending marrriage, and his intention to granted her the name Ratu Hemas. However, in the later sources, the daughter of Prince Hangabehi was often mentioned by the name of Gusti Kanjeng Ratu Kencana, or Gusti Kanjeng Ratu Bendara after their separation, or Gusti Kanjeng Ratu Kedhaton granted after her father ascension.

Still at the same day, he married Raden Ajeng Maknawiyah, daughter of Prince Mangkubumi and Radèn Ajêng Blênyik, daughter of Prince Hadinegara as garwa paminggir "junior consort/high ranking concubine". On Jumadilakir 19, he named them Raden Ayu Sepuh and Raden Ayu Anom respectively. The Raden Ayu Sepuh's mother was a concubine, Mas Ayu Tasikwulan. In the almanac dated on 1864, the reigning Pakubuwana IX was stated as a son of Gusti Kanjeng Ratu Hageng, previously Ratu Hemas. In the source c. 1920, Ratu Emas was told as a daughter of Mangkubumen (Pupuh 01-06) and the Gusti Timur (a name used by a son born to queen consort-referred to Pakubuwana IX) was mentioned as a grandson of Prince Mangkubumi, born to the queen consort (Pupuh 17-25). In the sources dated 1898 and 1912, it was clearly stated that Ratu Mas, the daughter of Prince Mangkubumi, had a son, Pakubuwana IX, and changed her name to Ratu Ageng. In the same Pupuh 01-06, the Ngadinegaran lady's name was Ratu Madurêtna, and clearly stated in the same 1898 and 1912 source as Ratu Madurêtna, a daughter of Kanjeng Pangeran Arya Adinegara. The difference was perhaps caused by their installation as queen consorts after entering the inner court as concubines. Both Prince Mangkubumi and Prince Hadinegara were sons of Pakubuwana III.

His favorite was Gusti Kanjeng Ratu Anom, daughter of Raden Mas Arya Adipamênang, son of Pangeran Arya Balitar II, grandson of Pakubuwana II, whose son he promised as heir and who he considered extremely beautiful.

One day, when Pakubuwana VI was in private with Gusti Kanjeng Ratu Anom, he asked her what she desired the most. She told him she wanted to be with him in this life and in a thousand lives, and asked him about his only love. She wished for a son who would be his heir to the throne, so that no other woman would bear his heir. Pakubuwana VI vowed that he wouldn't turn to another. Outside, the mountain and earth reacted as witnesses. He realized his wife wished heavily; he worried that if she didn't bear an heir, then what would happen to Surakarta? He summoned Nyi Ageng Secapura and the palace officials about what Ratu Anom wished. The patih suggested His Majesty ask a hermit who lived in Mount Merbabu in the region of Salatiga, named Kyai Thuthuk. Ki Jagastru was delegated in secret.

Long story short, Kyai Thuthuk came to the palace, suggesting His Majesty prepare a dish of flawless black chicken, ate a half by the king and a half by himself, and the other half must be quickly given to the wife who intended. As a result, Ratu Hemas conceived. Within three months, the news reached Ratu Anom. She was so sad that she wanted to commit suicide by fire. His Majesty was shocked, embraced her, and asked for forgiveness. He went out to perform ascetic meditation, "bangun tapa". The Dutch consider it rebellion, exiled him to Ambon, with Ratu Anom being the only queen consort who accompanied him.

In exile, he started showing interest in Nonah Kuwi, a Chinese lady, who sometimes made Ratu Anom jealous. He married her, giving her the new name of Raden Ayu Nyonyah Retnasmara. Ratu Anom spoke carefully to the king in a polite tone that she hadn't yet clearly heard news about certain matters and sought confirmation from the king. The king responds calmly, telling her not to be upset or offended. However, His Majesty was giving more and more attention to Nonah Kuwi. At the same time in Surakarta, Ratu Hemas was already giving birth to a son, heir to the throne. This news was so good. Later, His Majesty took new wives named Bendara Raden Ayu Tejaasmara and another Chinese lady, renamed as Raden Ayu Dewaasmara, while Nonah Kuwi Retnasmara almost rivaled Ratu Anom. Nonah Kuwi died after giving birth to a daughter, Sapariyam, adopted by Ratu Anom. His Majesty's love moved to Tejaasmara, who also gave him a daughter. She shortly afterwards conceived again and gave birth to a son who would later known as Pangeran Suryaningrat. She was also the mother of his next son, Bendara Raden Mas Sawaliman (the future Bendara Kanjeng Pangeran Harya Suryatmaja), which threw Ratu Anom in tantrums. He asked Ratu Anom to accept the fate, as she couldn't give one since they were in Java until in exile. He asked her to follow an ascetic and simple life, but unfortunately, she was getting sick and died, leaving him in sorrow.

== Family ==
Royal consorts

- Gusti Kanjeng Ratu Kencana (born Raden Ajeng Kusiyah), a first cousin of the Susuhunan, married in 1824, divorced.
- Gusti Kanjeng Ratu Hemas (born Raden Ajeng Maknawiyah), a first cousin once removed of the Susuhunan, married in 1824, later the Gusti Kanjeng Ratu Hageng (Queen Dowager).
  - Raden Mas Gusti Duksina (1830 - 1893), titled Kanjeng Gusti Pangeran Prabuwijaya, appointed as the Kanjeng Gusti Pangeran Adipati Anom Hamengkunegara (Crown Prince) of Surakarta, succeeded as Pakubuwana IX.
- Gusti Kanjeng Ratu Madurêtna (born Raden Ajeng Blênyik), a first cousin once removed of the Susuhunan, married in 1824.
- Gusti Kanjeng Ratu Anom (died 1840), a third cousin of the Susuhunan.
  - Raden Ajeng Saparinten
  - Raden Ajeng Sapariyah, titled Gusti Kanjeng Ratu Timur
    - Married Kanjeng Pangeran Harya Natabrata II, grandson of Pakubuwana V

Concubines

- Raden Ayu Asmaraningrum
  - Raden Ajeng Sadiyah
- Raden Ayu Imbaningrum
  - Raden Ajeng Mublak
    - Married Kanjeng Pangeran Harya Kusumabrata II, grandson of Pakubuwana V
- Raden Ayu Tejaningrum
  - Raden Ajeng Sapariyam
    - Married Kanjeng Pangeran Harya Santakusuma II
  - Raden Ajeng Sapariyem
    - Married Raden Mas Akhadiyat, titled Kanjeng Pangeran Harya Cakradiningrat, grandson of Pakubuwana V and Pakubuwana VII
  - Raden Mas Sawal, titled Kanjeng Pangeran Harya Suryaatmaja, elevated to Kanjeng Gusti Pangeran Harya Natapraja

== Ancestry ==
Ancestors of Pakubuwono VI

Pakubuwana III
Pakubuwana IV
Gusti Kanjeng Ratu Kencana
Pakubuwana V
Raden Adipati Cakradiningrat
Gusti Kanjeng Ratu Pakubuwana
Pakubuwana VI
Raden Tumenggung Cakradipura I
Raden Tumenggung Cakradipura II
Raden Ayu Sasrakusuma
Kanjeng Raden Adipati Sasradiningrat II
Raden Ayu Cakradipura

== Bibliography ==
- Miksic, John N., ed. (2006). Karaton Surakarta. A look into the court of Surakarta Hadiningrat, central Java. Singapore: Marshall Cavendish Editions. ISBN 981-261-226-2. – Originally published as By the will of His Serene Highness Paku Buwono XII. Surakarta: Yayasan Pawiyatan Kabudayan Karaton Surakarta. 2004.

Preceded by Pakubuwono V	Susuhunan of Surakarta; 1823–1830	Succeeded by Pakubuwono VII
