= Notonagoro =

Indonesian legal scholar (1905–1981)

Kanjeng Raden Tumenggung Notonagoro
- Born: Sukamto; 10 December 1905; Sragen, Indonesia
- Died: September 23, 1981 (aged 75); Yogyakarta, Indonesia
- Known for: Discussions of Pancasila
- Spouse: Bendara Raden Ajeng Kustimah/Bendara Raden Ayu Notonagoro
- Children: Bendara Raden Ayu Mahyastoeti Soemantri Notohadinegoro; Bendara Raden Ayu Koesmoemkamdarimah Herijanto
- Father: Kanjeng Raden Tumenggung Singaranu
- Scientific career
- Fields: Philosophy
- Workplaces: Gadjah Mada University

Prof. Dr. (H.C.) Drs. KRT. Notonagoro (10 December 1905 – 23 September 1981) was an Indonesian legal scholar and thinker. He is credited as being the first to approach the state philosophy of Pancasila philosophically.

== Biography ==
Notonagoro was born Sukamto in Sragen, Central Java, Indonesia on 10 December 1905. After marrying Gusti Raden Ayu Kostimah, daughter of Pakubuwono X, Susuhunan of Surakarta, he adopted the royal title Raden Mas Tumenggung and changed his name to Notonagoro.

Notonagoro graduated from the Rechtshogeschool in Jakarta in 1929, receiving the title Meester in de Rechten. He later received a Doctorandus in de indologie from Leiden University, Netherlands, in 1932. After graduating, he found work in the Central Economics Office in Surakarta from 1932 to 1938. At roughly the same time, from 1933 to 1939, he taught at the Particuliere Algemene Middelbare School in Jakarta.

A year after Indonesia's independence, Notonagoro was asked to join the Ministry of Prosperity; the following year, he began teaching at the Faculty of Agriculture in Klaten, Central Java. In 1949 he assisted in the founding of Gadjah Mada University in Yogyakarta, later becoming a guest lecturer teaching agrarian law. By 1952 he had become dean of the faculty of law.

Notonagoro became the founder of Gadjah Mada University's faculty of philosophy in 1968. For his work with the university and thoughts on Pancasila, Notonagoro was given an honorary doctorate in philosophy from Gadjah Mada University on 19 December 1973. He died on 23 September 1981.

== Views ==
=== On Pancasila ===
Notonagoro viewed the Indonesian people and culture as the causa materialis of Pancasila. He believed that Pancasila, no matter how phrased, kept the same basic meaning, namely as the state philosophy, and that it is not a political concept but a world view. As he considered Pancasila a central tenet of the Indonesian political system, Notonagoro considered it unchangeable, with the same meaning and same aspirations conveyed to each generation of Indonesians.

He saw three fundamental aspects of Pancasila: political, socio-cultural, and religious. In Notonagoro's system, the three aspects, as well as the five individual tenets of Pancasila, are a compound unit (Indonesian: majemuk-tunggal). Notonagoro also saw Pancasila as existing in a pyramidal hierarchy, with each tenet being a refinement of the one before it; this hierarchy ensured that Pancasila should be taken as a whole, as Notonagoro viewed the abandonment of one or more tenets as destabilizing the whole system. For example, the first tenet (Belief in the one and only God), is implicitly the belief in the one and only God, complete with just and civilized humanity, the unity of Indonesia as well as democracy guided by the inner wisdom in the unanimity arising out of deliberations amongst representatives and full of social justice for all of the people of Indonesia. According to Notonagoro, the first two tenets, belief in the one and only God and just and civilized humanity, covered all aspects of humanity and served as the basis for the other three tenets.

=== On government ===
Notonagoro viewed the Indonesian government as a "monodualist" state, keeping both the cultural norms as well as national safety, peace, and order. He saw the priorities of government as follows, in descending order:

1. The public good, defined as the good of the State
2. The public good, defined as the good of the collective population
3. The needs of groups of individual citizens, including ones unable to be met by the citizens themselves
4. The needs of individual citizens, including ones unable to be met by the citizens themselves; this includes the poor, and abandoned children

According to Notonagoro, the government derives its powers from its citizens. He identified his views on the subject as being related to social democracy.

== Legacy ==
According to Mustofa Anshori, assistant rector at Gadjah Mada University in 2006, Notonagoro helped establish the philosophical conceptualizations in the contextualization of Pancasila.

== Notes ==
1. Original: "Sila ke-Tuhanan Yang Maha Esa adalah ke-Tuhanan Yang Maha Esa yang berkemanusiaan yang adil dan beradab, yang berpersatuan Indonesia, yang berkerakyatan yang dipimpin oleh hikhmat kebijaksanaan dalam permusyawaratan/perwakilan dan yang berkeadilan sosial bagi seluruh rakyat Indonesia".
