= Pajimatan Imogiri Mosque =

Historic mosque in the Imogiri cemetery complex

Pajimatan Himagiri Mosque
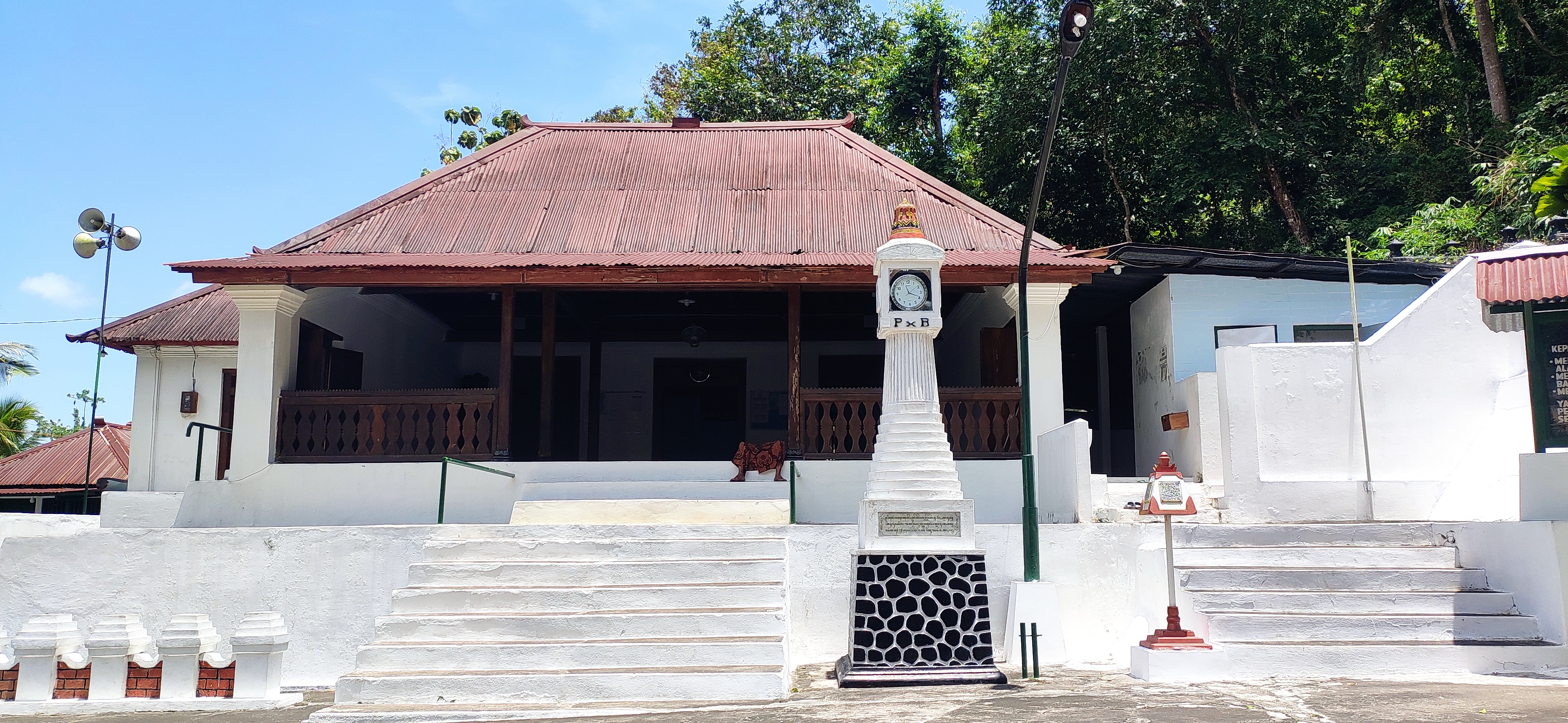

- Location in Indonesia

Religion
- Affiliation: Sunni Islam

Location
- Location: 39HV+3W7, Pajimatan Payaman Utara, Girirejo, Kec. Imogiri, Kabupaten Bantul, Daerah Istimewa Yogyakarta 55782, Indonesia
- Country: Indonesia
- Coordinates: 7°55′21″S 110°23′41″E

Architecture
- Type: Mosque
- Style: Javanese architecture
- Established: 17th century

The Pajimatan Himagiri Mosque is a mosque located in the Astana Pajimatan Himagiri royal cemetery in Yogyakarta, southern Java, Indonesia. It was built during the reign of Sultan Agung of Mataram in the 17th century.

== History ==
The mosque was built in the 17th century as part of the Astana Pajimatan Himagiri complex by Sultan Agung of Mataram (r. 1613–1645), intended as a place for visitors and pilgrims to pray while paying their respects in the cemetery. It was the second mosque to be constructed next to a royal cemetery in Yogyakarta, the first being the Great Mosque of Mataram Kotagede, although in that case the mosque had existed before the cemetery. In the early 1820s, the son of Hamengkubuwono III of Yogyakarta, Diponegoro, would frequently meditate and pray in the mosque, until he had experienced a "religious reawakening" and became convinced of his need to rebel against the Dutch colonial authorities, starting the Java War that lasted from 1825 to 1830 until he was arrested by Hendrik Merkus de Kock, general of the Dutch army. After the Second World War, the mosque experienced several restoration works as well as extensive renovations, although the appearance of the mosque did not change and remained as it was since the 17th century.

Daily prayers are held in the mosque, as are the janazah (funeral prayer) for the deceased who are to be buried in the nearby Girimulya Surakarta cemetery, which is the only actively used cemetery in the royal burial ground. As of April 2026, the most recent burial was that of Pakubuwono XIII of Surakarta, whose janazah was held at the mosque. Much like the rest of the cemetery complex, tourists are required to wear traditional Javanese clothing in order to visit the mosque.

== Architecture ==
The Pajimatan Himagiri Mosque is situated a few metres away from the main entrance to the Astana Pajimatan Himagiri. The layout of the main mosque is divided into two sections; both are square rooms, with one being the main prayer hall and the other being an extension of the porch, while a small rectangular room annexed to the main prayer hall serves as the female prayer hall. A cluster of four wooden pillars known as saka guru act as support structures in the main prayer hall for the central chamber of the tiered roof. The whole mosque has an area of 60m² while the porch of the mosque is 18m² and the courtyard is 80m² in measurements.

== See also ==
- Islam in Indonesia
- List of mosques in Indonesia
