= Pakubuwono X =

Ninth Susuhunan of Surakarta (1866–1939)

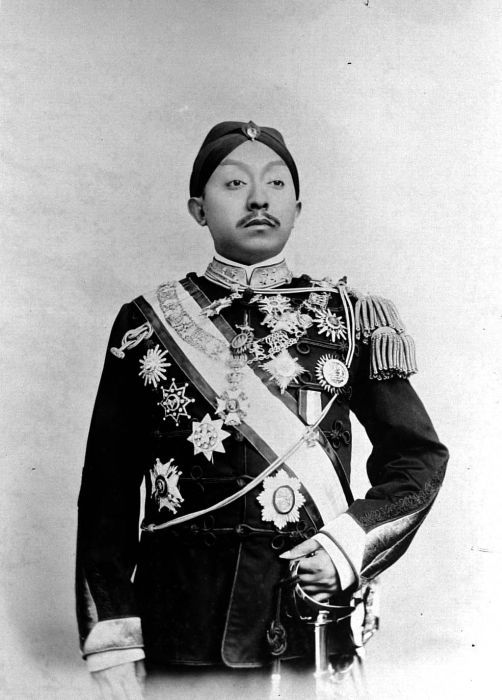
- Pakubuwono X, wearing the uniform of a KNIL major-general

Susuhunan of Surakarta
- Reign: 1893–1939
- Coronation: 30 March 1893
- Predecessor: Pakubuwana IX
- Successor: Pakubuwana XI
- Born: Gusti Raden Mas Sayyiddin Malik-ul-Kusna; 29 November 1866; Surakarta, Surakarta Sunanate
- Died: 22 February 1939 (aged 72); Surakarta, Surakarta Sunanate
- Burial: Girimulya Tomb, Imogiri Royal Cemetery, Imogiri, Yogyakarta Sultanate
- Spouses: Gusti Kanjeng Ratu Pakubuwana of Mangkunegaran (m. 1890; died 1924) Gusti Kanjeng Ratu Hemas of Yogyakarta (m. 1915)
- Issue more...: Pakubuwana XI; Bendara Kanjeng Pangeran Harya Djatikoesoemo; Gusti Kanjeng Ratu Pembayun; Gusti Bendara Raden Ayu Adipati Paku Alam VII
Regnal name
- Sampeyan Dalem Ingkang Sinuhun Kanjeng Susuhunan Pakubuwana Senapati ing Ngalaga Abdurrahman Sayyidin Panatagama Khalifatullah Ingkang Jumeneng Kaping X
- House: Mataram
- Father: Pakubuwana IX
- Mother: Gusti Kanjeng Ratu Pakubuwana

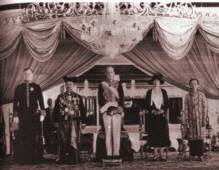
Pakubuwono X with Dutch East Indies Governor General Andries Cornelis Dirk de Graeff (center) in 1928.

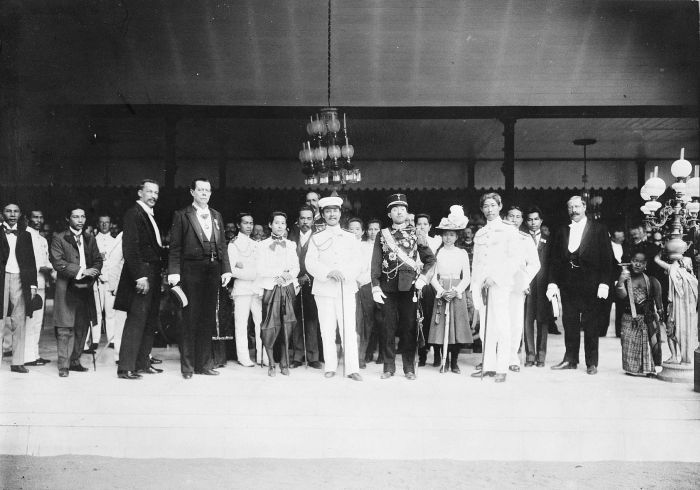
Group portrait during a visit by King Chulalongkorn of Siam (now Thailand).

Javanese case with the emblem of Surakarta, designed by Pakubuwono X 1930 - Livrustkammaren

Pakubuwono X (also transliterated Pakubuwana X, sometimes abbreviated PB X; 29 November 1866 – 22 February 1939), despite his regnal name, was the ninth Susuhunan of Surakarta. He reigned from 1893 to 1939, making him the longest reigning Sunan in the history of Surakarta.

He officially succeeded his father, the eighth Sunan, as monarch two weeks after his death on March 30, 1893.

He was designated a National Hero of Indonesia for his role in the independence movement.

== Birth ==
His birth name (Javanese: asma timur) was Gusti Raden Mas Sayyidin Malikul Kusna, son of Pakubuwono IX by his queen consort, Gusti Kanjeng Ratu Pakubuwana. Her mother was a daughter of Kanjeng Pangeran Harya Hadiwijaya II and Gusti Kanjeng Ratu Bendara, daughter of Pakubuwana VIII.

By the age of three years old, he was appointed as heir-apparent by the title of Kanjeng Gusti Pangeran Adipati Anom Hamengkunegara Sudibya Rajaputra Narendra ing Mataram.

== Politics ==
His reign corresponded with the political changes happening in the Dutch East Indies at the time, in particular the growth of local indigenous political organizations such as Budi Utomo and Sarekat Islam of which he and the royal family were patrons.

== Family ==
Pakubuwono X was known to have many concubines, but his main consort was GKR Hemas, the daughter of Sultan Hamengkubuwono VII of Yogyakarta born to his third consort, GKR Kencono. Another consort was GKR Pakubuwono, the daughter of Mangkunegara IV by his primary consort. He was also a major contributor to improvements at the Royal Graveyard of Imogiri, where he is buried.

Royal consorts

- Gusti Kanjeng Ratu Pakubuwana (born Bendara Raden Ajeng Sumarti, died 1924), married in 1890, member of the Mangkunegaran household. She was a daughter of Mangkunegara IV.
- Gusti Kanjeng Ratu Hemas (born Gusti Raden Ajeng Mursudarinah, 1895 – 1944), married in 1915, member of the Yogyakarta household. She was a daughter of Hamengkubuwana VII.
  - Gusti Raden Ajeng Kustiyah (1919 – 1988), titled Gusti Kanjeng Ratu Pembayun
    - Married Mr. Kanjeng Raden Mas Harya Sis Cakraningrat (1911 – 1961), Regent of Bangkalan

Chief concubine

- Kanjeng Bendara Raden Ayu Rêtna Purnama
  - Bendara Raden Mas Abimanyu, titled Bendara Kanjeng Pangeran Harya Kusumayuda
    - Married Gusti Kanjeng Ratu Hangger, daughter of Hamengkubuwana VII
  - Bendara Raden Ajeng Kusrahmani
    - Married Raden Mas Winarno, titled Kanjeng Pangeran Harya Adipati Jayanegara, Patih Dalem of Surakarta
  - Bendara Raden Ajeng Rêtna Puwasa (1892 – ), styled Gusti Bendara Raden Ayu Adipati Paku Alam
    - Married Kanjeng Gusti Pangeran Adipati Arya Paku Alam VII (1882 – 1937), Duke of Pakualaman

Concubines

- Raden Ayu Candrarukmi, elevated to Raden Ayu Adipati Sêdhah Mirah
  - Bendara Raden Ajeng Kusniyah, titled Gusti Kanjeng Ratu Alit
    - Married Raden Mas Matthes, titled Bendara Kanjeng Pangeran Harya Surya Mataram II
  - Bendara Raden Mas Subtandar
- Raden Ayu Himbarukmi
  - Bendara Raden Ajeng Antawati
    - Married Raden Mas Harya Prawiradiningrat
    - Married Bendara Kanjeng Pangeran Harya Singasari
- Raden Widarukmi
  - Bendara Raden Ajeng Pergiwati
- Raden Ayu Mandayarêtna (born Raden Ajeng Siti Supiyah)
  - Bendara Raden Mas Anantasena (1886 – 1945), titled Bendara Kanjeng Pangeran Harya Hangabehi, later Pakubuwana XI
- Raden Riya Mandayaprana (born Raden Rara Murtasiyah)
  - Bendara Raden Mas Sayid Samun, titled Bendara Kanjeng Pangeran Harya Natapraja
- Raden Rênggarukmi
  - Bendara Raden Mas Sugyanta, titled Bendara Kanjeng Pangeran Harya Natabrata
- Raden Sitarukmi
  - Bendara Raden Mas Setyajit or Indrajit (1888 – 1975), titled Bendara Kanjeng Pangeran Harya Hadiwijaya, elevated to Kanjeng Gusti Pangeran Panembahan Hadiwijaya Maharsitama, member of Volksraad
- Raden Ayu Sêtyarukmi
  - Bendara Raden Ajeng Rêtna Patimah
    - Married Raden Mas Harya Suryadiningrat
- Raden Kumudarukmi
  - Bendara Raden Ajeng Siti Katijah
    - Married Raden Mas Harya Purwanegara
- Raden Ayu Pandamrukmi
  - Bendara Raden Mas Sumeh, titled Bendara Kanjeng Pangeran Harya Suryabrata
    - Married Raden Ajeng Usimah, daughter of Raden Mas Harya Jayaningrat
  - Bendara Raden Ajeng Kusdinah
    - Married Raden Mas Muladi, titled Kanjeng Pangeran Harya Bratadiningrat
  - Bendara Raden Ajeng Kusprapti
    - Married dr. Kanjeng Raden Tumenggung Padmanegara
    - Married Kanjeng Raden Mas Harya Kusumajati
- Raden Rara Muryati
  - Bendara Raden Ajeng Siti Kusinah
- Raden Ayu Pujarukmi
  - Bendara Raden Ajeng Kustantinah (1898 – 1962), founder of Putri Narpawandawa
    - Married Raden Mas Saparas (1885 – 1967), titled Kanjeng Pangeran Harya Wuryaningrat, member of BPUPK
- Raden Ayu Trêngganarukmi
  - Bendara Raden Mas Rokhyalun
  - Bendara Raden Ajeng Kussalbiyah
    - Married Kanjeng Raden Mas Tumenggung Harya Purnama Hadiningrat, Regent of Brebes
- Raden Ayu Tejarukmi
  - Bendara Raden Mas Subekti, titled Bendara Kanjeng Pangeran Harya Hadisurya
  - Bendara Raden Ajeng Kusngaimah
    - Married Kanjeng Raden Mas Harya Wiryadiningrat
- Raden Ayu Purnamarukmi
  - Bendara Raden Mas Sujana, titled Bendara Kanjeng Pangeran Harya Purbanegara, Major General (TNI)
    - Married Bendara Raden Ajeng Muryalitarinah, daughter of Hamengkubuwana VII
  - Bendara Raden Ajeng Kusnapsiyah
    - Married Raden Mas Harya Suryaningrat
  - Bendara Raden Ajeng Kusmartinah
    - Married Raden Mas Tumenggung Harya Suganda, Regent of Purbalingga
- Raden Ayu Pandamrukmi II
  - Bendara Raden Mas Sutijap, titled Bendara Kanjeng Pangeran Harya Mr. Jayakusuma, founder of Indonesian Institute of the Arts, Surakarta
- Raden Ayu Susilarukmi
  - Bendara Raden Ajeng Kusyah
    - Married Bendara Kanjeng Pangeran Harya Panular
    - Married Kanjeng Raden Mas Harya Jayadiningrat
  - Bendara Raden Ajeng Kuspiyah
    - Married Kanjeng Raden Mas Tumenggung Harya Mangkuyuda
  - Bendara Raden Ajeng Kustrinah
    - Married Bendara Kanjeng Pangeran Harya Natadilaga
- Raden Ayu Ismayarukmi
  - Bendara Raden Ajeng Kusrinah
    - Married Bendara Kanjeng Pangeran Harya Cakrakusuma
- Raden Riya Ruwiyastuti
  - Bendara Raden Ajeng Kustrini
- Raden Ayu Mandayarukmi
  - Bendara Raden Mas Sutresna
- Raden Ayu Renggarukmi II
  - Bendara Raden Ajeng Kusindinah
    - Married Raden Mas Harya Cakrawinata
- Raden Ayu Candrarukmi
  - Bendara Raden Ajeng Kusmangani
  - Bendara Raden Ajeng Kusngaisah
    - Married Raden Mas Sawarno (1902 – 1967), titled Kanjeng Raden Mas Harya Adipati Sosrodiningrat V, Patih Dalem of Surakarta and member of BPUPK
  - Bendara Raden Ajeng Kustarinah
    - Married Kanjeng Raden Mas Tumenggung Yudanegara
  - Bendara Raden Ajeng Kusmaknawiyah
    - Married Kanjeng Pangeran Panji Suryadipura
- Raden Ayu Pradaparukmi
  - Bendara Raden Mas Sudira (1905 – 1972), titled Bendara Kanjeng Pangeran Harya Suryahamijaya, member of BPUPK and PPKI, chairman of the first National Sports Week (PON) in 1948
    - Married Raden Ajeng Suharti, daughter of Kanjeng Pangeran Harya Adipati Danureja VII, Patih Dalem of Yogyakarta
- Raden Ayu Sudamarukmi
  - Bendara Raden Mas Sangadi
- Raden Ayu Kiranarukmi
  - Bendara Raden Mas Subandana (1917 – 1992), titled Bendara Kanjeng Pangeran Harya Djatikoesoemo, Lieutenant General (TNI), first Chief Staff of the Army (KSAD)
    - Married Raden Ajeng Suharsi
  - Bendara Raden Ajeng Kusduryantinah
    - Married Pramukusuma
  - Bendara Raden Ajeng Kusbandinah
  - Bendara Raden Mas Subandriya, titled Bendara Kanjeng Pangeran Harya Priyambada
- Raden Riya Widastuti
  - Bendara Raden Ajeng Kustimah
    - Married Sukamto (1905 – 1981), titled Kanjeng Raden Tumenggung Notonagoro, Prof. Dr. (H.C.) Mr. Drs., founder of the Faculty of Philosophy at Gadjah Mada University
- Raden Ayu Sumintarukmi
  - Bendara Raden Mas Suninta, titled Bendara Kanjeng Pangeran Harya Suryakusuma
  - Bendara Raden Mas Kasan
  - Bendara Raden Mas Kusen, titled Bendara Kanjeng Pangeran Harya Natapraja
- Raden Ayu Wignyarukmi
- Raden Ayu Gandarukmi
- Unknown
  - Bendara Kanjeng Pangeran Harya Harya Mataram, Rector of the Sebelas Maret University

== Motorcar ==
The monarch loved motorcars. In 1894 His Majesty purchased a Benz Victoria Phaeton for a staggering 10,000 guilders, which for comparison purpose, the same amount of money was at the time, could only be obtained by a common manual labourer in three centuries time of labor. This, while proving himself as one of the richest monarch of the land at the time, made him the first person to own a car within the territory of Dutch East Indies, preceding by two years from the first car ownership in the Netherlands mainland.

the first public sight of the car is said, due to the car's ability to move by itself without being drawn by horses, left the general mass in such state of fear and awe, that it was nicknamed Kereta Setan (literal translation demonic carriage). The iconic benz still survives to this day, but was taken out of the country for Amsterdam Motor Show in 1924, presumably after the monarch relinquished the ownership, where it remains in the country to this day as part of an exhibition in Louwman Museum.

This in effect made the monarch regarded as a pioneer of the automobile industry in Indonesia. All the while His Majesty continued to expand the growing collection of motorcars, often luxury limousines with big seating capacities to accommodate his big families and entourages while travelling, with some cars is said to still survive in the royal garages in Surakarta, though the condition remains to be a mystery.

== Death and funeral train ==
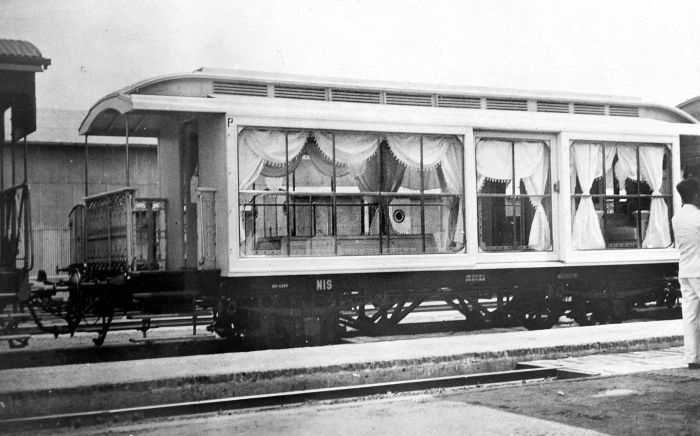
The prepared carriage with the coffin of PB X on trip to Yogyakarta

After PB X's death, his coffin was transported between Surakarta and Yogyakarta by a NIS train. The remaining journey between Yogyakarta and Imogiri was by royal carriage. His coffin's trip to Imogiri was one of the most photographed royal funeral processions of rulers of his era.

== Ancestry ==
Ancestors of Pakubuwono X

Pakubuwana V
Pakubuwana VI
Raden Ayu Sasrakusuma
Pakubuwana IX
Kanjeng Gusti Pangeran Adipati Mangkubumi
Gusti Kanjeng Ratu Hemas
Mas Ayu Tasikwulan
Pakubuwana X
Kanjeng Pangeran Harya Hadiwijaya
Kanjeng Pangeran Harya Hadiwijaya
Bendara Raden Ayu Hadiwijaya
Gusti Kanjeng Ratu Pakubuwana
Pakubuwana VIII
Gusti Kanjeng Ratu Bendara
Gusti Kanjeng Ratu Pakubuwana

== See also ==
- Pakubuwono

== Notes ==
Regnal titles
| Preceded by Pakubuwono IX | Susuhunan of Surakarta; 1893–1939 | Succeeded by Pakubuwono XI |
