= Pakubuwono V =

Susuhunan of Surakarta

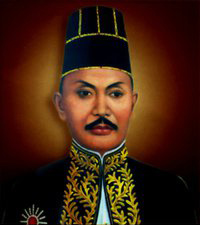

Susuhunan of Surakarta
- Reign: 1820–1823
- Predecessor: Pakubuwana IV
- Successor: Pakubuwana VI
- Born: Gusti Raden Mas Sugandhi; 13 December 1784; Surakarta, Surakarta Sunanate
- Died: 5 September 1823 (aged 38)
- Burial: Imogiri Royal Cemetery, Imogiri, Yogyakarta Sultanate
- Spouse: Gusti Kanjeng Ratu Hemas (died 1821) Gusti Kanjeng Ratu Kencana ()
- Issue more...: Gusti Kanjeng Ratu Sekar Kedhaton; Pakubuwana VI
Regnal name
- Sampeyan Dalem Ingkang Sinuhun Kanjeng Susuhunan Pakubuwana Senapati ing Ngalaga Abdurrahman Sayyidin Panatagama Ingkang Jumeneng Kaping V
- House: Mataram
- Father: Pakubuwana IV
- Mother: Gusti Kanjeng Ratu Pakubuwana

Pakubuwono V (also transliterated Pakubuwana V) (13 December 1784 – 5 September 1823) was the fourth Susuhunan (ruler of Surakarta). He reigned from 1820 to 1823.

== Early life ==
He was born during the reign of his grandfather, Pakubuwana III, as the only son of Kanjeng Gusti Pangeran Adipati Anom Hamengkunegara (the future Pakubuwana IV), born to his primary as well as favorite wife. His mother, Raden Ayu Adipati Anom (née Raden Ajeng Handaya), was the eldest daughter of Raden Adipati Cakradiningrat I of Pamekasan. However, she died when he was an infant. His father, in such a grievance, made a special request to bury her in the porch of the Kasunanan Surakarta Mosque in Laweyan. It broke the customs since the reign of Sultan Agung, the Mataram monarchs and their immediate family descendants would be buried in Astana Pajimatan Imogiri.

In 1888, the Adipati Anom ascended the throne as Pakubuwana IV. Later, in a sororate marriage, his father married his younger aunt, Raden Ajeng Sakaptinah, installed her as queen consort, titled Gusti Kanjeng Ratu Kencana Wungu (later as queen dowager titled Gusti Kanjeng Ratu Hageng). According to Kanjeng Raden Tumenggung Koesrahadi S. Jayaningrat's record, before the age of eight, on August 13, 1892, he was appointed as the heir-apparent by the title Kanjeng Gusti Pangeran Adipati Anom Sudibya Rajaputra Narendra Mataram ingkang kaping III ing Surakarta Hadiningrat, and -Hamengkunegara was granted on July 11, 1796. Thus, his full title was Kanjeng Gusti Pangeran Adipati Anom Hamengkunegara Sudibya Rajaputra Narendra Mataram ingkang kaping III ing Surakarta Hadiningrat.

== Reign ==
He was crowned in October 1820 as Pakubuwana V and elevated his mother, the late Kanjeng Raden Ayu Adipati Anom Hamengkunegara, as queen consort, styled as Gusti Kanjeng Ratu Pakubuwana.

People called him Sunan Sugih because he wasn't only rich in possessions but also rich in heart. The appellation came after the death of his stepmother, Gusti Kanjeng Ratu Kencana Wungu, in January 1821. She was regarded as wealthy. After her death, her inheritance would be divided among two of her surviving children: Gusti Kanjeng Ratu Pembayun and Kanjeng Gusti Pangeran Harya Purbaya. The Sunan issued a decree, delivered by his stepbrother, Bendara Kanjeng Pangeran Harya Hangabehi, who was in charge, to Ratu Pembayun and Prince Purbaya, asking for their written agreement regarding his inheritance, as Ratu Kencana was the younger sister of Ratu Pakubuwana, which they agreed. Unexpectedly, he didn't take a penny; instead, he paid all the expenses for her deceased ceremony, as well as her debts and liabilities during her lifetime. Everyone speechless.

== Personal life ==
His father arranged for him to marry a daughter of Raden Mas Arya Jayadiningrat. Her father was a son of Kanjeng Raden Adipati Jayaningrat, the patih dalem (r. 1784 –1796) by his primary consort, Raden Ayu Adipati Jayaningrat, a daughter of Pakubuwana III. As his crown princess consort, she was officially installed as Kanjeng Raden Ayu Adipati Anom and then Gusti Kanjeng Ratu Hemas after his ascension. She died on March 29, 1821. Her only child was Gusti Raden Ajeng Kabibah, styled as Gusti Kanjeng Ratu Sekar Kedhaton upon reaching adulthood and married to Mangkunegara III.

Not long after her death, he married Gusti Kanjeng Ratu Kencana. Her parents were Raden Mas Tumenggung Arya Kusumadiningrat and Bendara Raden Ayu Kusumadiningrat (née Bendara Raden Ajeng Sentul), daughter of Pakubuwana III. Her father was a grandson of Amangkurat IV through Kanjeng Pangeran Arya Hadiwijaya. She gave birth to the potential heir, Gusti Raden Mas Sakatah, who, unfortunately, died young.

One of his concubines was Raden Ayu Sasrakusuma, a daughter of Raden Tumenggung Cakradipura II by his primary wife, Raden Ayu Cakradipura, daughter of Kanjeng Raden Adipati Sasradiningrat II, the Patih Dalem (r. 1812 – 1846). She was the mother of his heir, Pakubuwana VI.

== Family ==
Royal Consorts

1. Gusti Kanjeng Ratu Hemas (died 1821), a first cousin once removed of the Susuhunan, member of the Jayaningrat household. She was a great-granddaughter of Pakubuwana III and later the Gusti Kanjeng Ratu Hageng (Queen Dowager).
2. Gusti Kanjeng Ratu Kencana, a first cousin of the Susuhunan, member of the Kusumadiningrat household. She was a granddaughter of Pakubuwana III.

Notable Concubine

1. Raden Ayu Sasrakusuma, member of the Cakradipura household. She was the mother of Pakubuwana VI.

Children

1. Bendara Raden Mas Sulaiman
  son of R. Dewakusuma, died young.
2. Bendara Raden Ajeng Untari
  daughter of R. Nrangkusuma, died young.
3. Bendara Raden Mas Radeya
  son of MAy. Mayangsari, died young.
4. Bendara Raden Mas Duksina
  son of R. Sasrakusuma, died young.
5. Bendara Raden Mas Kasan Besari
  son of R. Nrangkusuma, died young.
6. Bendara Raden Ajeng Sumiyah
  daughter of R. P. Wangsengsari, died young.
7. Gusti Raden Ajeng Kabibah
  daughter of GKR. Hemas, styled as Gusti Kanjeng Ratu Sekar Kedhaton. Married to Kanjeng Gusti Pangeran Adipati Arya Mangkunegara III.
8. Bendara Raden Mas Subarda
  son of R. Dewabrata, died young.
9. Gusti Raden Mas Sakatah
  son of GKR. Kencana, died young.
10. name unrecorded
  born to MAy. Mayangsari, died young.
11. Bendara Raden Mas Sapardan (1807 - 1849)
  son of R. Sasrakusuma, appointed as the Kanjeng Gusti Pangeran Adipati Anom Hamengkunegara (Crown Prince) of Surakarta, succeeded as Pakubuwana VI.
12. Bendara Raden Mas Abuyamin
  son of R. Dewabrata, styled as Bendara Kanjeng Pangeran Harya Suryabrata I.
13. Bendara Raden Mas Respati
  son of R. Sulendra, died young.
14. Bendara Raden Mas Sulasikin
  son of R. Dewakusuma, died young.
15. Bendara Raden Ajeng Sangibah
  daughter of R. Ragaswara. Married to Raden Mas Harya Mangkudipura.
16. Bendara Raden Mas Sangadi
  son of MAy. Mayangsari, styled as Bendara Kanjeng Pangeran Harya Natabrata I.
17. Bendara Raden Mas Sadalsah
  son of R. Esmubrata, died young.
18. Bendara Raden Mas Munada
  son of R. Wilasmara, styled as Bendara Kanjeng Pangeran Harya Natadiningrat.
19. Bendara Raden Mas Abuyahman
  son of R. Dewabrata, died young.
20. Bendara Raden Ajeng Sawiyah
  daughter of R. P. Wangsengsari, died young.
21. Bendara Raden Mas Suparman
  son of R. Riya Dananjaya, styled as Bendara Kanjeng Pangeran Harya Santakusuma I.
22. Bendara Raden Mas Subarja
  son of R. Dewakusuma, styled as Bendara Kanjeng Pangeran Harya Kusumabrata I.
23. Bendara Raden Mas Yahuda
  son of MAy. Ranusari, styled as Bendara Kanjeng Pangeran Harya Pringgakusuma.
24. Bendara Raden Mas Iman Semantri
  son of R. Esmubrata, died young.
25. Bendara Raden Mas Sema'un
  son of R. Sulendra, styled as Bendara Kanjeng Pangeran Harya Suryaningrat.
26. Bendara Raden Mas Suwarya
  son of R. P. Wangsengsari, died young.
27. Bendara Raden Ajeng Sasmaniyah
  son of R. Wilasmara. Married to Bendara Pangeran Harya Dipawinata.
28. Bendara Raden Ajeng Subandinah
  daughter of R. Sasrakusuma, died young.
29. Bendara Raden Ajeng Salbiyah
  daughter of R. Esmubrata, died young.
30. Bendara Raden Ajeng Katijah
  daughter of R. Dewakusuma, died young.
31. Bendara Raden Mas Sahirya
  son of MAy. Citrasari, died young.
32. Bendara Raden Ajeng Sawaliyah
  daughter of R. Dewabrata, died young.
33. Bendara Raden Mas Samadiman
  son of R. Malayasari, styled as Bendara Kanjeng Pangeran Tumenggung Sindusena.
34. Bendara Raden Mas Sumarya
  son of R. Sulendra, died young.
35. Bendara Raden Ajeng Sangidah
  daughter of MAy. Mayangsari. Married to Bendara Raden Mas Panji Nata Atmaja, son of Bendara Kanjeng Pangeran Harya Natapura, son of Pakubuwana IV.
36. Bendara Raden Ajeng Samsiyah
  daughter of MAy. Tunjungsari. Married to Raden Mas Major Prawirawinata.
37. Bendara Raden Ajeng Murtasiyah
  daughter of R. Dewaasmara. Married to Raden Mas Major Hadiwinata.
38. Bendara Raden Ajeng Sariyah
  daughter of MAy. Kudasrenggara, died young.
39. Bendara Raden Ajeng Kadisah
  daughter of R. Wiraswara. Married to Raden Mas Major Yudhawinata.
40. Bendara Raden Mas Sukirman
  son of MAy. Kudatilarsa, styled as Bendara Kanjeng Pangeran Panji Suryadipura.
41. Bendara Raden Mas Murtasinah
  daughter of R. Dewaasmara.
42. name unrecorded
  born to MAy. Carangcuwiri.
43. Bendara Raden Mas Sla
  son of R. P. Jayengkusuma, styled as Bendara Kanjeng Pangeran Harya Suryakusuma.
44. Bendara Raden Ajeng Samaniyah
  daughter of R. Ranggakusuma. Married to Bendara Pangeran Harya Harya Atmaja.
45. Bendara Raden Ajeng Sriyandi
  daughter of MAy. Warsiki, died young.

== Titles ==
- During the reign of Pakubuwana III (r. 1732 – 1788)
  - Bendara Raden Mas Sugandhi (from 13 December 1784)
- During the reign of Pakubuwana IV (r. 1788 – 1820)
  - Gusti Raden Mas Sugandhi (from 29 September 1788)
  - Kanjeng Gusti Pangeran Adipati Anom Sudibya Rajaputra Narendra Mataram ingkang Kaping III ing Surakarta Hadiningrat (from 13 August 1792)
  - Kanjeng Gusti Pangeran Adipati Anom Hamengkunegara Sudibya Rajaputra Narendra Mataram ingkang Kaping III ing Surakarta Hadiningrat (from 11 July 1796)
- During his reign as Pakubuwana V (r. 1820 – 1823)
  - Sampeyan Dalem Ingkang Sinuhun Kanjeng Susuhunan Pakubuwana Senapati ing Ngalaga Abdurrahman Sayyidin Panatagama Ingkang Jumeneng Kaping V (from 10 October 1820)

== Ancestry ==
Ancestors of Pakubuwono V

Pakubuwana II
Pakubuwana III
Gusti Kanjeng Ratu Hemas
Pakubuwana IV
Raden Tumenggung Wirareja
Gusti Kanjeng Ratu Kencana
Pakubuwana V
Raden Harya Hadikara
Raden Adipati Cakradiningrat
Gusti Kanjeng Ratu Pakubuwana
Panembahan Adipati Cakraningrat V
Raden Ayu Adipati Cakradiningrat

== Notes ==
Preceded by Pakubuwono IV	Susuhunan of Surakarta; 1820–1823	Succeeded by Pakubuwono VI
