= Girimulya Surakarta =

Section of royal cemetery in Java, Indonesia

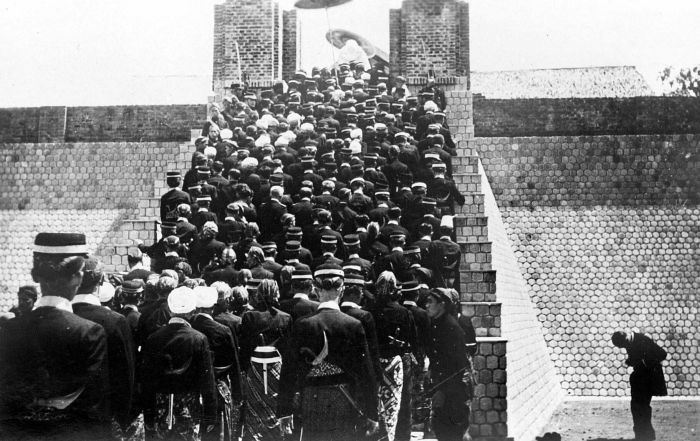
Pakubuwono X's burial in 1939 – Javanese entering the upper portion of the Girimulya section

Girimulya Surakarta is the section of the Imogiri royal graveyard in Yogyakarta Indonesia, that houses the graves of the most recent rulers of Surakarta.

It is the westernmost section of the graveyard. Sultan Agungan is at the centre – and the northernmost section. Pakubuwono X of Surakarta constructed this section of the graveyard prior to his death.

It houses the graves of Pakubuwono XI, Pakubuwono XII and close relatives.

Its entrance area was damaged during the severe earthquake in Bantul in the 2006 Yogyakarta earthquake
