= Pakubuwono VII =

Susuhunan of Surakarta

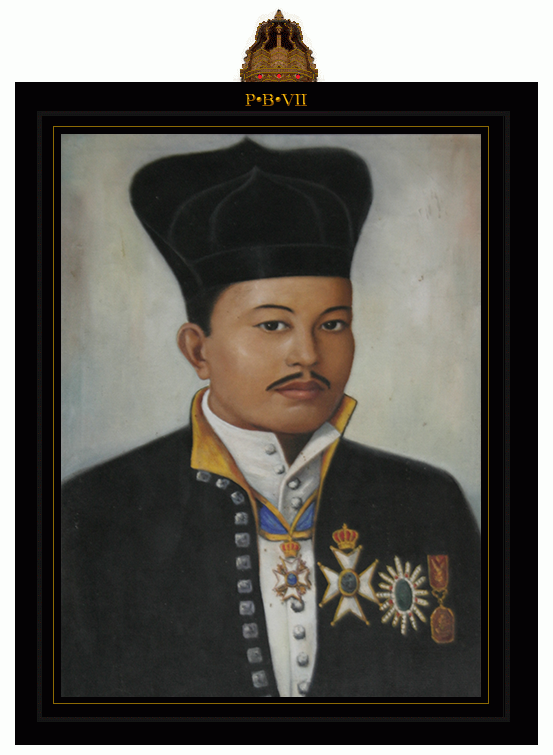

Susuhunan of Surakarta
- Reign: 14 June 1830 – 10 May 1858
- Coronation: 14 June 1830
- Predecessor: Pakubuwana VI
- Successor: Pakubuwana VIII
- Born: Gusti Raden Mas Malik-i-Salikin; 28 July 1796; Surakarta, Surakarta Sunanate
- Died: 10 May 1858 (aged 61); Surakarta, Surakarta Sunanate
- Burial: Kapingsangan Tomb, Imogiri Royal Cemetery, Imogiri, Yogyakarta Sultanate
- Spouses: Gusti Kanjeng Ratu Kencana (before 1830) Gusti Kanjeng Ratu Pakubuwana of Madura (m. 1834)
- Issue more...: Gusti Kanjeng Ratu Pembayun
Regnal name
- Sampeyan Dalem Ingkang Sinuhun Kanjeng Susuhunan Pakubuwana Senapati ing Ngalaga Abdurrahman Sayyidin Panatagama Khalifatullah Ingkang Jumeneng Kaping VII
- House: Mataram
- Father: Pakubuwana IV
- Mother: Gusti Kanjeng Ratu Kencana Wungu

Pakubuwono VII (also transliterated Pakubuwana VII) (28 July 1796 – 10 May 1858) was the sixth Susuhunan (ruler of Surakarta) from 1830 to 1858. He was a younger son of Pakubuwono IV.

== Early life ==
He was born in Surakarta on July 28, 1796, son of the reigning Sunan Pakubuwana IV by his queen consort, Gusti Kanjeng Ratu Kencana. Although he was the son of the reigning queen consort, his father favored his elder stepbrother, as the heir-apparent; he was the future Pakubuwana V, a son born to the late crown princess consort who was later posthumously elevated to the queen consort.

As a senior prince, he was later designated the princely title of Kanjeng Gusti Pangeran Adipati Harya Purbaya, and was deeply loved by his step-older brother. Since the lack of producing a male heir from his queen consorts, before his death, Pakubuwana V sent his will to the Resident of Surakarta, aiming to name Prince Purbaya as his successor, as he was also born from the queen consort. However, hearing the news, the Patih Dalem, Kanjeng Raden Adipati Sasradiningrat II, came to remind him that descendants' inheritance took precedence over siblings, unless he denied the filial status of those princes, which the Sunan answered by explaining that his oldest son (concubine-born) was only seventeen years old and so still not capable of ruling. Then, Patih Sasradiningrat II promised that he would always assist the young heir-apparent and told the Resident of Surakarta about the turn. Prince Purbaya wasn't angry; he was touched and supported his brother's decision. His time came when his nephew, Pakubuwana VI, was arrested by the Dutch and exiled to Ambon. Afterwards, Patih Sasradiningrat II proposed that he ascend the throne because the sons of Pakubuwana VI were very, very young.

== Personal life ==
He had two official wives. The first was whom he married since he was a prince, named Raden Ayu Adipati Purbaya, a daughter of his uncle, Kanjeng Gusti Pangeran Adipati Mangkubumi, son of Pakubuwana III. She was styled as Gusti Kanjeng Ratu Kencana upon his ascension. After his ascension, he married his second queen consort, Gusti Kanjeng Ratu Pakubuwana, daughter of Panembahan Cakradiningrat VIII of Madura by his primary wife, Kanjeng Ratu Ayunan. She died on December 3, 1865. One of his most senior concubines was Raden Ayu Ratnadiluwih, daughter of Raden Mas Sumadirja, son of Kanjeng Raden Adipati Jayaningrat, who served as Patih Dalem during the reign of Pakubuwana III & Pakubuwana IV.

== Family ==
Royal Consorts

- Gusti Kanjeng Ratu Kencana, a first cousin of the Susuhunan, member of the Mangkubumi household.
  - Gusti Raden Mas Budiman, died young.
  - Gusti Raden Ajeng Andawiyah, styled as Gusti Kanjeng Ratu Pembayun.
  - Gusti Raden Ajeng Isbandiyah, died young.
- Gusti Kanjeng Ratu Pakubuwana (died 1865), married in 1834, a second cousin of the Susuhunan, member of the Cakraningrat household.

Concubine

- Raden Ayu Rêtnadiluwih
  - Bendara Raden Ajeng Maknawiyah
    - Married to her first cousin, Bendara Kanjeng Pangeran Harya Suryaningrat, son of Pakubuwana V.
    - Married Kanjeng Raden Adipati Sasradiningrat III
  - Bendara Raden Mas Sarjana, died young.

== Ancestry ==
Ancestors of Pakubuwono VII

Pakubuwana II
Pakubuwana III
Gusti Kanjeng Ratu Hemas
Pakubuwana IV
Raden Tumenggung Wirareja
Gusti Kanjeng Ratu Kencana
Pakubuwana VII
Raden Harya Hadikara
Raden Adipati Cakradiningrat
Gusti Kanjeng Ratu Kencana Wungu
Panembahan Adipati Cakraningrat V
Raden Ayu Adipati Cakradiningrat

Preceded by Pakubuwono VI	Susuhunan of Surakarta; 1830–1858	Succeeded by Pakubuwono VIII
