= Pakubuwono VIII =

Susuhunan of Surakarta

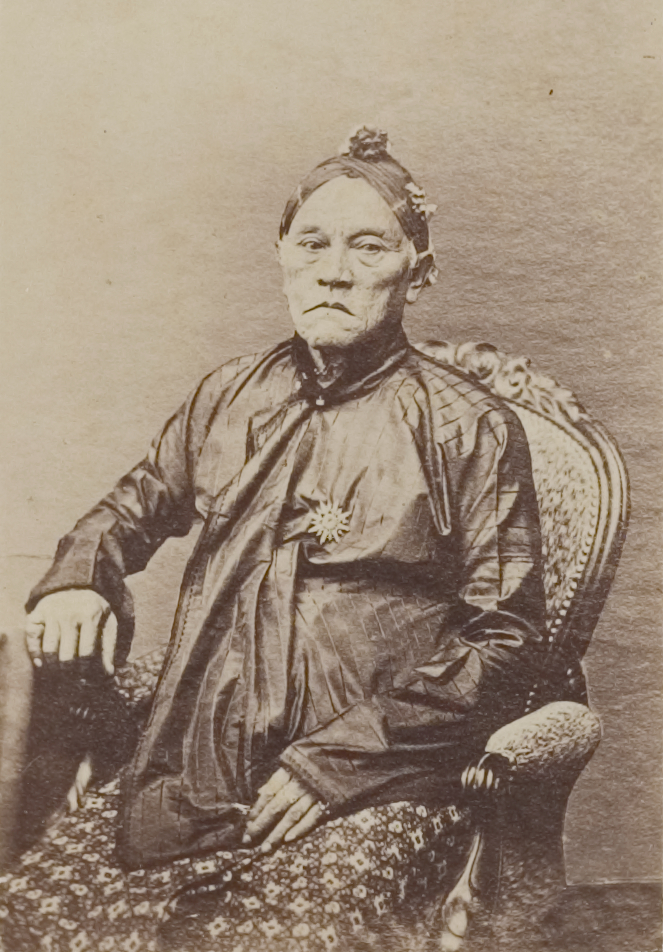
- Pakubuwono VIII c. 1860

Susuhunan of Surakarta
- Reign: 1858–1861
- Coronation: 17 May 1858
- Predecessor: Pakubuwana VII
- Successor: Pakubuwana IX
- Born: Bendara Raden Mas Kusen; 20 May 1789; Surakarta, Surakarta Sunanate
- Died: 28 December 1861 (aged 72); Surakarta, Surakarta Sunanate
- Burial: Kapingsangan Tomb, Imogiri Royal Cemetery, Imogiri, Yogyakarta Sultanate
- Spouse: Gusti Kanjeng Ratu Pakubuwana (m. 1807)
- Issue: Gusti Kanjeng Ratu Kencana/Gusti Kanjeng Ratu Kedhaton; Gusti Kanjeng Ratu Bendara; Gusti Kanjeng Ratu Kencana/Gusti Kanjeng Ratu Hamengkubuwana; Gusti Kanjeng Ratu Hangger
Regnal name
- Sampeyan Dalem Ingkang Sinuhun Kanjeng Susuhunan Pakubuwana Senapati ing Ngalaga Abdurrahman Sayyidin Panatagama Khalifatullah Ingkang Jumeneng Kaping VIII
- House: Mataram
- Father: Pakubuwana IV
- Mother: Mas Ayu Rantansari

Pakubuwono VIII (the other name's Bandara Radin Mas Kuseini)(also transliterated Pakubuwana VIII) (born 20 April 1789 – ruled 1858 until 28 December 1861) was the seventh Susuhunan (ruler of Surakarta) from 1858 to 1861. He was the elder brother of Pakubuwano VII.

== Early life ==
He was the eldest concubine-born son of Pakubuwana IV. His mother was Mas Ayu Rantansari, a daughter of Ngabehi Jayakartika.

== Reign ==
Pakubuwana VIII ascended the throne on August 17, 1858, succeeding his half-brother, Pakubuwana VII, who had passed away the previous month. He took the throne at an advanced age of 69, as Pakubuwana VII had died without a crown prince. Notably, he was the first monarch of the House of Mataram who did not practice polygamy.

His reign lasted only three years until his death, making him the shortest-reigning ruler of Surakarta. Pakubuwana VIII was succeeded by the son of Pakubuwana VI, who took the title Pakubuwana IX as the next Susuhunan of Surakarta.

== Personal life ==
His primary consort was his first cousin, Bendara Raden Ajeng Ngaisah, styled as Bendara Raden Ayu Hangabehi. She was a daughter of Kanjeng Pangeran Harya Purbanegara of Kediri by his primary consort, Gusti Raden Ayu Purbonegara. Her father was the eight son of Mangkunegara I and her mother was the twenty first daughter of Pakubuwana III born to his queen consort, Gusti Kanjeng Ratu Kencana, as well as younger sister to Pakubuwana IV. They had four daughters.

1. Raden Ajeng Kusniyah, styled Gusti Kanjeng Ratu Kencana, ex-principal consort of Pakubuwana VI. Married for the second times to Kanjeng Pangeran Harya Juru Nataningrat, son Kanjeng Gusti Pangeran Adipati Mangkubumi I, son of Pakubuwana III, and changed her name to Gusti Kanjeng Ratu Bendara. Upon her father ascension, renamed as Gusti Kanjeng Ratu Kedhaton.
2. Raden Ajeng Kusinah, styled Gusti Kanjeng Ratu Bendara. Married to Kanjeng Pangeran Harya Hadiwijaya III, younger brother of Mangkunegara IV. She was the mother of Gusti Kanjeng Ratu Pakubuwana, principal consort of Pakubuwana IX.
3. Raden Ajeng Kuspiyah or Raden Ajeng Dablêg, styled Gusti Kanjeng Ratu Kencana. She was a principal consort of Hamengkubuwana VI of Yogyakarta, later styled Gusti Kanjeng Ratu Hamengkubuwana.
4. Raden Ajeng Kuspinah or Raden Ajeng Prêkis, styled Gusti Kanjeng Ratu Hangger. Married Colonel Kanjeng Pangeran Harya Purbanegara.

She died before his ascension. Later, in 1860, he ordered to renamed her grave, Bendara Raden Ayu Adipati Hangabehi to Kanjeng Ratu Pakubuwana, queen consort to Pakubuwana VIII.

== Ancestry ==
Ancestors of Pakubuwono VIII

Pakubuwana II
Pakubuwana III
Gusti Kanjeng Ratu Hemas
Pakubuwana IV
Raden Tumenggung Wirareja
Gusti Kanjeng Ratu Kencana
Pakubuwana VIII
Ngabehi Jayakartika
Mas Ayu Rantansari

Preceded by Pakubuwono VII	Susuhunan of Surakarta; 1858–1861	Succeeded by Pakubuwono IX
