= Susuhunan =

Royal title of monarchies in present-day Indonesia

Radya Laksana, the emblem of Surakarta Sunanate

Susuhunan, or in short version Sunan, is a title used by the monarchs of Mataram Sultanate and then by the hereditary rulers of Surakarta Sunanate.

Additionally in Bali and Surakarta, so-called "King of Kings" reigned with this title, while their kingdoms were called "Sunanates".

The name Susuhunan is also used as a romantic nickname for loved ones, but also for highly respected public figures. Lovers or mistresses were also referred to with this nickname outside in private. The abbreviation Sunan is also used as a given name.

== Names and titles ==
The full title of the Susuhunan of Surakarta in Javanese is: Sahandhap Sampeyandalem ingkang Sinuhun Kangjeng Susuhunan Paku Buwana Senapati ing Alaga Ngabdurrahman Sayyidin Panatagama ("His Exalted Majesty, The Susuhunan Paku Buwana, Commander in the Field of Battle, Servant of the Most Gracious, the Regulator of Religion"). This long title is occasionally abbreviated in media with Latin texts as SSISKS, denoting Sahandhap Sampeyandalem Ingkang Sinuhun Kangjeng Susuhunan, followed by the regnal name.

The rulers of Surakarta traditionally adopt the regnal name Pakubuwono (also spelled Pakubuwana Javanese pronunciation: [pakubuwɔnɔ]). Susuhunan is specific to the rulers of Surakarta; the rulers of Yogyakarta, who are also descended from the Mataram dynasty, have the title Sultan.

== List of Susuhunans of Surakarta ==
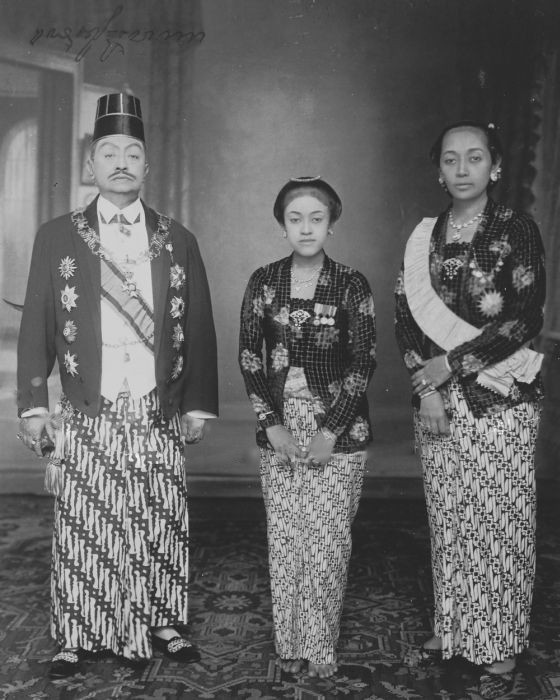
Susuhunan Pakubuwono X and his family.

The dates given are for the time ruling.

- Pakubuwono II, 1727–1749 (Kartasura and Surakarta)
- Pakubuwono III, 1749–1788
- Pakubuwono IV, 1788–1820
- Pakubuwono V, 1820–1823
- Pakubuwono VI, 1823–1830
- Pakubuwono VII, 1830–1858
- Pakubuwono VIII, 1859–1861
- Pakubuwono IX, 1861–1893
- Pakubuwono X, 1893–1939
- Pakubuwono XI, 1939–1945
- Pakubuwono XII, 1945–2004
- Pakubuwono XIII, 2004–2025
- Pakubuwono XIV, since 2025

Note: For Pakubuwono XIII - from 2004 to 2012, there were two rival claimants to the throne, Hangabehi and Tedjowulan, both are sons of late Pakubuwono XII., And for Pakubuwono XIV, there are two rival claimants as of 2025, KGPA Hangabehi and KGPA Purbaya, both sons of the late Pakubuwono XIII

== List of Susuhunans of Bali ==
- Ida I Dewa Agung Jambe (1686 - 1722)
- Ida I Dewa Agung Made (1722 - 1736)
- Ida I Dewa Agung Dimadya (1736 - 1760)
- Ida I Dewa Agung Sakti (1760 - 1790)
- Ida I Dewa Agung Surawirya Putra I (1790 - 1809)
- Ida I Dewa Agung Surawirya Putra II (1814 - 1850)
- Ida I Dewa Agung Surawirya Putra III (1851 - 1903)
- Ida I Dewa Agung Surawirya Putra IV (1904 - 1908)
- Ida I Dewa Agung Oka Geg (1929 - 1951)
- Ida Dalem Semaraputra (2010 - present)

== See also ==
- Hamengkubuwono
- Sunan
- List of monarchs of Java
