= Pakubuwono IV =

Susuhunan of Surakarta

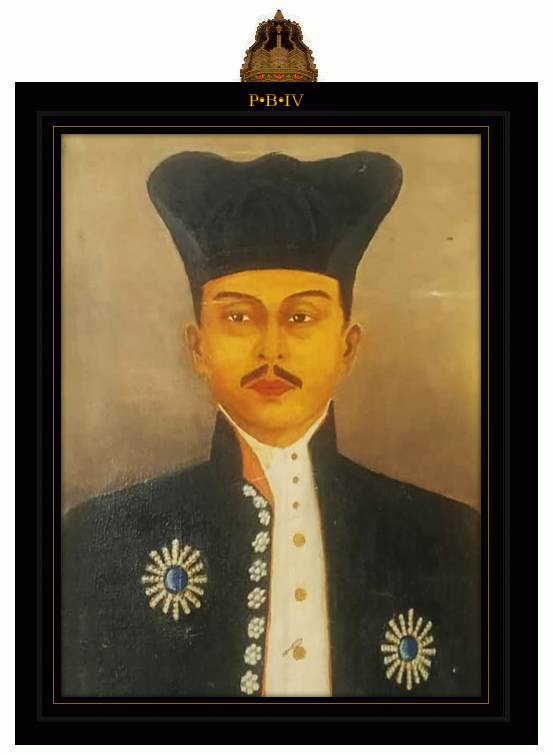

Susuhunan of Surakarta
- Reign: 1788–1820
- Coronation: 29 September 1788
- Predecessor: Pakubuwana III
- Successor: Pakubuwana V
- Born: Raden Mas Gusti Subadya; 31 August 1768; Surakarta, Surakarta Sunanate
- Died: 1 October 1820 (aged 52); Surakarta, Surakarta Sunanate
- Spouses: Gusti Kanjeng Ratu Pakubuwana (m. 1783; died 1785); Gusti Kanjeng Ratu Kencana Wungu (m. 1791)
- Issue more...: Pakubuwana V; Pakubuwana VII; Pakubuwana VIII
Regnal name
- Sampeyan Dalem Ingkang Sinuhun Kanjeng Susuhunan Pakubuwana Senapati ing Ngalaga Abdurrahman Sayyidin Panatagama Khalifatullah Ingkang Jumeneng Kaping IV
- House: Mataram
- Father: Pakubuwana III
- Mother: Gusti Kanjeng Ratu Kencana Beruk

Pakubuwono IV (also transliterated Pakubuwana IV) (31 August 1768 – 1 October 1820) was the third Susuhunan (ruler of Surakarta). He reigned from 1788 to 1820.

== Early life ==
He was born in 1768 (1694 AJ) as Raden Mas Gusti Subadya, the eldest son of Pakubuwana III born to his second queen consort, Gusti Kanjeng Ratu Kencana. She was originally a bedhaya dancer, namely Bok Lara Bêruk or Mas Rara Bêruk, a commoner daughter of Kyai Ngabehi Jagaswara, later elevated to Raden Tumenggung Wirareja.

In 1700 AJ, he was appointed as heir-apparent.

== Reign ==
People called him Sunan Bagus because of his handsome appearance; moreover, he ascended the throne at the young age of 20 in 1788.

Unlike his father, he was a competent ruler with big ambitions. As a devout Muslims, he appointed four clerics as his trusted advisors; they were: Tumenggung Wiradigda, Kyai Bahman, Kyai Panengah, and Kyai Nur Sholeh. Another source also included Tumenggung Sujanaprana. This action triggered tension between him and the court senior officials, as many of them believed in mystique. The clerics had a great influence on his decision, such as forbidding alcohol and opium, war exercises every Saturday, and changing the soldiers' Dutch clothing into Javanese. He would go to the Kasunan mosque to perform Friday prayer, and sometimes act as khatib. If they, the palace officials, didn't comply with religious teachings, they were prosecuted, removed, and even dismissed, as experienced by Tumenggung Pringgalaya and Tumenggung Mangkuyudha. The VOC, along with Yogyakarta and Mangkunegaran, were worried about his new regulations. From September 16 until October 10, 1790, the VOC sent a delegation led by Jan Greeve, the Governor and Director of Java’s Noord-en Ooskust, demand the handover of the four clerics. As the negotiation failed, the palace was surrounded in all directions by the VOC, Yogyakarta, and Mangkunegaran soldiers. Only with the advice from Raden Ngabehi Yasadipura I, he finally agreed to hand over them, so that the siege was lifted. Through Prince Purbaya, Prince Mangkubumi, and Prince Bumi Nata, the clerics were handed over to the Dutch fort on November 26, 1790, and, fortunately, because of his earlier argument on their behalf, they weren't executed.

In 1812, he was involved in the outbreak of the Sack of Yogyakarta, widely known as Geger Sepehi or "Sepoy". The name referred to soldiers, mostly Indian infantrymen armed in the British East India Company. The starting point was actually the internal conflict between Hamengkubuwana II and the Adipati Anom, since the heir appointment was done by the intervention of Hamengkubuwana I. This divided the Yogyakarta court into two factions, one supporting the Sultan and another supporting the Adipati Anom. The Adipati Anom was more welcome to the Dutch; as a result, after the anti-Dutch rebellion rose, Daendels forced the Sultan to make the crown prince as the regent, which he had to agree. In late 1811, as the Dutch were defeated, Hamengkubuwana II deposed him as regent but still a crown prince.

Hamengkubuwana II wasn't in a good relationship with the British. Sunan Pakubuwana IV saw an opportunity, sent the Patih Dalem, Kanjeng Raden Adipati Cakranegara, to meet the Adipati Anom and Prince Natakusuma to express his support. He also ordered Raden Tumenggung Ranawijaya and Raden Tumenggung Sasradiningrat to formulate a strategy with the Sultan by correspondence. The Sunan promised support and troops if Yogyakarta and the British went to war. Prince Natakusuma, aware of the Sultan and Sunan's collaboration in rebelling, immediately reported it to Crawfurd. Subsequently, Crawfurd told Raffles to overthrow the Sultan and install the crown prince instead.

He was also in conflict with Mangkunegaran. He was originally intended to marry his eldest daughter, Ratu Pembayun, to Mangkunegara II. However, a month before the marriage, he followed the advice from the senior and junior princes of Surakarta who opposed the marriage. They argued that bringing her lungguh estate of 75 jungs of rice fields, if she died, the land would remain with the Mangkunegaran rather than revert to the Kasunanan. They urged that she should marry a prince of Kasunanan. As a result, she married her first cousin, Kanjeng Pangeran Adipati Arya Mangkubumi. Her marriage enraged Mangkunegara II; he ordered his troops to attack Surakarta. However, his patih, Raden Tumenggung Mangkureja, persuaded him to come to Batavia and seek support from Raffles. Raffles asked him about a letter from Prince Adipati Anom of Yogyakarta, telling about the rulers of Yogyakarta and Surakarta were planning to rebel. Mangkunegara II supported the British invasion of Yogyakarta and offered to subdue Surakarta himself.

In the morning on June 16, 1812, the British troops performed a demonstration at the Surakarta town square, made the young Sunan tremble, and eventually betrayed his ally, sending four hundred Surakarta soldiers to Yogyakarta. Four days later, Sultan Hamengkubuwana II was defeated and exiled to Penang. Afterwards, the Adipati Anom ascended the throne as Hamengkubuwana III, and Prince Natakusuma was appointed as Paku Alam I.

The patih dalem who served in office during his reign were listed below.

1. Kanjeng Raden Adipati Jayaningrat (r. 1784 - 1796)
2. Kanjeng Raden Adipati Mangkupraja II (r. 1796 - 1804)
3. Kanjeng Raden Adipati Danuningrat (r. 1804 - 1810)
4. Kanjeng Raden Adipati Cakranagara (r. 1810 - 1812)
5. Kanjeng Raden Adipati Sasradiningrat II (r. 1812 - 1846)

== Works ==
He was also known a great artist. Before his ascension, he created the newer version of the legend of Ramayana with the elder version as reference. On November 1781 (Dulkaidah 1707 AJ), he composed the melody of the sacred song Duradasih or Doradasih which would later accompany the bedhaya dance, Bedhaya Duradasih.

In his advanced age, he wrote the famous Serat Wulangreh. He inherited his ancient wayang collections among his sons, Kyai Mangu to Kanjeng Gusti Pangeran Adipati Arya Kusumayuda and Kyai Kanyut to Kanjeng Pangeran Arya Natapura.

== Appearance ==
In 1956, at Prabuwinatan's residence, Raden Mas Riya Danuningrat read Gusti Pangeran Harya Hadiwijaya's recording of their ancestors, one of them was his father's description of their grandfather, Sunan Bagus. He was rather short and had a wide mouth, but he enhanced his appearance. His teeth carved the shape of cucumber seeds and with gold every Thursday, but were already erased by the next morning because he was about to go to Friday prayer like a pilgrimage. He wore tight white Napoleon-style pants. He wanted a ngodhèg ngudhup turi hairstyle, so he ordered Purbadipura (Purbacaraka's father) to be the hairstylist. Besides being well known as Ingkang Sinuhun Bagus, he was also called Sinuhun Yasa Cêmani.

== Personal life ==
Pakubuwana IV's romantic story with the princesses of Madura was told in Bedaya Duradasih, a classical dance whose accompanying lyrics he created personally. However, the narrative was more likely intended for his first wife, since the work was created in 1781 (1707 AJ).

The story began when he was still a crown prince or Adipati Anom, when his father, Pakubuwana III, brought Raden Ajeng Handaya, daughter of Adipati Cakradiningrat of Pamekasan, to the court to be trained in palace customs, with the intention that she would later be matched with the Adipati Anom. The arrangement was a part of long political marriages between Mataram and Madura since the reign of Sultan Agung.

Later on, the Sunan summoned them; however, she was declined by the Adipati Anom because he had no interest in Handaya, describing her as unattractive, dark-skinned, and possessing a voice likened to that of a man. Sunan Pakubuwana III, who was disappointed with his son, undertook an ascetic retreat and prayed to transform Handaya into a beautiful lady. He received a divine revelation that Handaya should perform fasting and bathe each morning before sunrise with flower-infused water. The bath must be performed using golden bokor as her bathing vessel and with the help of an elder woman at least the rank of Nyai Mas Tumenggung, who has discipline in fasting. In addition, she was also required to drink jamu. Afterwards, a miracle happened; she turned into an extraordinary beauty.

The Sunan summoned them both again, but he refused her once more, having already fallen in love with the lady opposite him without realizing it was her, as his father didn't tell. After he truly fell and expressed his desire to marry her, the Sunan granted him marriage. They married in May 1783 (1709 AJ). As the primary wife of Adipati Anom, Handaya was officially named Raden Ayu Adipati Anom. Upon learning the truth, he continued the marriage in happiness.

She died in August 1785 (1711 AJ) leaving their only child, Raden Mas Gusti Sugandhi (the future Pakubuwana V) who was still an infant. Her death was caused by smallpox. In his grief, he made a special request to allow her body to be buried in the porch of Kasunanan Surakarta Mosque in Laweyan instead of Astana Pajimatan Imogiri, reserved for the Mataram monarch and his immediate family descendants. Most likely, the reason was because of the distance, as Laweyan is closer to Surakarta. He visited her cemetery everyday at the first forty days after her death date, and continued until he stopped when his father died, which means he would be crowned as the next monarch and wasn't allowed to visit the cemetery again.

In 1888, he ascended the throne as Pakubuwana IV. Upon his ascension, he posthumously elevated her to Gusti Kanjeng Ratu Kencana.

He was ready to remarried after the Pakepung incident in 1790. A letter from Yogyakarta offered him a marriage with Bendara Raden Ajeng Saelah, a daughter of Kanjeng Gusti Pangeran Adipati Anom (the future Hamengkubuwana III). Nevertheless, he remembered his late father will, not allowed him to marry a princess of Yogyakarta. Yasadipura I told His Majesty's uncle, Prince Purbaya that perhaps it was because the late Pakubuwana III remembered that his son already had a son with the late Madura princess, worrying another marriage to the Yogyakarta princess could lead a dispute. On the other hand, Purbaya was strongly supported the marriage, believed that it could reunite the Mataram family, and ready to come by himself for negotiation, if needed. He was disappointed since knowing His Majesty already proposed to another Madura princess.

In a sororate marriage in 1791, he married Raden Ajeng Sakaptinah, the late princess consort's younger sister, and installed her as queen consort, named as Gusti Kanjeng Ratu Kencana.

Due to his fondness for his late wife, he made an unusual decision by appointing Handaya's son as the crown prince in 1792. This is very important since the Mataram generally favored a son born to the reigning primary consort after the monarch's ascension (queen consort), although born younger, ahead in the line of succession over a son of the primary consort before his ascension (princess consort). The principles could be observed later by the time Mangkunegara IV chose Mangkunegara V, a son of his second primary consort, as the heir, stating his eldest son born to his first primary consort as a soldier's son. And the same rule for Pakubuwana XII's precedence over his elder half-brother, Kanjeng Gusti Pangeran Harya Mangkubumi.

His concubine, Mas Ayu Rantansari, was the mother of Pakubuwana VIII. She was a commoner, the daughter of Ngabehi Jayakartika. Another concubine, Raden Rêtnadiningsih, was a daughter of Raden Tumenggung Mangkuyuda III as well as the mother of an influential prince, Kanjeng Gusti Pangeran Adipati Arya Kusumayuda.

== Family ==
His royal consorts and some of the concubines were listed below.

Royal consorts

- Kanjeng Raden Ayu Adipati Anom Hamengkunegara (Principal Consort of the Crown Prince) of Surakarta (born Raden Ajeng Handaya, died 1785), member of the Cakraningrat household, married in 1783, posthumously elevated to Gusti Kanjeng Ratu Kencana, later Gusti Kanjeng Ratu Pakubuwana.
  - Raden Mas Gusti Sugandhi (1784 - 1823), appointed as the Kanjeng Gusti Pangeran Adipati Anom Hamengkunegara (Crown Prince) of Surakarta, succeeded as Pakubuwana V
- Gusti Kanjeng Ratu Kencana (born Raden Ajeng Sakaptina, died 1821), married in 1791, later the Gusti Kanjeng Ratu Hageng (Queen Dowager). She was the younger sister of Ratu Pakubuwana.
  - Gusti Kanjeng Ratu Pembayun
    - Married her first cousin, Kanjeng Gusti Pangeran (Prince) Adipati Mangkubumi II
  - Raden Mas Gusti Malik-i-Salikan (1796 - 1858), titled Kanjeng Gusti Pangeran (Prince) Adipati Purbaya, succeeded as Pakubuwana VII

Concubines

- Mas Ayu Rantansari
  - Bendara Raden Mas Kuseini (1789 - 1861), titled Bendara Kanjeng Pangeran (Prince) Hangabehi, elevated to Kanjeng Gusti Pangeran Adipati Hangabehi, succeeded as Pakubuwana VIII
- Raden Rêtnadiningsih
  - Bendara Raden Ajeng Gandawiyah
  - Bendara Raden Mas Ngamdani, titled Bendara Kanjeng Pangeran (Prince) Harya Kusumayuda, elevated to Kanjeng Gusti Pangeran Adipati Arya Kusumayuda
  - Bendara Raden Ajeng Marwiyah
  - Bendara Raden Ajeng Insiyah
- Raden Smaraningsih
  - Bendara Raden Ajeng Arkiyah
    - Married Raden Tumenggung Bratakusuma
  - Bendara Raden Ajeng Asiyah
  - Bendara Raden Mas Pirngadi, titled Bendara Kanjeng Pangeran (Prince) Harya Natabrata
  - Bendara Raden Mas Subaji, titled Bendara Kanjeng Pangeran (Prince) Harya Mlayakusuma, changed to Bendara Kanjeng Pangeran Harya Natakusuma
  - Bendara Raden Mas Ismangil, titled Bendara Kanjeng Pangeran (Prince) Harya Demang Tanpanangkil, changed to Bendara Kanjeng Pangeran Harya Jatikusuma
  - Bendara Raden Ajeng Ripangiyah
    - Married Bendara Kanjeng Pangeran (Prince) Harya Mangkudiningrat
- Raden Tisnasari
  - Bendara Raden Ajeng Maryam
- Mas Ayu Wêrdiningsih
  - Bendara Raden Mas Supadi
  - Bendara Raden Mas Untara, titled Bendara Kanjeng Pangeran (Prince) Harya Natapura
- Raden Rêngganingsih
  - Bendara Raden Ajeng Jaliyah
  - Bendara Raden Mas Ngusman
- Mbok Ajeng Timbrêng
  - Bendara Raden Ajeng Ngamimah
    - Married Padmadipura
  - Bendara Raden Ajeng Bidayah
    - Married Raden Mas Harya Kusumadiningrat, later Raden Mas Harya Jayadiningrat
- Mas Ajeng Wisarsa
  - Bendara Raden Ajeng Ngaisah
    - Married Raden Mas Harya Jayaningrat
  - Bendara Raden Ajeng Ngalimah
    - Married Kanjeng Raden Adipati Sasradiningrat III
  - Bendara Raden Mas Jayusman
  - Bendara Raden Mas Subarja, titled Bendara Kanjeng Pangeran (Prince) Harya Widura
- Mas Ajeng Wilarsa
  - Bendara Raden Mas Sadalsah
- Mbok Ajeng Tijah
  - Bendara Raden Mas Ngumar, titled Bendara Kanjeng Pangeran (Prince) Harya Jayakusuma
- Mas Ajeng Gandawati
  - Bendara Raden Mas Abubakar, titled Bendara Kanjeng Pangeran (Prince) Harya Balatêr
- Mbok Ajeng Wilet
  - Bendara Raden Ajeng Kamariyah
    - Married Raden Mas Harya Sasradiwirya
- Mas Ajeng Mintarsih
  - Bendara Raden Mas Ngali, titled Bendara Kanjeng Pangeran (Prince) Harya Pringgalaya
- Raden Pujaningsih
  - Bendara Raden Ajeng Karimah
    - Married Padmakusuma
  - Bendara Raden Mas Sasadara, titled Bendara Kanjeng Pangeran Panji Priyêmbada
- Mas Ajeng Widaningsih
  - Bendara Raden Mas Sardula, titled Bendara Kanjeng Pangeran (Prince) Panji Anom
- Mas Ayu Sukarsih

== Ancestry ==
Ancestors of Pakubuwono IV

Amangkurat IV
Pakubuwana II
Gusti Kanjeng Ratu Kencana
Pakubuwana III
Kanjeng Gusti Pangeran Adipati Purbaya
Gusti Kanjeng Ratu Hemas
Raden Ayu Pandhansari
Pakubuwana IV
Sutawijaya II
Tumenggung Wirareja
Gusti Kanjeng Ratu Kencana

== Notes ==
Preceded by Pakubuwono III	Susuhunan of Surakarta; 1788–1820	Succeeded by Pakubuwono V
