= Pakubuwono III =

Susuhunan of Surakarta

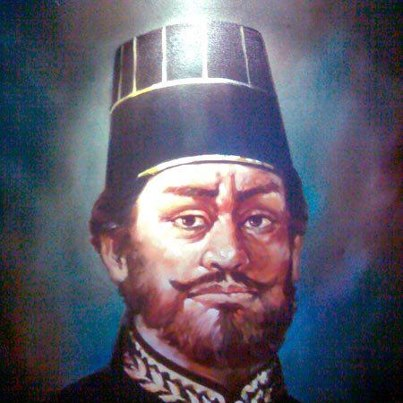
- Painting of Pakubuwana III, by unknown author.

Susuhunan of Surakarta
- Reign: 1755–1788
- Successor: Pakubuwana IV

Susuhunan of Mataram
- Reign: 1749 –1755
- Coronation: 15 December 1749
- Predecessor: Pakubuwana II
- Successor: position abolished
- Born: Raden Mas Gusti Suryadi; 24 February 1732; Kartasura Palace, Kartasura, Mataram Sultanate
- Died: 26 September 1788 (aged 56); Surakarta Palace, Surakarta, Surakarta Sunanate
- Spouse: Gusti Kanjeng Ratu Kencana of Cakraningratan (m. 1748); Gusti Kanjeng Ratu Kencana Beruk
- Issue more...: Pakubuwana IV
Regnal name
- Sampeyan Dalem Ingkang Sinuhun Kanjeng Susuhunan Pakubuwana Senapati ing Ngalaga Abdurrahman Sayyidin Panatagama Ingkang Jumeneng Kaping III
- House: Mataram
- Father: Pakubuwana II
- Mother: Gusti Kanjeng Ratu Hemas

Pakubuwono III (also transliterated Pakubuwana III) (1732–1788) was the second Susuhunan of Surakarta. Also known as Sinuhun Paliyan Negari, He was proclaimed by the Dutch as successor to his father in 1749 in accordance to his father's will, but with the ongoing Mataram's War of Succession, only when the Mataram Sultanate was officially divided through the Treaty of Giyanti into the Surakarta Sunanate and Yogyakarta Sultanate in 1755, was he officially proclaimed as the Susuhanan of Surakarta.

== Biography ==
He was the fifth son of Pakubuwana II, born to his queen consort, Kanjeng Ratu Mas, on February 25, 1732, at Kartasura Palace. His parents were first cousins; his mother was the youngest daughter of Pangeran Adipati Purbaya, younger brother of Amangkurat IV. His birthname was Raden Mas Gusti Suryadi, also known as Raden Mas Surat, Uret, and Sembada, later named Raden Mas Gusti Suryakusuma, then Kanjeng Gusti Pangeran Adipati Anom. He succeeded his father at the age of eighteen in 1749.

Pakubuwana III ascended the throne on 15 December 1749, succeeding his father, who was critically ill at the time. His appointment followed a controversial deathbed mandate from Pakubuwana II, which granted the Dutch East India Company (VOC) the authority to determine the royal succession. Consequently, he was formally installed as monarch by the VOC Governor, Baron von Hohendorff.

== Rebellions ==
=== Resistance of Prince Mangkubumi ===
Upon his accession, Pakubuwana III inherited a fractured kingdom embroiled in a rebellion led by his uncle, Prince Mangkubumi, which had persisted since 1746. On 12 December 1749, the rebels had already proclaimed Mangkubumi as the rival "Pakubuwana III" at their stronghold, appointing Pangeran Sambernyawa as his grand vizier (patih).

By 1752, a rift developed between Prince Mangkubumi and Pangeran Sambernyawa. The Dutch East India Company (VOC) exploited this division by offering a separate peace to Mangkubumi.

Negotiations culminated in the Treaty of Giyanti on 13 February 1755. Under this landmark agreement, Mangkubumi was recognized as a sovereign ruler over half of Pakubuwana III's territories. Although Mangkubumi had previously claimed the title of Susuhunan, the treaty forbade him from using it. Following a memorandum of understanding on 23 September 1754, he officially adopted the title of Sultan with the regnal name Hamengkubuwana I and established the Yogyakarta Sultanate.

Consequently, the Mataram Sultanate was formally divided into two principalities: the Surakarta Sunanate under Pakubuwana III and the Yogyakarta Sultanate under Hamengkubuwana I.

=== Resistance of Pangeran Sambernyawa ===
Following the Treaty of Giyanti, Pangeran Sambernyawa felt betrayed by Mangkubumi and continued his resistance against both Pakubuwana III and Hamengkubuwana I. However, as his forces weakened, he agreed to negotiate with the VOC starting in 1756.

In March 1757, Sambernyawa declared his loyalty to the VOC, Surakarta, and Yogyakarta through the Treaty of Salatiga. He assumed the title of Mangkunegara I and was granted a portion of territory by Pakubuwana III, establishing the autonomous Mangkunegaran Regency (Kadipaten Mangkunagaran).

== End of reign ==
The political weaknesses of Pakubuwana III caused tensions to rise across the island of Java. Rebel factions emerged, seeking to exert control over his administration. This volatile atmosphere persisted until his death on September 26, 1788.

Pakubuwana III was succeeded by his son, who reigned as Pakubuwana IV. The successor was regarded as a more capable and assertive ruler, particularly in his political decision-making.

== Personal life ==
In 1673 AJ, by the time he was a crown prince, his father arranged him to marry Raden Ajeng Wuku, daughter of Adipati Cakraningrat, Regent of Madura. She was his first queen consort, styled as Gusti Kanjeng Ratu Kencana, and her mother was his paternal aunt, Gusti Kanjeng Ratu Madurêtna. Later, she was dismissed and sent back to Madura.

He was skilled in music, including being able to play bonang agêng. When there was a bedhaya performance, he often attended to play himself. He was captivated by a dancer, Bok Lara Bêruk or Mas Rara Bêruk, whom he elevated to the new queen consort, also named Gusti Kanjeng Ratu Kencana. The reason was that since her youth, her body was said to appear radiant every Friday and Tuesday Kasih nights, the glow was like a burnished gold (kencana). She was a commoner-born daughter of Kyai Ngabehi Jagaswara, later elevated to Tumenggung Wirareja.

== Family ==
- Queen consort, Gusti Kanjeng Ratu Kencana, maiden name Raden Ajeng Wuku
  - Raden Mas Gusti Suleman
- Queen consort, Gusti Kanjeng Ratu Kencana, later queen dowager styled as Gusti Kanjeng Ratu Hageng
  - Gusti Kanjeng Ratu Madurêtna
  - Raden Mas Gusti Subadya, titled Kanjeng Gusti Pangeran Adipati Anom, later Pakubuwana IV
  - Raden Ajeng Gusti Supiyah
    - Married Raden Mas Slamet, titled Kanjeng Pangeran Harya Purbanegara, son of Mangkunegara I
  - Raden Mas Gusti Tala, titled Kanjeng Gusti Pangeran Harya Mangkubumi
  - Raden Mas Gusti Sayidi, titled Kanjeng Gusti Pangeran Harya Buminata
  - Raden Ajeng Gusti Salimah, titled Gusti Kanjeng Ratu Timur
- Concubine, Mas Ajeng Rêtna Asmara or Mas Ajeng Dhurak
  - Bendara Raden Ajeng Botor, titled Gusti Kanjeng Ratu Alit
    - Married Kanjeng Pangeran Harya Prabu Hamijaya, son of Mangkunegara I
- Concubine, Mas Ayu Rêtna Di
  - Bendara Raden Ajeng Sêntul
    - Married Raden Sumawijaya, elevated to Raden Mas Tumenggung Harya Kusumadiningrat
- Concubine, Mas Ayu Rêtnasari
  - Bendara Raden Mas Dhubêl, titled Bendara Kanjeng Pangeran Hangabehi
  - Bendara Raden Ajeng Jumilah
    - Married Martapura
    - Married Kyai Kasan Besari
    - Married Kanjeng Pangeran Harya Padmanagara
- Concubine, Mas Ayu Rêsminingsih
  - Bendara Raden Ajeng Jêmprit
    - Married Raden Sumadiwirya, elevated to Raden Mas Tumenggung Harya Wiryadiningrat, Bupati of Ponorogo
- Concubine, Mas Ayu Rêtnadiwati
  - Bendara Raden Ajeng Kabibah
    - Married Kanjeng Raden Adipati Jayaningrat
- Concubine, Mbok Ajeng Wiled
  - Bendara Raden Mas Sukarya, titled Bendara Kanjeng Pangeran Harya Pamot, elevated to Bendara Kanjeng Pangeran Panembahan Jurumartani

== Ancestry ==
Ancestors of Pakubuwono III

Pakubuwana I
Amangkurat IV
Gusti Kanjeng Ratu Pakubuwana
Pakubuwana II
Raden Adipati Tirtakusuma
Gusti Kanjeng Ratu Kencana
Pakubuwana III
Pakubuwana I
Kanjeng Gusti Pangeran Adipati Purbaya
Gusti Kanjeng Ratu Pakubuwana
Gusti Kanjeng Ratu Hemas
Raden Martakusuma
Raden Ayu Pandhansari

== Notes ==
Preceded by Pakubuwono II	Susuhunan of Surakarta; 1749–1788	Succeeded by Pakubuwono IV
