= Imogiri =

District in Bantul, Yogyakarta, Indonesia

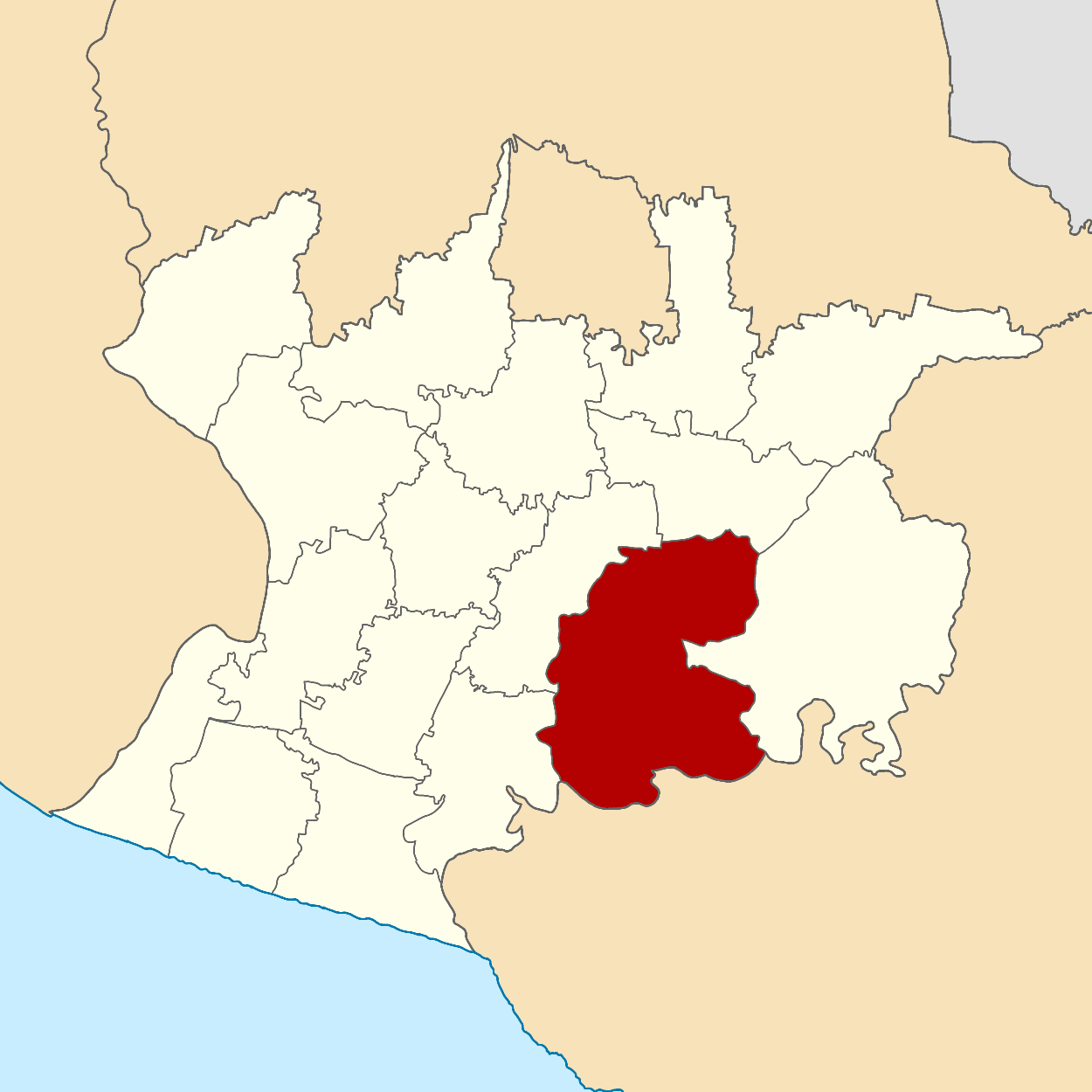
Map of Imogiri in Bantul Regency

Imogiri (Javanese: ꦲꦶꦩꦒꦶꦫꦶ, romanized: Imagiri) is a kapanewon (district) in Bantul Regency, Special Region of Yogyakarta Province, Indonesia.

== See also ==
- Astana Pajimatan Himagiri
