= Pakubuwono XII =

Susuhunan of Surakarta

Pakubuwono XII; ꦦꦑꦸꦨꦸꦮꦟ꧇꧑꧒꧇
- Sri Susuhunan Pakubuwana XII
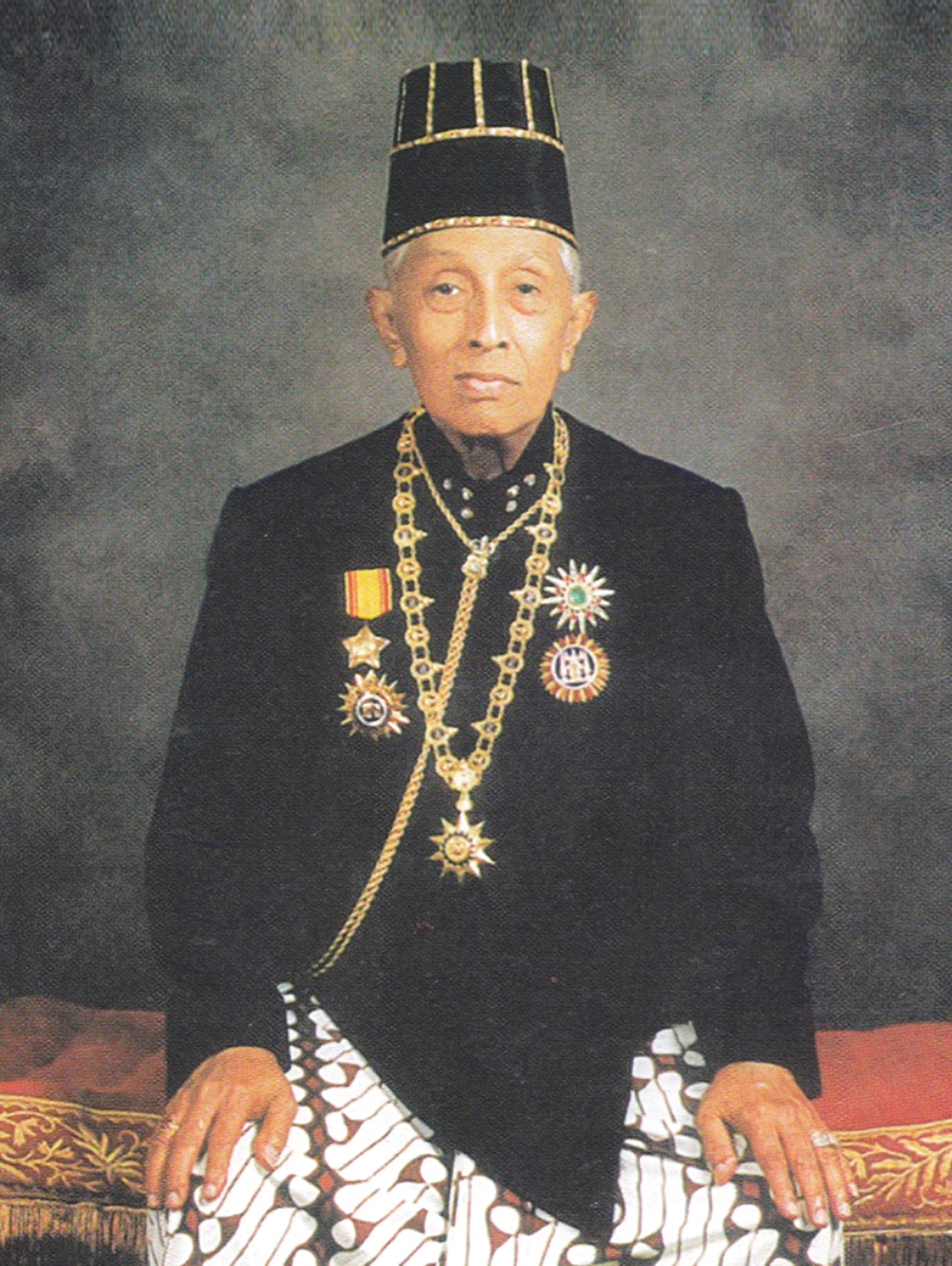
- Official portrait

11th Susuhunan of Surakarta
- Reign: 11 June 1945 − 11 June 2004
- Predecessor: Susuhunan Pakubuwana XI
- Successor: Susuhunan Pakubuwana XIII
- Military Governor: Yuichiro Nagano
- President: Sukarno; Suharto; B. J. Habibie; Abdurrahman Wahid; Megawati Sukarnoputri

Governor of Surakarta
- In office: 6 September 1945 – 1 June 1946
- Predecessor: Office established
- Successor: Office abolished
- President: Sukarno
- Born: Gusti Raden Mas Suryo Guritno; 14 April 1925; Surakarta, Dutch East Indies
- Died: 11 June 2004 (aged 79); Surakarta, Indonesia
- Burial: Astana Pajimatan Himagiri
- Spouses: Kanjeng Raden Ayu Pradapaningrum () Kanjeng Raden Ayu Ratnadiningrum () Kanjeng Raden Ayu Mandayaningrum () Kanjeng Raden Ayu Riya Ragasmara () Kanjeng Raden Ayu Kusumaningrum () Kanjeng Raden Ayu Pujaningrum ()
- Issue more...: SISKS. Pakubuwana XIII; KGPH. Tejawulan; KGPH. Dipokusumo
Names
- Kanjeng Gusti Pangeran Harya Poerbojo
Regnal name
- Sahandhap Dalem Sampeyan Dalem Ingkang Sinuhun Kangjeng Susuhunan Pakubuwana Senapati ing Alaga Abdurrahman Sayyidin Panatagama Ingkang Jumeneng kaping Kalih Welas ing Nagari Surakarta Hadiningrat
- House: Mataram
- Father: Susuhunan Pakubuwana XI
- Mother: GKR. Pakubuwana

Pakubuwono XII (also transliterated Pakubuwana XII; Surakarta, 14 April 1925 – Surakarta, 11 June 2004) was the eleventh Susuhunan (ruler of Surakarta) and the longest-ruling of all monarchs in Surakarta history.

He reigned under Japanese occupation during the Second World War, and through the Sukarno and Suharto eras; in effect, three eras in which traditional Javanese power had been both respected and challenged.

Towards the end of his reign, he was able to stake the claim of his palaces' context in the modern Indonesia by the publication of Karaton Surakarta: A Look into the Court of Surakarta Hadiningrat, Central Java which was published in the same year of his death.

== Early life ==
Born as Raden Mas Soerjo Goeritno (Javanese script: ꦫꦢꦺꦤ꧀ꦩꦱ꧀ꦯꦸꦂꦪꦓꦫꦶꦠ꧀ꦤ), he was the son of Pakubuwono XI and his queen consort, Kanjeng Raden Ayu Koesparijah (styled Gusti Kanjeng Ratu Pakubuwono). RM. Soerjo Goeritno also had a half-sister namely Gusti Raden Ayu Koes Saparijam (styled GKR. Kedaton).

In his childhood, RM. Soerjo Goeritno was educated in an Europeesche Lagere School (Dutch primary school) near Pasar Legi, Surakarta. He was nicknamed Bobby by his friends. Some of his uncles, who were the same age as him, were also educated in this school. RM. Soerjo Goeritno was a friendly pupil and had a close friendship with his classmates without considering his social status. Since his childhood, he was fond of studying Javanese classical dances, especially Handaga and Garuda dances. He often recited Quran with Mr. Tjondrowijoto, a teacher in Mambaul Ulum. He also liked archery. In 1938, RM. Soerjo Goeritno was forced to quit his education for 5 months, as he must follow his father who was mandated by Pakubuwono X, his grandfather, to leave for the Netherlands with other local monarchs in Dutch East Indies to attend 40th jubilee of Queen Wilhelmina's coronation.

After that, RM. Soerjo Goeritno continued his education in Hogereburgerschool te Bandoeng (now SMA Negeri 3 Bandung and SMA Negeri 5 Bandung) with some uncles. After being schooled for 2 years, Pacific War broke out, in which Armed Forces of the Empire of Japan won against Allies of World War II, then Dutch East Indies fell to Empire of Japan.

Pakubuwono XI asked him to leave Bandung for Surakarta. On 1 June 1945, his father died. According to Javanese tradition, the heir must be the Pakubuwono XI's eldest son, Kanjeng Gusti Pangeran Haryo Mangkoeboemi. However, the opportunity was closed as his mother, GKR. Kentjana (the first wife of Pakubuwono XI), had died in 1910, so she could not be appointed as queen consort when her husband was crowned. RM. Soerjo Goeritno subsequently became the heir despite being the youngest son, proven with the fact that he did not attend his father's funeral in Imogiri, in accordance with the tradition that an heir was prohibited to attend his predecessor's funeral.

Before ascending to the throne, RM. Soerjo Goeritno was appointed as heir apparent, styled KGPH. Poerbojo. Another version relates that his appointment was closely related to the role played by Sukarno, future President of Indonesia. RM. Soerjo Goeritno was chosen as Pakubuwono XII because of his young age and ability to adapt to a new situation. Although a new king had been agreed on, a new problem emerged. His coronation plan was once opposed by the Japanese colonial government, who stated that they didn't dare to guarantee the safety of future king.

== Rule ==
=== War of Independence ===
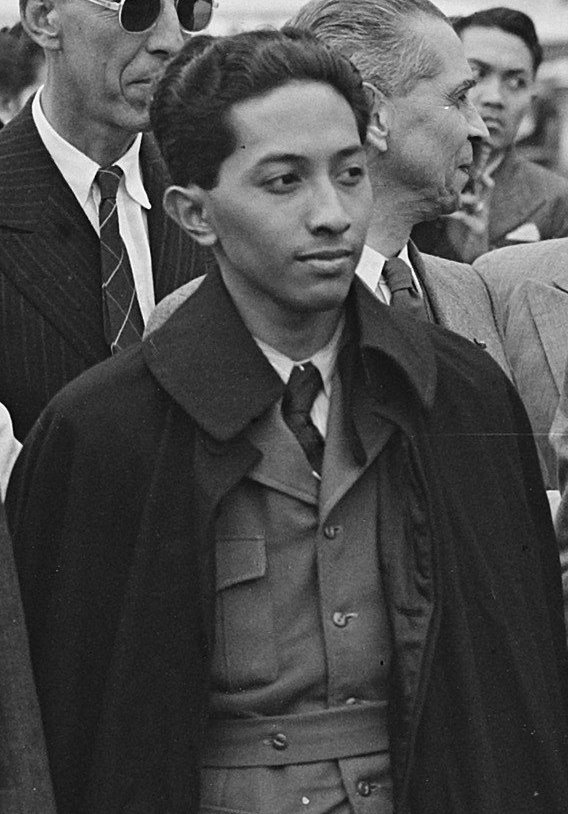
Pakubuwana XII in the Netherlands

RM. Soerjo Goeritno was crowned as Pakubuwono XII on 11 June 1945, approximately 2-months before Independence of Indonesia. Due to his young age, he was often accompanied by his mother, GKR. Pakubuwono (popularly known as Ibu Ageng or Great Mother), in carrying out his daily duties. Pakubuwono XII was often nicknamed as Sinuhun Hamardika, because he became the first Susuhunan of Surakarta who reigned in independence era.

After Proclamation of Independence, on 1 September 1945, he and Mangkunegara VIII separately issue royal decrees which congratulated to the newly founded Republic of Indonesia, 4 days before Hamengkubuwono IX and Paku Alam VIII's decree. On 6 September 1945, Surakarta Sunanate and Duchy of Mangkunegaran were granted Special Region's Charter from President Sukarno.

During Indonesian War of Independence, Pakubuwono XII was awarded titular military rank of lieutenant-general from President Sukarno, which meant he often accompanied the president to observe battlefields. Between 12–13 October 1945, Pakubuwono XII even led an assault on the headquarters of Kenpeitai in Kemlayan (now in Serengan subdistrict) and Timuran (now in Banjarsari subdistrict). He also led an assault on the headquarters of Kido Butai in Mangkubumen (now in Banjarsari subdistrict).

The Netherlands who didn't consent to Indonesian independence attempted to violently seize their former colony. In January 1946, the capital of Indonesia was moved to Yogyakarta because Jakarta had been occupied by the Dutch. At that time, Indonesian government was led by Sutan Syahrir as prime minister, with Sukarno as head of state. As commonly occurred in a country, an opposition faction who did not support the governmental system of PM Syahrir emerged, for example the group of General Soedirman.

As Yogyakarta became a capital, Surakarta which had been an old rival became a center of opposition. The radicals namely Barisan Banteng (meaning "Ox Front" in Indonesian) led by Muwardi deliberately abducted Pakubuwono XII and Sutan Syahrir as a protest against the government of Indonesia.

Barisan Banteng successfully took control of Surakarta without being eradicated by the Indonesian government due to Gen. Soedirman's protection. Gen. Sudirman even successfully persuaded the government to abolish the special status of Surakarta. From 1 June 1946, Sunanate of Surakarta was only a residency within Central Java province. The government was held by civilians, while Pakubuwono XII was merely symbolic.

=== Independence era ===
In his early rule, Pakubuwono XII was viewed as a ruler who failed in taking an important role and using the political situation of Indonesia, which caused his prestige to be lower than that of Hamengkubuwono IX of Yogyakarta.

Pakubuwono XII had actually attempted to regain the special status of Surakarta. On 15 January 1952, Pakubuwono XII explained extensively about Special Region of Surakarta to the ministerial council in Jakarta. On that occasion, he explained that the government of the special region couldn't overcome unrest and gnawing with armed threat, while the government of a special region didn't have power apparatus. However, the attempt was unsuccessful. Eventually, Pakubuwono XII left the palace to attend education in Jakarta in 1954. He appointed his uncle, KGPH. Koesoemojoedo, as his temporary representative.

In his reign, there were two catastrophes in Surakarta Palace. On 19 November 1954, the tallest building in the palace complex, Panggung Sangga Buwana, was burned and most of the building, including the roof and decoration in the top of building, was destroyed. On 31 January 1985, the core of palace was burned down at 9.00 pm. The fire happened in Sasana Parasdya, Sasana Sewaka, Sasana Handrawina, Dalem Ageng Prabasuyasa, Dayinta, and Paningrat. The entire building, including the furnitures, was completely destroyed.

On 5 February 1985, Pakubuwono XII told President Soeharto about the fire in Surakarta Palace. The president reacted by forming Committee 13 who was tasked to rehabilitate the palace. Hardjonagoro, a national cultural observer who was also Pakubuwono XII's friend, was one of the member of Committee 13. Surakarta Palace was fully rehabilitated after obtaining 4 million rupiahs from the government. The renovation of palace complex was finished and it was inaugurated in 1987.

On 26 September 1995, by Presidential Decree no. 70/SKEP/IX/1995, Pakubuwono XII was awarded Struggle Prize and Medal of Generation '45 from central government. The award was given as a form of honor for Pakubuwono XII as the first king in Indonesia to swear allegiance and stand behind the republic government in the early independence era. Pakubuwono XII also voluntarily contributed a half of his personal and royal wealth to central government in that era.

Although in his early reign, Pakubuwono XII was politically less successful, he still became the patron figure of Javanese culture. In reformation era, many national figures, such as President Abdurrahman Wahid, still respected him as elder of Java.

== Death and succession ==
In the middle of 2004, Pakubuwana fell into coma and underwent intensive care in Panti Kosala Dr. Oen Hospital, Surakarta. Eventually, Pakubuwono XII was pronounced dead on 11 June 2004. At the same time of the death of Pakubuwono XII, 2004 Indonesian presidential election took place in Surakarta.

Upon his death in 2004, there was no clear heir as there was no official queen installed. Two of his sons who were half-brothers claimed the throne.

The older, Hangabehi, took control of the kraton (palace) and expelled his younger half-brother Tedjowulan. Each had himself crowned and they held separate tomb-sealing rituals for their father.

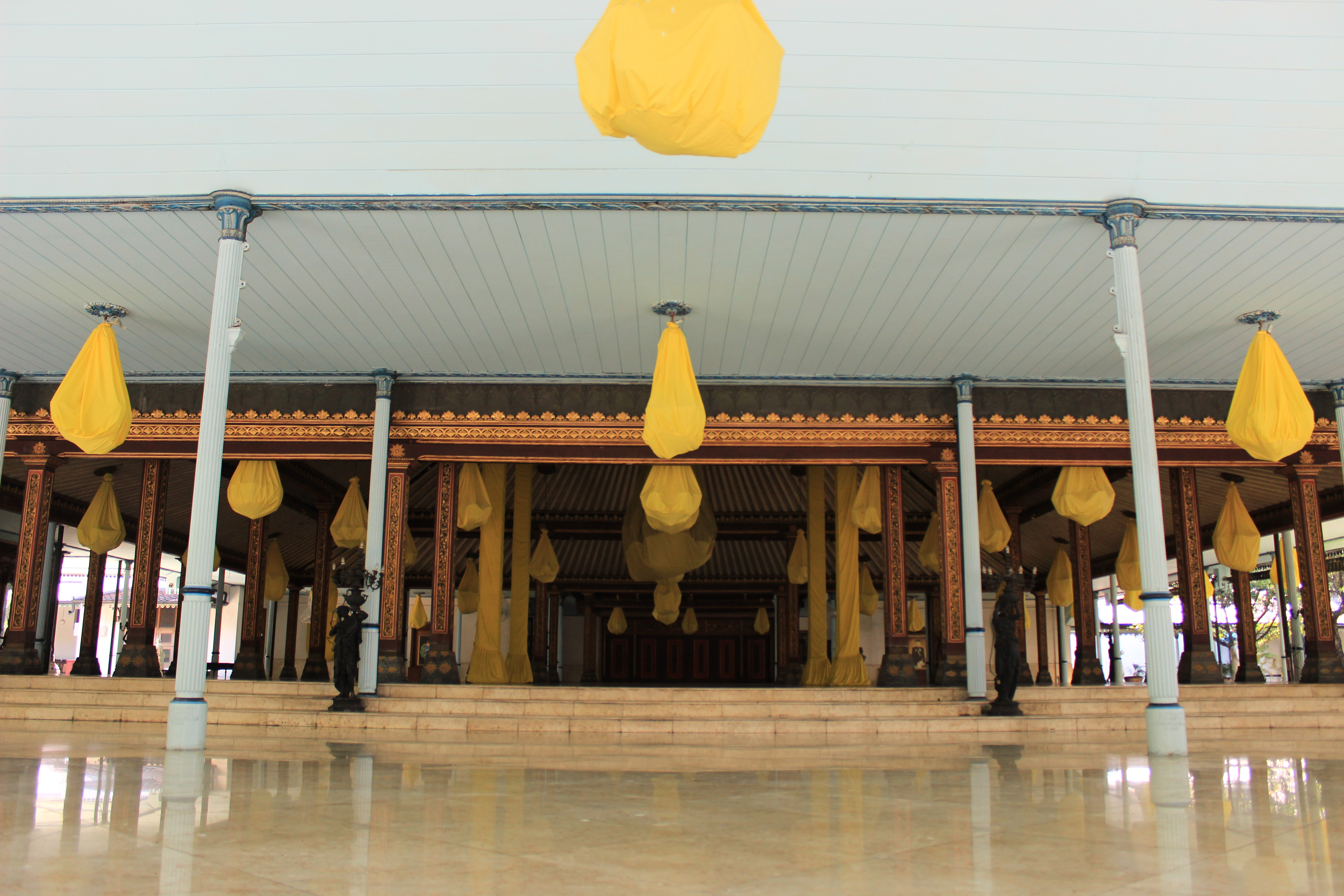
Sasana Sewaka Keraton, Royal residence of Pakubuwono, Surakarta

Family consensus has now acknowledged that Hangabehi is the rightful heir and is now titled SISKS Pakubuwono XIII. On 18–19 July 2009, there was a ceremony in the kraton where the enthronement anniversary was conducted with the sacred Bedoyo Dance performed for the ceremony. The attendees consisted of various local and foreign dignitaries as well as Hangebehi's half-brother Tedjowulan.

In 2017, further developments of crowning Pakubuwono XIII resolved the 13-year long dispute.

Line of Succession
Preceded by:		Succeeded by:
Pakubuwono XI	Pakubuwono XII	Pakubuwono XIII

== Family ==
=== Wives ===
1. Kanjeng Raden Ayu Pradapaningrum
2. Kanjeng Raden Ayu Ratnadiningrum
3. Kanjeng Raden Ayu Mandayaningrum
4. Kanjeng Raden Ayu Riya Ragasmara
5. Kanjeng Raden Ayu Kusumaningrum
6. Kanjeng Raden Ayu Pujaningrum

=== Children ===
1. Gusti Raden Ajeng Kus Handawiyah
  daughter of KRAy. Mandayaningrum, styled as Gusti Kanjeng Ratu Alit.
2. Gusti Raden Mas Surya Partana
  son of KRAy. Pradapaningrum, styled as Kanjeng Gusti Pangeran Harya Hangabehi, then Pakubuwana XIII.
3. Gusti Raden Mas Surya Suprapta
  son of KRAy. Riya Ragasmara, styled as Kanjeng Gusti Pangeran Harya Hadi Prabawa.
4. Gusti Raden Ajeng Kus Supiyah
  daughter of KRAy. Pradapaningrum, styled as Gusti Kanjeng Ratu Galuh Kencana.
5. Gusti Raden Mas Suryana
  son of KRAy. Kusumaningrum, styled as Kanjeng Gusti Pangeran Harya Puspa Hadikusuma.
6. GAy. Kus Rahmanijah
7. GRAy. Kus Saparnijah
8. Gusti Raden Ajeng Kus Handariyah
  daughter of KRAy. Pradapaningrum, styled as Gusti Kanjeng Ratu Sekar Kencana.
9. GRAy. Kus Kristijah
10. GRAy. Kus Sapardijah
11. GRAy. Kus Raspijah
12. GRM. Surjo Suseno/KGPH. Kusumojudho
13. GRAy. Kus Sutrijah
14. Gusti Raden Ajeng Kus Isbandiyah
  daughter of KRAy. Pradapaningrum, styled as Gusti Kanjeng Ratu Ratna Dumilah.
15. Gusti Raden Mas Surya Suteja
  son of KRAy. Ratnadiningrum
  styled as Kanjeng Gusti Pangeran Harya Panembahan Agung Tejawulan.
16. GRM. Surjo Bandono/KGPH. Puger
17. GRAy. Kus Partinah
18. GRM. Surjo Suparto/KGPH Adp.Dipokusumo
19. GRM. Surjo Saroso
20. GRM. Surjo Bandrijo/KGPH. Benowo
21. GRAy. Kus Niyah
22. GRM. Surjo Sudhiro/Gusti Pangeran Haryo Notokusumo
23. GRM. Surjo Suharso/GPH. Madukusuma
24. GRM. Surjo Sudarsono/GPH. Widjojo Sudarsono
25. Gusti Raden Ajeng Kus Murtiyah
  daughter of KRAy. Pradapaningrum, styled as Gusti Kanjeng Ratu Wandansari.
26. GRAy. Kus Sabandijah
27. GRAy. Kus Trinijah
28. Gusti Raden Ajeng Kus Indriyah
  daughter of KRAy. Pradapaningrum, styled as Gusti Kanjeng Ratu Hayu.
29. GRM. Surjo Sutrisno/GPH. Surjo Witjaksono
30. GRM. Nur Muhammad/GPH. Tjahjoningrat
31. GRAy. Kus Suwijah
32. GRAy. Kus Ismanijah
33. GRAy. Kus Samsijah
34. GRAy. Kus Saparsijah
35. GRM. Surjo Wahono/GPH. Surjo Mataram

== Military honours ==
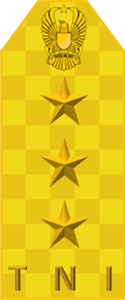
- Titular rank of Lieutenant-General (November 1, 1945)
- Satyalencana Perang Kemerdekaan I (August 17, 1958)
- Satyalencana Perang Kemerdekaan II (August 17, 1958)
- Medal for Building Service of Indonesian War Force, issued by President Sukarno on October 5, 1958
- Heroic Decoration in Guerilla Struggle in Defending Independence, issued by President Sukarno on November 10, 1958
- Awarded Indonesian Veteran Card on June 8, 1968.

== Ancestry ==
Ancestors of Pakubuwono XII

Pakubuwana IX
Pakubuwana X
Gusti Kanjeng Ratu Pakubuwana
Pakubuwana XI
Raden Mas Panji Sumawinata
Raden Ayu Mandayarêtna
Pakubuwana XII
Raden Mas Tumenggung Wiryadiningrat
Kanjeng Raden Mas Tumenggung Harya Puspadiningrat
Bendara Raden Ayu Wiryadiningrat
Gusti Kanjeng Ratu Pakubuwana
Kanjeng Raden Adipati Sasradiningrat IV
Raden Ayu Puspadiningrat
Bendara Raden Ayu Adipati Sasradiningrat

== Literature ==
- Ricklefs MC. 2001. A History of Modern Indonesia: 3rd Edition. Palgrave and Stanford University Press.
- Purwadi. 2007. Sejarah Raja-Raja Jawa. Yogyakarta: Media Ilmu.

Preceded by Pakubuwono XI	Susuhunan of Surakarta; 1945–2004	Succeeded by Pakubuwono XIII
