= Special Region of Surakarta =

Former province of Indonesia

Special Province of Daerah Istimewa Surakarta Provinsi Daerah Istimewa Surakarta
- Special province of Indonesia
- 1945–1946
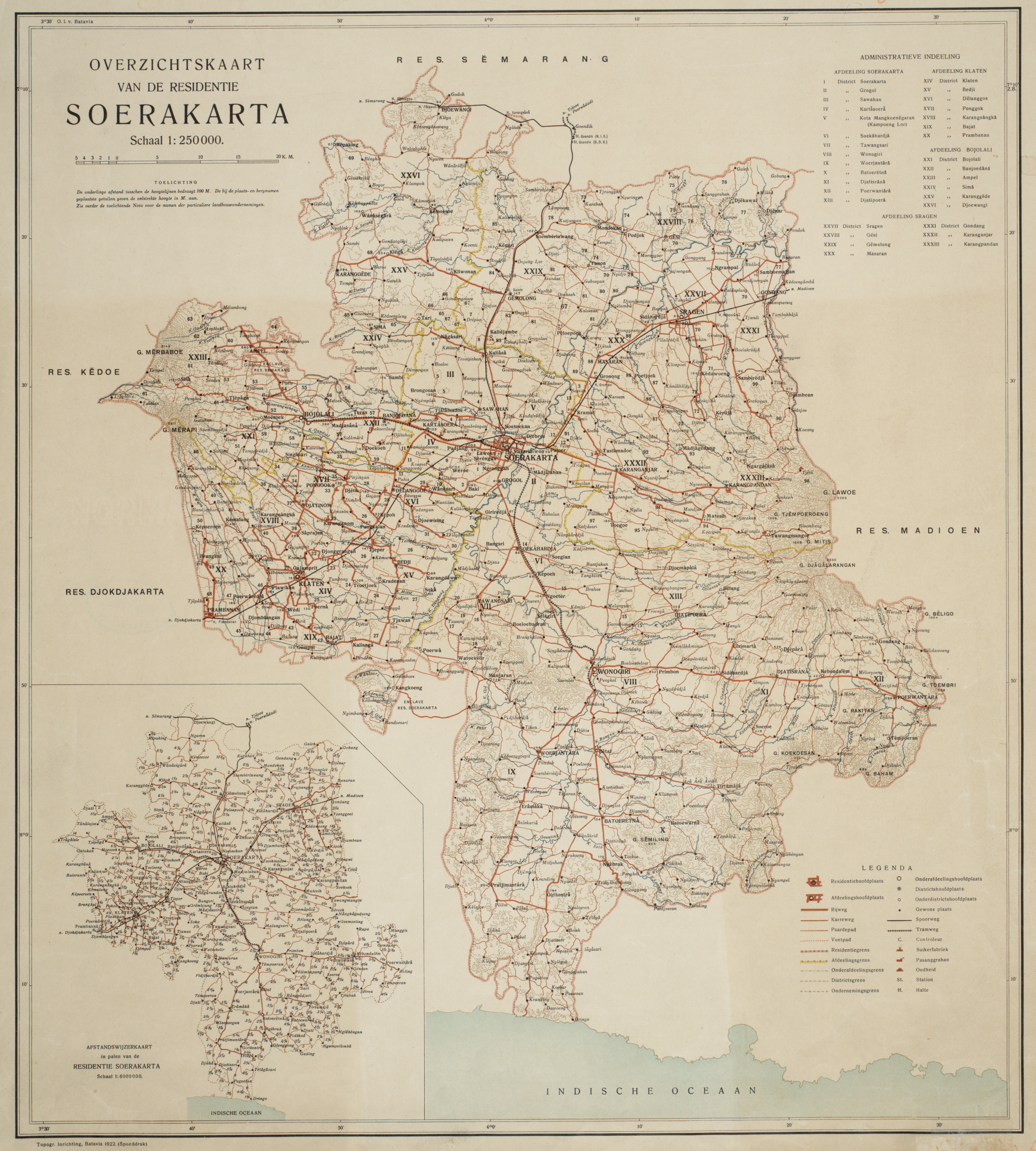
- Location of the Special Province of Daerah Istimewa Surakarta
- Capital: Surakarta
- Government
  - Type: Devolved non-sovereign diarchical special region within a unitary republic
- Governor
  - 1945–1946: Pakubuwono XII
- Vice Governor
  - 1945–1946: Mangkunegara VIII
- Historical era: Cold War
  - Established: 15 August 1945
  - Dissolved and merged to Central Java: 16 June 1946
Preceded by	Succeeded by
Surakarta Sunanate; Mangkunegaran	Central Java

The Special Region of Surakarta was a de-facto provincial-level autonomous region of Indonesia that existed between August 1945 and July 1946. The establishment of this special autonomy status during this period was never established by a separate law based on Article 18 of the original Constitution, but only by a Presidential Determination Charter on 19 August 1945 and Law No. 1 Year 1945 on the Position of the Regional National Committee.

== Origin of the Special Region ==
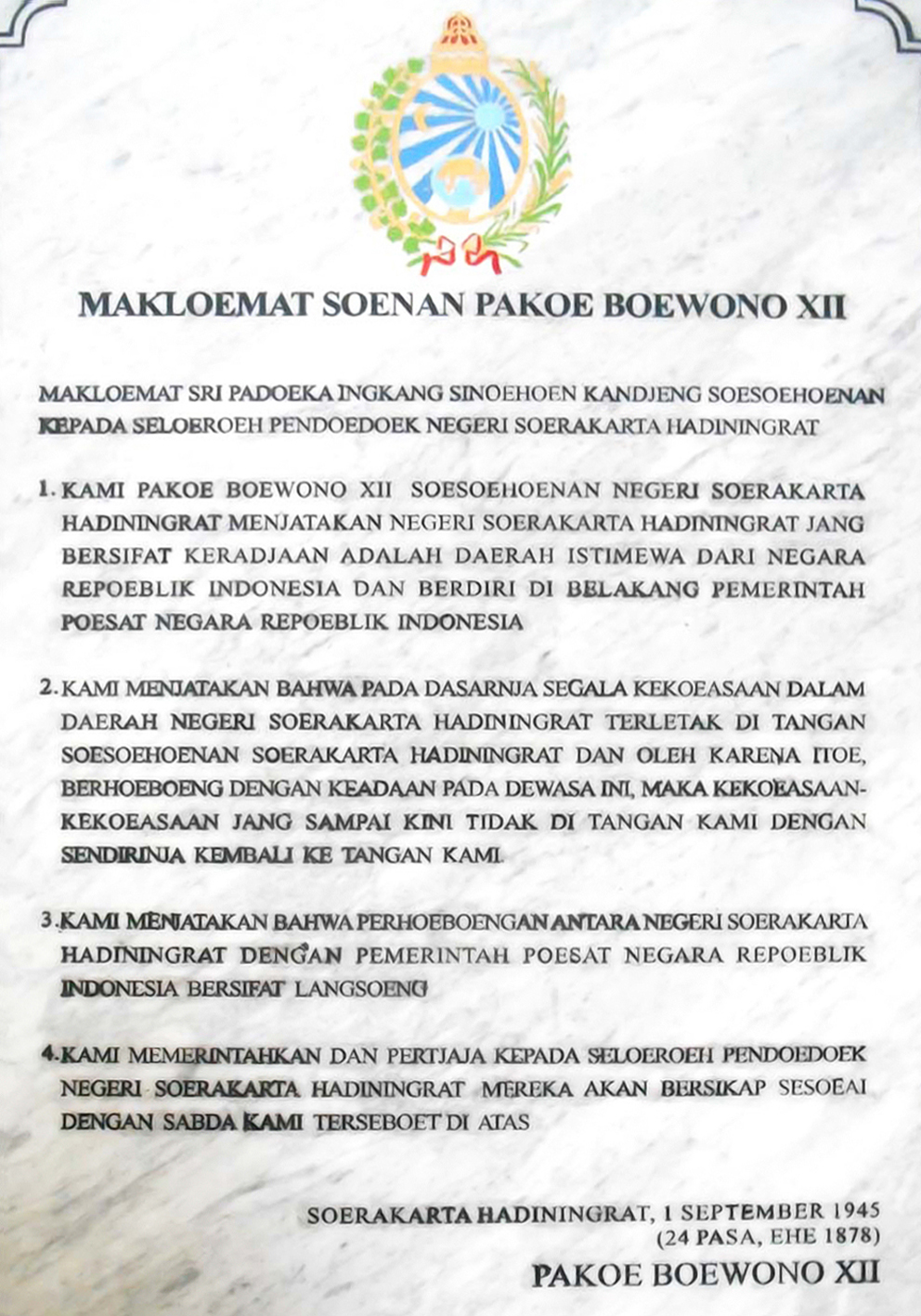
Marble plaque of the Charter of the State Privileges of Surakarta by His Majesty Pakubuwono XII, on display at the Surakarta Palace Museum.

The establishment of the Special Region was done by President Sukarno as a reward for the recognition of the kings of the Surakarta Sunanate and the Duchy of Mangkunegaran who declared their territory as part of the Republic of Indonesia on 19 August 1945.

Then on 1 September 1945, the Surakarta Royal Court and the Mangkunegaran Duchy sent an edict to President Sukarno regarding a statement from Susuhunan Pakubuwono XII and Adipati Mangkunegara VIII stating that the royal State of Surakarta Hadiningrat was a Special Region of the Republic of Indonesia, where the relationship between the State of Surakarta and the Central Government of the Republic of Indonesia was direct. On this basis, President Sukarno gave official recognition to Susuhunan Pakubuwono XII and Adipati Mangkunegara VIII by granting a charter of official position, each as the head of a special region.

Four days later, on 5 September 1945, the Sultanate of Yogyakarta and the Duchy of Pakualaman issued a similar edict, which became the basis for the formation of the Special Region of Yogyakarta. Making the Special Province of Surakarta's autonomy older than Yogyakarta's, have it not been abolished.

== Administrative divisions ==
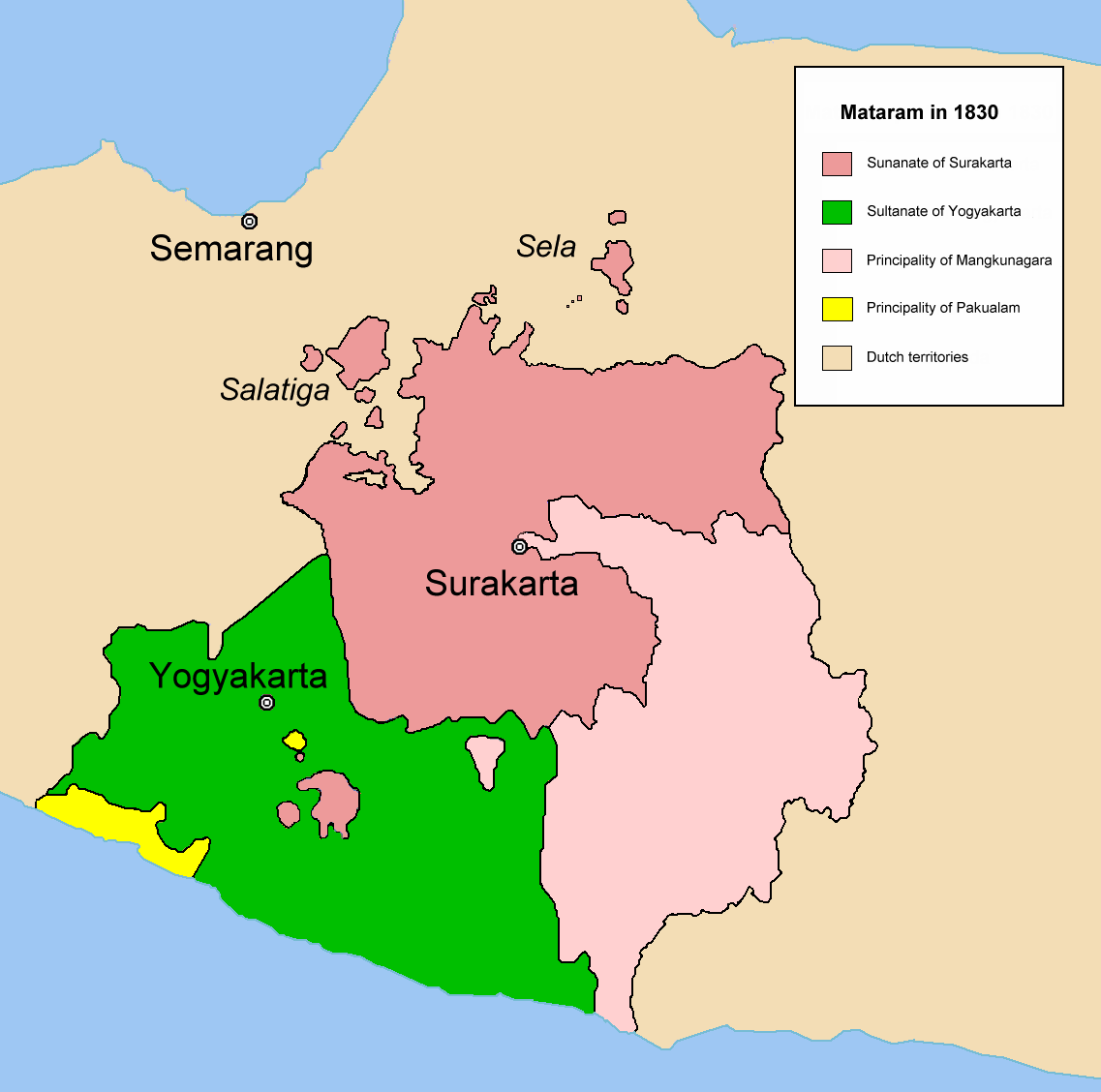
Surakarta Sunanate (red) and Mangkunegaran (bright pink) make up the majority of the Special Province of Surakarta

There has never been a regulation that mentions the position of the Surakarta Special Region on the subdivision of Indonesia. Whether at the provincial level (such as the Special Region of Yogyakarta) or at the Regency level (such as Kutai, Berau, and Bulongan). Thus, it cannot be clearly known what the position of Surakarta was.

The Special Region of Surakarta includes:

1. The Kasunanan territory consisting of: (a) Surakarta Regency (current Surakarta City (minus Banjarsari district, Kerten district, Jajar district and Karangasem district in Laweyan district, Mojosongo district in Jebres district) plus Sukoharjo Regency), (b) Klaten Regency (including Kotagede and Imogiri exclaves), (c) Boyolali Regency, (d) Sragen Regency;
2. Mangkunegaran territory consisting of: (a) Karanganyar Regency (minus Colomadu and Gondangrejo districts), (b) Wonogiri Regency (including Ngawen exclave), and (c) Mangkunegaran City Regency.

== Governance ==
The government in Surakarta was divided into two stages during the period of August 1945 to July 1946. Each stage shows a significant difference.

=== DIS Government August 1945 – October 1945 ===
During this period there was a dual government between:

1. The Kooti Zimukyoku (Japanese: 高地事務局, Hepburn: Kōchi-jimukyoku) (Japanese government)
2. Government of the Surakarta Regional Indonesian National Committee
3. Surakarta Sunanate Government
4. Praja Mangkunegaran Government

Each of these governments had its own powers and apparatus. The Kooti Zimukyoku government was a status quo government that continued the government for the Allied Forces as the victors of the Second World War. This government did not last long because it was soon captured by the Surakarta Regional KNI government. The Surakarta Regional KNI Government was a government formed by the people as a reaction to welcome Indonesian independence. This government formed a three-man Governing Council to exercise day-to-day executive power.

The government of the Surakarta Sunanate was the government that continued the monarchy before the independence of Indonesia. It was led by the Pepatihdalem (Prime Minister) for and on behalf of His Majesty Pakubuwono XII. The government of Praja Mangkunegaran, which was a continuation of the monarchy before Indonesian independence, was led by the Patih for and on behalf of Mangkunegara VIII. With the existence of these various governments, there was an overlap of power and competition for the legitimacy of the people and the central government.

=== DIS Government October 1945 – July 1946 ===
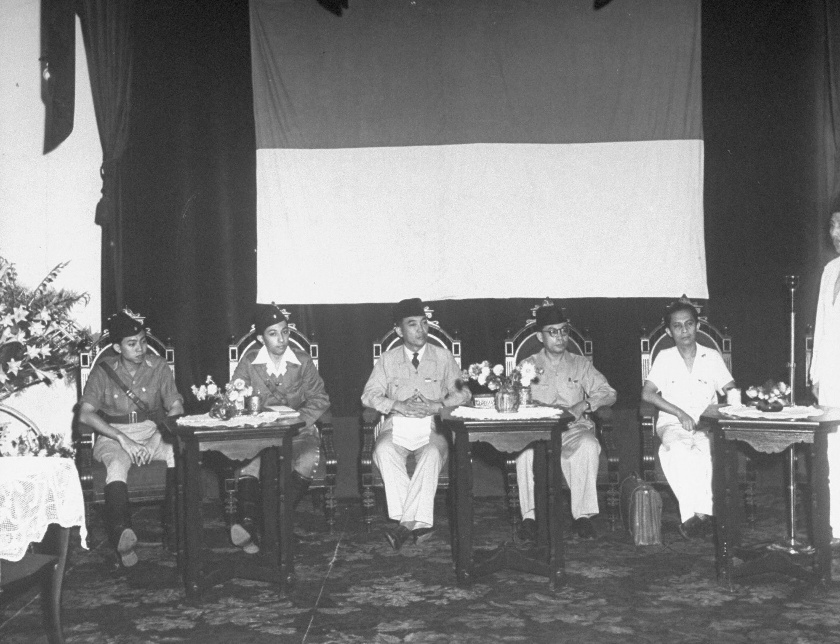
(From Left) Mangkunegara VIII, Pakubuwana XII, Soekarno, Hatta and Sutan Syahrir at the Former Surakarta Governor's Residence (Now Surakarta City Hall)

To overcome the chaos and overlapping governments in DIS, the Central Government sent the Governor of Central Java, Panji Soeroso, as the High Commissioner of Surakarta to mediate and to organise a new government. Since then the DIS government has consisted of:

1. High Commissioner of the Central Government
2. KNI Surakarta Regional Working Committee
3. Surakarta Regional Directorium

The High Commissioner of the Central Government was the representative of the Central government in Surakarta. This commissioner functions as the Head of the Special Region of Surakarta and oversees the work of the local legislature and the local executive. The KNI Surakarta Regional Working Committee was the local legislative body of the Surakarta Region. It was formed by and responsible to the Central Indonesian National Committee (KNIP) of the Surakarta Region. Members of the KNI Surakarta Regional Working Committee were elected by and from the members of the KNI Surakarta Region. The Surakarta Regional Directorium was the local executive body of the Surakarta Region. It consists of representatives from the KNI Surakarta, the Royal Government of Surakarta, and the Praja Mangkunegaran Government. The KNI of Surakarta Region has five representatives. The Royal Government of Surakarta had two representatives. The Mangkunegaran Royal Government had two representatives.

== Politics ==
A Directorate Government consisting of Kasunanan, Mangkunegaran and KND elements did not work, because the Kasunanan and Mangkunegaran wanted to have individual interests, leading to further instability. In its short span, the Special Region of Surakarta has not been free from various political upheavals. With the monarchical upheaval and the anti-swapraja (anti-monarchist) movement.

=== Monarchical upheaval ===
1. The monarchical upheaval that occurred in the Surakarta Kingdom was the existence of the position of Patih. This position ruled for and on behalf of the susuhunan (ruler), causing Susuhan Pakubuwono XII to not freely move to accommodate the upheaval of the people. On 17 October 1945, the pepatihdalem (prime minister) of the Kesunanan and former BPUPK member, KRMH. Sasradiningrat V, was kidnapped by anti-swapraja mobs (he was later freed). This was followed by the removal of regents, many of whom were relatives of the king, and their replacement by pro-swapraja men. In March 1946, the new pepatihdalem, KRMT. Yudhanagara, was also kidnapped. And in April 1946, nine Kepatihan officials experienced the same thing. The reoccurring incidents did not serve as a lesson to Surakarta by continuing to appoint a temporary acting patih to exercise the power of the Susuhunan.
2. The monarchical upheaval that occurred within Praja Mangkunegaran was the reluctance of the duke of Mangkunegaran to become Vice Governor of the Special Region to accompany the Susuhan Pakubuwono XII as Governor of the Special Region. Adipati Mangkunegara VIII, wanted Praja Mangkunegaran to be its own special region and not under Surakarta. This was because the area of the Praja was comparable in size to that of the Kingdom of Surakarta. In addition, the Praja was formed with the Treaty of Salatiga, which was almost the same weight as the Treaty of Giyanti.
3. The upheaval of the monarchies of both the Kingdom of Surakarta and Praja Mangkunegaran was their defection by declaring to break away from Dutch rule and swearing its allegiance under the Indonesian government. Thus the monarchical rulers de-facto lost their territories and citizens.
4. The police desertion of both the Kingdom of Surakarta and Praja Mangkunegaran was the defection of the monarchical police to join the police and armed forces of the Republic of Indonesia. Thus the monarchical rulers de-facto lost their government apparatus.

=== Anti-swapraja (anti-monarchist) agitation ===
1. The leftist anti-monarchist upheaval was a revolutionary socialist-communist agitation to seize lands controlled by the monarchy.
2. The anti-monarchist upheaval of the Opposition group was the upheaval of the opposition group not in the Indonesian cabinet government who also took a distance and a stance opposite to Sukarno-Hatta, making political adventures to counterbalance the centre of power in Yogyakarta by making Surakarta the "wild-west" of Yogyakarta.

== Economy ==
Until now there has been no complete information about the economy of DIS between 1945–1946. However, it can be estimated that as usual, the economy after the war and in a state of revolution was in a deplorable state. This will be more pronounced when compared to the economy before the Second World War, especially during the reign of Pakubuwono X.

== Socio-culture ==
Until now, there is no complete information about the socio-cultural condition of DIS between 1945–1946. The last condition before the Second World War put Surakarta Sunanate and Mangkunegaran Praja in a position to develop the agrarian industry, especially sugar cane and tobacco. This led to the growth of the labour class and eventually the socialist ideology, which in its more extreme form was communism, flourished. After Indonesian independence, supported by the decline of economic life and political turmoil, the working class moved to form a revolution.

== Suspension and abolition ==
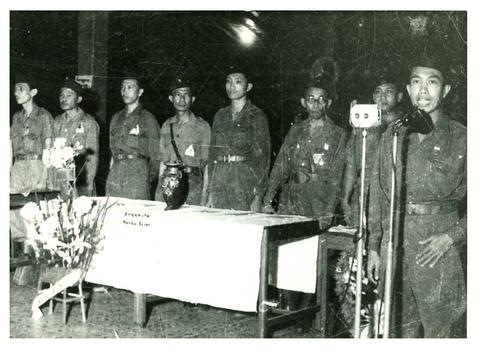
The 1st anniversary ceremony of the Barisan Banteng, attended by President Sukarno, was held in surakarta months after the kidnapping (14 December 1946)

The freezing and abolition of the special region status was inseparable from the emergence of a social revolution in the form of an anti-swapraja movement in Surakarta, which took place simultaneously with the East Sumatran Social Revolution. Like the East Sumatran Social Revolution, the Surakarta anti-swapraja movement wanted to abolish the royal system on the grounds of anti-feudalism. At the time of the establishment of the Special Region of Surakarta, Moewardi had a stronger influence than Pakubuwono XII, who was considered to have no experience in managing matters of public interest, lacked the seriousness and courage to make decisions and did not understand the forces of revolution that were moving towards western democracy and popular sovereignty. This was exacerbated by the disharmonious relationship between the Surakarta Sunanate and Mangkunegaran.

On 17 October 1945, the Susuhunan pepatihdalem (Prime Minister), KRMH Sosrodiningrat was kidnapped and killed by the Swapraja movement. This was followed by the removal of regents in the Surakarta region who were relatives of the Susuhunan and Adipati Mangkunegara. In March 1946, the new pepatihdalem, KRMT Yudonagoro, was also kidnapped and killed by the Swapraja movement. In April 1946, nine Kepatihan officials also suffered the same fate.

The anti-swapraja movement escalated into mass action. The Barisan Banteng (BB) unit, led by Muwardi, managed to take control of Surakarta while the Indonesian government did not suppress it because of General Sudirman's defence. In fact, General Sudirman also managed to urge the government to revoke Surakarta's special region status. On the city's seizure in January 1946, the Barisan Banteng kidnapped Pakubuwono XII, Kanjeng Ratu, and Soerjohamidjojo, demanding that Sunan be aligned with other popular leaders as "Bung" (meaning Comrade or Brother). Another motive was the seizure of agricultural lands controlled by the two monarchies to be divided to the peasants (landreform) by the socialist movement of the anti-swapraja. In addition, they also demanded that he relinquish his political power and join the Republican Government. As a result of this incident, in May 1946, the Sjahrir Government arrested 12 PNI and BB leaders, including Moewardi. Of course, BBRI did not accept the arrest. They then held a massive demonstration in Surakarta to demand the release of their leaders. The action was responded positively by the leader of the TRI (Tentara Republik Indonesia) General Soedirman by releasing the 12 people.

The increasingly precarious conditions in Surakarta culminated on the 3 July Affair, when the first Prime Minister of Indonesia, Sutan Sjahrir, was kidnapped by the republican opposition, Persatoean Perdjoangan (Union of Struggle), led by Major-General Sudarsono and 14 civilian leaders, among them was Tan Malaka, of the Communist Party of Indonesia. Sjahrir was held in a rest house in Paras. President Sukarno was outraged by this uprising and ordered Surakarta Police to arrest the rebel leaders. On 1 July 1946, the 14 leaders were arrested and thrown into Wirogunan prison. However, on 2 July 1946, 3rd Division soldiers led by Major General Soedarsono stormed Wirogunan prison and released the 14 rebel leaders.

President Sukarno then ordered Lieutenant Colonel Suharto, the army leader in Surakarta, to arrest Soedarsono and the rebel leaders. However, Soeharto refused this order because he did not want to arrest his own leaders. He would only arrest the rebels if there was a direct order from the Indonesian military Chief of Staff, General Sudirman. Sukarno was furious at this refusal and dubbed Suharto a stubborn officer (Dutch: Koppig).

Following the kidnapping, a handful of opposition forces attempted to attack the presidential palace in Yogyakarta, but were foiled. Soedarsono and the rebel leaders were disarmed and arrested near the Presidential Palace in Yogyakarta by the presidential guard, after Suharto managed to persuade them to appear before President Sukarno. PM Syahrir was then released and Soedarsono and the rebel leaders were sentenced to prison, although a few months later the rebels were pardoned by Sukarno and released from prison.

With the fear of spreading after the constant political upheavals and kidnappings, the Central Government of the Republic of Indonesia represented by Sultan Sjahrir, Amir Sjarifuddin, and Sudarsono, with the Government of Special District Surakarta, represented by Pakubuwono XII, Mangkunegara VIII, KRMTH. Wuryaningrat, and KRMTH. Partohandoyo, opened up rounds of negotiations discussing the future of Surakarta. The meeting was held in the De Javasche Bank (DJB) Agentschap Soerakarta (now Bank Indonesia, Solo) building. The government then issued Law No. 16/SD/1946 which decided that Surakarta became a temporary karesidenan (residency) under a resident and was part of the territory of the Republic of Indonesia. And that both Pakubuwono XII and Mangkunegara VIII were no longer allowed to participate in politics or government and were merely a symbol.

On August 8, 1946, the Republic of Indonesia's central government issued a Government Regulation in Lieu of Law stating that the establishment of a Regional People's Representative Council in Surakarta was in charge of managing local region's matters, as a replacement of the KNI of Special Region of Surakarta, while its power remained in the hands of Resident appointed by the central government. In less than a year, in June 1947, the Government of the Republic of Indonesia issued Law No. 16/47, which established the establishment of cities led by mayors, including Surakarta. The power of Surakarta Hadiningrat Sunanate and Kadipaten Mangkunegaran became increasingly limited and wained as a result of the 1948 law governing the appointment of the Head of the former Special Region, who was always chosen from the descendants of the Royal family. Eventually, the Minister of Home Affairs, through a decree dated 3 March 1950, declared that the territories of the Sunanate and Mangkunegaran were administratively part of the province of Central Java. Both decrees ended Surakarta's special status and merged the province to Central Java.

=== Other reasons ===
There is an opinion that at the beginning of his reign, Pakubuwono XII failed to take an important role and take advantage of the political situation of the Republic of Indonesia. Pakubuwono XII at that time was considered powerless in the face of anti-swapraja groups who aggressively maneuvered in politics and spread rumours that the Surakarta nobles were allies of the Dutch government, so that some people felt distrustful and rebelled against the rule of the Sunanate, a belief that many people still hold to this day. In the book series Sekitar Perang Kemerdekaan Indonesia, General Abdul Haris Nasution wrote that the kings of Surakarta defected and betrayed Indonesia during the Second Dutch Military Aggression in 1948–1949. The TNI had even prepared Colonel Djatikoesoemo (the first Chief of Staff of the Indonesian Army), the son of Pakubuwono X, to be appointed as the new Susuhunan and Lt. Col. Suryo Sularso to be the new Mangkunegara. But some people and soldiers increasingly wanted to abolish the monarchy altogether. Finally Major Achmadi Hadisoemarto, the military ruler of Surakarta, was only given the task of directly liaising with the monarchical palaces of Surakarta. Both monarchs were asked to firmly side with the Republic. If they refused, action would be taken in accordance with the Non-Cooperation Instruction.

In fact, during the National Revolution, Pakubuwono XII sided with the Indonesian government. He even obtained the military rank of titular lieutenant general. and in 1945–1948, he actively accompanied President Sukarno and Vice President Mohammad Hatta several times to visit various areas in Central and East Java, both in order to consolidate the government and to visit the front lines of battle.

== Re-establishment proposals ==
=== Attempt by Pakubuwono XII ===
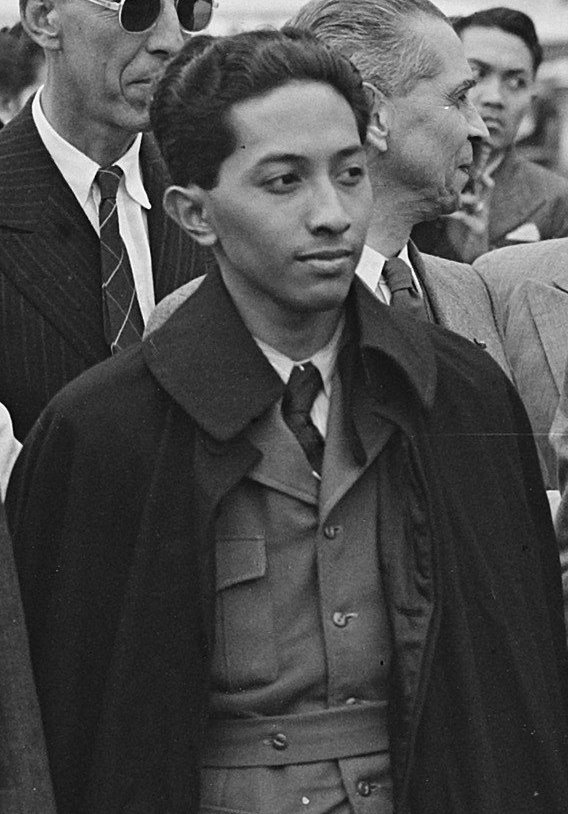
Pakubuwana XII

In 1948, Law No. 22 article 18 paragraph 5 was issued to regulate regional government, stating that the Head of the Special Region was appointed by the President from the descendants of the ruling family from before the Republic of Indonesia, but in the discussion of the Central Indonesian National Committee session, several words in article 18 were changed. The changes became clearer when on 24 November 1951, Pakubuwono XII received a letter sent by the Soekiman Cabinet (Surat No. 66/5/38) stating that the new draft government regulation was not in accordance with Law No. 22 article 15. Law No. 22 article 15 and that he was summoned to clarify the status.

In a last attempt, Pakubuwono XII had tried to restore the status of Surakarta Special Region. On 15 January 1952, Pakubuwono XII gave a lengthy explanation about Surakarta Special Region to the Cabinet of Indonesia in Jakarta, on this occasion he explained that the Swapraja Government was unable to overcome the turmoil and undermining accompanied by armed threats, while the Swapraja Government itself had no means of power. However, these efforts faltered because they never reached a consensus, on the basis of trivial issues can complicate matters.

=== Recent developments in the Reformation era ===
Along with the reopening of the spirit of regional autonomy and with the granting of Special Autonomy to Papua (2001), West Papua (2008), Aceh (2001 and 2006), DKI Jakarta (1999 and 2007) followed by Central Papua, South Papua, Mountainous Papua and Southwest Papua (2022) and the affirmation of the privileges of Aceh (1999 and 2006) and Yogyakarta (2012), there is a discourse to revive the Special Region of Surakarta as part of the Republic of Indonesia. One of the steps that will be taken is to conduct a judicial review to the Constitutional Court of the Law on the State of the Republic of Indonesia Number 10 of 1950.

On 14 December 2010, a group of people held a demonstration and a joint prayer, known as 'Ritual Wilujengan', at the border of Yogyakarta Province, near the south side of Prambanan Temple area. The protesters demanded the government's promise to give them as a special region, in accordance with UUD 45 article 18 and that they would go to the Constitutional Court if not fulfilled. Attended by those who claimed to be delegates from the community in across the greater Solo area, the demonstrators wore traditional Javanese clothes in Solo style with yellow Kasunanan necklaces. They also carried red and white banners with historical facts.

On 26 June 2013, a lawsuit was filed to the Constitutional Court by two purported members of the royal family of Surakarta. Stating that they want to establish a special autonomous region for their territory on behalf of the Kasunanan. The petitioners contended that the Special Region of Surakarta held historical and constitutional significance, possessing its own government and culture. They argued that the region's dissolution and subsequent integration into Central Java Province contravened the provisions outlined in the 1945 Constitution. They challenge a 1950 law that abolished the residency system and merged Surakarta with other regions into Central Java province. The lawsuit garnered media attention, which prompted a reaction from then elected governor of Central Java, Ganjar Pranowo and his provincial government. Central Java provincial council gave out a statement of disagreement with the demand for Surakarta Special Region. While Ganjar stated that he would respect whatever decision the Constitutional Court makes regarding the lawsuit and that the matter of Surakarta Special Region is up to the president and the parliament, while the governor and the provincial council can only give recommendations after a thorough study. Though, he questioned the rationale behind the demand for Surakarta Special Region, and whether it would improve governance and public service, as it could create unrest among the people.

On 27 March 2014, the Constitutional Court ultimately dismissed the petition challenging the validity of Law No. 10 of 1950 concerning the Establishment of Central Java Province. The court based its ruling on the lack of legal standing of the petitioners in requesting the legal status of Surakarta Special Region. Moreover, the court raised doubts regarding the legitimacy of one of the petitioners, who claimed to be the son of Susuhunan Pakubuwono XII, the final ruler of the Surakarta Palace. The Minister of Youth and Sports Affairs, Roy Suryo, who is a relative of the Yogyakartan Keraton supports the decision of the Constitutional Court and, without explaining further, stated that there is a difference between the Surakarta Keraton and the Yogyakarta Keraton during the independence era. A member of the Surakarta Palace's Traditional Council, Satriyo Hadinagoro, criticizes the Constitutional Court's ruling and called it "funny and unreasonable" and said that his side would file another lawsuit. He also questioned Roy Suryo’s involvement in the palace conflict.

=== 2025 re-establishment debate ===
In late 2024 and early 2025, discussions resurfaced regarding the potential establishment of the Special Region of Surakarta in Indonesia. The proposal would involve separating the city of Surakarta (Solo) and its surrounding areas from Central Java Province, granting it a special provincial status akin to that of the Special Region of Yogyakarta. National attention to the idea increased on 24 April 2025, during a hearing of the House of Representatives (DPR) Commission II, which oversees regional governance. In the meeting, Akmal Malik, Director General of Regional Autonomy at the Ministry of Home Affairs, reported that, as of April 2025, 42 requests to form new provinces and six requests for special regional status, including that of Surakarta, had been submitted.

Aria Bima, Deputy Chair of DPR Commission II, highlighted the proposal for Surakarta, noting its historical and cultural significance. He stated that there had been input suggesting that Solo should be separated from Central Java and established as a special region. The public acknowledgment of the proposal in this forum brought renewed national attention to the issue. The latest wave of discussion marks the first major resurgence of the proposal in recent years, reaching higher political levels through parliamentary discourse and broader media coverage than previous attempts by the Surakarta Keraton. Aria Bima, the senior PDIP politician who first disclosed the suggestion to grant Surakarta special region status, provided a nuanced response to the idea. Although he is a native of Surakarta, Aria did not explicitly endorse the proposal; rather, he emphasized the need for strong justification and careful deliberation. He stated that any move to grant special status should not be taken hastily, highlighting that fairness among regions must be prioritized to prevent jealousy or division. Aria acknowledged that Surakarta's unique history, particularly its contributions to anti-colonial resistance and rich cultural identity, underpins the rationale for the proposal. However, he questioned whether such historical factors make the move urgent or necessary today. In his view, there is no pressing need for special status, suggesting that the DPR’s Commission II is not prioritizing the issue. He further argued that Solo has already evolved into a dynamic city without requiring special privileges, famously remarking that there’s nothing left that needs to be made ‘special’. While not dismissing the proposal entirely, Aria implied that if Indonesia were to revisit the creation of special regions, it should be done in tandem with reassessing the moratorium on new autonomous regions under stricter criteria, situating the discussion within the broader national policy framework on regional governance.

Minister of Home Affairs Tito Karnavian expressed cautious openness toward the proposal for a Special Region of Surakarta, emphasizing the importance of due process. He stated that any region may propose special status, but such proposals must satisfy specific criteria and undergo legislative procedures. Tito raffirming that submissions are allowed, but must be carefully assessed for justification. He clarified that establishing a new special region would require amending existing laws and obtaining approval from the House of Representatives (DPR). Speaking to reporters on 25 April 2025, he explained that the Ministry of Home Affairs would evaluate any formal proposal on Surakarta’s special status based on historical or sociocultural considerations. Tito further distinguished this proposal from the current national moratorium on the creation of new administrative regions, noting that a request for special region status differs from forming an ordinary new province. While the creation of a special region would still involve establishing a new autonomous administrative unit, it may be treated with separate considerations if it fulfills the required criteria.

From the Presidential Office (Istana), the official response to the proposal for a Special Region of Surakarta has been neutral. Deputy Minister of State Secretariat (Wamensesneg) Juri Ardiantoro stated that, as of the end of April 2025, there had been no formal discussion or decision regarding the proposal. He urged all parties to remain patient until any official deliberations take place. Juri further noted that he had not received detailed information on the specific justifications behind the proposal for Surakarta’s special status and observed that various regional reorganization proposals are currently under consideration across Indonesia.

== See also ==
- Provinces of Indonesia
- Central Java
- History of Surakarta
- Surakarta Sunanate
- Special Region of Yogyakarta
- Special Region of Kutai, a regency-level special region in Kalimantan

Preceded by Surakarta Sunanate; Mangkunegaran	Special Region of Surakarta/ Kasunanan Special Region and Mangkunagaran Special Region; 19 August 1945 - 16 June 1946	Succeeded by Surakarta
