= Pakubuwono XIII =

Susuhunan of Surakarta from 2004 to 2025

Pakubuwono XIII; ꦦꦑꦸꦨꦸꦮꦟ꧇꧑꧓꧇
- Sri Susuhunan Pakubuwana XIII
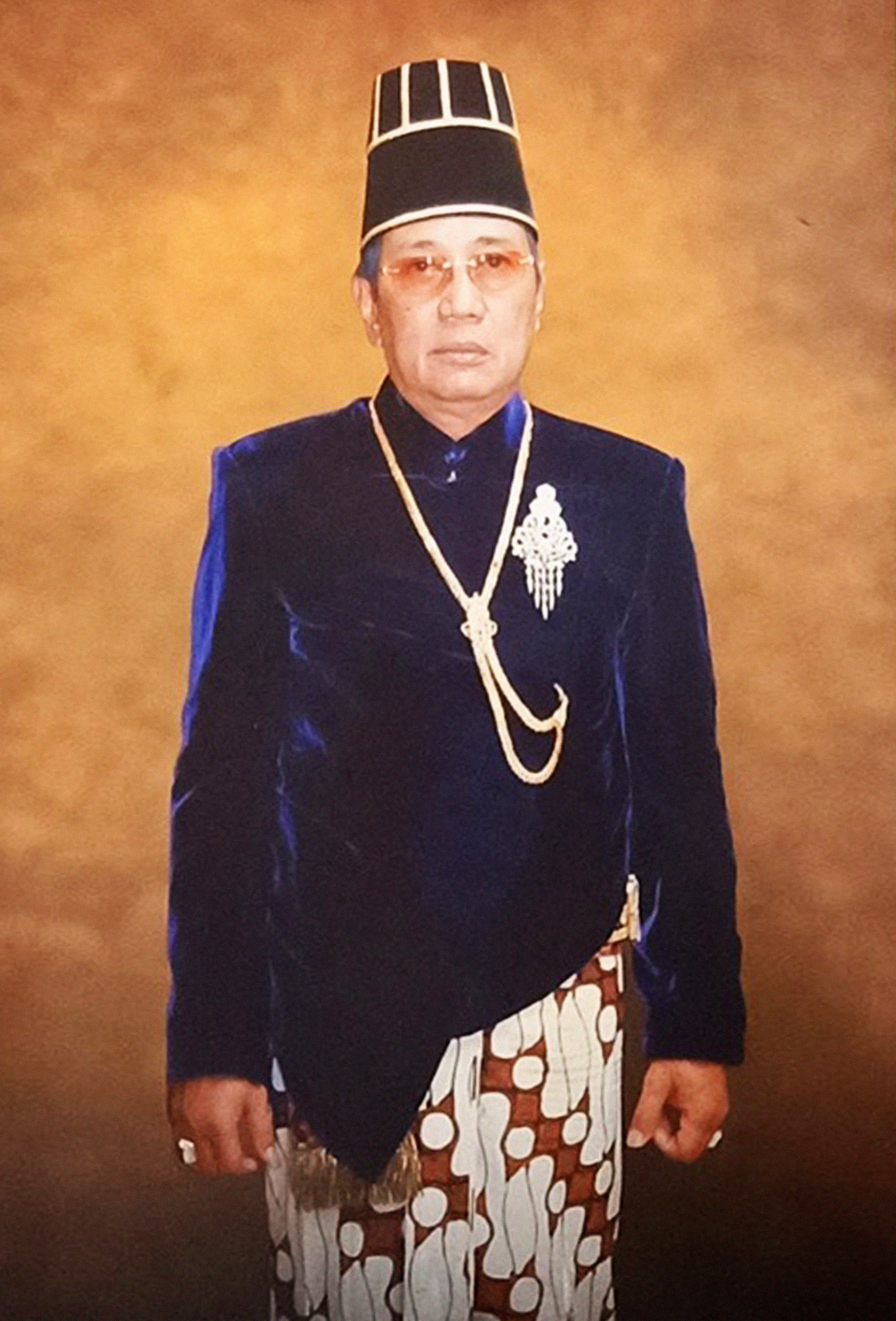
- Official portrait

12th Susuhunan of Surakarta
- Reign: 10 September 2004 – 2 November 2025
- Predecessor: Susuhunan Pakubuwana XII
- Successor: Susuhunan Pakubuwana XIV
- President: Megawati Sukarnoputri; Susilo Bambang Yudhoyono; Joko Widodo; Prabowo Subianto
- Born: Gusti Raden Mas Suryo Partono; 28 June 1948; Surakarta, Indonesia
- Died: 2 November 2025 (aged 77); Sukoharjo, Indonesia
- Burial: 5 November 2025; Astana Pajimatan Himagiri
- Spouse: KRAy. Kusumaningdyah (div.); KRAy. Winari (div.); GKR. Pakubuwana
- Issue more...: SISKS. Pakubuwana XIV (Hangabehi); SISKS. Pakubuwana XIV (Purbaya)
Names
- Kanjeng Gusti Pangeran Harya Hangabehi
Regnal name
- Sahandhap Dalem Sampeyan Dalem Ingkang Sinuhun Kangjeng Susuhunan Pakubuwana Senapati ing Alaga Abdurrahman Sayyidin Panatagama Ingkang Jumeneng kaping Tiga Welas ing Nagari Surakarta Hadiningrat
- House: Mataram
- Father: Susuhunan Pakubuwana XII
- Mother: KRAy. Pradapaningrum
- Religion: Islam

Sri Susuhunan Pakubuwono XIII (Javanese script: ꦯꦩ꧀ꦥꦺꦪꦤ꧀ꦢꦊꦩ꧀ꦲꦶꦁꦏꦁꦯꦶꦤꦸꦲꦸꦤ꧀ꦑꦁꦗꦼꦁꦯꦸꦱꦸꦲꦸꦤꦤ꧀ꦦꦏꦸꦧꦸꦮꦤ XIII; 28 June 1948 – 2 November 2025), born as Gusti Raden Mas Suryadi, later changed to Gusti Raden Mas Surya Pratana, and elevated to KGPH Hangabehi, was the twelfth Sunan of the Surakarta Sunanate from 2004 to 2025.

After the passing of the previous Sunan, the vacant throne was disputed by the two sons of the late Sunan, KGPH Hangabehi and KGPH Tedjowulan. The problem of succession arose because the sons had been born to different mothers but Pakubuwono XII had never formally appointed a queen consort. The oldest son, Kanjeng Gusti Pangeran Haryo Hangabehi, was appointed by the royal family as the court's ruler. (Kanjeng Gusti Pangeran Haryo is a Javanese regnal title, often abbreviated KGPH.) The younger son, KGPH Tedjowulan, then declared a walkout from the palace. Both sons subsequently claimed the title and each separately held a funeral for their father. However, family consensus recognized KGPH Hangabehi as SISKS Pakubuwono XIII.

From 18–19 July 2009, there was a ceremony in the kraton where the enthronement anniversary was conducted with the sacred Bedoyo Dance performed especially for the ceremony. Attendees included various local and foreign dignitaries as well as Hangabehi's half-brother Tedjowulan. In 2012 the disagreement about the kingship in the Sunanate of Surakarta was resolved after KGPH Tedjowulan acknowledged his half-brother as Pakubuwono XIII in an official reconciliation event initiated by Surakarta city government with the support of the national People's Representative Council. KGPH Tedjowulan himself became a mahapatih (viceregent) styled Kangjeng Gusti Pangeran Haryo Panembahan Agung.

== Early life ==
KGPH Hangabehi was the eldest son of Pakubuwono XII and his wife, Kanjeng Raden Ayu Pradoponingroem. His original name was Gusti Raden Mas Surjadi. As he was a sickly boy, his paternal grandmother, Gusti Kanjeng Ratu Pakubuwono, rechristened him GRM Surjo Partono, a title which was recognised by the Javanese community in accordance with Javanese spiritual advice. In 1979, paugeran (cultural custom) determined that he should bear the name Kangjeng Gusti Pangeran Haryo Hangabehi. This implied that as the eldest prince, he was being prepared as the future heir.

In official matters KGPH Hangabehi became pangageng (official) of the Keraton museum and took charge of numerous other important affairs. He was also awarded the 1st Sri Kabadya Star by Pakubuwono XII for his service in overcoming the great fire in the Surakarta Palace in 1985. KGPH Hangabehi was the only one of Pakubuwono XII's children to be awarded such a decoration. Other than some awards from several national and international institutions, KGPH Hangabehi also received an honorary degree from the Global University for Lifelong Learning (GULL), United States. His daily hobbies were no different from those of non-royal members. KGPH Hangabehi, other than playing the keyboard and riding supercharged motorcycles, was active in the Organisasi Amatir Radio Indonesia.

== Reign (2004–2025) ==
=== Succession ===
Upon the death of Pakubuwono XII in 2004, there was no clear heir to the throne because no official queen had ever been installed. The two half-brothers who were sons of Pakubuwono XII, Hangabehi and Tedjuwulan, had different mothers and both claimed the throne.

On 31 August 2004, the younger son KGPH Tedjowulan was crowned by some of his siblings in the Sasana Purnama residence. However, a meeting of Pakubuwono XII's children held earlier on 10 July 2004, had determined that the eldest prince, Hangabehi should be the next king and that his coronation would be held on 10 September 2004. In early September 2004, Tedjowulan and some of his followers made a sudden attack and battered the palace gates, causing some injuries to noblemen and court servants. The chairman of the Surakarta Palace Legal Institution, Kanjeng Pangeran Edy Wirabumi, reported details of the attack to the Surakarta Police. He noted that there had been destruction of cultural items in the vicinity of the court.

Some days later, on 10 September 2004, three of the court's elders – Gusti Pangeran Haryo Mataram, Bendoro Kanjeng Pangeran Haryo Prabuwinoto, and Gusti Raden Ayu Brotodiningrat – gave their blessing to Hangabehi as Pangeran Adipati Anom (crown prince) in the Surakarta Palace, lending legitimacy to Hangabehi's claim to be the new ruler of Surakarta.

=== Resolution ===
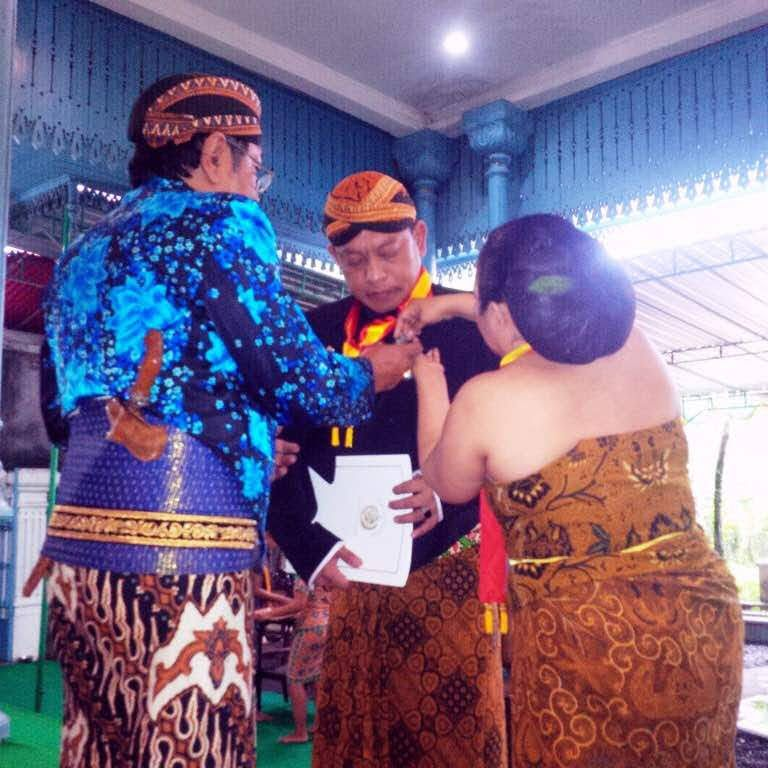
Sunan Pakubuwono XIII of Surakarta (left) granting an honorary degree in culture.

A reconciliation between KGPH Hangabehi and KGPH Tejowulan took place in 2012 at the initiative of the then-Mayor of Surakarta, Joko Widodo. A reconciliation signing was held in national Parliament House at Senayan in Jakarta, on 4 June 2012. The reconciliation was witnessed by various dignitaries including the Chair of People's Representative Council (DPR) Marzuki Alie, the Chairs of the 2nd, 4th, and 9th Committees of the DPR, representatives of the Ministries of Public Works, Home Affairs, Tourism and Creative Economy, the Governor of Central Java Bibit Waluyo, and the Mayor of Surakarta Joko Widodo. It had been agreed that KGPH Tedjowulan would relinquish the title of Pakubuwana XIII and that he would be granted title Kangjeng Gusti Pangeran Haryo Panembahan Agung. The title Pakubuwana XIII was conferred solely on KGPH Hangabehi. During the 8th ceremony of the Tingalandalem Jumenengan (coronation) on 15 June 2012, KGPH Tedjowulan was officially invited to attend the ceremony and he performed a traditional sungkem (kneeling) in front of Pakubuwono XIII as sign of respect.

However, there was often still friction between the separate groups within the Surakarta palace. Incidents in 2014 and 2016 indicated continuing problems. In 2017, it appeared that an important step had been taken to resolve the on-going disagreements within the royal families. In late April, Susuhunan Pakubuwono XIII Hangabehi was formally crowned at a large ceremony in the Surakarta Palace. The event was attended by hundreds of invitees, including Minister of Home Affairs Tjahjo Kumolo, Central Java Governor Ganjar Pranowo, Surakarta Mayor F. X. Hadi Rudyatmo and Soedjiatmi Notomihardjo, the mother of the President of Indonesia, Joko "Jokowi" Widodo.

== Death and funeral ==
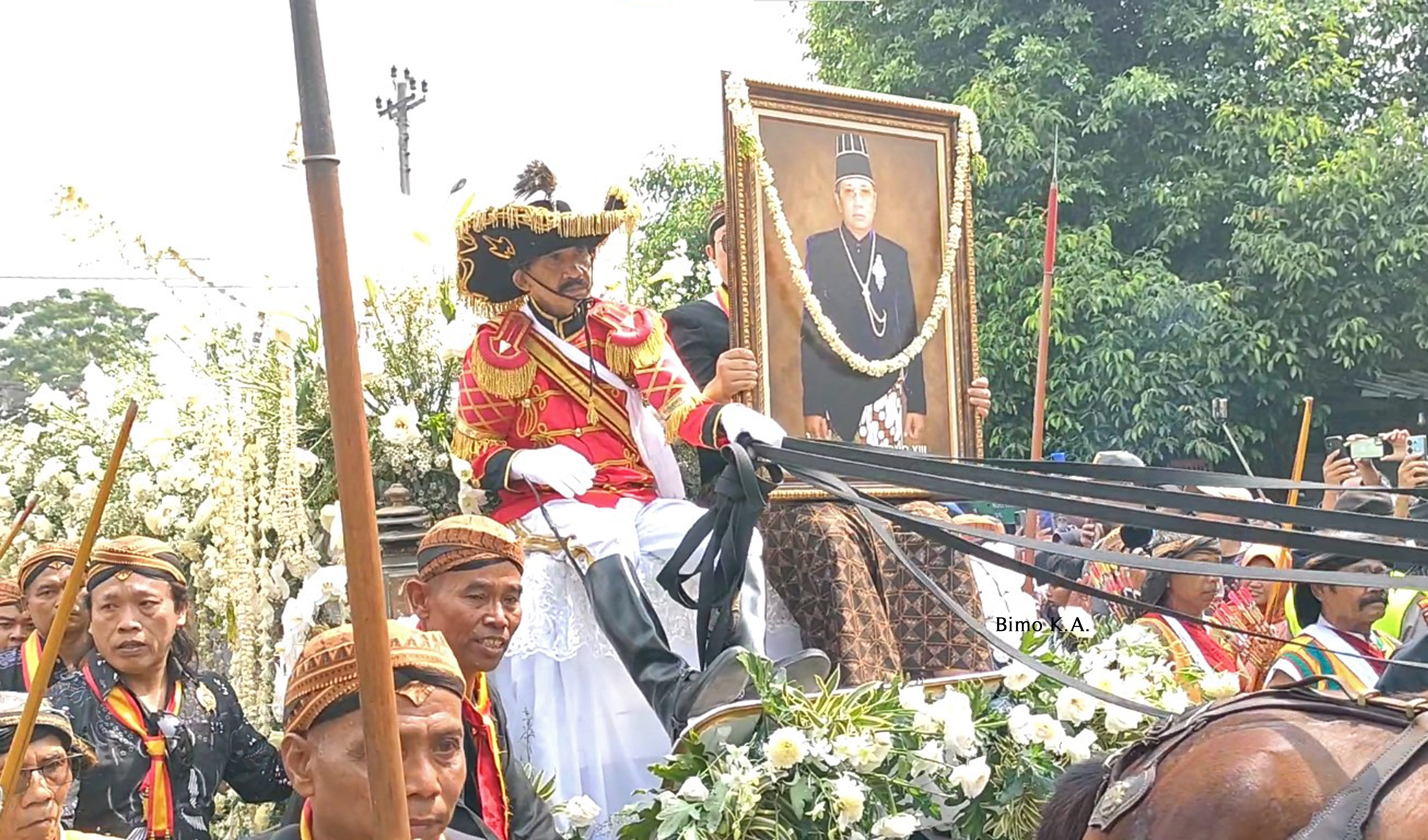
The Rata Pralaya (or Rata Laya) royal hearse carrying the coffin of Susuhunan Pakubuwana XIII through the Kamandungan Kidul courtyard of the Surakarta Hadiningrat Palace on 5 November 2025.

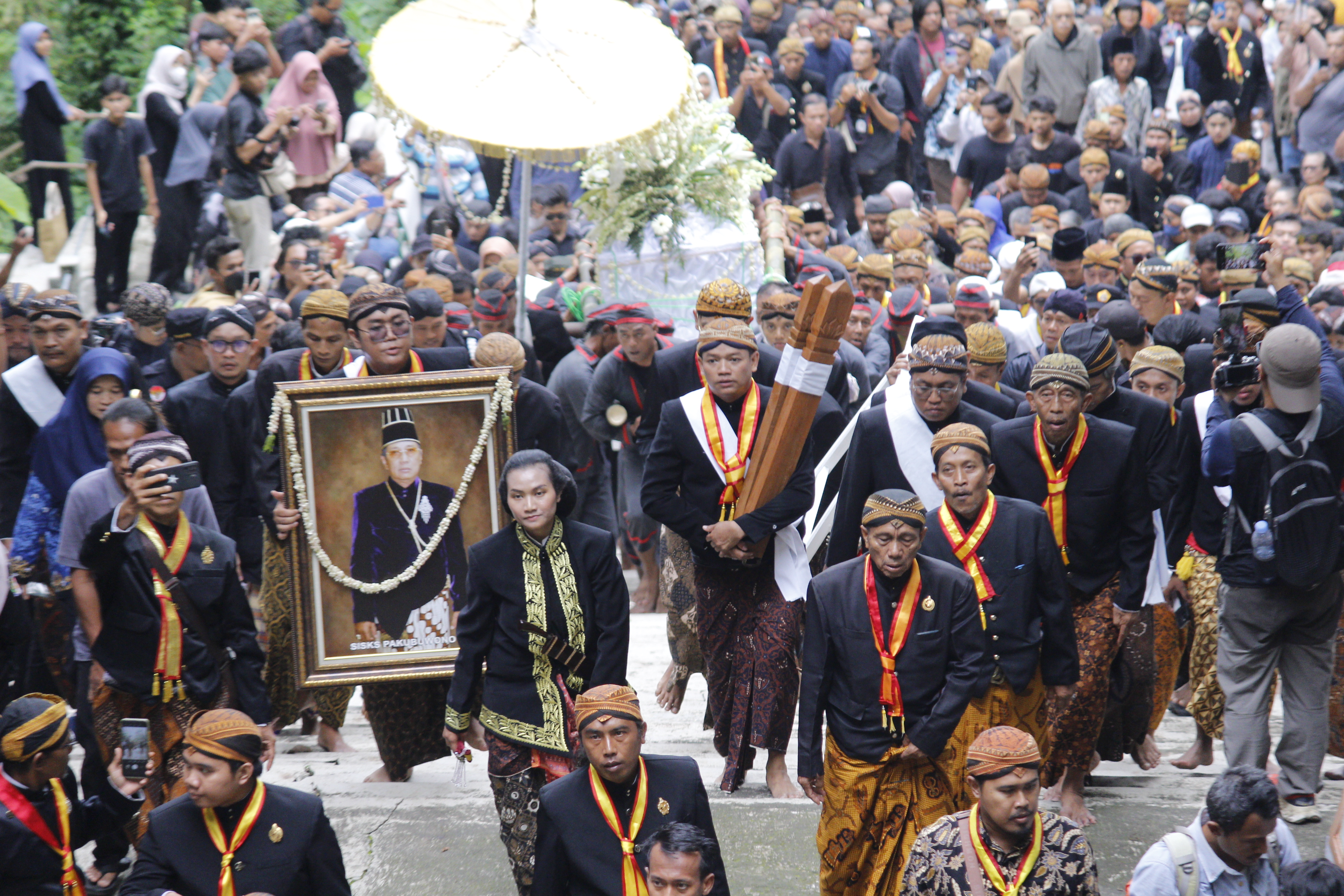
The funeral procession of Susuhunan Pakubuwana XIII at the Imogiri royal cemetery complex.

Susuhunan Pakubuwana XIII died (surud dalem) on the morning of Sunday, 2 November 2025, at Indriyati Solo Baru Hospital in Grogol, Sukoharjo Regency. His death was attributed to medical complications, including hyperglycemia and kidney failure, as well as factors related to old age. His health reportedly began to decline following the Adang Dal traditional ritual on 7 September 2025. The body lay in state at the Sasana Parasdya within the palace, where the public was permitted to pay their respects for four days.

Several prominent figures attended the wake, including former president Joko Widodo, Vice President Gibran Rakabuming Raka, and National Police Chief Listyo Sigit Prabowo. Other traditional monarchs in attendance included Sultan Hamengkubuwana X and Ratu Hemas of the Yogyakarta Sultanate, Mangkunegara X of the Mangkunegaran, Paku Alam X of the Pakualaman, Tengku Ariefanda Aziz of the Langkat Sultanate, and Edward Syah Pernong of the Sekala Brak Kingdom.

The funeral of Susuhunan Pakubuwana XIII was held on Wednesday, 5 November 2025, at 09:00 WIB, conducted according to palace traditions. The body was transported from the palace in the Rata Pralaya (also known as Rata Laya) royal hearse, which had previously been used for the funeral of his father, Pakubuwana XII, in 2004. The procession passed through Alun-Alun Kidul, Veteran Street, Yos Sudarso Street, and Slamet Riyadi Street before reaching the Loji Gandrung (the Mayor's official residence).

From Loji Gandrung, the remains were taken by ambulance to the Imogiri royal cemetery (Astana Pajimatan Himagiri). While a separate mausoleum (kedhaton) had been planned for Pakubuwana XIII, its construction was not yet complete at the time of his death. Consequently, he was temporarily interred next to his father's grave within the Pakubuwana X mausoleum complex.

== Family ==
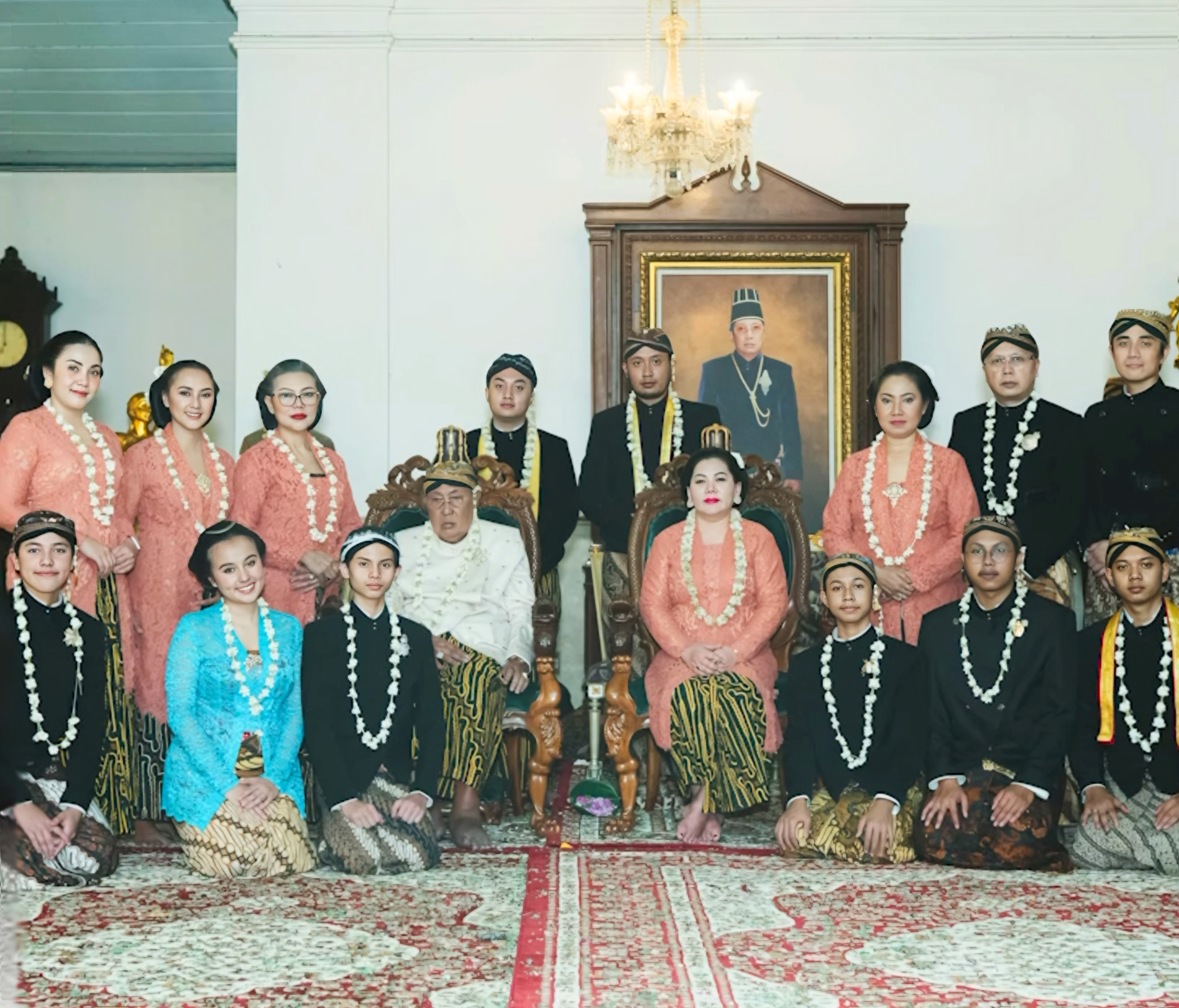
Sunan Pakubuwono XIII being photographed with GKR. Pakubuwono, GKR. Timoer, GRAy. Devi, GRAy. Ratih, GRAy. Putri, KGPH. Mangkubumi, KGPAA. Hamangkunegoro, as well as his sons-in-law, grandsons and granddaughter, after Kirab Pusaka 1 Suro Ceremony, 2024.

=== Marriage ===
Pakubuwono XIII married three times:

1. RAy. Nuk Kusumaningdyah/KRAy. Endang Kusumaningdyah (divorced)
2. Winari Sri Harjani/KRAy. Winari (divorced)
3. Asih Winarni/KRAy. Adipati Pradoponingsih/GKR. Pakubuwono (queen consort)

=== Sons ===
1. GRM. Suryo Suharto/KGPH. Mangkubumi/KGPH. Hangabehi
2. GRM. Suryo Aryo Mustiko/KGPH. Puruboyo/KGPAA. Hamangkunegoro Sudibyo Rojoputro Narendro Mataram (heir apparent)

=== Daughters ===
1. GRAy. Rumbai Kusuma Dewayani/GKR. Timoer
2. GRAy. Devi Lelyana Dewi
3. GRAy. Ratih Widyasari
4. BRAy. Sugih Oceania (deceased)
5. GRAy. Putri Purnaningrum

=== Grandchildren ===
1. BRM. Pramuditho Adiwiwoho
2. BRAj. Shayna Lelyana Sriro
3. BRM. Noah Satrio Sriro
4. BRM. Yudhistira Rachmat Saputro
5. BRM. Hersar Dewa
6. BRAj. Arumi Larasati
7. BRM. Suryo Wijaya Basudewa
