= Pakubuwono XI =

Tenth Susuhunan of Surakarta (1939–1945)

Pakubuwono XI; ꦥꦏꦸꦧꦸꦮꦤ꧇꧑꧑꧇
- Sri Susuhunan Pakubuwana XI
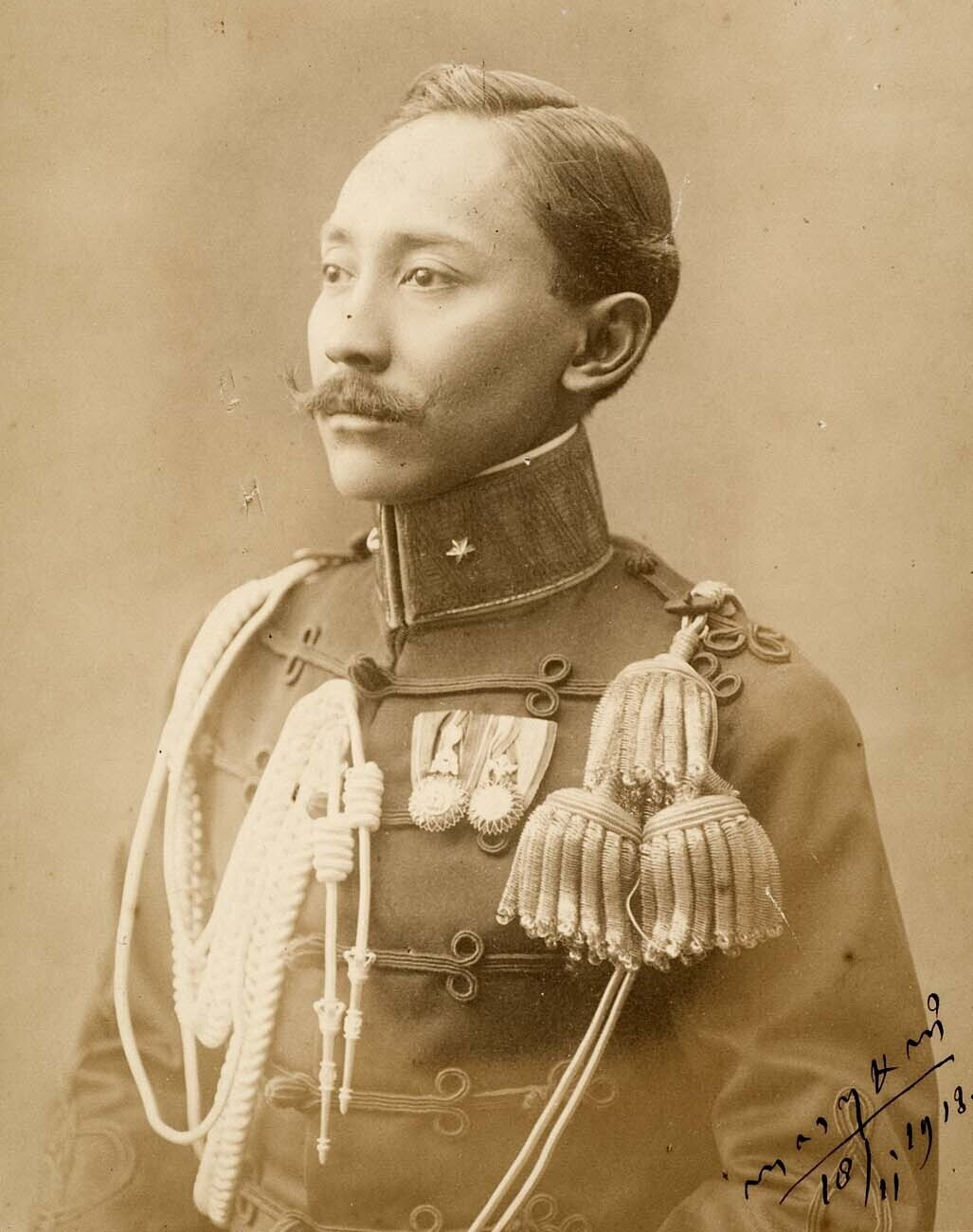

10th Susuhunan of Surakarta
- Reign: 26 April 1939 − 1 June 1945
- Coronation: 26 April 1939
- Predecessor: Susuhunan Pakubuwana X
- Successor: Susuhunan Pakubuwana XII
- Governor General: Alidius Tjarda van Starkenborgh
- Military Governor: Hitoshi Imamura; Kumakichi Harada; Yuichiro Nagano
- Born: Bendara Raden Mas Antasena; 1 February 1886; Surakarta, Dutch East Indies
- Died: 1 June 1945 (aged 59); Surakarta, Japanese East Indies
- Burial: Astana Pajimatan Himagiri
- Spouse: Gusti Kanjeng Ratu Kencana (m. 1908; died 1912) Gusti Kanjeng Ratu Pakubuwana (m. 1924)
- Issue more...: KGPH. Mangkubumi; GBKP. Hangabehi; SISKS. Pakubuwana XII
Regnal name
- Sahandhap Dalem Sampeyan Dalem Ingkang Sinuhun Kangjeng Susuhunan Pakubuwana Senapati ing Alaga Abdurrahman Sayyidin Panatagama Ingkang Jumeneng kaping Sewelas ing Nagari Surakarta Hadiningrat
- House: Mataram
- Father: Susuhunan Pakubuwana X
- Mother: Raden Ayu Mandayarêtna

Pakubuwono XI (also transliterated as Pakubuwana XI; 1 February 1886 – 1 June 1945) was the tenth Susuhunan of Surakarta during the Second World War, including the Japanese occupation of Java.

In his capacity as the eleventh Susuhunan, Pakubuwono XI was an officer à la suite of the Royal Netherlands East Indies Army (KNIL). He was made a major general of the KNIL on 15 April 1939.

== Heir apparent ==
He was born as Raden Mas Ontoseno, he was the son of Pakubuwono X and his concubine. His mother, Raden Ajeng Siti Supiyah, or Raden Ayu Mandayarêtna upon entering the inner court, was a daughter of Raden Mas Panji Sumataruna, son of Bendara Raden Mas Harya Kusumawinata, son of Kanjeng Gusti Pangeran Harya Mangkubumi I. Thus, she was a great-great-granddaughter of Pakubuwana III. Another source record her as a daughter of Raden Mas Panji Sumawinata.

Upon reaching adulthood, he was styled as Gusti Bendara Kanjeng Pangeran Hangabehi and was crowned as Susuhunan Pakubuwana XI on 26 April 1939.

The appointment GBKP. Hangabehi, as Pakubuwono XI wasn't without conflict, due to Pakubuwono X's preference for BKPH. Koesoemojoedo (Raden Mas Abimanjoe), GBKP. Hangabehi's younger half-brother, to succeed him. Moreover, from the Dutch colonial government's point of view, BKPH. Koesoemojoedo was a strong personality Javanese nobleman who was interested in the court's financial and administrative affairs. On the other hand, BKPH. Hangabehi's position was also strong, mainly from the majority of the anti-Dutch court's elites. Pakubuwono X himself had more than 60 children. A wedging problem was that Pakubuwono X had no son from his two queen consorts. The eldest sons, GBKP. Hangabehi and BKPH. Koesoemojoedo were born from concubines. In 1898, Pakubuwono X had actually intended to appoint BKPH. Koesoemojoedo as a crown prince, although he was born 40 days after GBKP. Hangabehi's birth. However, Pakubuwono X abandoned his plan, and he chose BKPH. Hangabehi as the heir.

GBKP. Hangabehi was given many important positions, such as wedana tengen (chancellor) and Vice-Chairman of Raad Nagari, a royal advisory council. He was also tasked by his father to attend 40th jubilee of Queen Wilhelmina's coronation in the Netherlands.

== Reign ==
In the late November 1938, Pakubuwono X was severely ill, and died 3 months later. On the advice of Parliament of the Netherlands, Governor-General Alidius Warmoldus Lambertus Tjarda van Starkenborgh Stachouwer chose GBKP. Hangabehi to succeed his father as Pakubuwono XI. Pakubuwono XI's coronation was accompanied by political contract which reduced Susuhunan's suzerainty, which mentioned that Pakubuwono XI would be deposed if he couldn't fulfill his obligation as determined in political contract, plus the withholding of royal expenditure budget dramatically.

Pakubuwono XI's reign was marked by difficult era, coincided with World War II. He also experienced the transfer of colonial government, from the Netherlands to Japan since 1942. The Japanese dubbed Surakarta Sunanate as Solo Koo. In Japanese colonial era, there was inflation which severed royal and nobility's finances. The Japanese also confiscated most of court's assets, which caused Pakubuwono XI fell ill. After his death on 1 June, 1945, he was succeeded by his very young son, styled Pakubuwono XII.

== Personal life ==
A letter from Kanjeng Raden Adipati Sasradiningrat IV, the patih dalem to the Resident of Surakarta dated on 29 December 1900 (29 Ruwah Je 1830 AJ) informed the impending marriages of the four members of the royal family would be held on 10 April 1901 (20 Besar Je 1830 AJ); among them was the marriage of Kanjeng Pangeran Angabei to Sasradiningrat's daughter, Raden Ajeng Maryati. However, Biwaddha Raja Mangunlêksana recorded the marriage of Gusti Bendara Kanjeng Pangeran Angabei and Raden Ajeng Kusmaryati, daughter of Kanjeng Raden Adipati Sasradiningrat IV by his primary consort was held on 1908. She died in 1912, and posthumously installed as Gusti Kanjeng Ratu Kencana.

He married for the second time on 17 July 1924 (14 Besar Je 1854) to Raden Ajeng Kuspariyah, a daughter Kanjeng Raden Mas Tumenggung Arya Puspadiningrat. Her mother, Raden Ayu Puspadiningrat (née Raden Ajeng Maryanah or Kus Maryanah) was the elder sister of Ratu Kencana.

== Family ==
- Principal consort of the Prince Hangabehi (Gusti Bendara Raden Ayu Hangabehi), maiden name Raden Ajeng Maryati, posthumously elevated to Gusti Kanjeng Ratu Kencana
  - Gusti Raden Mas Saliman, titled Kanjeng Bendara Raden Mas Arya Murdaningrat, later Kanjeng Gusti Pangeran Harya Mangkubumi
  - Gusti Raden Ajeng Saparinten, titled Gusti Kanjeng Ratu Hayu
    - Married her first cousin, Bendara Kanjeng Pangeran Harya Sumadiningrat, son of Bendara Kanjeng Pangeran Harya Kusumayuda
  - Gusti Raden Ajeng Samsiah, titled Gusti Kanjeng Ratu Bendara
  - Gusti Raden Ajeng Kus Sapatinten, titled Gusti Kanjeng Ratu Candrakirana
    - Married Prof. Mr. Kanjeng Raden Tumenggung Djoko Marsaid Tirtohadiningrat
- Queen consort, Gusti Kanjeng Ratu Pakubuwana, maiden name Raden Ajeng Kuspariyah
  - Gusti Raden Mas Surya Guritna, titled Kanjeng Gusti Pangeran Harya Purbaya, later Pakubuwana XII
  - Gusti Raden Ajeng Sapariyam, titled Gusti Kanjeng Ratu Sekar Kedhaton, also known as Putri Tineke
- Concubine, Raden Ayu Dayaresmi
- Concubine, Raden Ayu Dayaningsih
  - Bendara Raden Mas Danurwinda, titled Gusti Bendara Kanjeng Pangeran Hangabehi
  - Bendara Raden Mas Surya Lelana, titled Bendara Kanjeng Pangeran Harya Prabuwijaya
  - Bendara Raden Ajeng Suprapti
- Concubine, Raden Ayu Dayasuma
- Concubine, Raden Ayu Daya Asmara
  - Bendara Raden Mas Surya Suksara, titled Bendara Kanjeng Pangeran Harya Natapura
  - Bendara Raden Mas Darmaja, titled Bendara Kanjeng Pangeran Harya Bintara
- Concubine, Raden Ayu Dayaningrat

== Ancestry ==
Ancestors of Pakubuwono XI

Pakubuwana VI
Pakubuwana IX
Gusti Kanjeng Ratu Hemas
Pakubuwana X
Kanjeng Pangeran Harya Hadiwijaya II
Gusti Kanjeng Ratu Pakubuwana
Gusti Kanjeng Ratu Bendara
Pakubuwana XI
Bendara Raden Mas Harya Kusumawinata
Raden Mas Panji Sumataruna
Raden Ayu Mandayarêtna

Preceded by Pakubuwono X	Susuhunan of Surakarta; 1939–1945	Succeeded by Pakubuwono XII
