= Hardjonagoro =

Kanjeng Raden Tumenggung Hardjonagoro
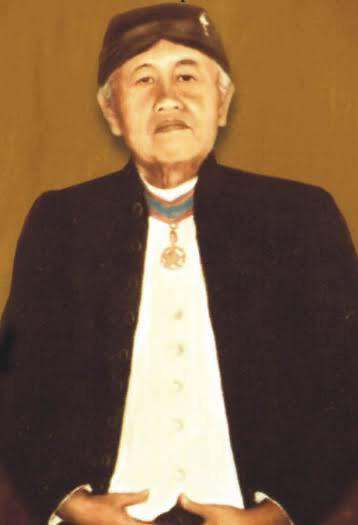
- Portrait of KRT Hardjonagoro (Go Tik Swan)
- Born: May 11, 1931; Surakarta, Kasunanan Surakarta, Hindia Belanda
- Died: November 5, 2008 (aged 77); Surakarta
- Resting place: TPU Daksinoloyo Danyung, Grogol
- Other name: Go Tik Swan
- Known for: Batik innovations, cultural contributions

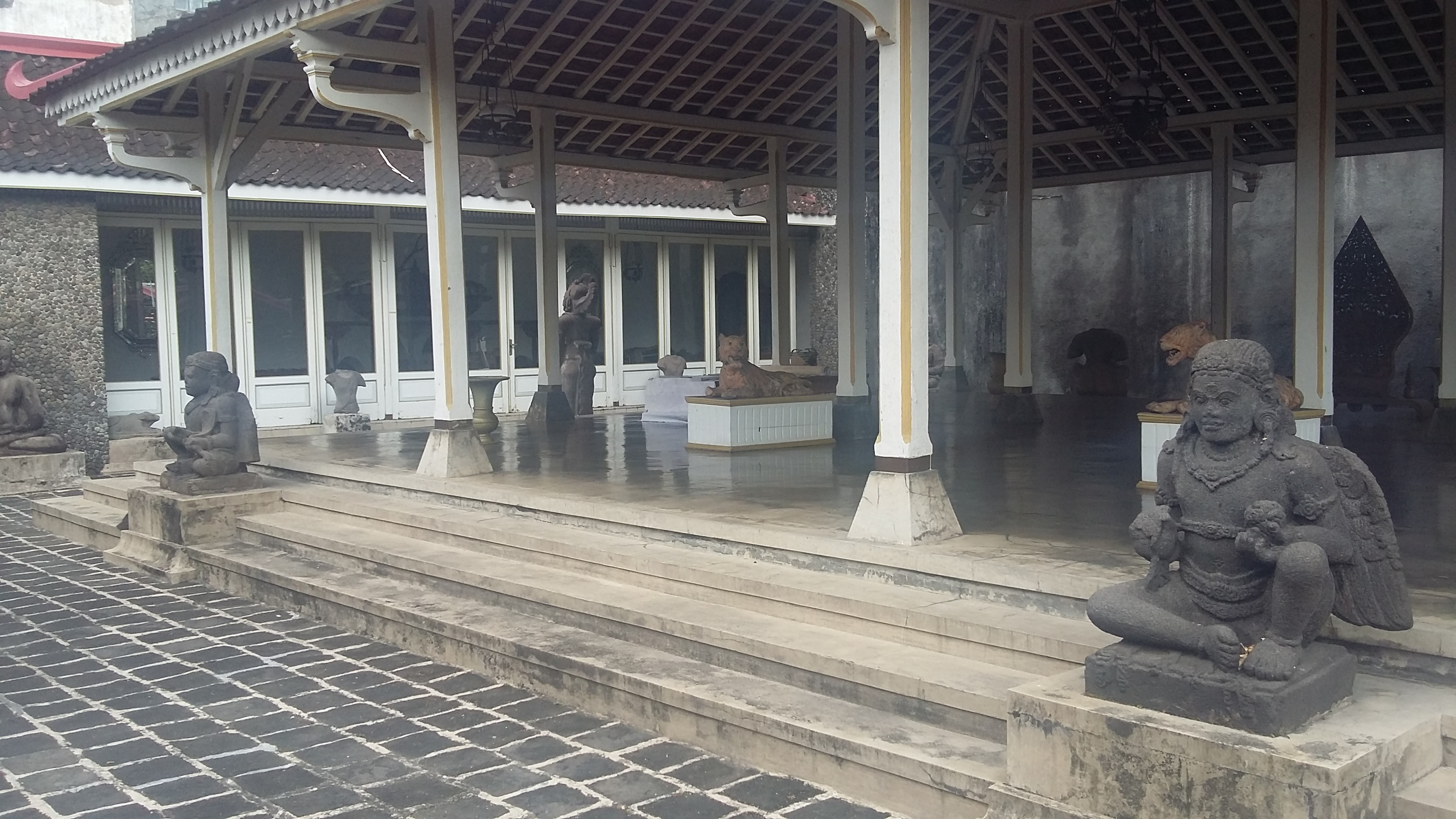
K.R.T. Hardjonagoro's home in Surakarta

Go Tik Swan, often identified by his royal title and Javanese name K.R.T. Hardjonagoro (May 11, 1931, - November 5, 2008), was an Indonesian cultural figure, batik artist, and writer from Surakarta, Central Java.

Tik Swan was the firstborn son in a high-status Chinese family (or Cabang Atas) in Surakarta. He was raised by his maternal grandfather, Tjan Khay Sing, a batik merchant in Solo. His grandfather owned four batik factories: two in Kratonan, one in Ngapenan, and one in Kestalan. The factories employed a total of about 1,000 people.

== Childhood ==
When he was young, Tik Swan spent time in his grandfather's batik factories, where he learned about the basics of creating batik. He also listened to the workers as they sang traditional Javanese songs and told traditional stories. From them and from other places in the community, he learned the basics of Javanese arts and Javanese writing.

As he was descended from prominent members of the Chinese community, with great-grandparents who held the rank of Kapitan Cina in Boyolali Regency and Surakarta, Tik Swan attended the Neutrale Europesche Lagere School with other upper class children, including the children of courtiers the Surakarta Sunanate and Dutch dignitaries.

Tik Swan also studied Javanese gamelan and dance in the community, for example in the residences of Pangeran Hamidjojo, Pakubuwono X's son, and Pangeran Prabuwinoto.

== Education ==
After World War II and the fight for Indonesian independence, Tik Swan studied at Meer Uitgebreid Lager Onderwijs in Semarang. His parents then wanted him to study economics at the University of Indonesia, however he was interested in Javanese culture and arts and instead studied Javanese literature at the University of Indonesia. Professor Dr. Tjan Tjoe Siem and Professor Dr. R.M.Ng. Poerbatjaraka had a large impact on his studies at the University of Indonesia.

When studying in Jakarta, Tik Swan often visited Poerbatjarka's house, where he studied Javanese dance. For the University of Indonesia's anniversary celebrations, his dance troupe was invited to perform at the presidential palace. President Sukarno was impressed by his dancing.

== "Batik Indonesia" and other batik work ==
When he learned that Tik Swan was descended from baitk makers, Sukarno suggested that he create "Batik Indonesia," a kind of revival of batik in the Indonesian nation. Intrigued, upon his return to Solo he began to study the history and philosophy of batik, also journeying to Bali and Java's north coast for this purpose. Because of his close relationship with the Surakarta Sunanate, Tik Swan was also able to study heirloom batik patterns from Pakubuwono XII's mother. She had developed new designs based on traditional patterns and symbols.

Tik Swan then opened a batik factory focused on hand-drawn designs in Solo. These efforts were supported by Sukarno and eventually led to the development of "Batik Indonesia." To create "Batik Indonesia," Tik Swan incorporated bright colors into the browns, blues, and yellows commonly found in Solonese and Yogyanese batik. At that time, bright colors were only used in Pekalongan batik, which employed mostly floral patterns that had different symbolic meaning than those in Solonese and Yogyanese batik. He also enlarged traditional batik patterns to create more dramatic designs. Tik Swan's "Batik Indonesia" was consciously Indonesian, as opposed to Javanese. Over the years, he created many unique batik designs.

As Tik Swan became more well-known as a batik maker, he was regularly invited to the presidential palace for batik exhibitions. However, during the New Order regime Tik Swan grew disillusioned with the commercial nature of batik production and the government's policies in general. During this time he created the kembang bangah batik pattern, based on a flower that grows in gutters and has a foul smell.

== Other contributions ==
Tik Swan founded the Kraton Surakarta Art Gallery/Museum. He also founded a society to study Javanese kris and spears and played a large role in renewed interest in kris making in Solo. He chaired the Radya Pustaka Museum's presidium for many years. He received medals from both the Kraton Surakarta and the Indonesian government.
