= Provinces of Indonesia =

First-level administrative divisions of Indonesia

Provinces of Indonesia Provinsi Indonesia (Indonesian)
- Category: First-level administrative division of unitary state
- Location: Republic of Indonesia
- Created: 18 August 1945
- Number: 38
- Populations: South Papua (549,700) – West Java (50,759,000) in mid 2025
- Areas: Jakarta 661.53 km^{2} (255.42 sq mi) – Central Kalimantan 153,430.36 km^{2} (59,239.79 sq mi)
- Government: Provincial government
- Subdivisions: Regencies and cities

Provinces (Indonesian: provinsi) are the first-level administrative divisions of Indonesia. They were formerly called first-level provincial regions (provinsi daerah tingkat I), before the Reform era. Provinces have a local government, consisting of a governor (Gubernur), a Vice-Governor and a regional legislative body (Dewan Perwakilan Rakyat Daerah Provinsi, DPRD Provinsi). The governor and members of local representative bodies are elected by popular vote for five-year terms, but governors can only serve for two terms. Provincial governments have the authority to regulate and manage their own government affairs, subject to the limits of the central government. The average land area of all 38 provinces in Indonesia (which totals 1,890,179.8 km^{2}) is about 49,767.9 km^{2} (19,215.5 sq mi), and they had an average population of 7,485,232 people in mid-2025.

Indonesia is divided into 38 provinces, nine of which have special autonomous status. The terms for special status are "Istimewa" and "Khusus", which translate to "special", or "designated". Provinces are further divided into regencies and cities (formerly called second-level region regencies/cities, or kabupaten/kotamadya daerah tingkat II), which are in turn subdivided into districts (kecamatan). Proposals for the creation of additional provinces (by the splitting of existing ones) have been considered by the Indonesian government, but further action has been suspended since 2013 under a moratorium. However, in 2022, nine years later, Central Papua, Highland Papua, South Papua, and Southwest Papua were created and became the youngest provinces in the country. The enactment of the Law on State Capital in 2022 established a future provincial-level city, Nusantara, which would officially become the 39th province after a presidential decree on relocating the state capital is issued, and it would replace Jakarta as the nation's capital city.

== Background ==
Article 18 paragraph 1 of the 1945 Constitution states that "the Unitary State of the Republic of Indonesia is divided into provincial regions and those provincial regions are divided into regencies and cities, whereby every one of those provinces, regencies, and municipalities has its regional government, which shall be regulated by laws." This constitutional framework is applied across a geographically dispersed archipelago, reinforcing administrative cohesion over both terrestrial and maritime regions, in line with Indonesia's recognition as a unified archipelagic state under international law.

== Government ==
In the 1945 Constitution of the Republic of Indonesia (UUD 1945), Article 18, Paragraph (1) states that:

The Unitary State of the Republic of Indonesia is divided into provinces, and these provinces are further divided into regencies and cities; each province, regency, and city has its own regional government, which is regulated by law.

According to the 1945 Constitution, a province is an autonomous region whose government consists of a regional head—referred to as a "governor"—and a regional legislative body known as the Regional House of Representatives (DPRD). Regional governments have the authority to regulate and manage their own governmental affairs based on the principles of regional autonomy and the "duty of assistance" (*tugas pembantuan*), exercising the broadest possible autonomy, excluding those governmental affairs that are designated by law as the purview of the Central Government of Indonesia.

Furthermore, according to Law No. Under Law No. 23 of 2014 concerning Regional Government, a province—in addition to its status as an autonomous region—also serves as an administrative division. It functions as the operational jurisdiction for the governor, who acts as the "representative of the Central Government" and oversees the administration of general governmental affairs within the province. In carrying out these general governmental affairs, the governor is accountable to the President of the Republic of Indonesia through the Minister of Home Affairs.

The 1945 Constitution of the Republic of Indonesia also stipulates that the Indonesian state recognizes and respects regional government units that possess special or distinct characteristics, as regulated by law.

=== Authority ===
According to the Law on Regional Government (UU 23/2014) the authority of the Provincial Government includes:

1. Development planning and control;
2. Planning, utilization, and community peace;
3. Implementation of public order and public peace;
4. Provision of public facilities and infrastructure;
5. Handling the health sector;
6. Education and allocation of potential human resources;
7. Handling social problems across regencies/cities;
8. Services in the field of manpower across regencies/cities;
9. Facilitating the development of cooperatives, small and medium enterprises, including across districts/cities;
10. Environmental control;
11. Defense services, including across regencies/cities;
12. Population and civil registration services;
13. Government general administration services;
14. Investment administration services, including across regencies/cities;
15. The implementation of other basic services that cannot be carried out by regencies/cities; and
16. Other mandatory affairs mandated by laws and regulations.

The authority of the provincial government are government affairs which are located across regencies/municipalities, government affairs whose users are across regencies/municipalities, government affairs whose benefits or negative impacts lie across regencies/municipalities, government affairs which use more resources. efficient if carried out by the province.

Each province has a local government, headed by a governor and a legislative body (DPRD). The governor and members of local representative bodies are elected by popular vote for five-year terms, but governors can only serve for two terms. The general election to elect members of the DPRDs is conducted simultaneously with the national general election. Previously, the general elections for Governor and Vice Governor were not held simultaneously. However, since 2015 regional head elections have been held simultaneously. Under the plan, simultaneous partial local elections were held in February 2017, June 2018 and December 2020, culminating in simultaneous elections for all local executive posts in November 2024 and then every five years.

== Current provinces ==
Click on a province name to go to its main article

| Code | | Coat of arms | Name | | City | | Geographical unit | Land Area (km^{2}) | Population (mid 2025) | Density per km^{2} (mid 2025) | 2nd Level | |
| # | ISO ID- | Coat of arms | English | Indonesian | Capital | Largest | Geographical unit | Land Area (km^{2}) | Population (mid 2025) | Density per km^{2} (mid 2025) | Cities | Reg. |
|---|---|---|---|---|---|---|---|---|---|---|---|---|
| 11 | AC | | Aceh | | Banda Aceh | | Sumatra | 56,835.02 | 5,626,000 | 99 | 5 | 18 |
| 12 | SU | | North Sumatra | Sumatera Utara | Medan | | Sumatra | 72,437.76 | 15,785,800 | 218 | 8 | 25 |
| 13 | SB | | West Sumatra | Sumatera Barat | Padang | | Sumatra | 42,107.67 | 5,914,300 | 140 | 7 | 12 |
| 14 | RI | | Riau | | Pekanbaru | | Sumatra | 89,900.78 | 6,811,200 | 76 | 2 | 10 |
| 15 | JA | | Jambi | | Jambi | | Sumatra | 49,023.04 | 3,768,500 | 77 | 2 | 9 |
| 16 | SS | | South Sumatra | Sumatera Selatan | Palembang | | Sumatra | 86,771.92 | 8,928,500 | 103 | 4 | 13 |
| 17 | BE | | Bengkulu | | Bengkulu | | Sumatra | 20,122.21 | 2,138,000 | 106 | 1 | 9 |
| 18 | LA | | Lampung | | Bandar Lampung | | Sumatra | 33,570.76 | 9,522,900 | 284 | 2 | 13 |
| 19 | BB | | Bangka Belitung Islands | Kepulauan Bangka Belitung | Pangkal Pinang | | Sumatra | 16,690.23 | 1,550,800 | 93 | 1 | 6 |
| 21 | KR | | Riau Islands | Kepulauan Riau | Tanjung Pinang | Batam | Sumatra | 8,170.38 | 2,213,500 | 268 | 2 | 5 |
| 31 | JK | | Special Capital Region of Jakarta | Daerah Khusus Ibukota Jakarta | Central Jakarta (de facto) (Note: Jakarta is a city with province-level Special Capital Region status comprising five Kota Administrasis (administrative cities/municipalities) and one Kabupaten Administrasi (administrative regency). It has no de jure capital, but many governmental buildings are located at Central Jakarta.) | East Jakarta | Java | 661.53 | 10,678,000 | 16,155 | 5 | 1 |
| 32 | JB | | West Java | Jawa Barat | Bandung | Bekasi | Java | 37,053.33 | 50,759,000 | 1,370 | 9 | 18 |
| 33 | JT | | Central Java | Jawa Tengah | Semarang | | Java | 34,347.43 | 38,233,900 | 1,113 | 6 | 29 |
| 34 | YO | | Special Region of Yogyakarta | Daerah Istimewa Yogyakarta | Yogyakarta | | Java | 3,170.36 | 3,781,500 | 1,193 | 1 | 4 |
| 35 | JI | | East Java | Jawa Timur | Surabaya | | Java | 48,055.88 | 42,089,300 | 876 | 9 | 29 |
| 36 | BT | | Banten | | Serang | Tangerang | Java | 9,355.88 | 12,537,400 | 1,341 | 4 | 4 |
| 51 | BA | | Bali | | Denpasar | | Lesser Sunda Islands | 5,582.83 | 4,461,300 | 798 | 1 | 8 |
| 52 | NB | | West Nusa Tenggara | Nusa Tenggara Barat | Mataram | | Lesser Sunda Islands | 19,631.99 | 5,731,100 | 291 | 2 | 8 |
| 53 | NT | | East Nusa Tenggara | Nusa Tenggara Timur | Kupang | | Lesser Sunda Islands | 46,378.11 | 5,742,600 | 124 | 1 | 21 |
| 61 | KB | | West Kalimantan | Kalimantan Barat | Pontianak | | Kalimantan | 147,018.06 | 5,766,000 | 39 | 2 | 12 |
| 62 | KT | | Central Kalimantan | Kalimantan Tengah | Palangka Raya | | Kalimantan | 153,430.36 | 2,845,000 | 19 | 1 | 13 |
| 63 | KS | | South Kalimantan | Kalimantan Selatan | Banjarbaru | Banjarmasin | Kalimantan | 37,125.43 | 4,323,300 | 116 | 2 | 11 |
| 64 | KI | | East Kalimantan (Note: Figures adjusted to take account of the separation of Tarakan city and four regencies, as confirmed by Badan Pusat Statistik, to form the new province of North Kalimantan, listed separately in this table.) | Kalimantan Timur | Samarinda | | Kalimantan | 126,951.76 | 4,267,600 | 34 | 3 | 7 |
| 65 | KU | | North Kalimantan | Kalimantan Utara | Tanjung Selor | Tarakan | Kalimantan | 69,900.89 | 749,400 | 11 | 1 | 4 |
| 71 | SA | | North Sulawesi | Sulawesi Utara | Manado | | Sulawesi | 14,488.43 | 2,721,400 | 188 | 4 | 11 |
| 72 | ST | | Central Sulawesi | Sulawesi Tengah | Palu | | Sulawesi | 61,496.98 | 3,156,100 | 51 | 1 | 12 |
| 73 | SN | | South Sulawesi | Sulawesi Selatan | Makassar | | Sulawesi | 45,323.98 | 9,563,100 | 211 | 3 | 21 |
| 74 | SG | | Southeast Sulawesi | Sulawesi Tenggara | Kendari | | Sulawesi | 36,139.30 | 2,836,700 | 78 | 2 | 15 |
| 75 | GO | | Gorontalo | | Gorontalo | | Sulawesi | 12,024.98 | 1,242,200 | 103 | 1 | 5 |
| 76 | SR | | West Sulawesi | Sulawesi Barat | Mamuju | | Sulawesi | 16,590.67 | 1,525,300 | 92 | —N/a | 6 |
| 81 | MA | | Maluku | | Ambon | | Maluku Islands | 46,133.83 | 1,970,600 | 43 | 2 | 9 |
| 82 | MU | | North Maluku | Maluku Utara | Sofifi | Ternate | Maluku Islands | 31,465.98 | 1,373,800 | 42 | 2 | 8 |
| 91 | PA | | Papua | Papua | Jayapura | | Western New Guinea | 81,383.32 | 1,073,600 | 13 | 1 | 8 |
| 92 | PB | | West Papua (Note: West Papua was created from the western portion of Papua province in February 2003, initially under the name of Irian Jaya Barat, and was renamed Papua Barat (West Papua) on 7 February 2007. The split remains controversial. In November 2004, the Constitutional Court of Indonesia ruled that the split violated Papua's autonomy laws. However, since the western province had already been created, it should remain separate from Papua. The ruling also aborted the creation of another proposed province, Central Irian Jaya, because the proposed split had not yet been completed. ISO 3166-2 codes have subsequently been published for all of the newly-created provinces in Indonesian Papua.) | Papua Barat | Manokwari | | Western New Guinea | 60,308.59 | 587,600 | 10 | —N/a | 7 |
| 93 | PS | | South Papua | Papua Selatan | Merauke | | Western New Guinea | 117,858.97 | 549,700 | 5 | —N/a | 4 |
| 94 | PT | | Central Papua | Papua Tengah | Nabire | Timika | Western New Guinea | 61,079.59 | 1,492,300 | 24 | —N/a | 8 |
| 95 | PE | | Highland Papua | Papua Pegunungan | Jayawijaya | | Western New Guinea | 52,508.66 | 1,484,900 | 29 | —N/a | 8 |
| 96 | PD | | Southwest Papua | Papua Barat Daya | Sorong | | Western New Guinea | 39,103.06 | 636,400 | 16 | 1 | 5 |

== Special autonomy ==
The decentralization of some power and autonomy to provinces is called for by Article 18 of the Constitution of Indonesia, and this article was expanded through amendments in October 1999 in the period following the fall of Suharto. Some provinces have been granted additional autonomy beyond this, although Indonesia is not a federated state. The form this special autonomy takes is not standardized, with provinces gaining different formulations of specific autonomy based on particular political imperatives.

- The Special Region of Yogyakarta, which was autonomous under Dutch rule, was (along with Surakarta) given consideration for autonomy as part of Law no. 1 of 1945. Autonomy for Yogyakarta was confirmed directly through Law no. 3 of 1950, the first granting of special autonomy to a province. This status has been maintained until the present, with some tweaks from additional laws. Sultan Hamengkubuwono serves as a hereditary governor and Adipati Paku Alam as a hereditary vice-governor.
- The insurgency in Aceh due to demands for a stricter implementation of Islamic law by the Free Aceh Movement has led to several shifts in political status. Specific autonomy was initially granted to the province through Law no. 24 of 1956. Further autonomy was given through the declaration that Aceh was a "special region" on 23 May 1959, later formalized through Law no. 18 of 1965. Following the fall of Suharto, Law no. 44 of 1999 and Law no. 18 of 2001 created a new framework that was adopted by both parties through Law no. 11 of 2006. This law provides privileged status regarding implementation of Islamic law in religious life, customary life and education for Muslim citizens. Aceh also received its own development fund for a period of 20 years.
- The province of Papua was granted special autonomy through Law no. 21 of 2001. This was a response to independence movements that had been present in the province since it became part of Indonesia, and occurred alongside the renaming of the province from Irian Jaya to Papua. This gave Papua a greater portion of revenue, autonomy outside reserved areas maintained by the central government, and 20 years of a special development fund. Before special autonomy was implemented, West Papua was split from Papua in 2003, although both kept special autonomy. The special autonomy for both provinces was renewed in 2021, including a renewal and increase of the special autonomy fund. Included in this new legislation was the provision to create new provinces, and in July 2022 new national legislation split South Papua, Central Papua, Highland Papua from Papua through Law Number 14 of 2022, Law Number 15 of 2022, and Law Number 16 of 2022 respectively. Law No. 29 of 2022 was enacted in December 2022 splitting Southwest Papua from West Papua. All the split provinces retained their autonomous status.
- The Special Capital Region of Jakarta has its own status, due to it being the country's capital and largest city.

== Geographical units ==
The provinces are officially grouped into seven geographical units for statistical and national planning purposes, but without administrative function.

Regions of Indonesia according to ISO 3166-2:ID ID-SM ID-JW ID-KA ID-NU ID-SL ID-ML ID-PP

| Code | Geographical unit | Provinces | Population (mid-2025) | Projected (mid-2026) | Largest city | Highest point |
|---|---|---|---|---|---|---|
| ID-SM | Sumatra | Aceh, the Bangka Belitung Islands, Bengkulu, Jambi, Lampung, North Sumatra, Riau, the Riau Islands, South Sumatra, and West Sumatra | 62,259,500 | 62,987,200 | Medan | Mount Kerinci; 3,805 m (12484 ft) |
| ID-JW | Java (including Madura) | Banten, Central Java, East Java, the Special Capital Region of Jakarta, the Special Region of Yogyakarta, and West Java | 158,079,100 | 159,194,600 | Jakarta | Mount Semeru; 3,678 m (12067 ft) |
| ID-KA | Kalimantan | Central Kalimantan, East Kalimantan, North Kalimantan, South Kalimantan, and West Kalimantan | 17,951,300 | 18,323,800 | Samarinda | Mount Bukit Raya; 2,278 m (7,474 ft) |
| ID-NU | Nusa Tenggara (Lesser Sunda Islands) | Bali, West Nusa Tenggara, and East Nusa Tenggara | 15,935,000 | 16,132,100 | Denpasar | Mount Rinjani; 3,726 m (12,224 ft) |
| ID-SL | Sulawesi | Central Sulawesi, Gorontalo, North Sulawesi, South Sulawesi, Southeast Sulawesi, and West Sulawesi | 21,044,800 | 21,275,400 | Makassar | Latimojong; 3,478 m (11,411 ft) |
| ID-ML | Maluku Islands | Maluku and North Maluku | 3,344,200 | 3,386,900 | Ambon | Mount Binaiya; 3,027 m (9,931 ft) |
| ID-PP | Papua (Western New Guinea) | Central Papua, Highland Papua, Papua, South Papua, Southwest Papua, and West Papua | 5,824,500 | 5,898,400 | Jayapura | Puncak Jaya; 4,884 m (16,024 ft) |

== Former provinces ==
Evolution of Indonesia's provinces from 1945 until North Kalimantan's establishment in 2012

Three-province Sumatra (1948–56) (L) and two-province Sulawesi (1960–64) with present-day regency borders

Upon the independence of Indonesia, eight provinces were established. West Java, Central Java, East Java, and Maluku still exist as of today despite later divisions, while Sumatra, Kalimantan, Sulawesi, and Nusa Tenggara, formerly Lesser Sunda (Sunda Kecil) were fully liquidated by dividing them into new provinces. The province of Central Sumatra existed from 1948 to 1957, while East Timor was annexed as a province from 1976 until its power transfer to UNTAET in 1999 prior to its independence as a country in 2002.

| Province | Capital | Period | Successor(s) |
|---|---|---|---|
| Special Region of Surakarta (Daerah Istimewa Surakarta) | Surakarta | 1945–1946 | Central Java |
| Sumatra | Bukittinggi / Medan | 1945–1948 | Central Sumatra; North Sumatra; South Sumatra |
| Kalimantan | Banjarmasin | 1945–1956 | East Kalimantan; South Kalimantan; West Kalimantan |
| Nusa Tenggara | Singaraja | 1945–1958 | Bali; East Nusa Tenggara; West Nusa Tenggara |
| Sulawesi | Makassar / Manado | 1945–1960 | North-Central Sulawesi; South-Southeast Sulawesi |
| Central Sumatra (Sumatera Tengah) | Bukittinggi | 1948–1957 | Jambi; Riau; West Sumatra |
| North-Central Sulawesi (Sulawesi Utara-Tengah) | Manado | 1960–1964 | North Sulawesi; Central Sulawesi |
| South-Southeast Sulawesi (Sulawesi Selatan-Tenggara) | Makassar | 1960–1964 | South Sulawesi; Southeast Sulawesi |
| East Timor (Timor Timur) | Dili | 1976–1999 | Democratic Republic of Timor-Leste |

== New provinces made from currently-existing provinces ==
Pre-1999 Maluku (L) and Irian Jaya (now Papua, R) with present-day regency borders

Provinces in Western New Guinea, after the split of Papua Province into four provinces in June 2022 and after the split of West Papua Province into two provinces in December 2022

| New province (current name) | Year | New province (original name) | Province of origin |
|---|---|---|---|
| Special Region of Yogyakarta | 1950 | Yogyakarta | Central Java |
| Aceh | 1956 | Aceh | North Sumatra |
| Central Kalimantan | 1958 | Central Kalimantan | South Kalimantan |
| Jakarta Special Capital Region | 1959 | Greater Jakarta | West Java |
| Lampung | 1964 | Lampung | South Sumatra |
| Bengkulu | 1967 | Bengkulu | South Sumatra |
| North Maluku | 1999 | North Maluku | Maluku |
| Banten | 2000 | Banten | West Java |
| Bangka Belitung Islands | 2000 | Bangka Belitung Islands | South Sumatra |
| Gorontalo | 2000 | Gorontalo | North Sulawesi |
| Riau Islands | 2002 | Riau Islands | Riau |
| West Papua | 2003 | West Irian Jaya | Irian Jaya |
| West Sulawesi | 2004 | West Sulawesi | South Sulawesi |
| North Kalimantan | 2012 | North Kalimantan | East Kalimantan |
| Central Papua | 2022 | Central Papua | Papua |
| Highland Papua | 2022 | Highland Papua | Papua |
| South Papua | 2022 | South Papua | Papua |
| Southwest Papua | 2022 | Southwest Papua | West Papua |

== Renamed provinces ==
| Year | Old name (Indonesian) | Old name (English) | New name (Indonesian) | New name (English) | Current name |
|---|---|---|---|---|---|
| 1954 | Sunda Kecil | Lesser Sunda | Nusa Tenggara | Nusa Tenggara | none |
| 1959 | Aceh | Aceh | Daerah Istimewa Aceh | Aceh Special Region | Aceh |
| 1961 | Jakarta Raya | Greater Jakarta | Daerah Khusus Ibukota Jakarta Raya | Greater Jakarta Special Capital Region | Jakarta Special Capital Region |
| 1973 | Irian Barat | West Irian | Irian Jaya | Irian Jaya | Papua |
| 1990 | Daerah Khusus Ibukota Jakarta Raya | Greater Jakarta Special Capital Region | Daerah Khusus Ibukota Jakarta | Jakarta Special Capital Region | Jakarta Special Capital Region |
| 2001 | Daerah Istimewa Aceh | Aceh Special Region | Nanggroë Aceh Darussalam | State of Aceh, the Abode of Peace | Aceh |
| 2002 | Irian Jaya | Irian Jaya | Papua | Papua | Papua |
| 2007 | Irian Jaya Barat | West Irian Jaya | Papua Barat | West Papua | West Papua |
| 2009 | Nanggroë Aceh Darussalam | State of Aceh, the Abode of Peace | Aceh | Aceh | Aceh |

== Former provincial capitals ==
- Tanjungpinang to Pekanbaru, Riau (until 1959)
- Jakarta to Bandung, West Java (until 1960)
- Singaraja to Denpasar, Bali (until 1960)
- Soasio to Sukarnopura, West Irian (1956–1963)
- Dili, East Timor (1975–1999), later became the capital of Democratic Republic of Timor-Leste
- Ternate to Sofifi, North Maluku (until 2010)
- Banjarmasin to Banjarbaru, South Kalimantan (until 2022)

== See also ==
- List of regencies and cities of Indonesia
- Subdivisions of Indonesia
