= Suishintai =

1944 Indonesian paramilitary youth corps

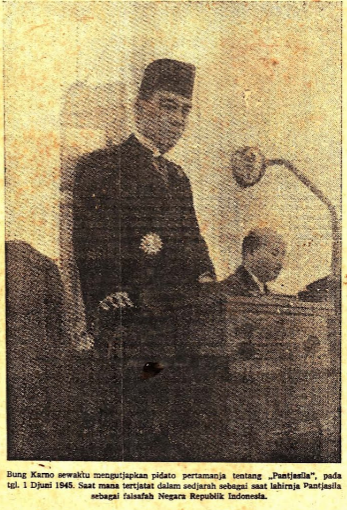
Sukarno gives a speech on Pancasila, one of the first to be heard by the Barisan Banteng, 1 June 1945.

The Suishintai (Japanese: 推進体, romanized: Suishintai, lit. 'Pioneer Corps', Indonesian: Barisan Pelopor) was the paramilitary youth wing of the Jawa Hōkōkai (ジャワ奉公会, "Javanese Service Society") which was formed in the Dutch East Indies (now Indonesia) under Japanese occupation in August 1944 by its leader Sukarno, alongside Soediro, Moewardi, Soeroso, Oto Iskandar di Nata, and Boentaran Martoatmodjo. Members of the Suishintai did not wear a special uniform like military units, instead wearing a badge of a bull's head in a circle that was attached to the left side of the chest. At the end of 1945, this so-called lascar had approximately 60,000 youth members, a number that could only be matched and beaten by the socialist Pesindo, the Barisan Hizbullah of the Masyumi Party, and the Lasjkar Rakjat of the Murba Party. Following the Proclamation of Indonesian Independence, the Suishintai was renamed to Barisan Banteng ("Bulls Front"). The corps was mobilized to hear speeches from nationalist leaders. In addition, they were trained in the mobilization of large crowds, strengthening of military defenses, and in carrying out activities for the well-being of the people.

== Formation ==
In mid-1944, a session of the Central Advisory Council (Japanese: 中央参議院, romanized: Chūō Sangiin, Indonesian: Dewan Pertimbangan Pusat) took place. One of the decisions taken was to formulate a way to foster Indonesian nationalism and strengthen society to prevent direct or indirect attacks from the enemy. On this basis, the Empire of Japan ordered the formation of the Suishintai. Because at that time Indonesia was officially still the Dutch East Indies under Japanese occupation, this new organization supported the Japanese war effort against the Allies under the pretext of defending Indonesian society. The corps thrived in urban areas. Its main activity was the military training of its members with simple tools, such as wooden rifles (mokujū) and bamboo spears. Membership of the Suishintai was heterogeneous and consisted of various youth groups; the educated, the under-educated, and those without any education. From this system, it was hoped that solidarity furthered the unity and integrity of the corps.

== See also ==
- Central Advisory Council
- Collaboration with the Empire of Japan
- Indonesian National Revolution
- Japanese occupation of the Dutch East Indies
