= Nagasaki-e =

Japanese genre of woodblock prints

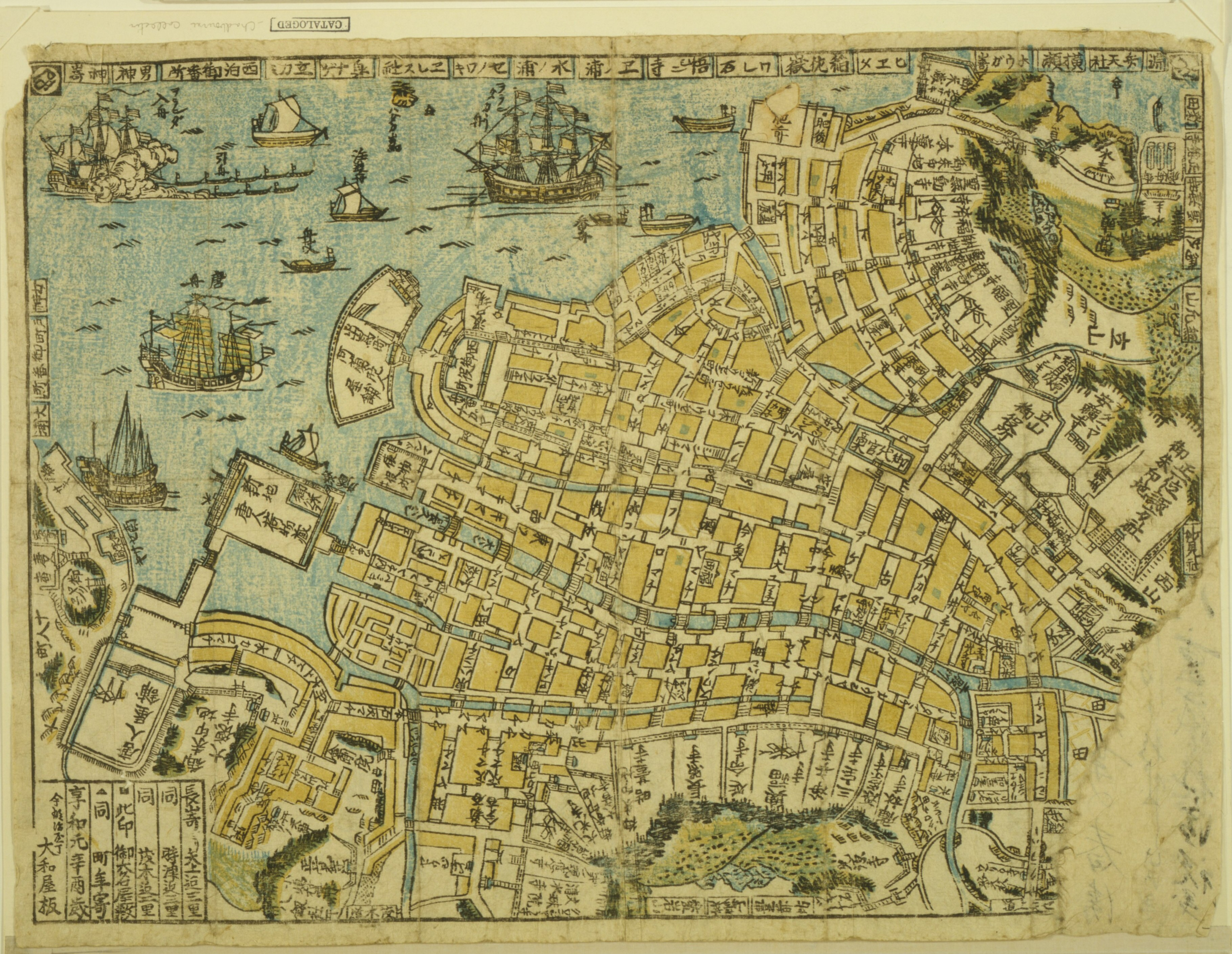
Anonymous: Map of Nagasaki, 1821 (published by Bunkindô)

Nagasaki-e (Japanese: 長崎絵) is a genre of ukiyo-e woodblock prints, produced in Nagasaki during the Edo period, that depict the port city of Nagasaki, the Dutch and Chinese who frequented it, and other foreign curiosities such as exotic fauna and Dutch and Chinese ships. They were mostly produced for merchants who traveled to Japan on business. Japanese people also bought such prints as they were curious about foreigners, with whom they couldn't meet themselves. Nagasaki-e print were also sold in Edo, Osaka, and provinces. Nagasaki was the only port that foreigners were allowed to visit in Tokugawa time, between 1641 and 1859.

Technically, Nagasaki-e print were made on paper of inferior quality, with "earlier examples were made with gasenshi, a Chinese-style paper containing tan tree fibers (Pteroceltis tatarinowii maxim), rice-straw, and bleached bamboo. Sometimes, printers rubbed the colorants into the papers with horizontal or vertical strokes rather than the traditional circular motions used in nishiki-e." The first nagasaki-e prints were made in the late 1720s. "The range of subject matter was wide, including foreign couples, children, families, pets, exotic birds and animals, female beauties, courtesans, landscapes, cityscapes, ships, maps, and military events." Style was similar to that of Chinese nenga (年画).

Production of these souvenir prints "grew out of an earlier map-making industry". Several publishing houses produced the prints, among them Hariya (針屋), Toshimaya (豊島屋), Yamatoya (大和屋), and Bunkindō (文錦堂). For most publishers nagasaki-e wasn't their main business. One of the first examples of nagasaki-e prints were panoramic maps of the city, that were very popular and were printed for many years without any change.

Most prints are anonymous, probably because the majority of authors were amateurs "who worked in foreign-trade positions in Nagasaki". One of the best-known authors is Kawahara Keiga, who had access to many Dutch paintings with the help of Franz von Siebold, who worked for the Dutch government at the Nagasaki port.

== Gallery ==
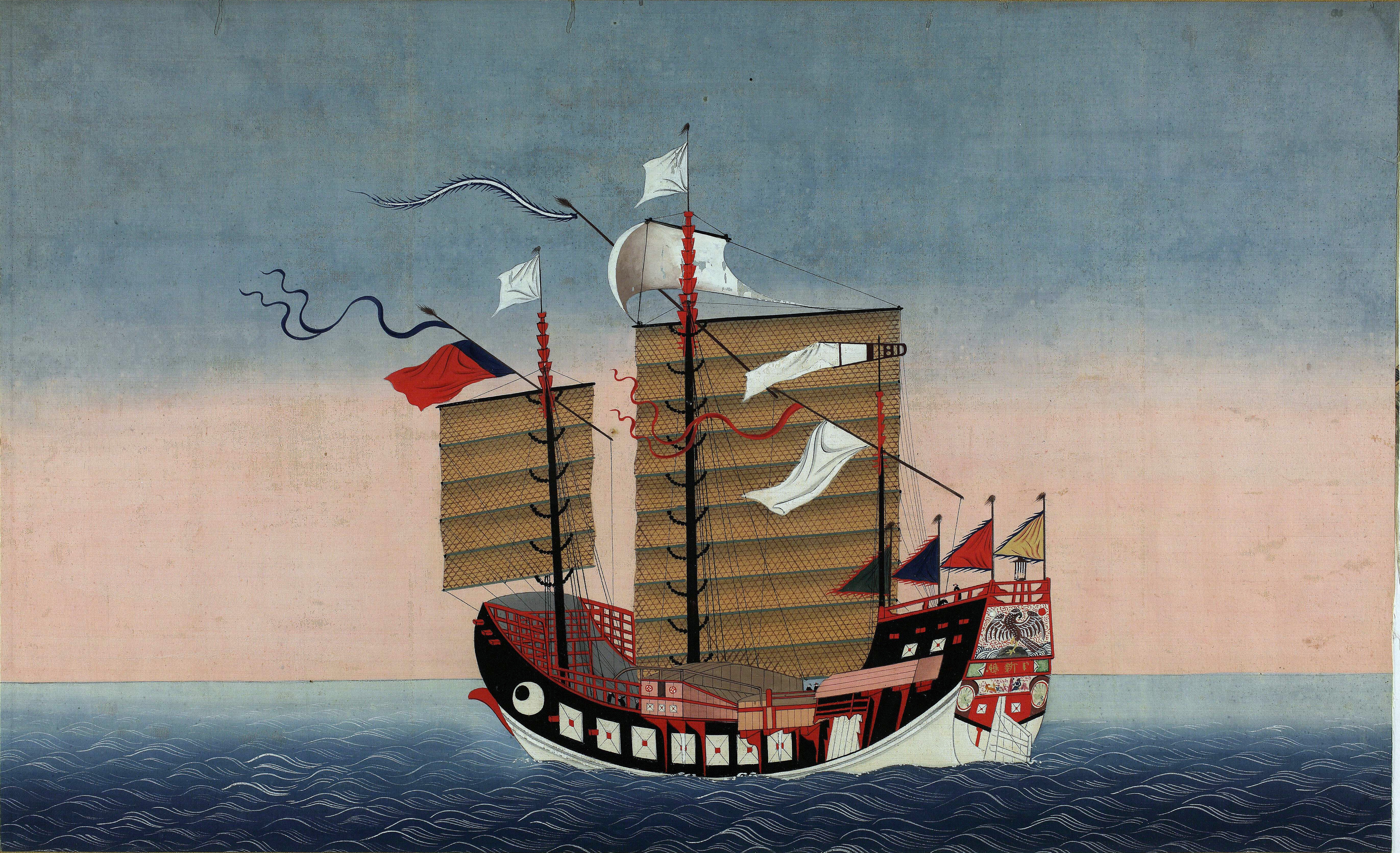
Painting of one of the Chinese ships that visited Nagasaki, attributed to Kawahara Keiga

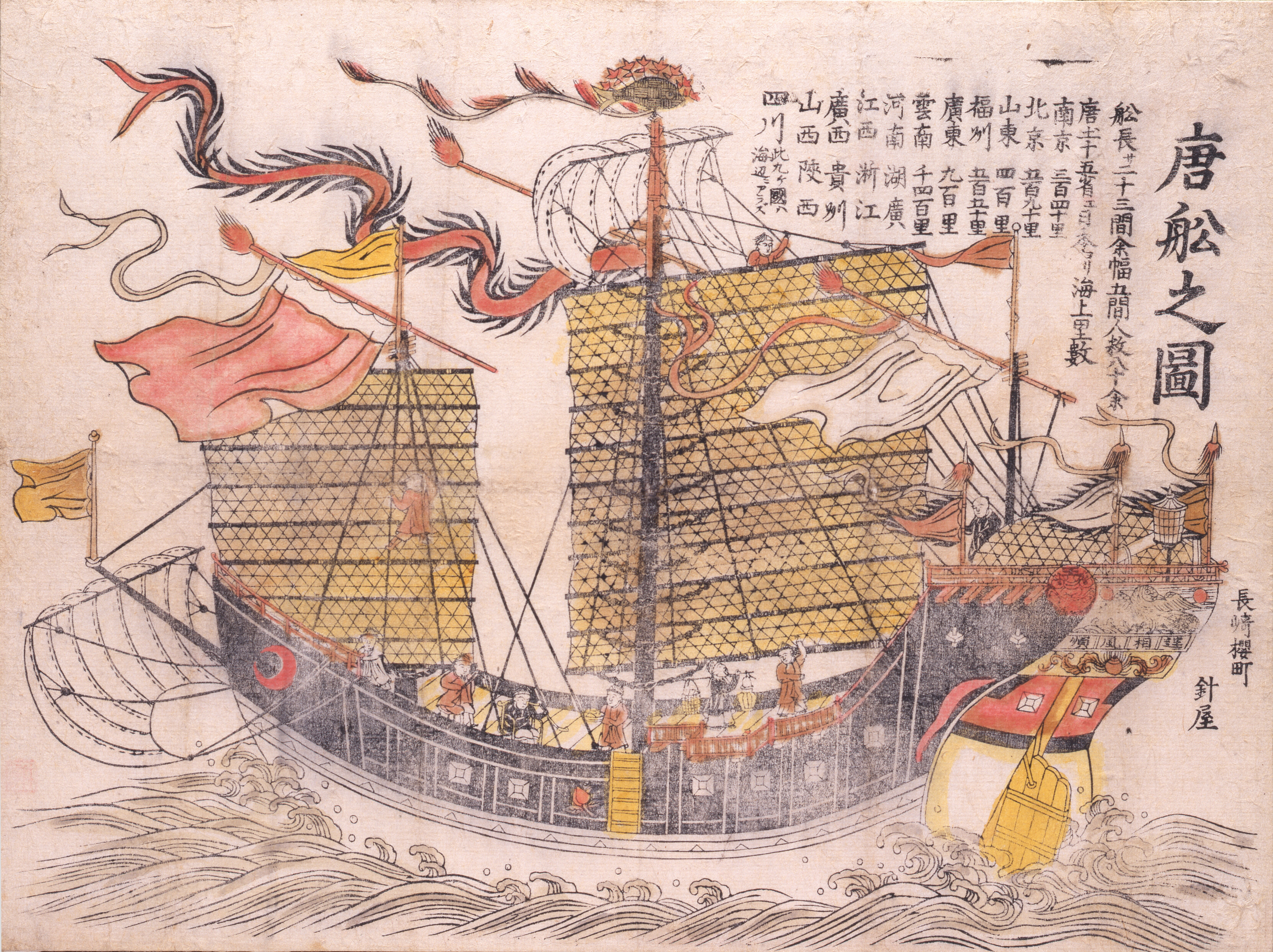
Picture of a Chinese Ship (唐舩之図)

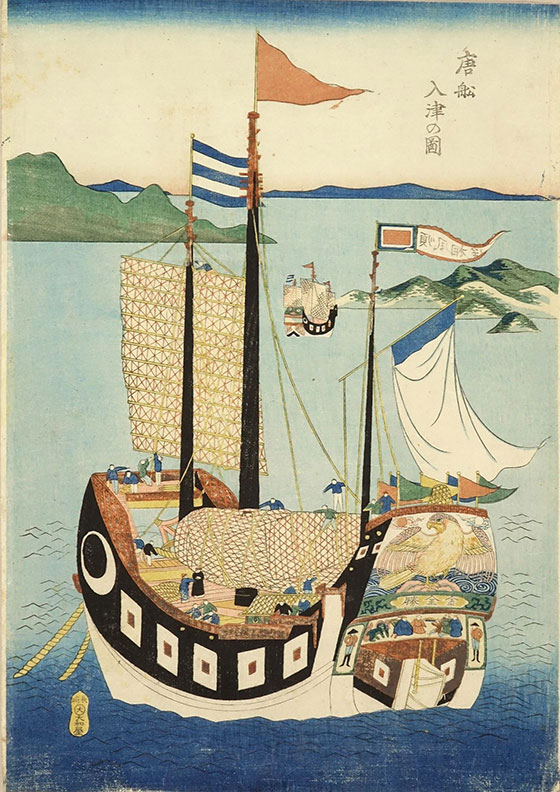
Anonymous: Chinese ship entering Nagasaki harbor, nishiki-e, c. 1840s

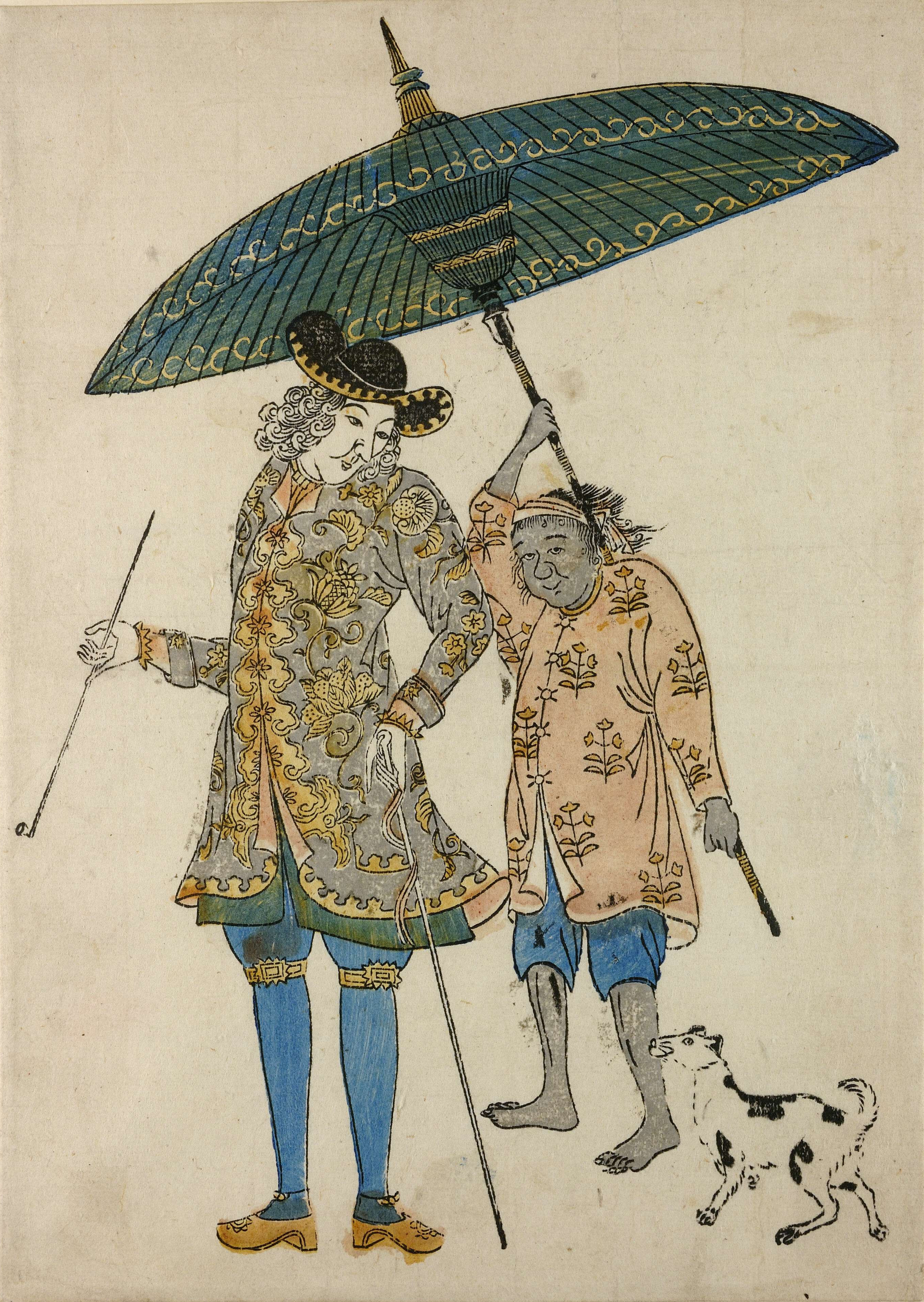
Nagasaki print of a Dutchman with his Javanese manservant and a dog, c. last quarter 18th century

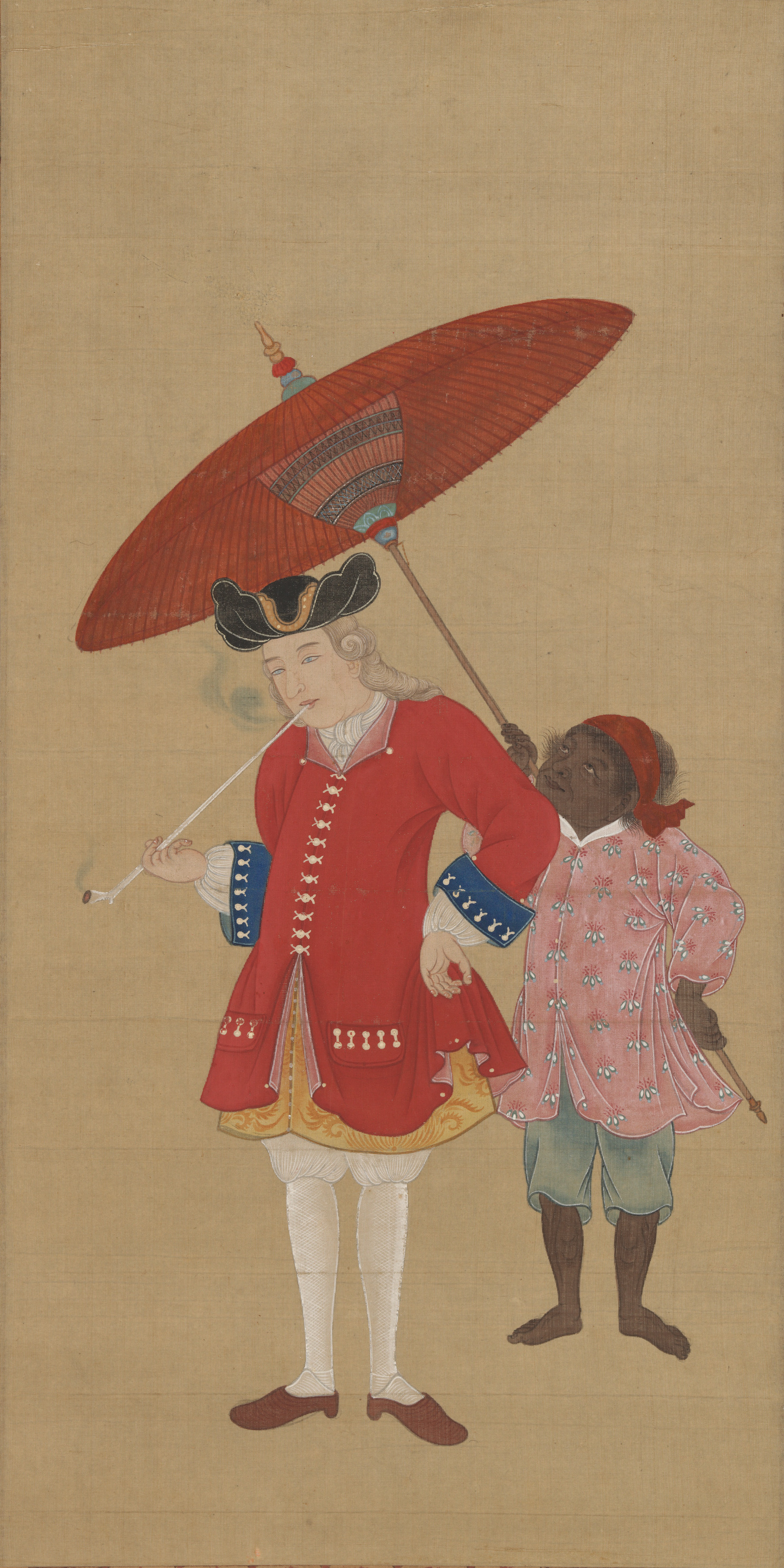
Painting of a Dutchman with his Javanese servant, attributed to Kawahara Keiga

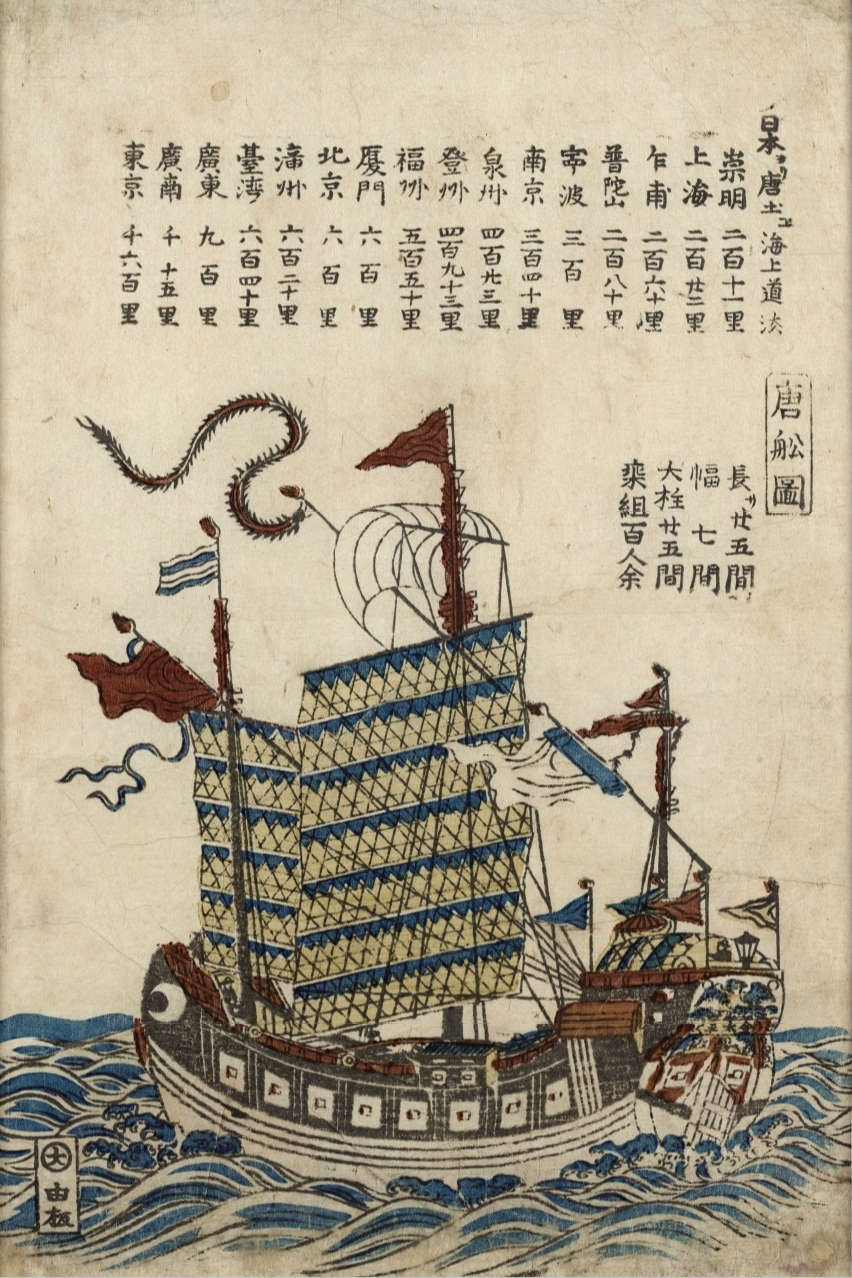
Nagasaki print of a Chinese ship, c. 1820

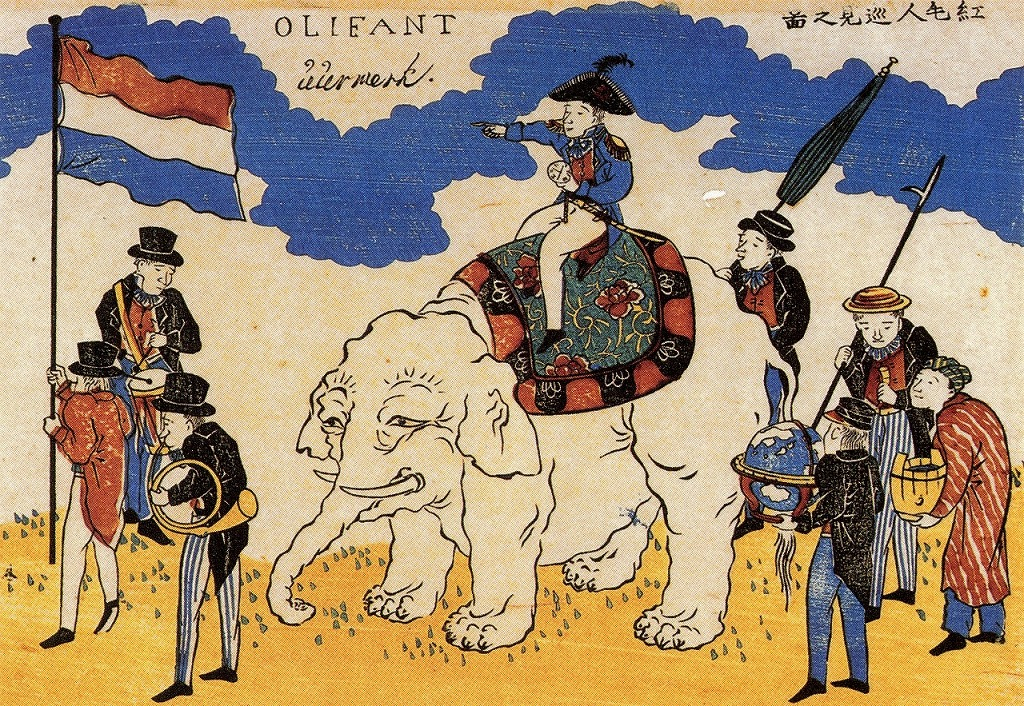
Dutch with elephant at Nagasaki, c. before 1868

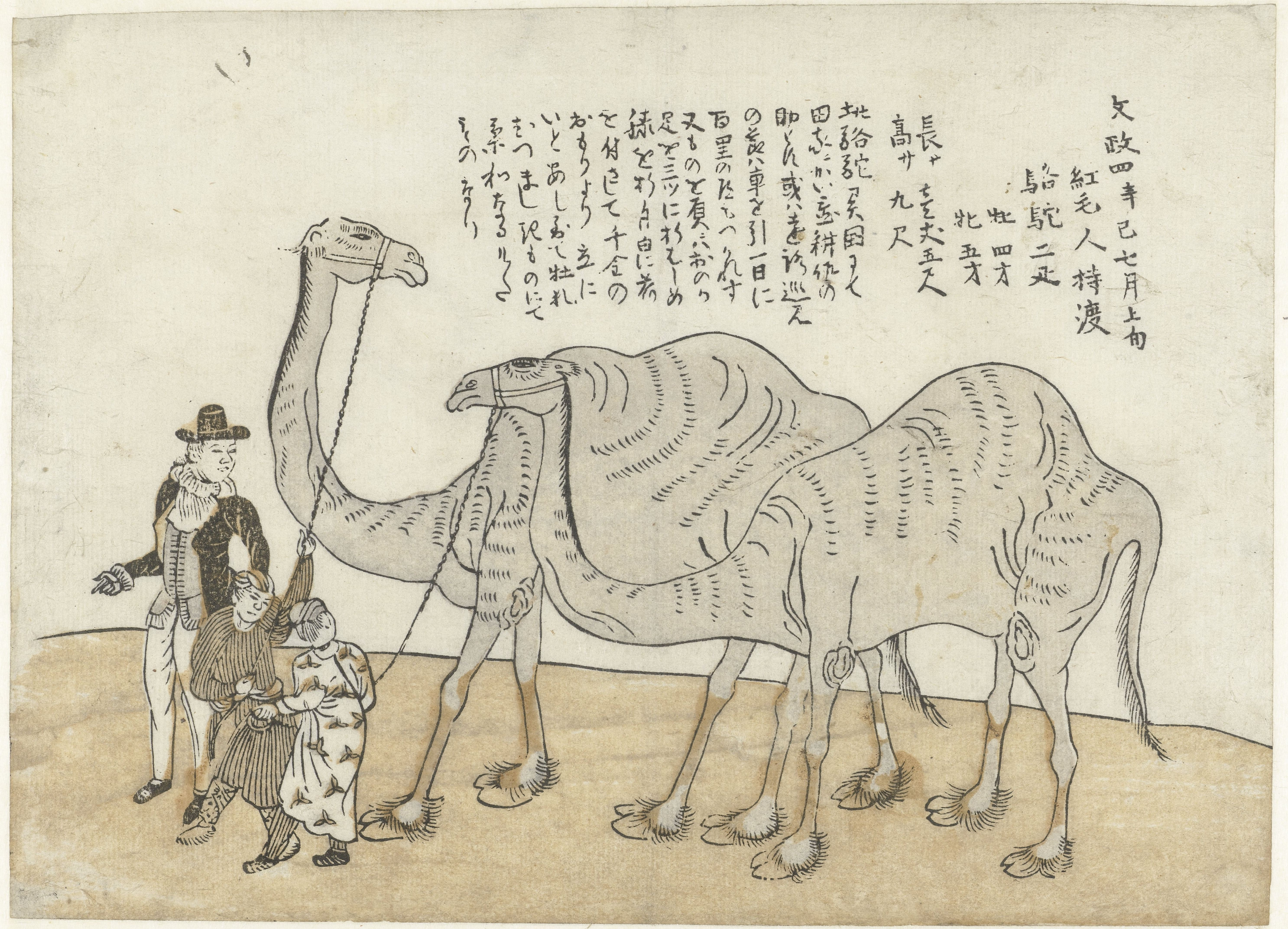
c. 1821

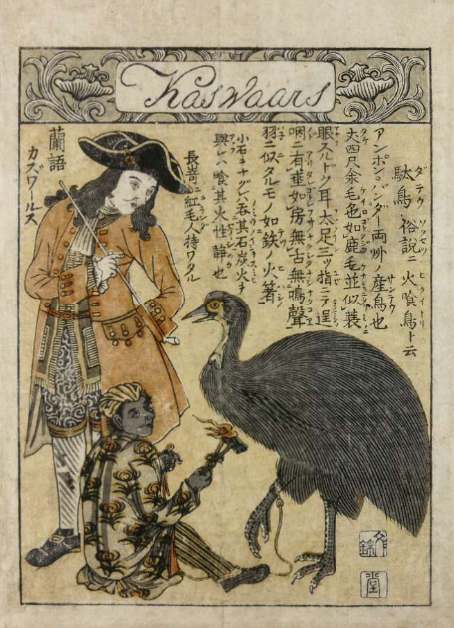
Inscription reads: Kaswaars dacho zokusetsu ni hi-kui tori to iu. Casuarius casuarius was thought to fire from mouth. A Dutch man with a boy servant and an ostrich. 1800s

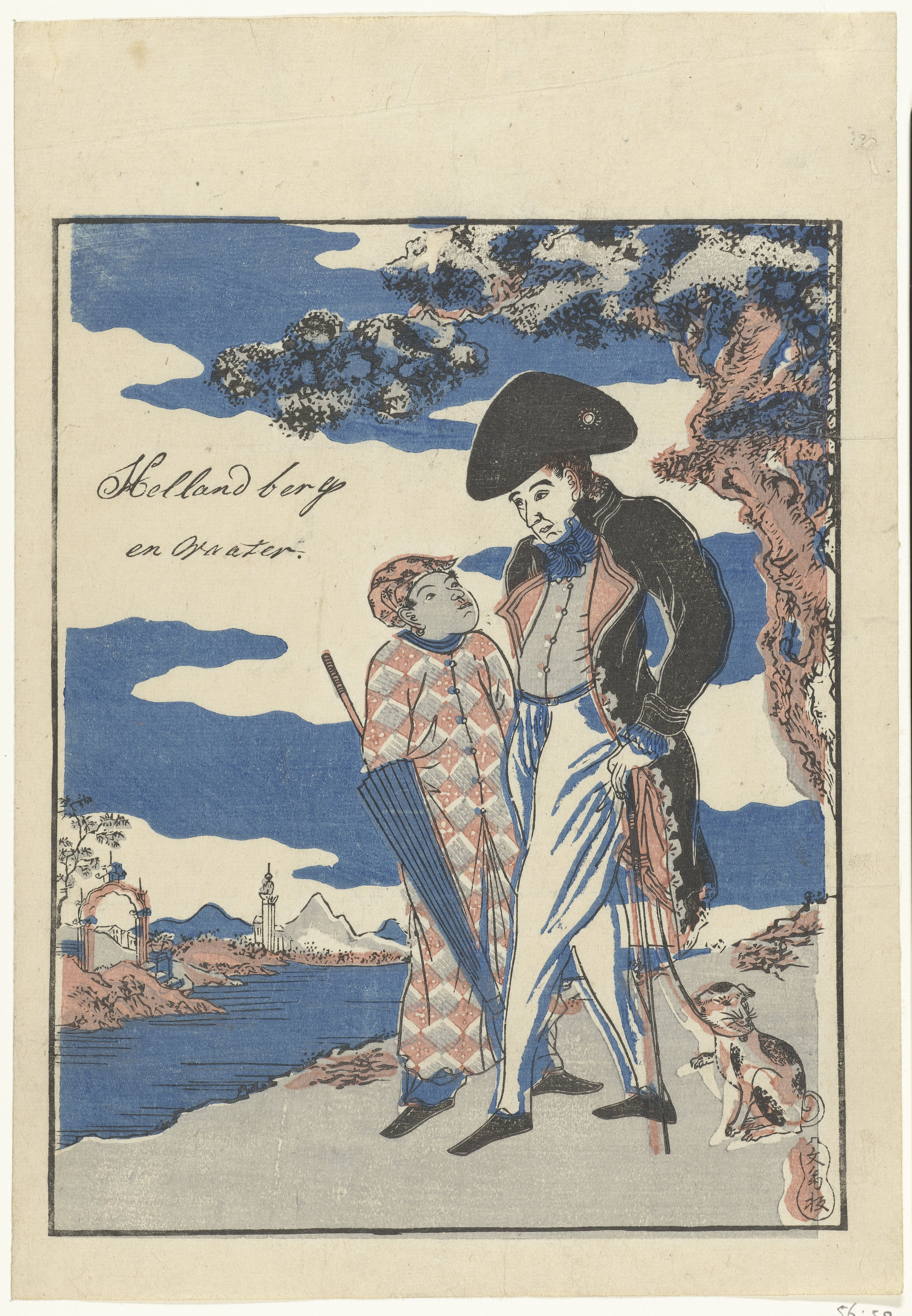
Dutch chief with Javanese servant

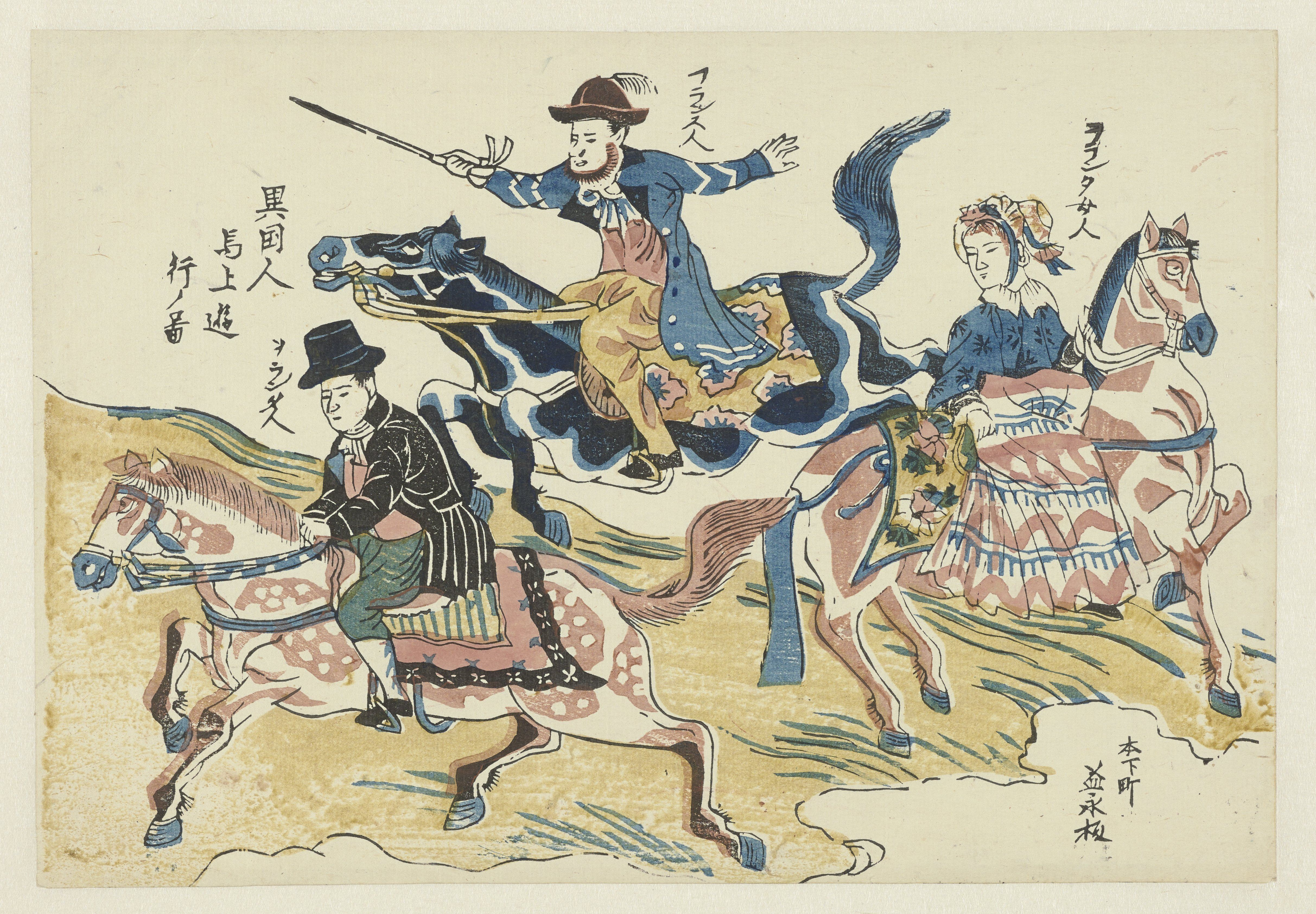
Anonymous print
