= Hariya (Nagasaki publishing house) =

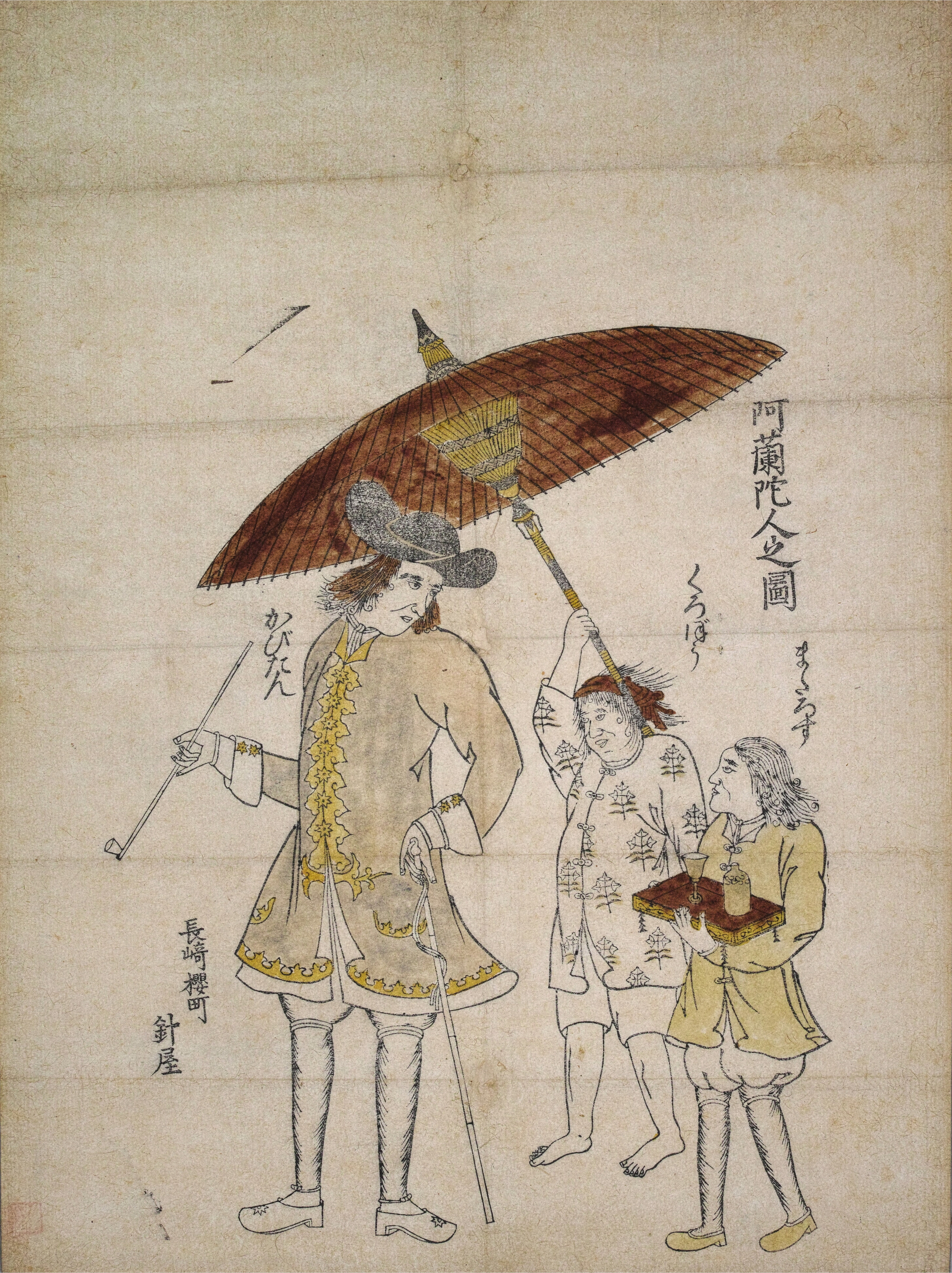
Picture of a Hollander (阿蘭陀人之図), woodblock print 43.5 centimetres (17.1 in) by 32.4 centimetres (12.8 in) (Kobe City Museum)

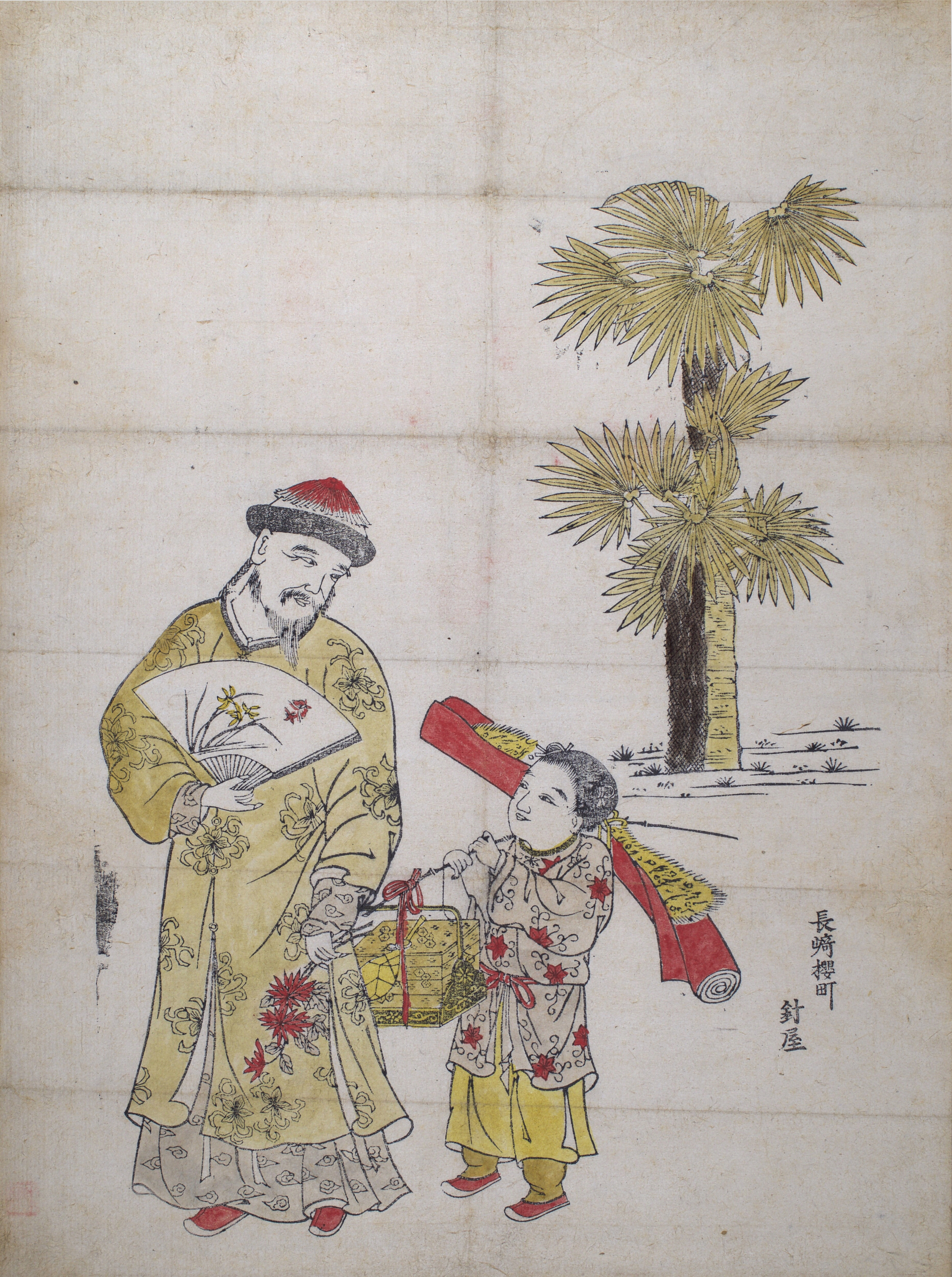
Untitled, but identifiable as a Chinaman, woodblock print 43.5 centimetres (17.1 in) by 32.3 centimetres (12.7 in) (Kobe City Museum)

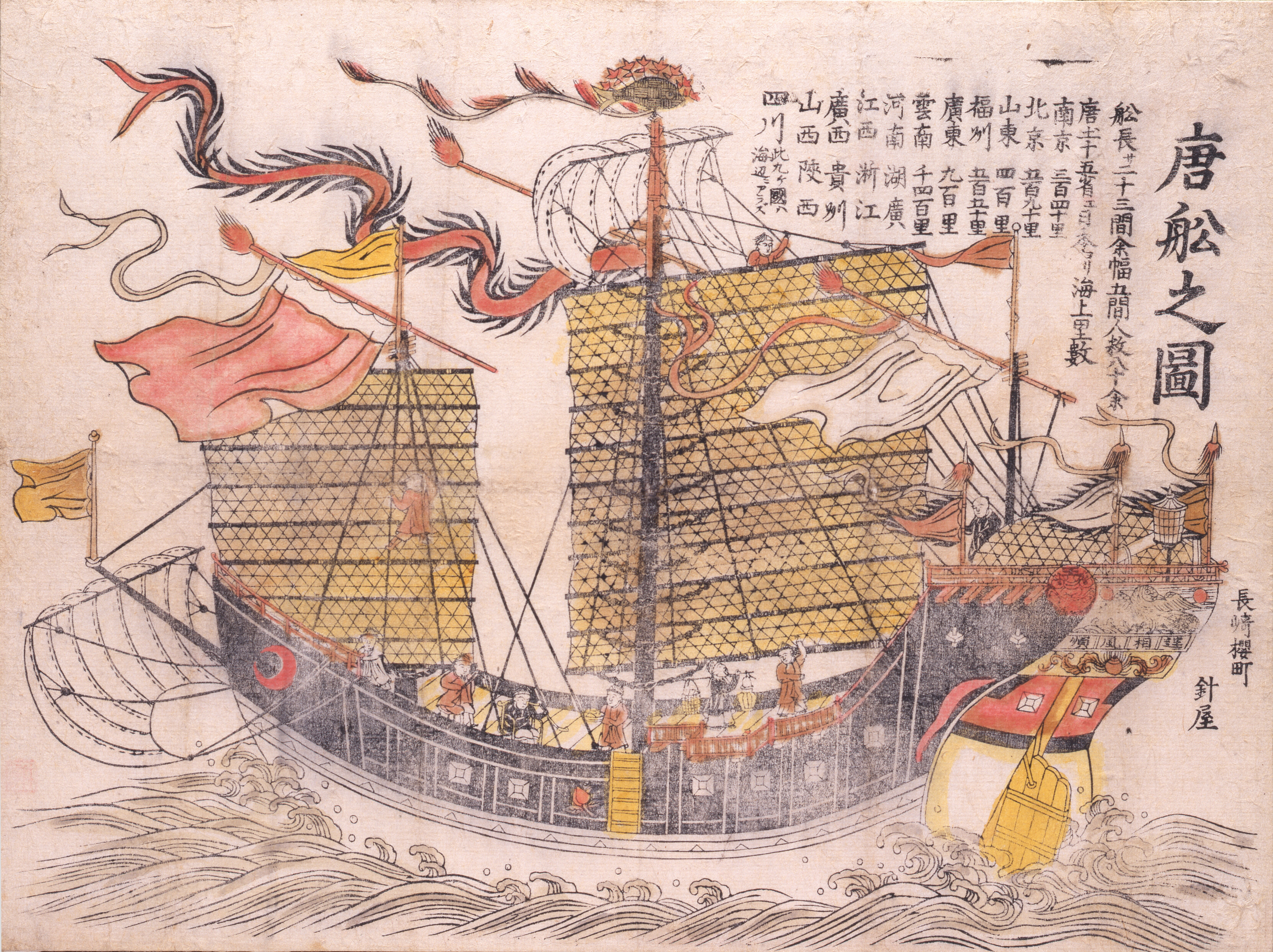
Picture of a Chinese Ship (唐舩之図), woodblock print 32.4 centimetres (12.8 in) by 43.5 centimetres (17.1 in) (Kobe City Museum)

Hariya (針屋) was one of the four main Edo period publishing houses of the Nagasaki prints (長崎版画, Nagasaki hanga), also known as Nagasaki-e (長崎絵), that depict the port city of Nagasaki, the Dutch and Chinese who frequented it, and other foreign curiosities such as exotic fauna and Dutch and Chinese ships. Hariya was the first of the four leading houses; the others were Toshimaya (豊島屋), Yamatoya (大和屋), and Bunkindō (文錦堂). Three different prints are known from Hariya, with subject matter that relates to the Dutch residents of Dejima and to Tōjin yashiki, the city's so-called "Chinese factory".

== Name ==
Hariya as fariya is included as an entry in the 1604 supplement to the Nippo Jisho, the Japanese-Portuguese dictionary compiled by Jesuit missionaries and published in Nagasaki in 1603 (the first dictionary of Japanese to a European language). There it is defined as "that which makes needles for sewing, also, the store or establishment where these are sold". (Note: "Fariya. O que faz agulhas de coser. ¶ Itē, Tenda, ou casa onde se vendem." (The definition is to be found in the 1604 supplement.)) The word hariya also features in Saikaku's 1688 ukiyo-zōshi The Eternal Storehouse of Japan (日本永代蔵, Nippon Eitaigura), as a byword for travel: "it's when you can slip in talk of needle shops (hariya) and ink brushes that you're really attuned to the mindset of someone used to life on the road". (Note: 「随分道中の人になれたる心の、針屋・筆やかたられて」(II.3)) One Hariya Yohee (針屋与兵衛) appears in the records of Nagasaki temple Daion-ji (大音寺); his death in Hōreki 4 (1754) would make him a plausible candidate, since the known prints are understood to date from the years to 1750.

== Surviving prints ==
Three different prints are known. In all three the publisher is given as Hariya (針屋) of Nagasaki Sakura-machi (長崎櫻町). When C. R. Boxer was writing, the Hollander was unique, with two prints of each of the other two known. A set of all three may now be found at Kobe City Museum although, judging from the similar later issues by other houses based on these the earliest prints, there may originally have been also a fourth, of a Dutch ship. The prints are hand-coloured, using a brush and red, yellow, brown, and blue pigments, over the printed ink sumi-zuri.

=== Picture of a Dutchman ===
Entitled Picture of a Dutchman (阿蘭陀人之図, Oranda-jin no zu), the print shows a red-haired Dutch man with a long clay smoking pipe (cf. kiseru) and a walking cane, accompanied by a Javanese servant with a Japanese-style umbrella, and a sailor carrying a tray with a flask and a goblet, perhaps for wine. C. R. Boxer identifies "Asiatic influence" in the man's coat, suggesting local or Chinese tailoring. Additional lettering identifies the figures: the Dutch Opperhoofd or Captain (かびたん, kabitan), his "black boy" (くろぼう, kurobō), and a sailor またろす (matarosu).

=== Chinaman ===
Without a title, the print goes by the name of Chinaman of the Great Qing (大清人, Dai-Shin-jin).

=== Picture of a Chinese Ship ===
Entitled Picture of a Chinese ship (唐舩之図, Tōsen no zu), the print shows the vessel and nine of her crew, accompanied by thirteen lines of text with details as to the ship's size and complement and distances from Japan to locations in China. (Note: "Ship's length: in excess of 23 ken; width: 5 ken; number of people: over 80 number of ri over the sea from Japan to fifteen provinces in China: Nanjing 340 ri Beijing 590 ri Shandong 400 ri Fuzhou 550 ri Guangdong 900 ri Yunnan 1,400 ri Henan Huguang Jiangxi Zhejiang Guangxi Guizhou Shanxi Shaanxi Sichuan—these nine provinces are not on the seaboard" 舩長サ二十三間余幅五間人数八十余 唐𡈽十五省エ日本ヨリ海上里𢿙 南京 三百四十里 北京 五百九十里 山東 四百里 福州 五百五十里 廣東 九百里 雲南 千四百里 河南 湖廣 江西 浙江 廣西 貴州 山西 陝西 四川 此九ヶ國ハ海辺ニアラズ)

== Related paintings and prints ==
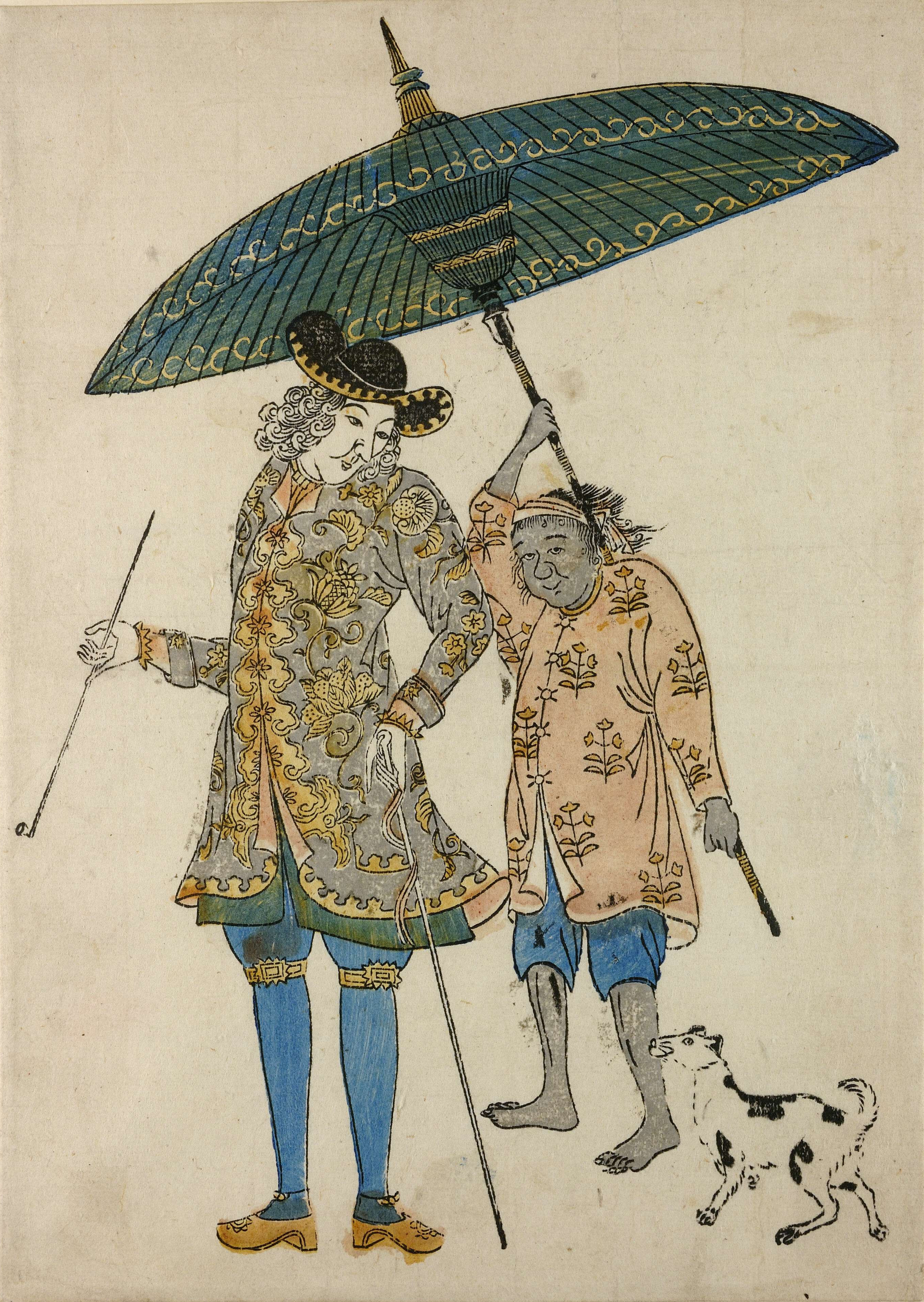
Nagasaki print of a Dutchman with his Javanese manservant and a dog, late C18 (British Museum)

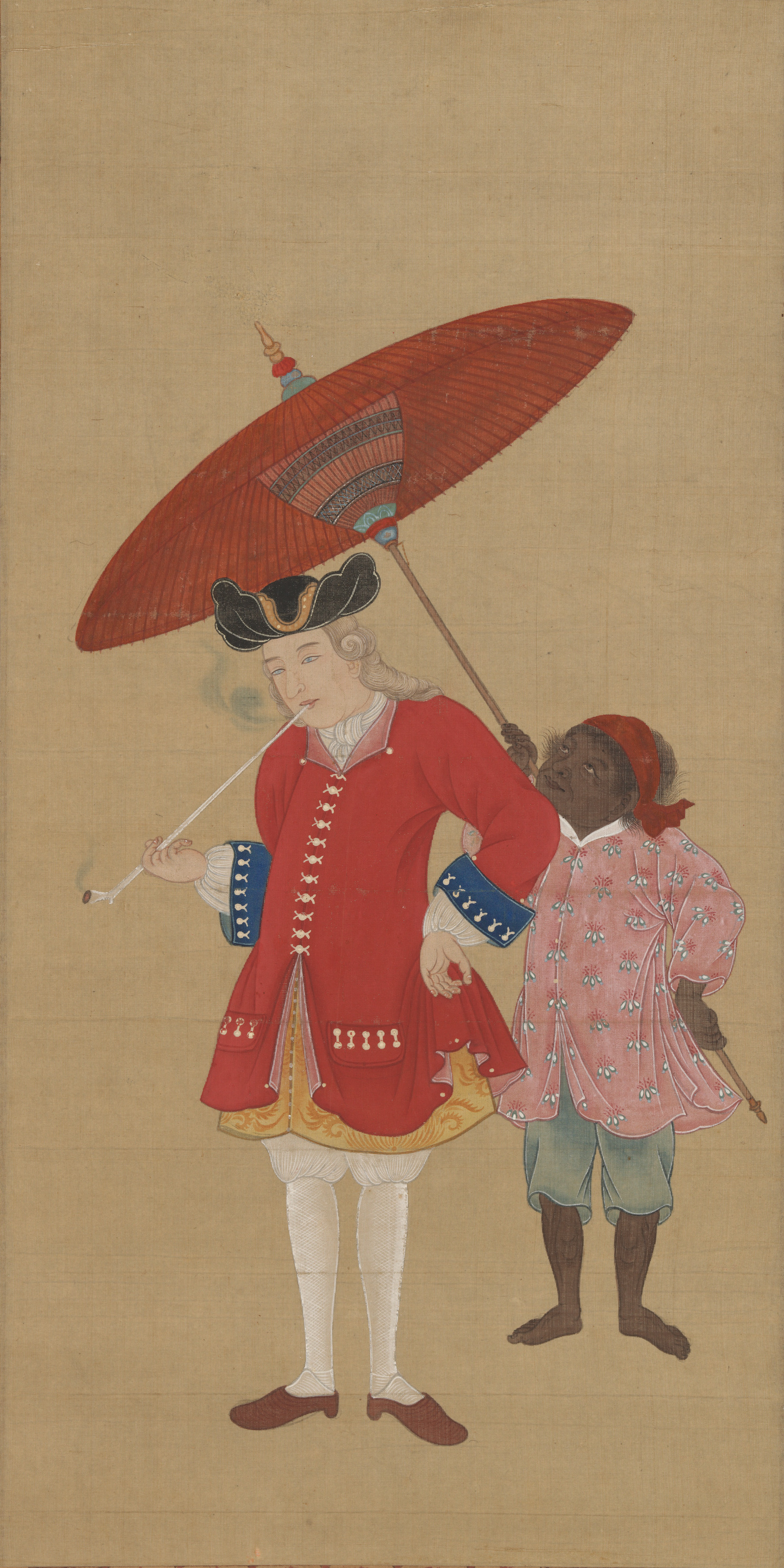
Painting of a Dutchman with his Javanese servant, attributed to Kawahara Keiga (early C19) (Metropolitan Museum of Art)

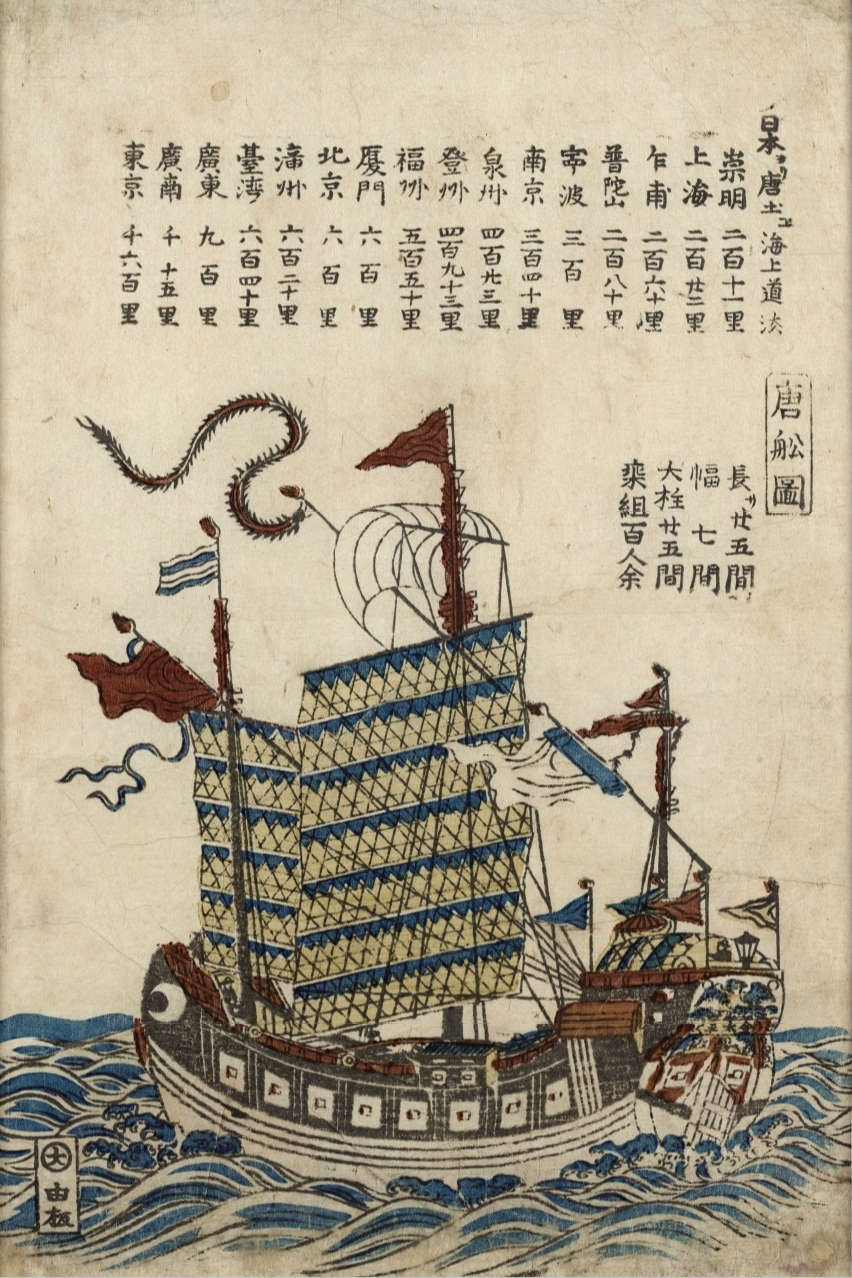
Nagasaki print of a Chinese ship, c. 1820 (Hong Kong Maritime Museum)

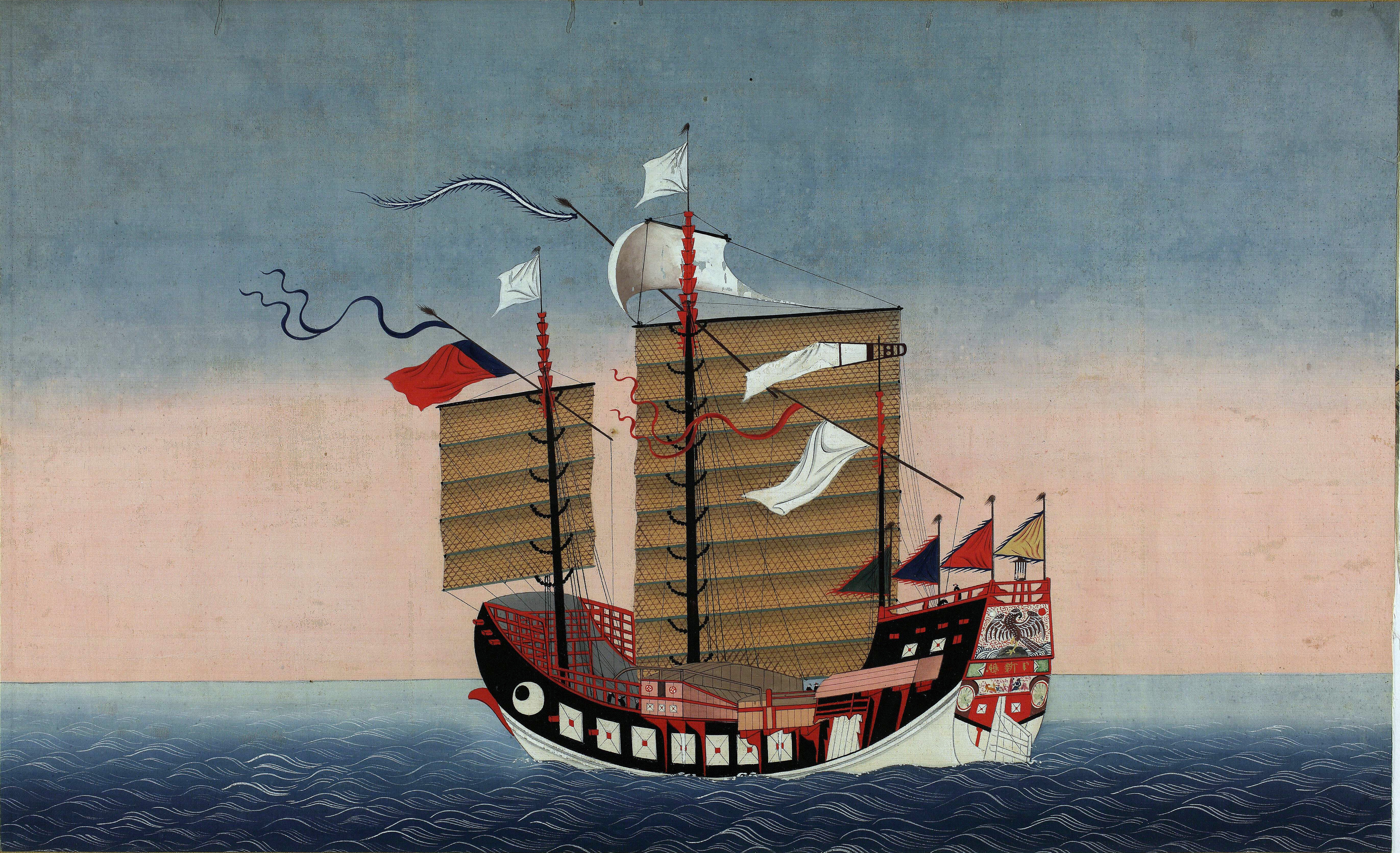
Painting of one of the Chinese ships that visited Nagasaki, attributed to Kawahara Keiga (C19) (British Museum)

== See also ==
- Woodblock printing in Japan
- Dutch East India Company
- Akita ranga
- Red seal ships
- Jagatara-bumi
