= Surakarta =

City in Central Java, Indonesia

Surakarta Solo
- City
- City of Surakarta; Kota Surakarta

Regional transcription(s)
  - Javanese: ꦯꦸꦫꦏꦂꦠ
  - Pegon: سوراكارتا
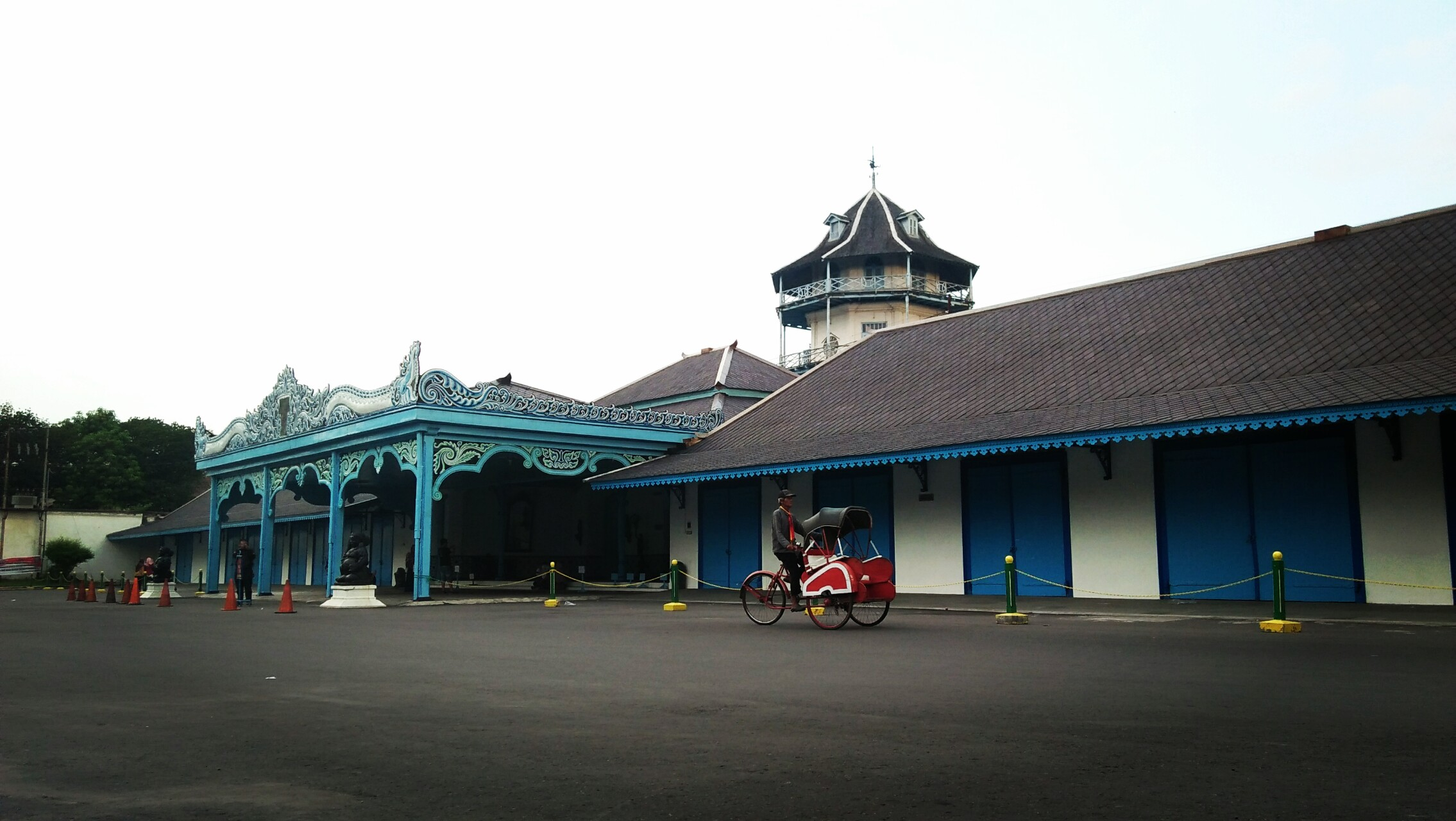
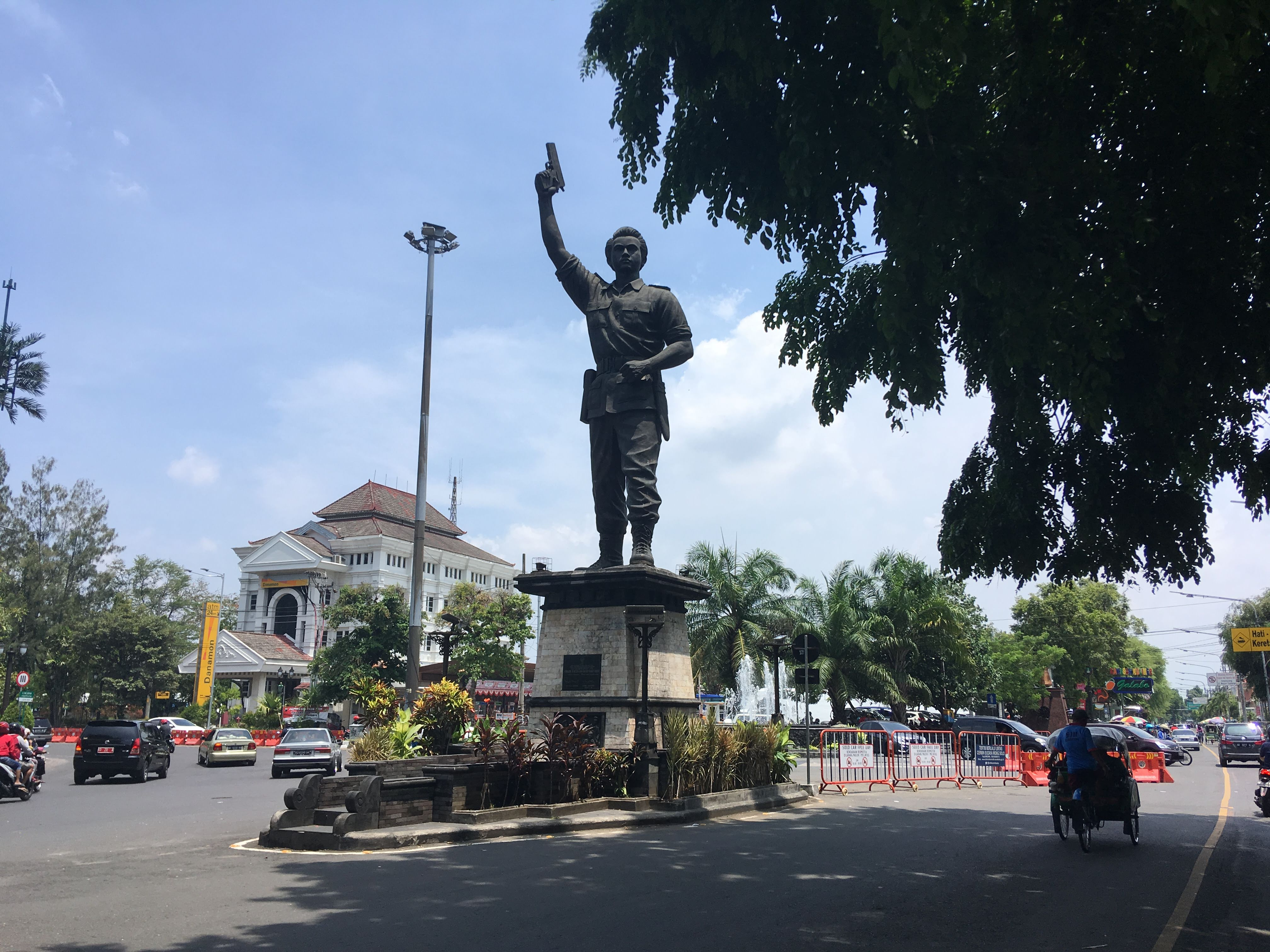
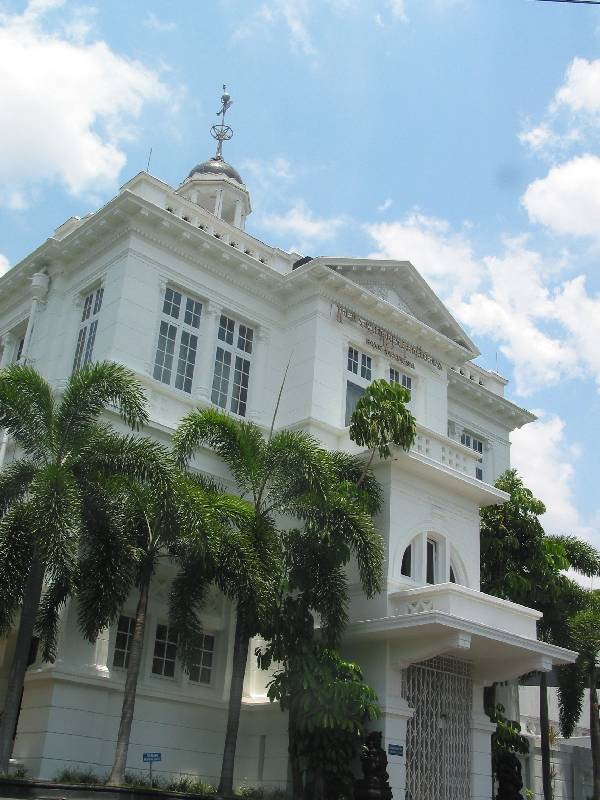
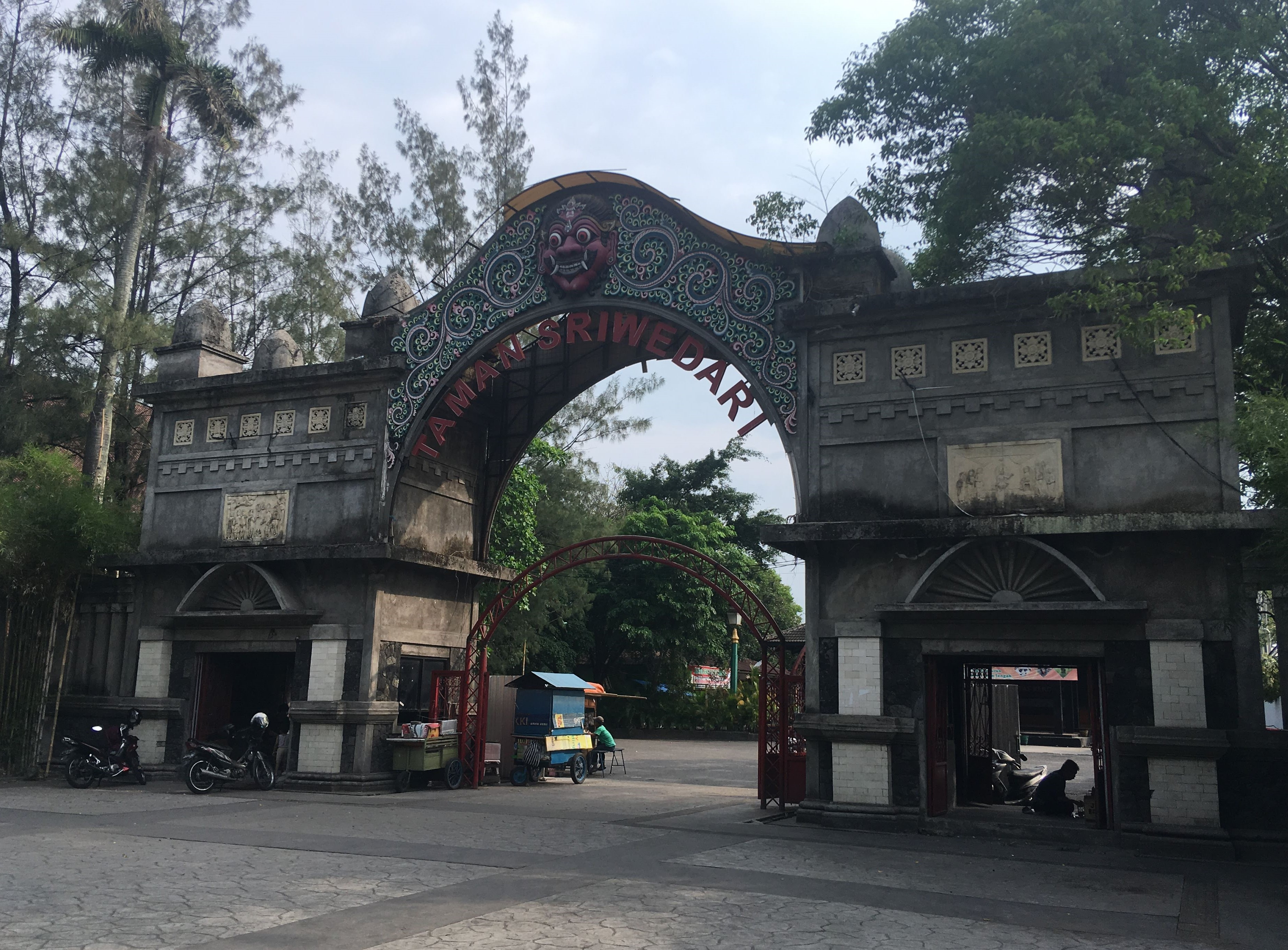
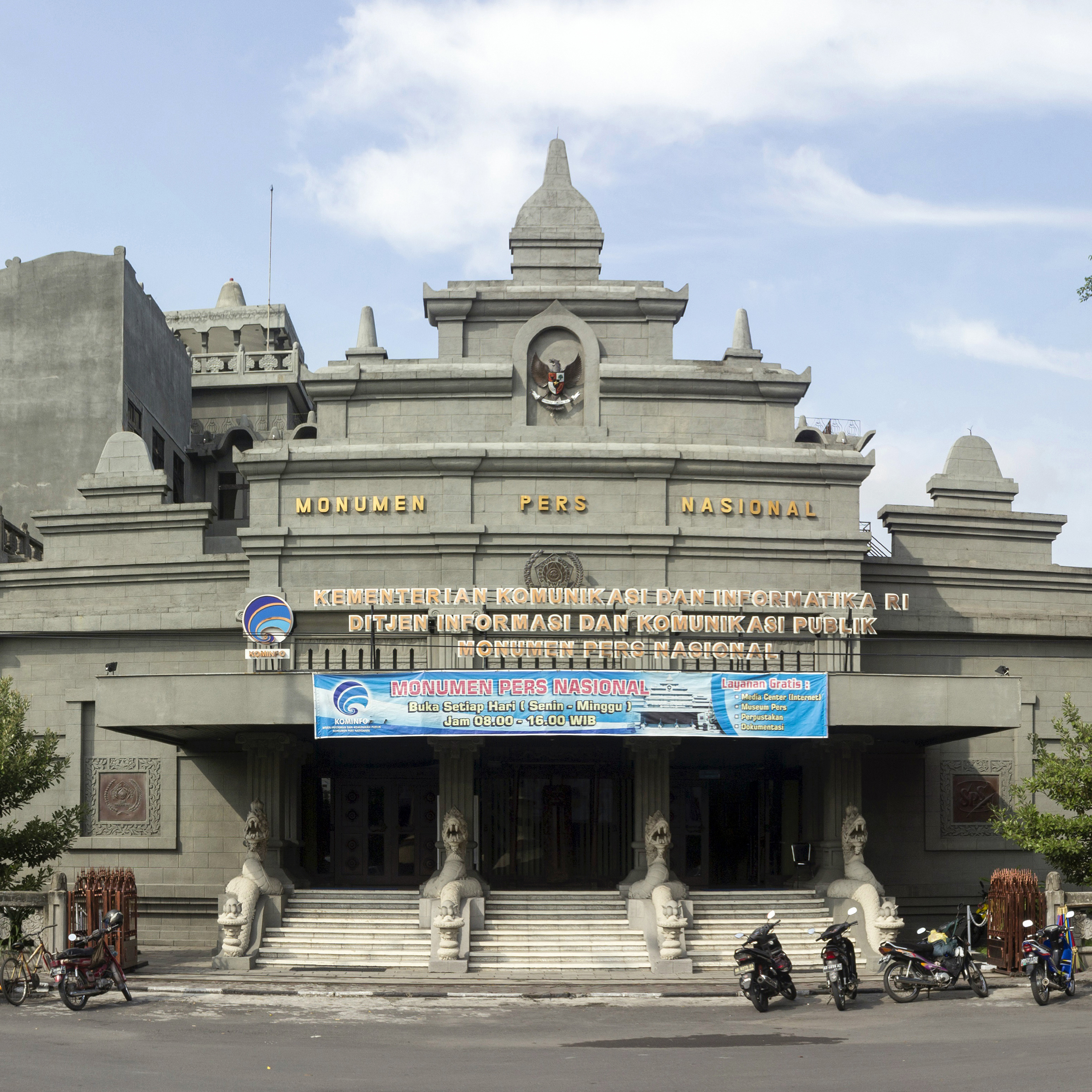
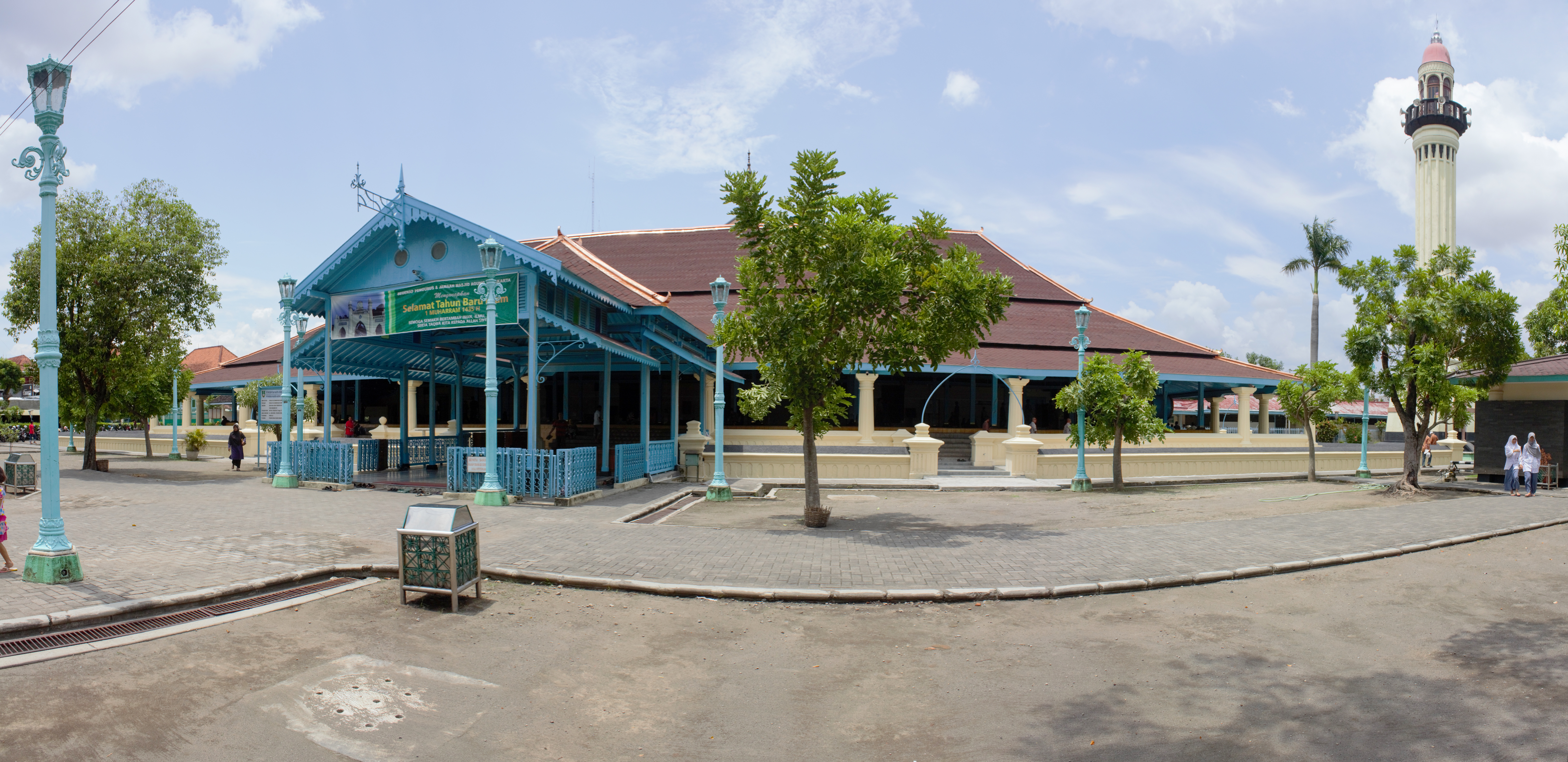
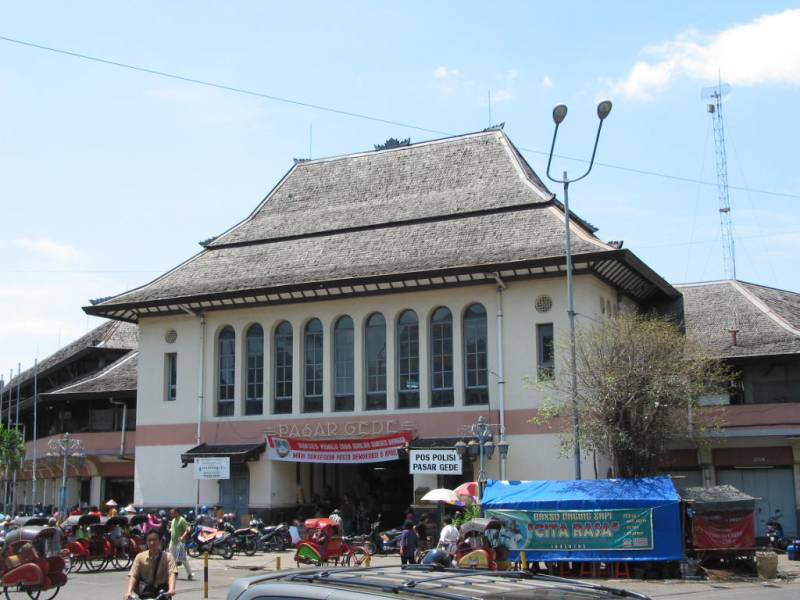
- Kraton Surakarta Hadiningrat Statue of Slamet Riyadi Bank Indonesia office Sriwedari Park National Press Monument Great Mosque of Surakarta Pasar Gede Hardjonagoro

- Coat of arms
- Motto: The Spirit of Java
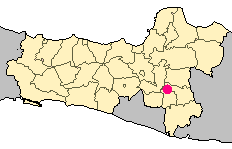
- Location within Central Java

- Location in Java and Indonesia Surakarta (Indonesia)
- Coordinates: 7°34′0″S 110°49′0″E
- Country: Indonesia
- Province: Central Java

Government
  - Type: Mayor-council
  - Body: Surakarta City Government
  - Mayor: Respati Ardi (Gerindra)
  - Vice Mayor: Astrid Widayani
  - Legislature: Surakarta City Regional House of Representatives (DPRD)

Area
  - City: 46.72 km^{2} (18.04 sq mi)
  - Metro: 5,923.25 km^{2} (2,286.98 sq mi)
- Elevation: 92 m (302 ft)

Population (mid 2025 estimate)
  - City: 529,079
  - Density: 11,320/km^{2} (29,330/sq mi)
  - Metro: 6,899,402
- Demonym(s): Surakartan wong Solo, tiyang Solo (Javanese) orang Solo (Indonesian)
- Time zone: UTC+7 (Indonesia Western Time)
- Area code: (+62) 271
- Vehicle registration: AD
- HDI (2024): ▲0.844 (9th) very high
- Website: surakarta.go.id

Surakarta (Javanese: ꦯꦸꦫꦏꦂꦠ, Pegon: سوراكارتا), known colloquially as Solo (Javanese: ꦱꦭ, romanized: Sålå), is a major city in Central Java, Indonesia. The 46.72 km^{2} (18.04 sq mi) city adjoins Karanganyar Regency and Boyolali Regency to the north, Karanganyar Regency and Sukoharjo Regency to the east and west, and Sukoharjo Regency to the south. On the eastern side of Solo flows Solo River (Bengawan Solo). Its metropolitan area, consisting of Surakarta City and the surrounding six regencies ("Greater Solo Area", formerly Special Region of Surakarta), was home to 6,899,402 inhabitants according to the official estimates for mid 2025, 529,079 of whom resided in the city proper (comprising 260,347 males and 268,732 females).

Surakarta is the birthplace of former President of Indonesia Joko Widodo, as well as his son and current Vice President of Indonesia, Gibran Rakabuming Raka. The former served as Mayor of Surakarta from 2005 to 2012, as did the latter from 2021 to 2024.

== History ==
Hominid habitation in the region of Surakarta is evidenced from roughly one million years ago, the age of the "Java Man" skeleton found 80 kilometres upstream. Another famous early hominid from this area is called "Solo Man".

The Surakarta area was part of the Mataram kingdom and at this time a village called Wulayu seems to have already existed in or around the present-day city of Surakarta, as evidenced by a ferry charter issued by Balitung in A.D. 904. The Majapahit Empire renewed this ferry charter in 1358.

By the 18th century, the village had acquired the name of Sala. This name is said to be derived from the sala tree. As the Javanese pronunciation "Sala" ([sɔlɔ]) was considered difficult to pronounce by the Dutch, the name later morphed into "Solo" ([solo]).

In 1745, based on astrological calculations and Dutch commercial interest, Surakarta was chosen to be the new capital of the Mataram Sultanate which was on the verge of becoming a vassal state of the Dutch East India Company. The formal name is derived from the previous capital Kartasura. The official court history claims that Surakarta originally stood on a lake, which was drained by the favor of the mythical queen of the southern sea, Kanjeng Ratu Kidul.

In the ensuing colonial era, the kingdom of Mataram was divided into the Surakarta Sunanate (northern court) and the Yogyakarta Sultanate (southern court). Surakarta was ruled by hereditary monarchs, who were given the unique Javanese cultural title Susuhunan. Since both Surakarta and Yogyakarta had become vassal states of the Dutch, traditional court arts, notably gamelan, were developed to demonstrate cultural power instead of developing military power.

=== Pakubuwono X ===
Perhaps the most significant ruler of the 20th century was Pakubuwono X. His relationship with the Dutch, his large family, and his popularity contributed to perhaps the largest funeral procession that ever occurred in Surakarta. He had spent a large amount of money on the Royal Graveyard at Imogiri, both the main sections of the graveyard and the new section where he was buried. In the era just before independence, Surakarta had European, Chinese, and Arab quarters.

=== Struggle for independence ===
After hearing the proclamation of Indonesian Independence, Pakubuwono XII declared Surakarta a part of the Republic of Indonesia. Because of this support, President Sukarno declared Surakarta a Special Region with the Susuhunan, Pakubuwono XII, continuing as governor. This terminology was also used for the Special Region of Yogyakarta, which continues to be legally governed by its sultan to this day. However, unlike Yogyakarta, Surakarta had intense, organized resistance to the continuation of the monarchy. In October 1945, a republican movement was established in Surakarta led by Tan Malaka, a member of the Indonesian Communist Party.

On 17 October, the vizier of Surakarta, KRMH Sosrodiningrat V (a member of the BPUPK), was kidnapped. The new vizier, KRMT Yudonagoro, and 9 other court officials were also kidnapped by the same movement in March 1946, including the heir to the viziership KRMTH Wuryaningrat.

In response, Prime Minister of Indonesia Sutan Syahrir met with Wuryaningrat and other Surakarta leaders in May and agreed to abolish the established government entirely.

On 16 June 1946, the Surakarta "special region" was abolished and replaced with a regency (kabupaten), administered by a republican government outside the control of the Susuhunan and his court. This event is commemorated as the birthday of the city of Surakarta.

On 26 June Sutan Syahrir was kidnapped in Surakarta by a rebel movement led by Major General Soedarsono, the commander of the 3rd division. President Sukarno was angry at this kidnapping and on 1 July 1946, 14 communist leaders including Tan Malaka were arrested by Indonesian police on Sukarno's instructions. However, Soedarsono freed the rebel leaders immediately. Sukarno asked the local military commander in Surakarta, Lieutenant Colonel Suharto to arrest Soedarsono and the rebel group.

Suharto refused to follow this command unless it was given directly by the Military Chief of Staff, General Soedirman. Sukarno was angry at this rejection of his commanding authority and called Suharto a stubborn (koppig) officer.

Suharto pretended to support the rebellion and persuaded Soedarsono and his group to stay at his headquarters at Wiyoro, Surakarta for their safety. Later that night he persuaded Soedarsono to meet Sukarno at his palace the next morning. Suharto secretly informed the presidential guard troops about Soedarsono's plan on the next morning. On July 3, 1946, Soedarsono and his group were arrested by the presidential guard near the palace. Syahrir was released unharmed. Several months later, Soedarsono and his group were pardoned and released from prison.

However, this did not halt the ascendancy of the Communist Party in Surakarta. In November 1946, the communists kidnapped the regent and vice-regent and seized power for themselves, a coup quickly legitimated after the fact by Sukarno. In 1947, Amir Sjarifuddin appointed Wikana, a communist, as Surakarta's military governor.

In December 1948, the Dutch attacked and occupied the cities of Yogyakarta and Surakarta as part of Operation Kraai. The Indonesian Army, led by General Soedirman, started a guerrilla war in surrounding areas. The Dutch declared that the Republic had been destroyed and no longer existed. To disprove this, the Indonesian army conducted large-scale raids into the cities of Yogyakarta and Surakarta, called Serangan Oemoem. On 7 August 1949, Indonesian troops led by Slamet Riyadi managed to defeat the Dutch troops and occupied the city for several hours. To commemorate this event, the main street of the city of Surakarta was renamed Brigadier General Slamet Riyadi Street.

Surakarta remained under communist control until October 1965. Local government was unclear about how to proceed after the 30 September Movement and went about business as usual. As a result, Suharto's forces entered Surakarta without resistance, mobilized local youth paramilitaries, and indiscriminately slaughtered the entire local government.

== Geography ==
The water sources for Surakarta are in the valley of Merapi, a total of 19 locations, with a capacity of 3,404 L/second (899.2 U.S. gal/sec). The average source water height is 800–1,200 m (2,600–3,900 ft) above sea level. In 1890–1927 there were only 12 wells in Surakarta. Today, underground water wells in 23 locations produce about 45 L/second (11.9 U.S. gal/sec).

In March 2006, Surakarta's state water company (PDAM) had a production capacity of 865.02 L/second (228.5 U.S. gal/sec): from Cokrotulung, Klaten, 27 km (17 mi) from Surakarta, 387 L/s (102.2 U.S. gal/sec); and from 26 deep wells, with a total capacity of 478.02 L/second (126.3 U.S. gal/sec). The total reservoir capacity is 9,140 m^{3} (,414,533 U.S. gala) nd can serve 55,22% of the population.

=== Climate ===
Surakarta features a tropical monsoon climate (Köppen: Am). with a lengthy wet season spanning from October through May, and a relatively short dry season covering the remaining four months (June through September). On average Surakarta receives just under 2,200 mm (87 in) of rainfall annually, with its wettest months being December, January, and February. As is common in areas featuring a tropical monsoon climate, temperatures are relatively consistent throughout the year. Surakarta's average temperature is roughly 30 °C every month (86 °F).

Climate data for Surakarta, Central Java, Indonesia
Month	Jan	Feb	Mar	Apr	May	Jun	Jul	Aug	Sep	Oct	Nov	Dec	Year
Mean daily maximum °C (°F)	30.1 (86.2)	30.2 (86.4)	30.5 (86.9)	31.4 (88.5)	31.1 (88.0)	31.1 (88.0)	30.9 (87.6)	31.6 (88.9)	32.4 (90.3)	32.9 (91.2)	31.7 (89.1)	30.9 (87.6)	31.2 (88.2)
Daily mean °C (°F)	26.2 (79.2)	26.3 (79.3)	26.4 (79.5)	26.9 (80.4)	26.5 (79.7)	25.9 (78.6)	25.4 (77.7)	25.7 (78.3)	26.6 (79.9)	27.4 (81.3)	26.9 (80.4)	26.6 (79.9)	26.4 (79.5)
Mean daily minimum °C (°F)	22.3 (72.1)	22.4 (72.3)	22.3 (72.1)	22.4 (72.3)	21.9 (71.4)	20.8 (69.4)	20.0 (68.0)	19.9 (67.8)	20.9 (69.6)	21.9 (71.4)	22.2 (72.0)	22.3 (72.1)	21.6 (70.9)
Average precipitation mm (inches)	324 (12.8)	318 (12.5)	306 (12.0)	214 (8.4)	145 (5.7)	86 (3.4)	52 (2.0)	42 (1.7)	51 (2.0)	120 (4.7)	212 (8.3)	260 (10.2)	2,130 (83.7)
Source: climate-data.org

== Administrative divisions ==
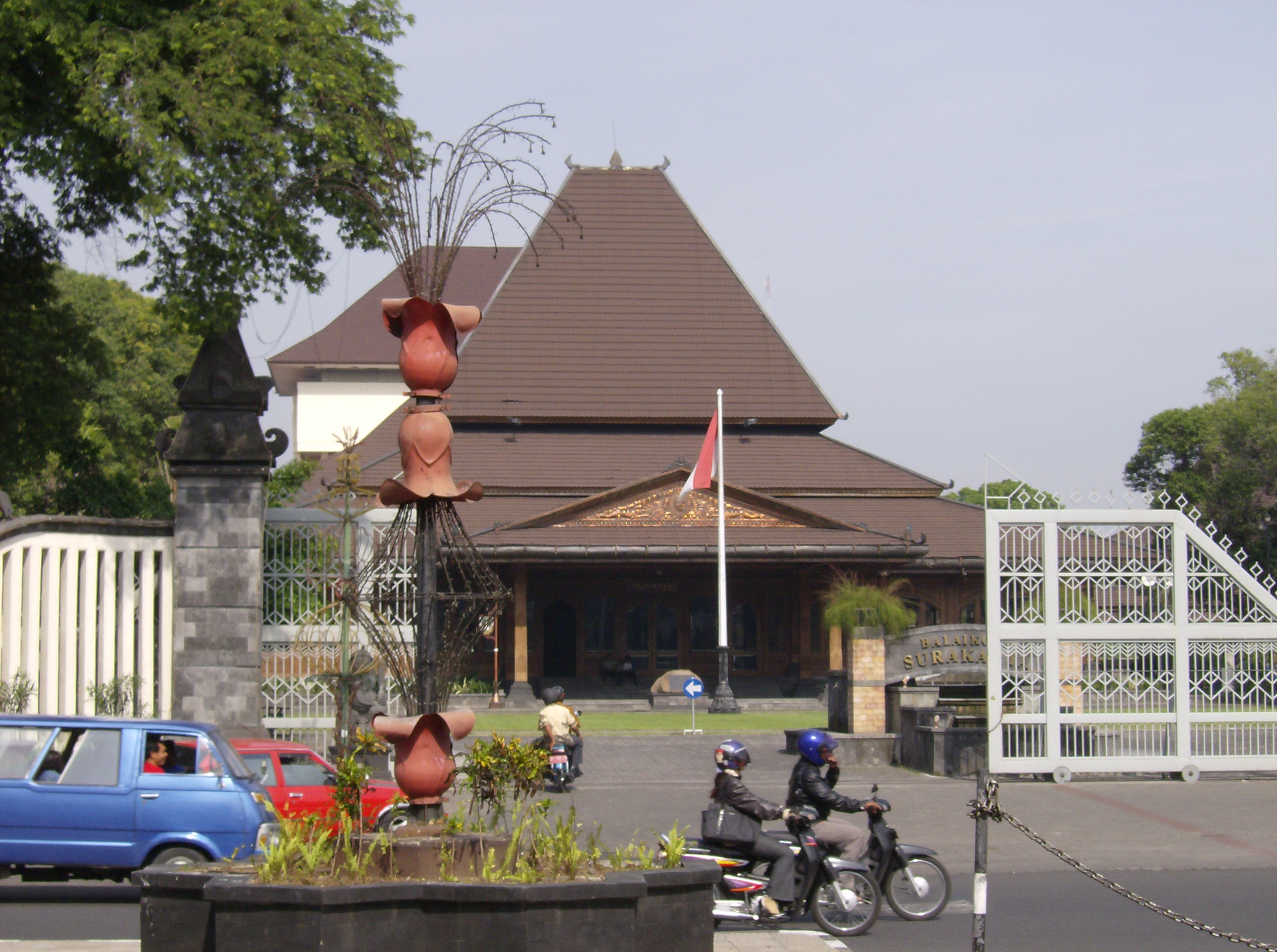
Surakarta City Hall.

After Surakarta became a city, it was divided into five districts (kecamatan), each led by a camat, and subdivided into 51 kelurahan (now 54), each led by a lurah. The districts of Surakarta City are tabulated below with their areas and their populations at the 2010 Census and 2020 Census together with the latest official estimates as of mid 2025. The table also includes the locations of the district administrative centres, the number of administrative villages in each district (all classed as urban kelurahan), and the district postal codes:

Kode Wilayah	Name of district (kecamatan)	Area in km^{2}	Pop'n Census 2010	Pop'n Census 2020	Pop'n Estimate mid 2025	Admin Centre	No. of villages	Postal codes
33.72.01	Laweyan ^{(a)}	9.13	86,057	88,524	88,978	Penumping	11	57141 - 57149
33.72.02	Serengan	3.08	43,653	47,778	48,567	Serengan	7	57151 - 57157
33.72.03	Pasar Kliwon	4.88	74,269	78,517	79,972	Joyosuran	10	57111 - 57119
33.72.04	Jebres	14.38	138,049	138,775	139,321	Jebres	11	57121 - 57129 ^{(b)}
33.72.05	Banjarsari	15.26	157,309	168,770	172,241	Banyuanyar	15	57131 - 57139
	Totals	46.72	499,337	522,364	529,079		54	

Notes: (a) also spelled "Lawiyan". (b) except the kelurahan of Jagalan, which has the postcode of 57162.

=== Greater Surakarta ===
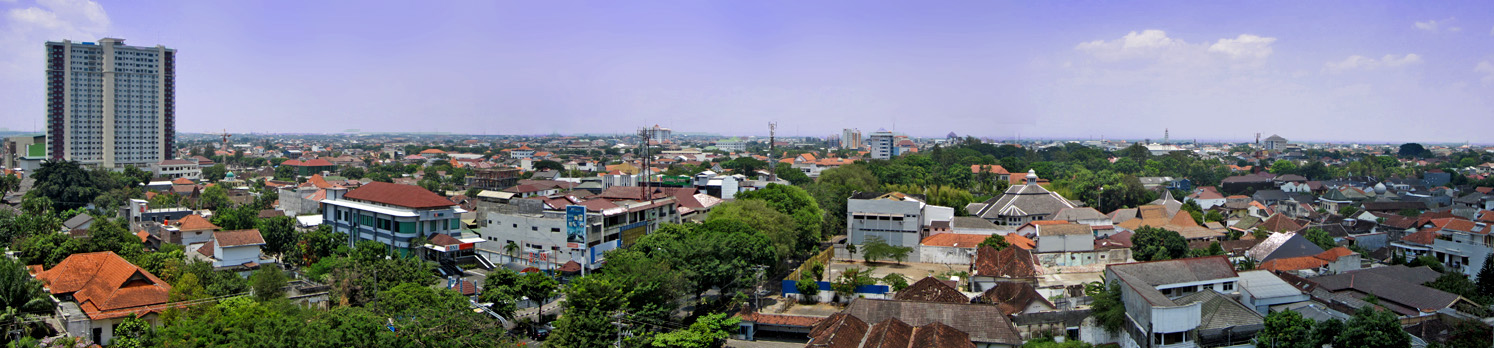
Panorama view of Surakarta at day.

Surakarta as a densely populated core city in Central Java, and its second city, spills considerably into neighboring regencies. Surakarta City and its surrounding regencies, Karanganyar, Sragen, Wonogiri, Sukoharjo, Klaten, and Boyolali, are collectively called the Former Surakarta Residency (Dutch: Residentie Soerakarta).

Though a traffic study quotes the population as 1,158,000 as of 2008, this reflects only the continuously built-up area, as the city affects entire neighboring regencies by significantly driving up overall population densities in Sukoharjo Regency and Klaten Regency over the already dense countryside. Furthermore, the government of Indonesia officially defines a broader region as Surakarta's extended metropolitan zone, with the acronym "Subosukawonosraten" (for SUrakarta, BOyolali, SUkoharjo, KAranganyar, WONOgiri, SRAgen, KlaTEN) as the city and the entire 6 surrounding regencies, which reflects a broader planning region, though not a core metropolitan area as some of its regencies are not particularly suburbanized. Both the metropolitan area and extended areas border Yogyakarta's metropolitan area, while only the extended metropolitan area borders Kedungsapur or Greater Semarang.

Administrative division	Area (in km^{2})	Pop'n 2010 Census	Pop'n 2020 Census	Pop'n mid 2025 estimate
Surakarta Municipality	46.72	499,337	522,364	529,079
Boyolali Regency	1,015.10	930,531	1,062,713	1,109,332
Klaten Regency	701.52	1,130,047	1,260,506	1,304,428
Sukoharjo Regency	493.23	824,238	907,587	918,610
Wonogiri Regency	1,904.32	928,904	1,043,177	1,057,045
Karanganyar Regency	767.79	813,196	931,963	968,484
Sragen Regency	994.57	858,266	976,951	1,011,824
Greater Surakarta (Subosukawonosraten)	5,923.25	5,984,499	6,705,261	6,899,402

== Demography ==
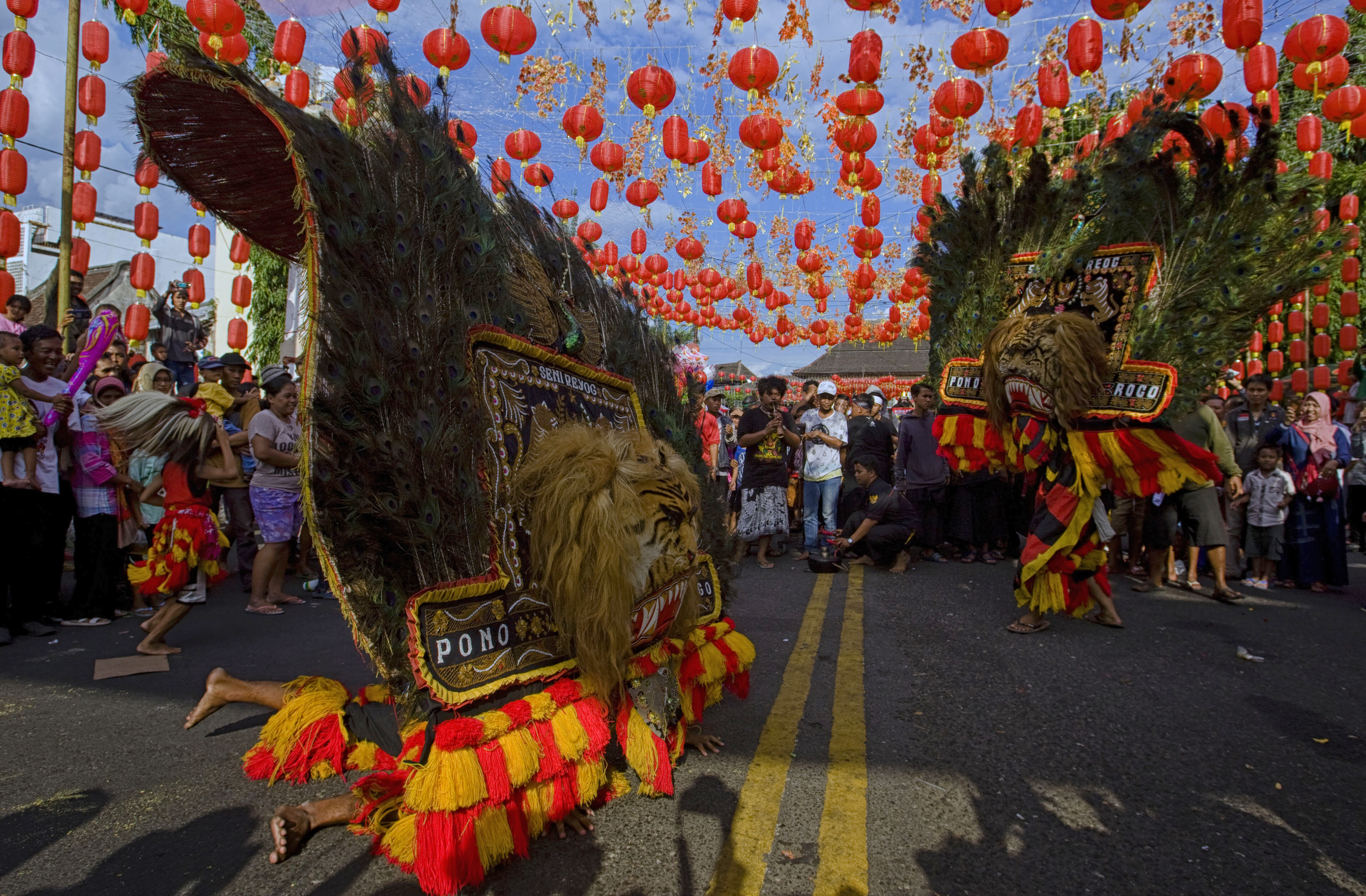
Javanese Reog attraction during Grebeg Sudiro festival in celebrates Chinese New Year

One of the earliest censuses held in Surakarta Residency (Residentie Soerakarta) was in 1885. At that time, with an area of about 5,677 km^{2} (2,192 sq mi), there were 1,053,985 people in Surakarta Residency, including 2,694 Europeans and 7,543 Indonesian-Chinese. The area is 130 times the current area of Surakarta and had a population density of 186 people/km^{2} (480 people/mi^{2}). The capital of the residency itself (roughly the size of the City of Solo proper) in 1880 had 124,041 people living in it.

According to the 2009 estimate, there were 245,043 males and 283,159 females (a sex ratio of 86.54) in Surakarta. 119,951 of the population were 14 years or younger, 376,180 were between 15 and 64, and 32,071 were above 65. The number of households was 142,627 and the average number of household members was 3.7. The population growth in the last 10 years was about 0.565% per year.

The labor force of Solo in 2009 was 275,546, of whom 246,768 were working, while 28,778 were seeking work. Another 148,254 people aged 15 and above were not in the labor force. Based on employment numbers, the most common work in Solo was worker/paid employee (112,336), followed by self-employee (56,112), self-employee assisted by temporary employee (32,769), unpaid employee (20,193), self-employee assisted by permanent employee (14,880), freelance employee in non-agricultural work (10,241), and freelance employee in agricultural work (237). Based on the industry, most people in Solo worked in trade (106,426), services (59,780), manufacturing (42,065), communication (16,815), construction (9,217), financing (9,157), or agriculture (2,608), and the rest in mining, electricity, gas, and water companies (700).

The mean working week in Solo was 47.04 hours (47.74 for men and 46.13 for women), and 212,262 people worked more than 35 hours per week compared to 34,506 who worked less than that.

=== Education ===
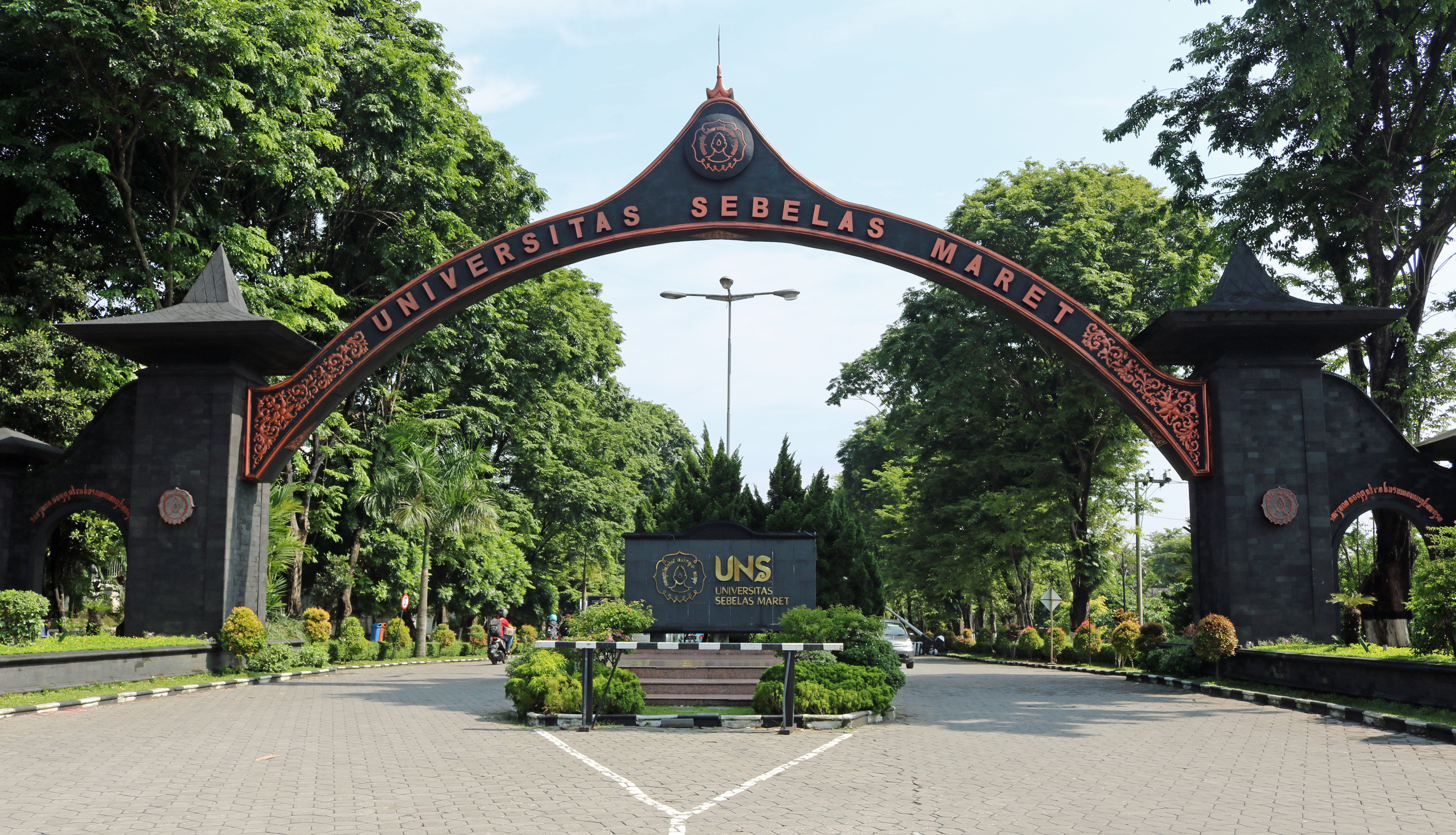
Sebelas Maret University campus gate

According to 2009 statistics, 242,070 people above 15 in the city had finished high school, while 86,890 had only finished junior high school, and 94,840 were still in school or had only finished elementary school. The percentage of high-school graduates was the highest of the cities and regencies in Central Java.

According to the statistics of Data Pokok Pendidikan (Dapodik), in the 2010/2011 school year, there were 68,153 students and 853 schools in Surakarta. There are two big universities possessing more than 20.000 students: Sebelas Maret University (UNS) and Muhammadiyah University of Surakarta (UMS), both are recognised as among Indonesia's 50 best universities according to the Directorate of Higher Education, Ministry of Education RI. There is also arts concentrated university Art Institute of Surakarta (ISI), religious studies State Islamic Institute (IAIN Surakarta). There are around 52 private universities and colleges such as STIKES Muhammadiyah, Universitas Tunas Pembangunan, Universitas Slamet Riyadi, Universitas Surakarta, Universitas Setia Budi, etc.

=== Economy ===
The per capita GDP of Surakarta in 2009 was 16,813,058.62 IDR, the fourth highest in Central Java after Kudus, Cilacap, and Semarang. The living standard in 2009 was 723,000 IDR. The Consumer price index in January 2011 was 119.44.

=== Religion ===
Data from the Ministry of Home Affairs at the end of 2023 recorded that the population of Surakarta adheres to various religions, with the majority being Muslim. Of the 586,166 residents, 79.43% are Muslims, followed by Christians at 20.28%, consisting of 13.49% Protestants and 6.79% Catholics. A small portion adheres to Buddhism at 0.20%, Hinduism at 0.06%, and the remaining 0.03% follow Confucianism and indigenous beliefs.

The historic places of worship in Surakarta are diverse, reflecting the variety of faiths practiced by its residents, including the largest and most sacred mosque located to the west of the Northern Square of the Kasunanan Palace, the Great Mosque of Surakarta, built around 1763 under the initiative of Sunan Pakubuwana III, Al Wustho Mangkunegaran Mosque, Laweyan Mosque, which is the oldest mosque in Surakarta, St. Peter's Church on Jalan Slamet Riyadi, St. Anthony (Purbayan) Church, and the Tri Dharma Tien Kok Sie Temple, Am Po Kian Monastery, and Sahasra Adhi Pura Hindu Temple.

On November 14, 2022, President Widodo and his Emirati counterpart, Sheikh Mohamed bin Zayed Al Nahyan, inaugurated the Sheikh Zayed Grand Mosque. Built at a cost of $20 million, it is a smaller replica of the grand mosque in Abu Dhabi, and is named in honour of the UAE's founder, Sheikh Zayed bin Sultan Al Nahyan. Construction for the mosque began on 8 March 2021. Sheikh Mohamed had offered it to President Widodo when the former visited Indonesia in July 2019.

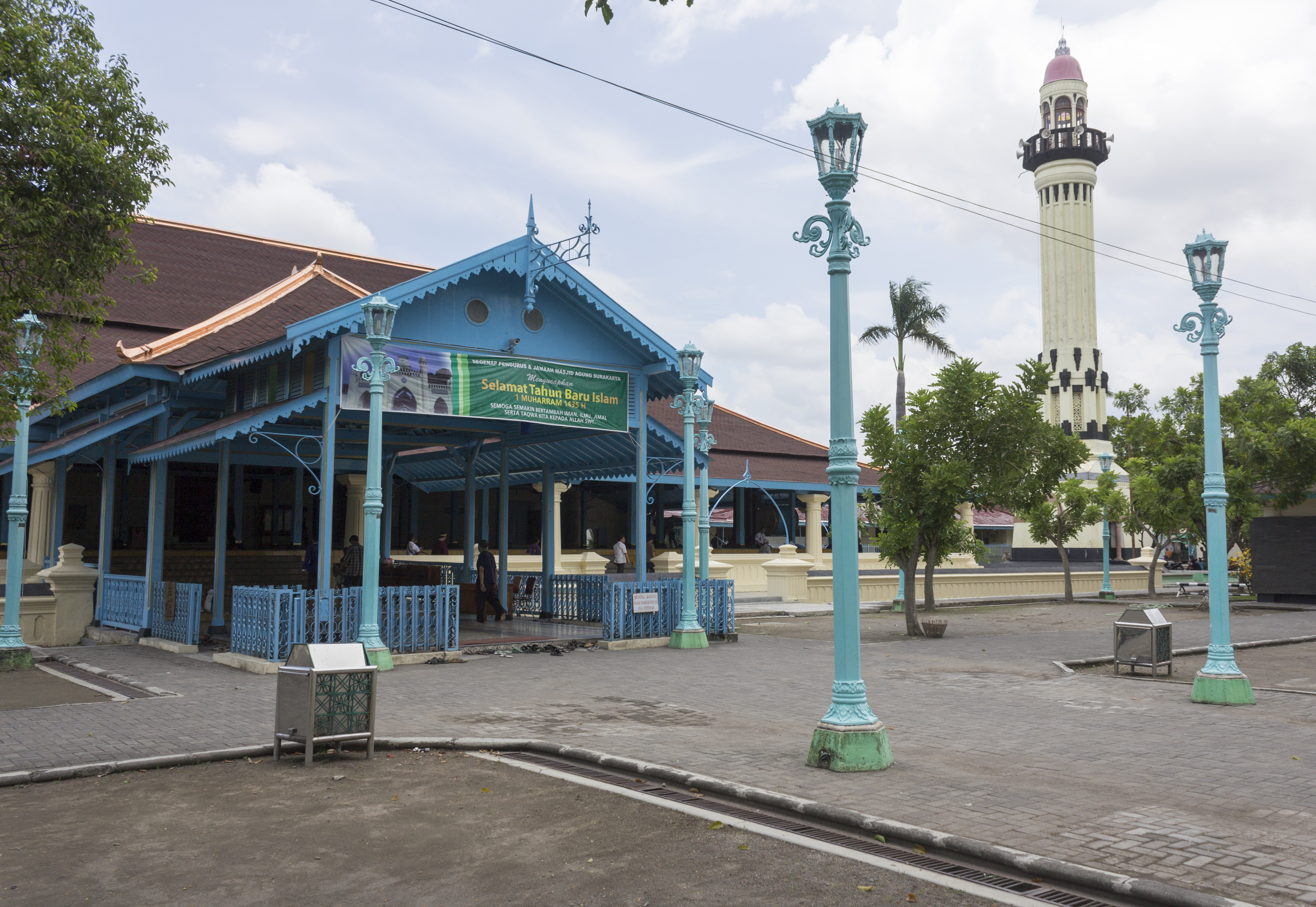
Great Mosque of Surakarta

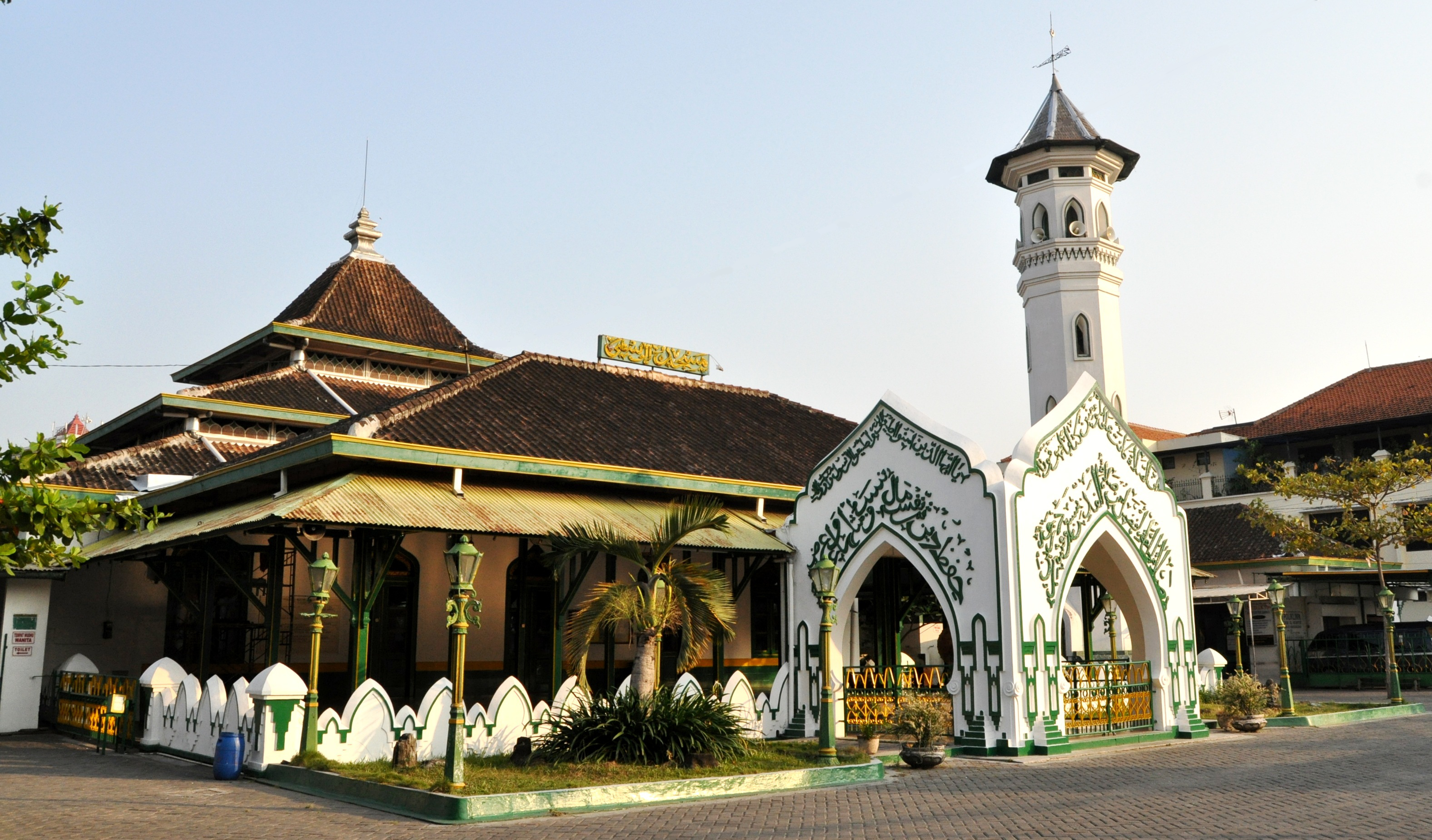
Al-Wustho Mangkunegaran Mosque

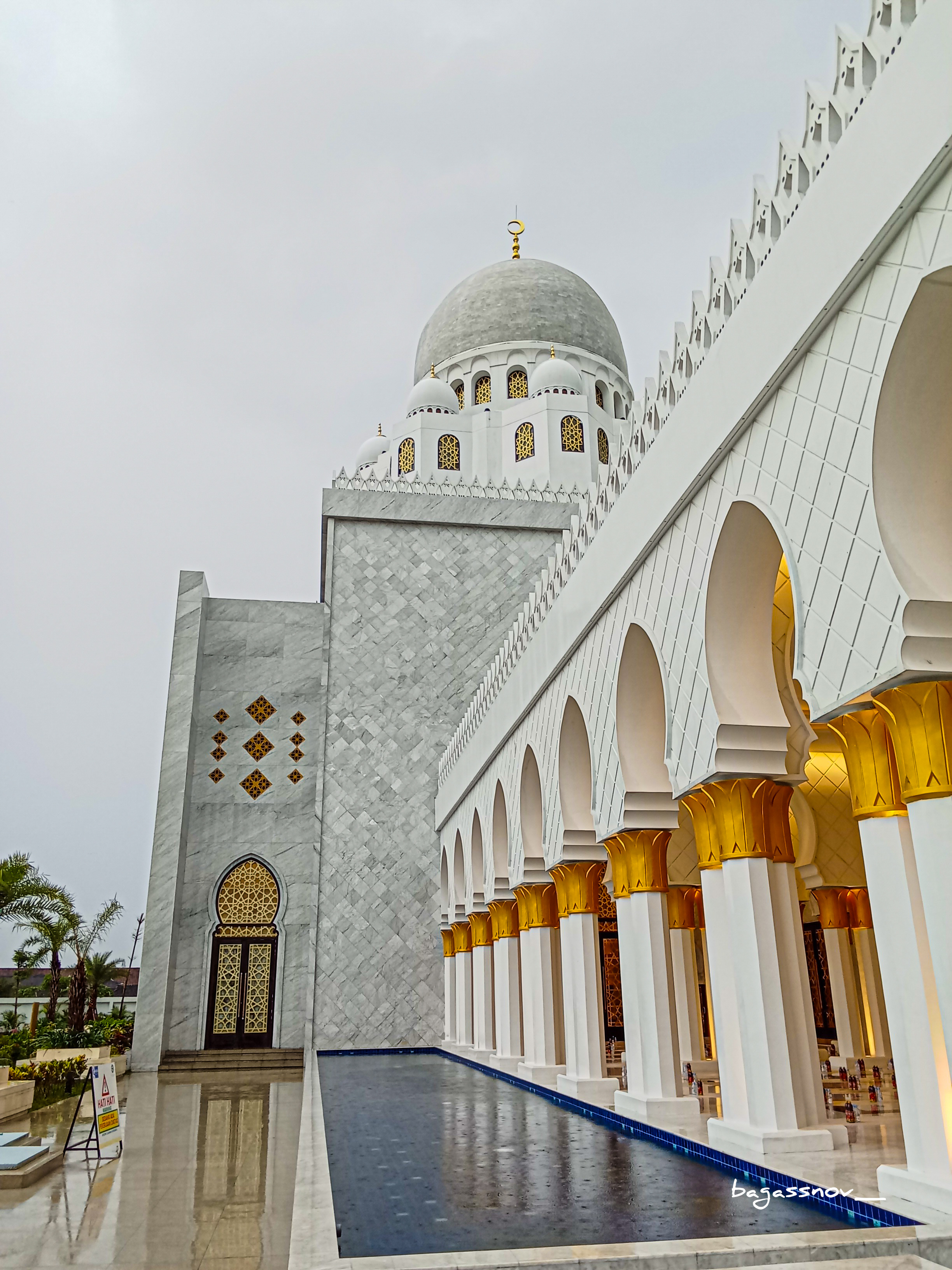
Sheikh Zayed Grand Mosque

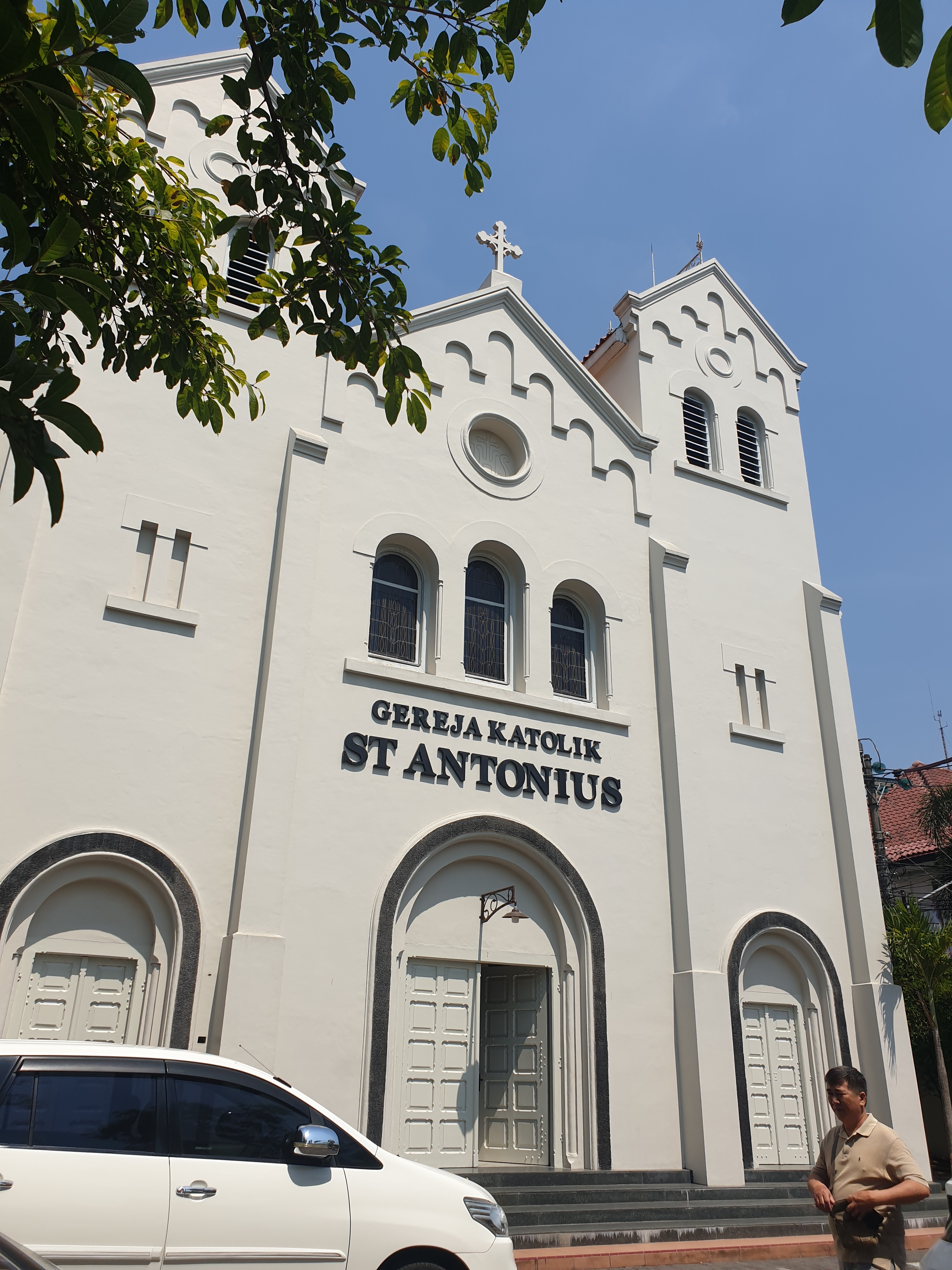
St. Anthony Church

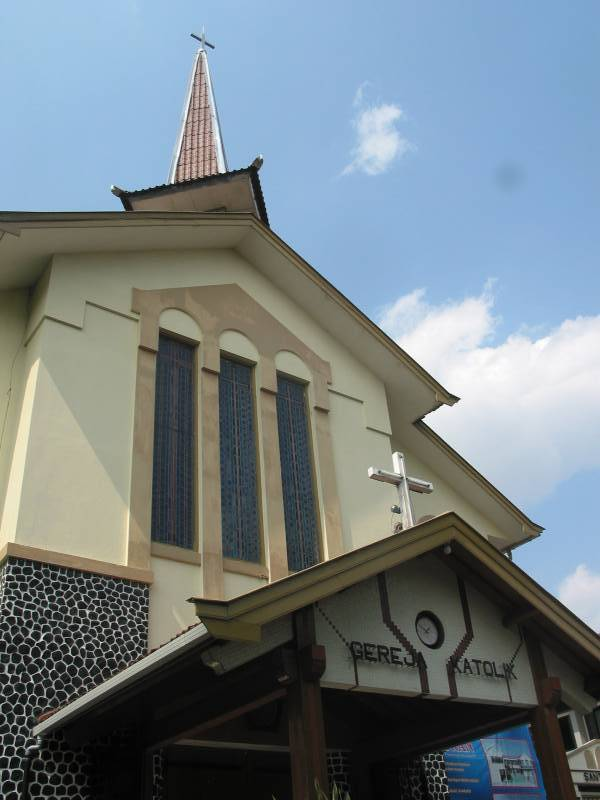
St. Peter's Church

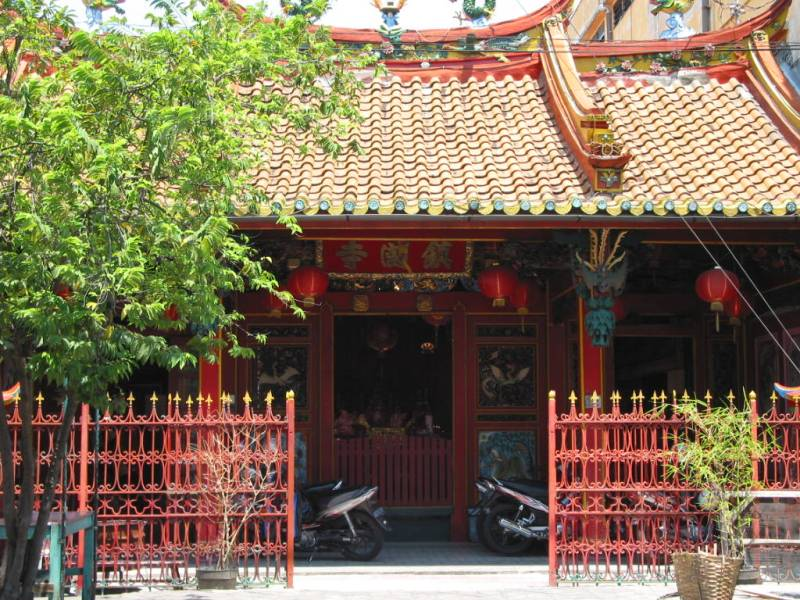
Tien Kok Sie Temple

== Culture ==
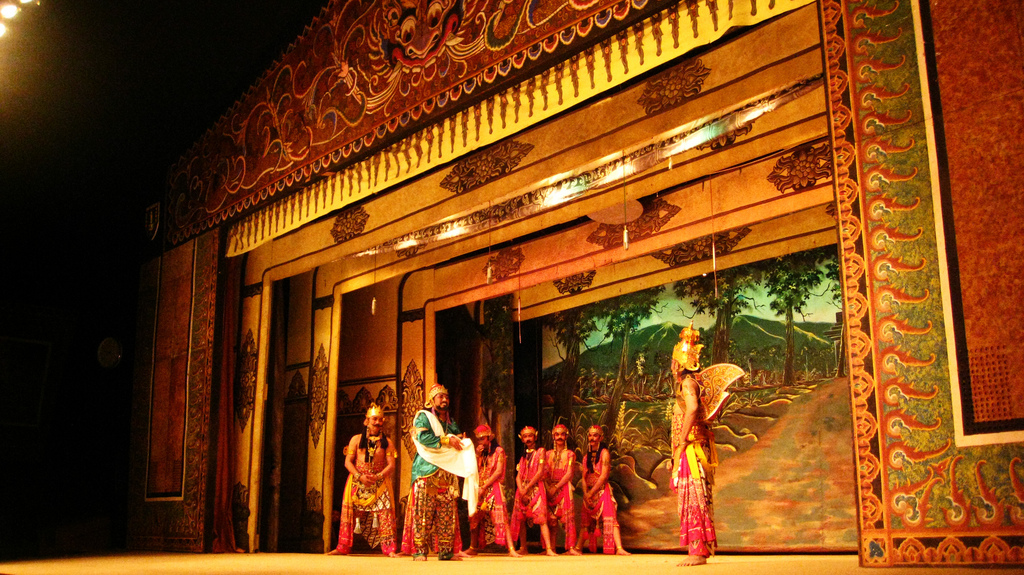
A wayang wong performance played in Sriwedari, Surakarta

Surakarta is known as one of the cultural centers of Javanese culture, as it is traditionally one of the political and cultural hubs for Javanese traditions. The region's prosperity since the 19th century has driven the development of various Javanese literature, dance, culinary arts, fashion, architecture, and various other cultural expressions. People are aware of the cultural 'competition' between Surakarta and Yogyakarta, leading to what is known as the 'Surakarta-style' and the 'Yogyakarta-style' in clothing, dance movements, wayang (shadow puppet) craftsmanship, batik processing, gamelan music, and so forth.

=== Language ===
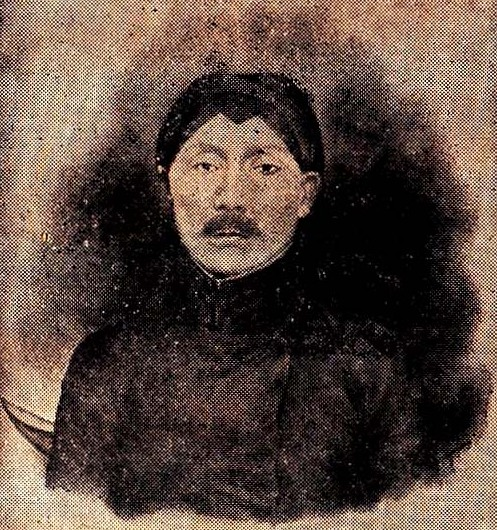
R. Ng. Ranggawarsita was a prominent poet of Javanese literature and culture who was born and lived in Surakarta. He is regarded as the last great poet of Java.

The language spoken in Surakarta is the Mataraman Javanese dialect with the Surakarta variant. The Mataraman dialect is also spoken in areas such as Yogyakarta, Semarang, Ngawi, Madiun, Magetan, Ponorogo, Pacitan, Trenggalek, Tulungagung, Nganjuk, Blitar, and Kediri. Nevertheless, the local Surakarta variant is known as the 'refined variant' due to its extensive use of krama (formal language) in daily conversations, more so than in other areas. The Surakarta Javanese variant is also used as the standard Javanese language nationally and internationally, such as in Suriname. Some words also undergo specification, such as the pronunciation of inggih ('yes' in krama form), which is pronounced fully as /iŋgɪh/, unlike in other variants where it is pronounced 'injih' (/iŋdʒɪh/), as in Yogyakarta and Magelang. In many respects, the Surakarta variant is closer to the Ngawi and Madiun-Kediri variants than to other Central Javanese dialects.

Despite the daily use of the national language, Indonesian, under the leadership of Mayor Joko Widodo, the use of Javanese was revived in public places, including on street signs, government offices, and private businesses.

Surakarta also played a role in the formation of the Indonesian language as the national language. In 1938, in commemoration of the tenth anniversary of the Youth Pledge, the First Indonesian Language Congress was held in Surakarta. The congress was attended by prominent linguists and cultural figures of the time, such as Hoesein Djajadiningrat, Poerbatjaraka, and Ki Hajar Dewantara. The congress produced several important decisions for the growth and development of the Indonesian language, including:

- Replacing the Van Ophuijsen Spelling System
- Establishing the Indonesian Language Institute
- Adopting Indonesian as the official language in representative bodies

=== Dance ===
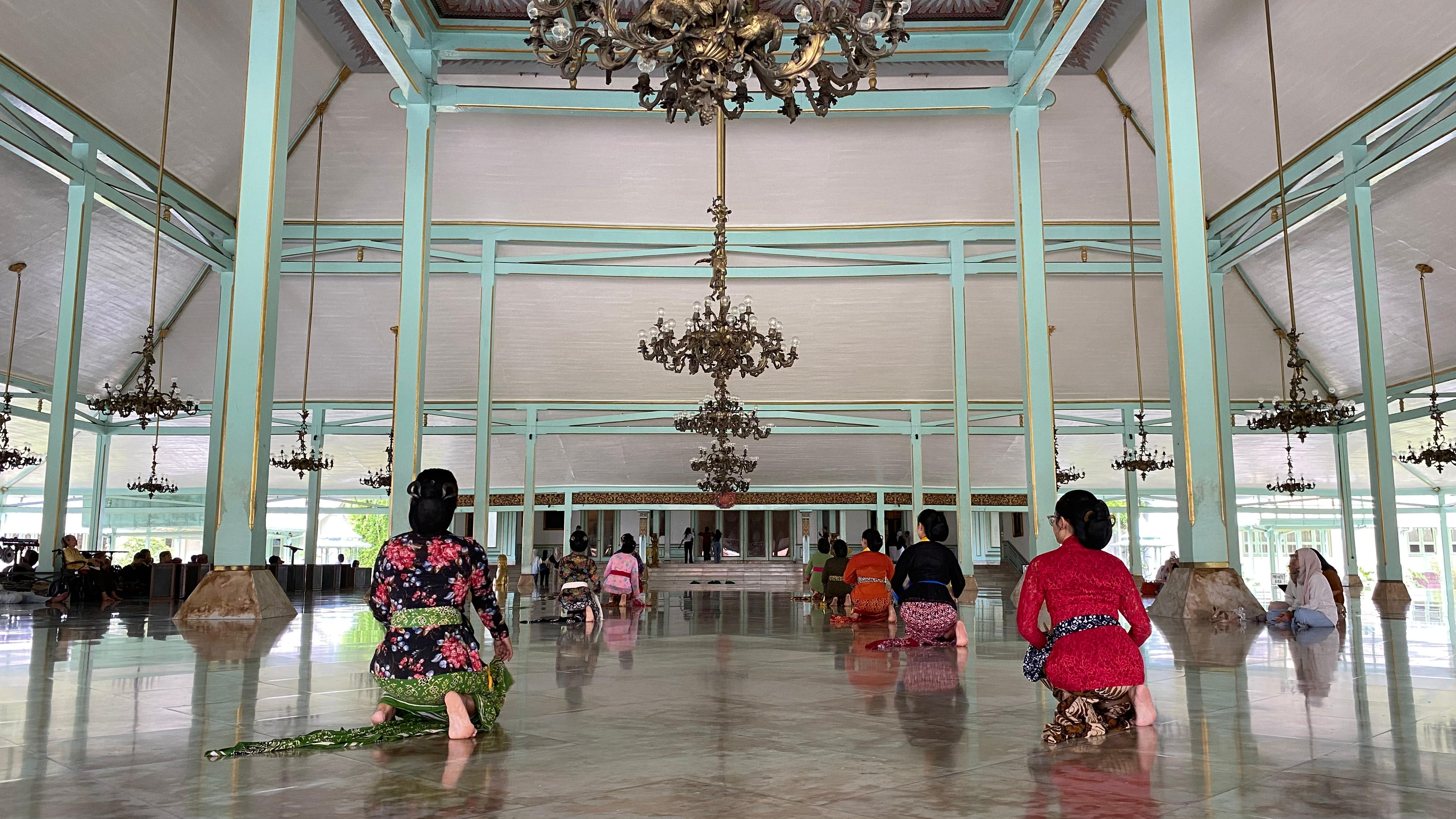
Female dancers at Pendhapa Ageng, Mangkunegaran Palace

Surakarta has several traditional dances, such as Bedhaya (Ketawang, Dorodasih, Sukoharjo, etc.) and Srimpi (Gandakusuma and Sangupati). These dances are still preserved in the Keraton Surakarta and Pura Mangkunegaran as centers for the development and preservation of Javanese culture. The Bedhaya Ketawang dance, for example, is officially performed only once a year to honor Sri Susuhunan Surakarta as the leader of Surakarta.

=== Batik ===
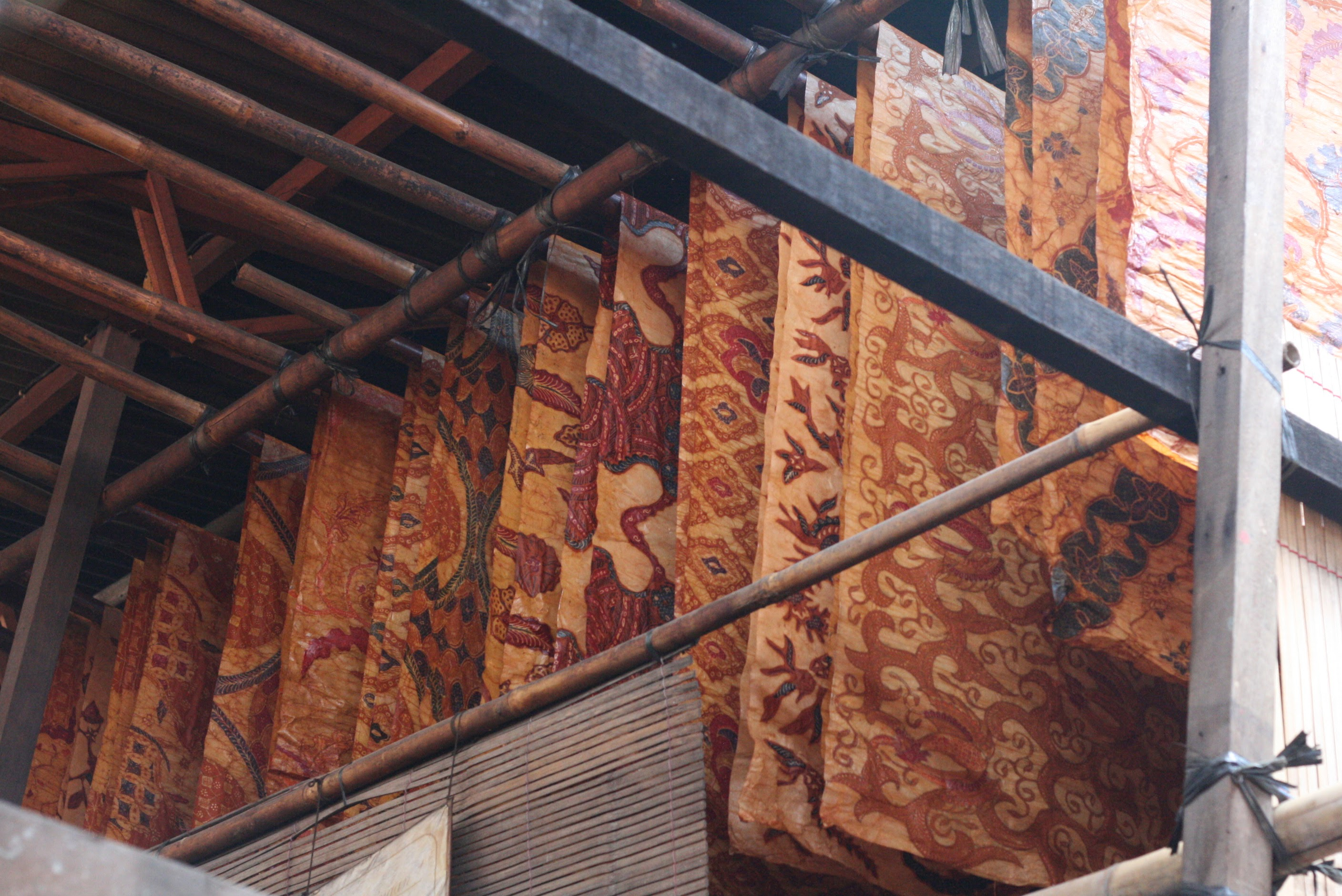
Batik clothes hung to dry, Kauman, Surakarta. Surakartan batik clothes are identified mostly by its brown yellowish color, due to special pretreatment with soga, a natural dye.

Although many batik fabrics are now made using printing processes, Surakarta has many distinctive batik patterns, such as Sidomukti and Sidoluruh. Some well-known batik enterprises include Batik Keris, Batik Danarhadi, and Batik Semar. For the middle-class market, batik can be found in traditional markets like Pasar Klewer, Pusat Grosir Solo (PGS), Beteng Trade Center (BTC), and Ria Batik.

Additionally, in the Laweyan district, there is Kampung Batik Laweyan, a batik production center that has existed since the Pajang Kingdom era in 1546. Another popular destination for tourists is Kampung Batik Kauman. Batik products from Kauman are made using natural silk, woven silk, premium and prima cotton, and rayon. Visitors can also witness the batik production process and even try their hand at making batik.

Surakarta batik is characterized by its distinctive processing method: brownish hues (sogan) fill empty spaces, unlike the Yogyakarta style, where empty spaces are usually brighter. The choice of colors tends to be dark, in line with the preferences of inland batik styles. Batik materials vary from silk to cotton, and the production methods also vary, from hand-drawn batik to stamped batik. Every year, Surakarta holds the Solo Batik Carnival, and since 2010, the local government has operated batik-themed buses known as Batik Solo Trans.

=== Cuisines ===
Some of the Surakartan cuisines

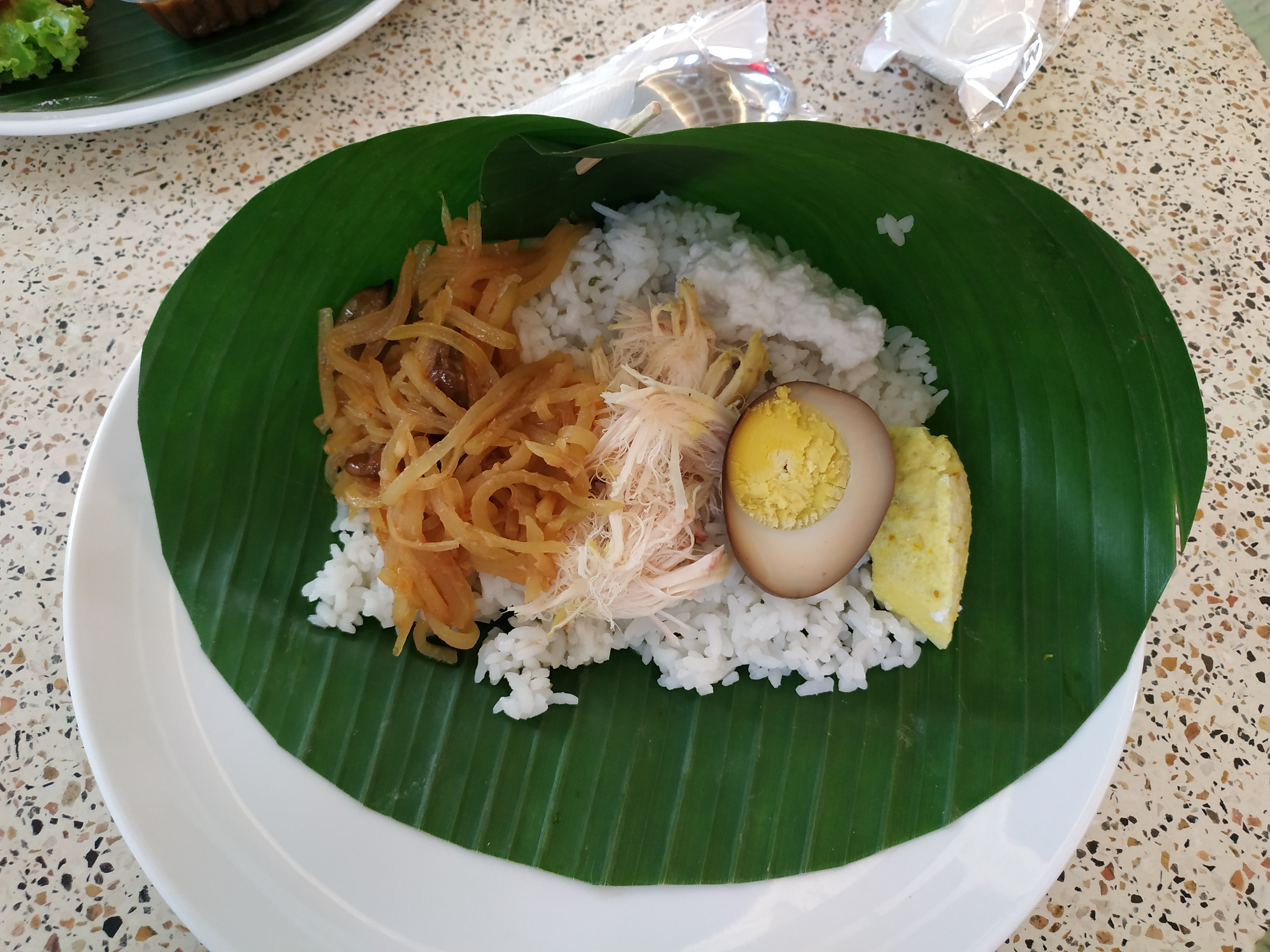
nasi liwet

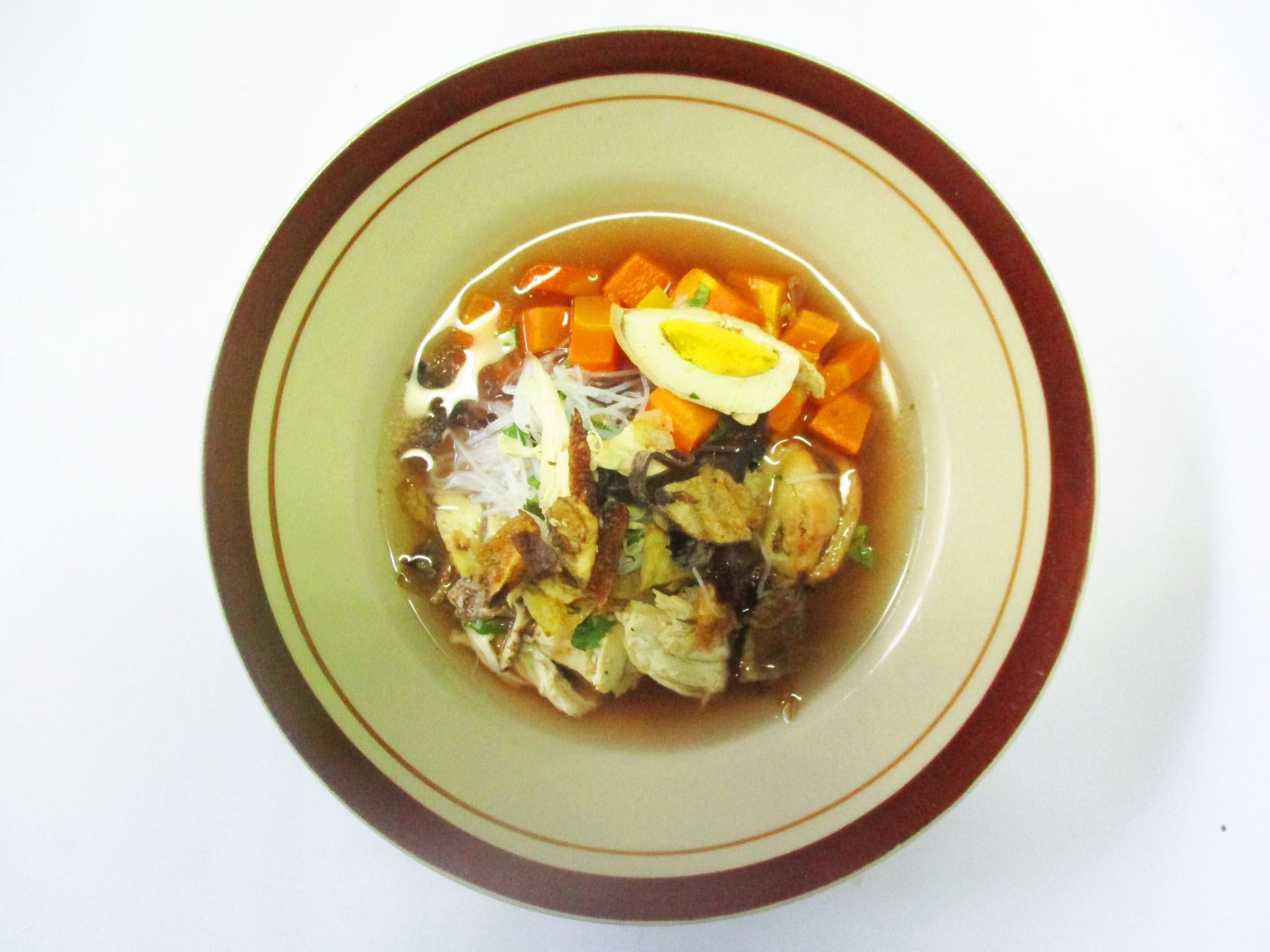
timlo

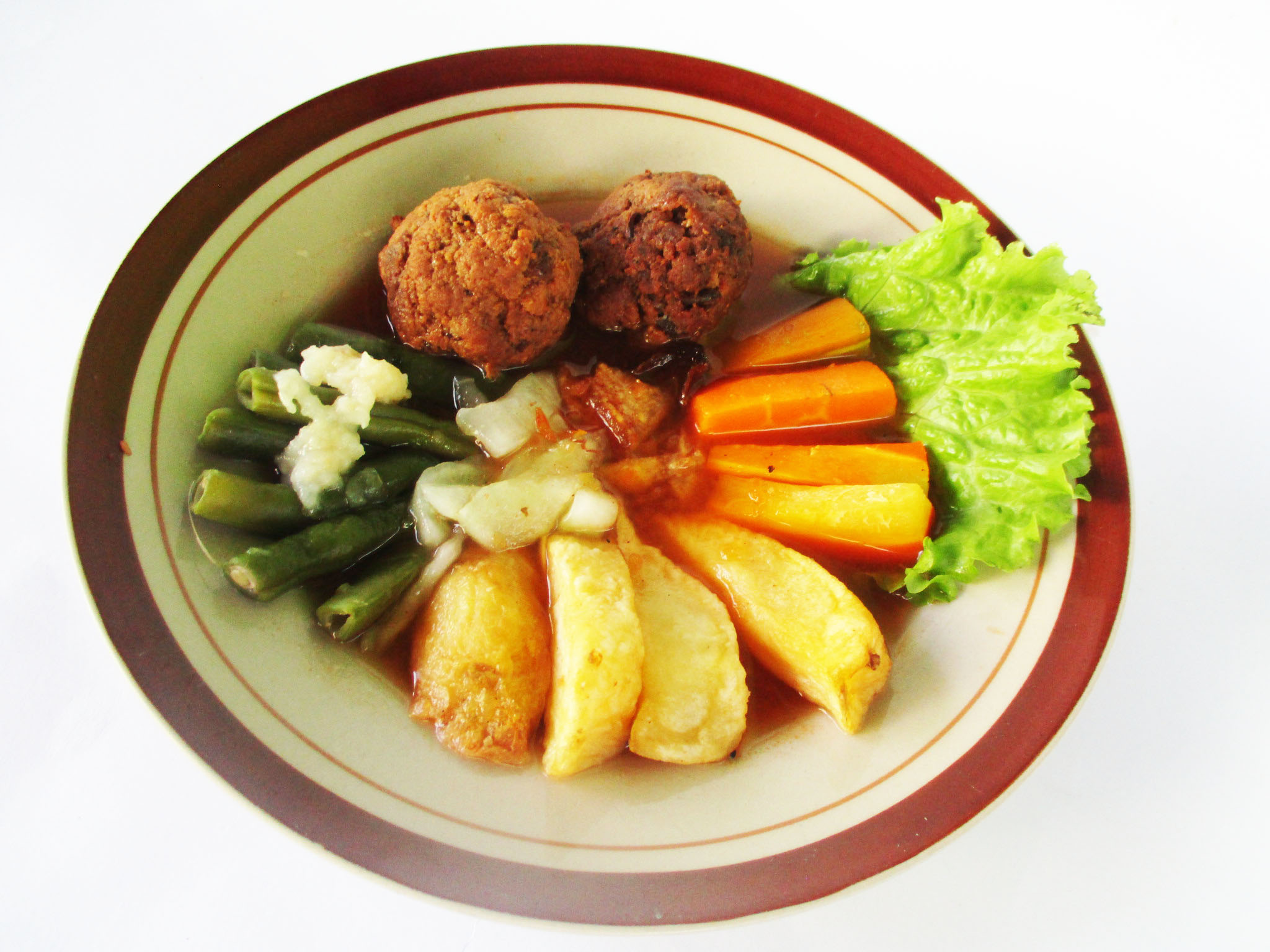
selat solo

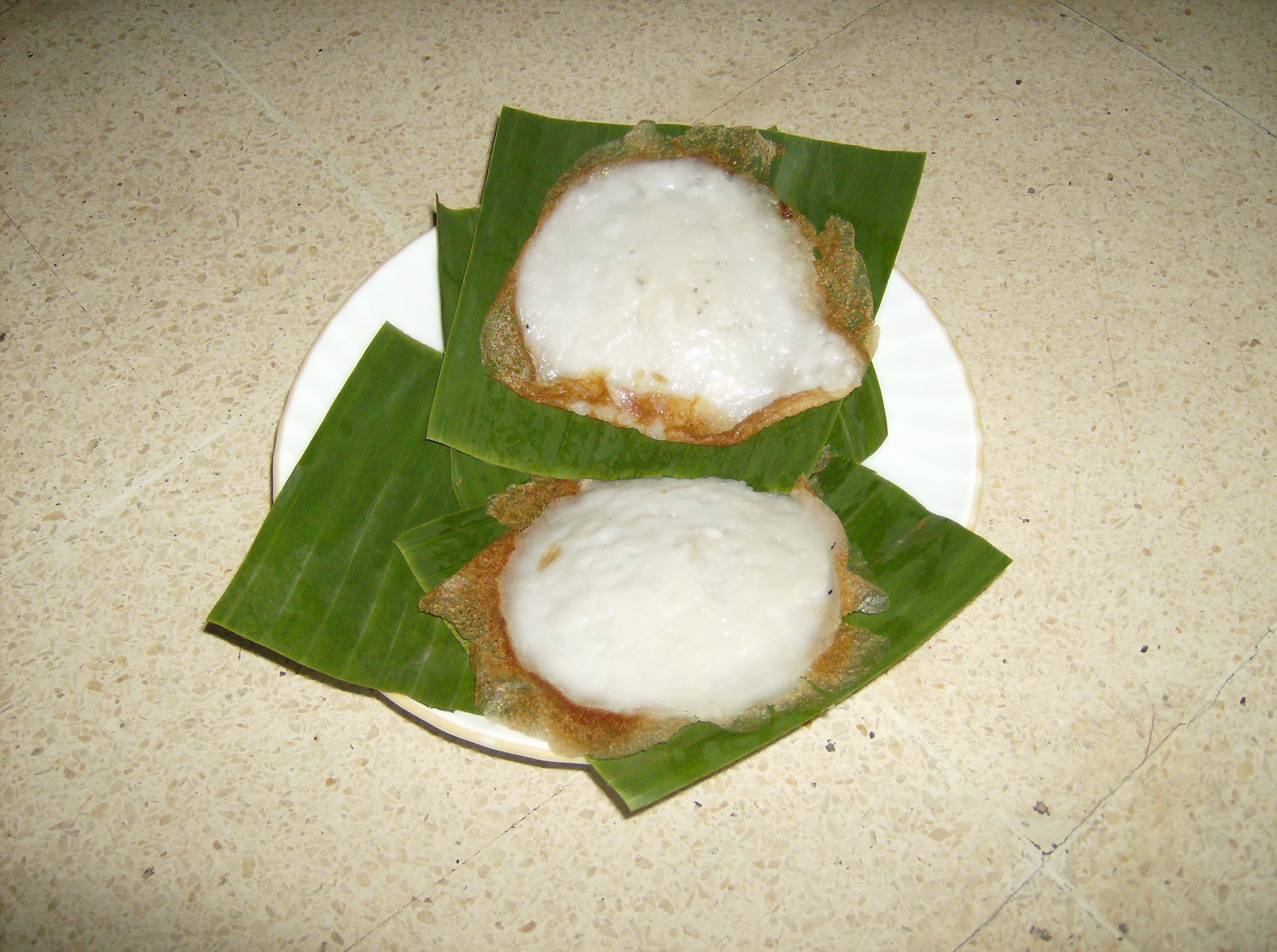
srabi

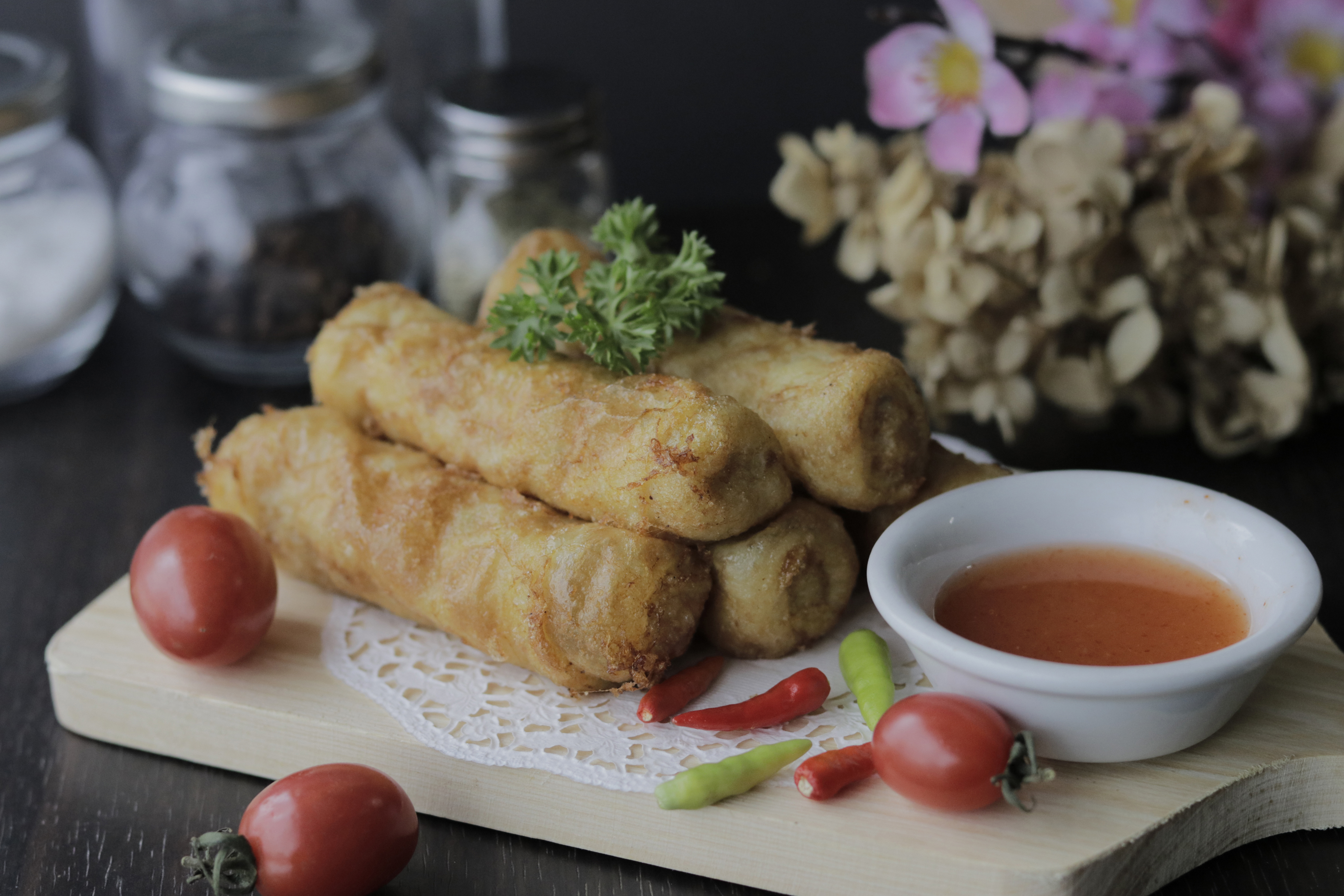
sosis solo

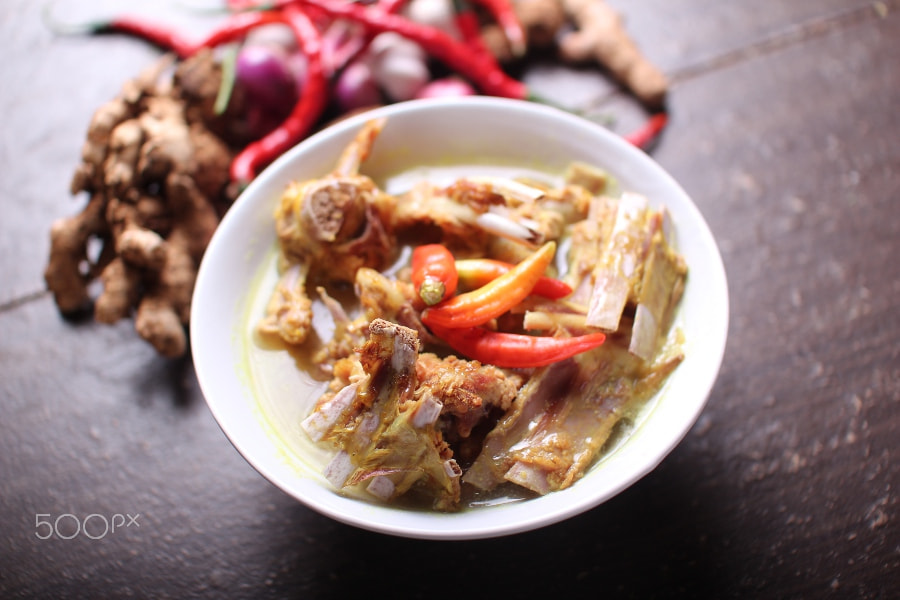
tengkleng

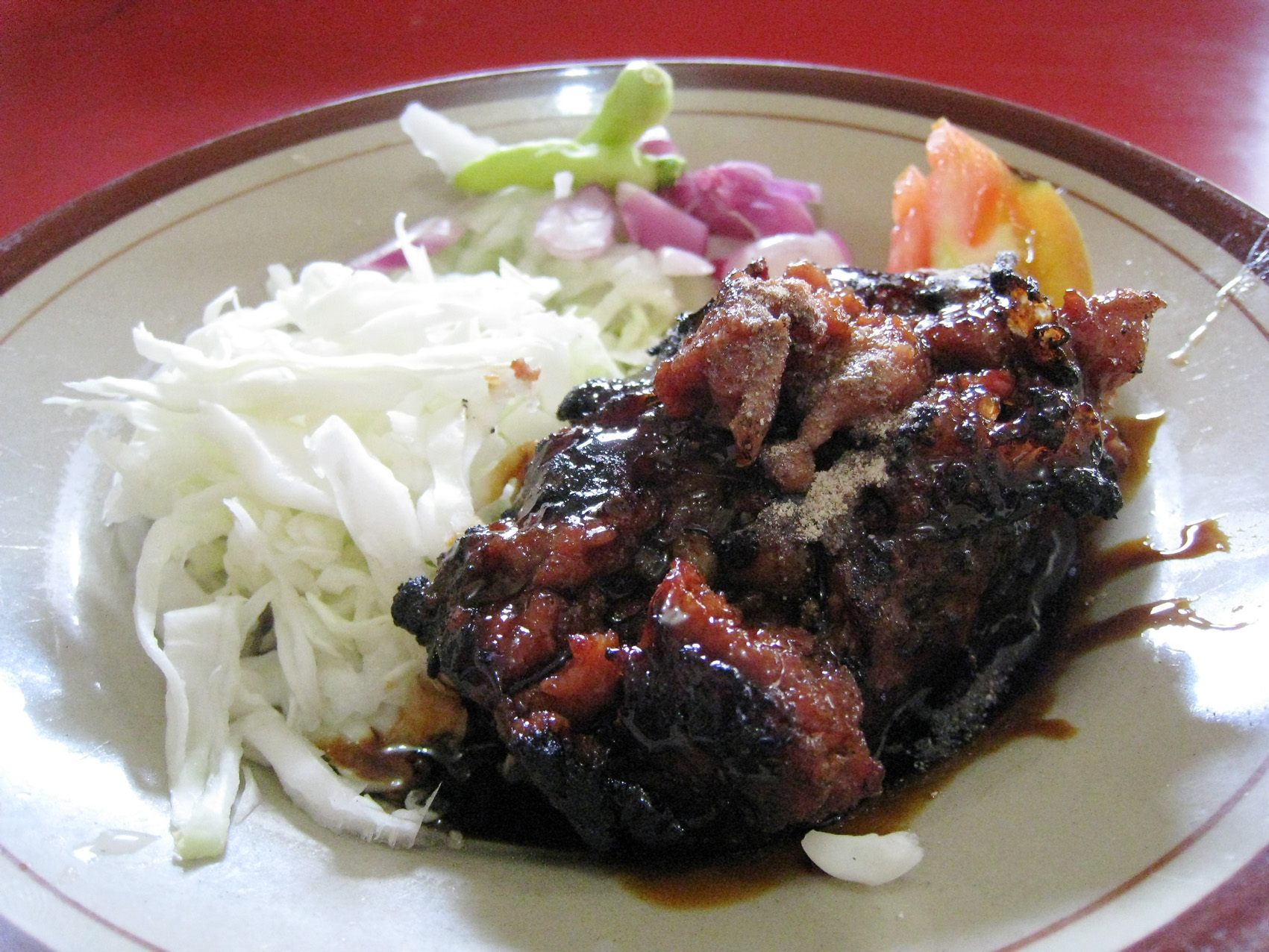
sate buntel

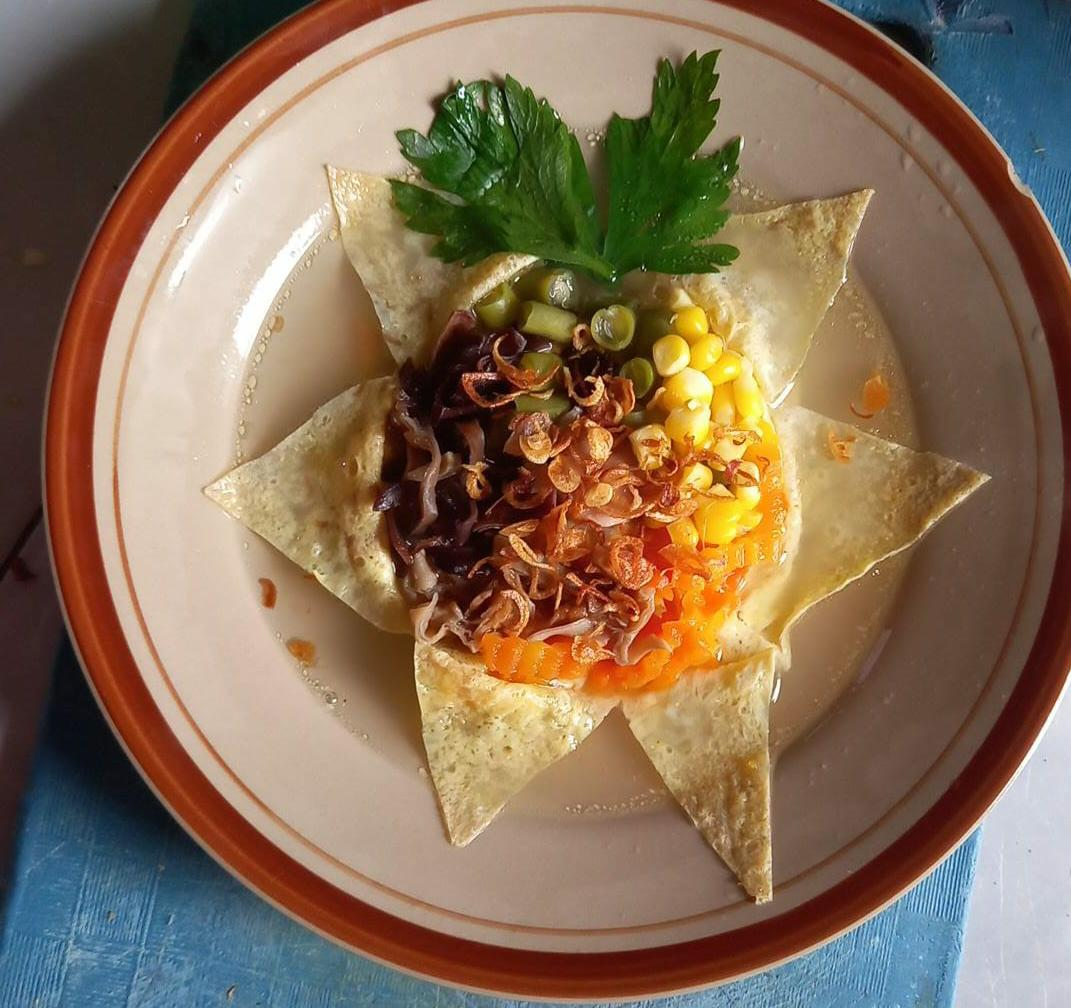
sup matahari

Surakarta is famous for its traditional culinary delights. Some notable dishes include nasi liwet, timlo, bistik solo, selat solo, srabi, intip, tengkleng, sosis solo, sate buntel, sate kere, sup matahari, and many others. Famous beverages include: wedang asle is a warm drink with sticky rice, wedang dawet gempol pleret (gempol is made from a type of rice flour, while pleret is made from sticky rice and palm sugar), and jamu beras kencur, a health drink that differs from other jamu because of its sweet taste, etc.

The rich culinary traditions of Surakarta can be traced back to the keplek ilat tradition (pampering the tongue), a concept originating from the reign of Susuhunan Pakubuwana II. The close relationship between Pakubuwana II and the VOC led to the rapid development of Surakarta's cuisine, making it highly adaptive to culinary styles from abroad, such as European, Chinese, and Arab cuisines.

=== Popular culture ===
The Bengawan Solo River inspired a song composed by Gesang in the 1940s. The song gained popularity in Asian countries. The river has also been the title of three films: two films titled "Bengawan Solo" (1949 and 1971) and a film titled "Di Tepi Bengawan Solo" (1951). Other films centered around Surakarta include "Putri Solo" (1953) and "Bermalam di Solo' (1962).

== Sports ==
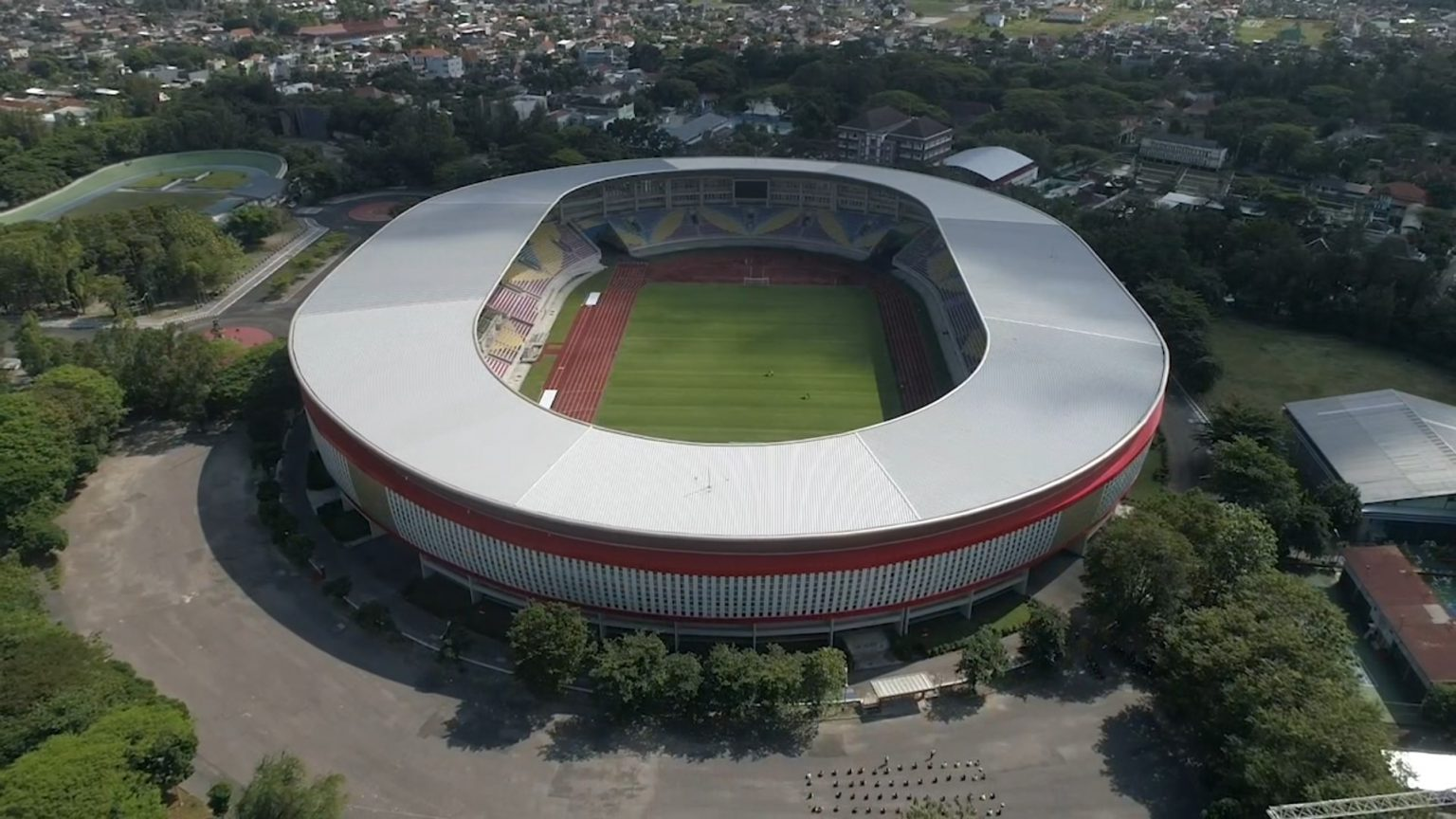
Manahan Stadium in 2022

Surakarta has a long sport history and tradition. In 1923 Solo already had a football club, one of the earliest clubs in Indonesia (at that time still the Dutch Indies), called Persis Solo. Persis Solo was a giant club in the Dutch Indies and still exists, but is past its heyday. During the Perserikatan tournament, Persis became seven-time champion. Currently it plays in the Liga 1 Indonesia. Other than Persis, several clubs have existed in Solo: Arseto, Pelita Solo, Persijatim Solo FC, and lastly Solo FC played in the Indonesian Premier League in 2011. Persis s made Manahan Stadium their home ground. Manahan Stadium is one of the best sports stadiums in Central Java, with 20,000 seats, and has several times hosted national and international matches. It was recently the venue for the AFC Champions Cup 2007, the final venue of the Indonesian Cup 2010, and the opening venue for the Indonesian Premiere League on January 15, 2011.

Surakarta is also home to the West Bandits Solo of the Indonesian Basketball League. They play their home games in the Sritex Arena.

=== Disabled sports ===
Surakarta is the first to host National Paralympic Week in 1957 and hosted several of the subsequent games. As a result, Surakarta has sport facilities sufficient for holding international disabled sports games.

In 1986, Surakarta hosted the 4th FESPIC Games, making the games the first in Indonesian para-sport history in which international disabled sports games were held. The city is also the host city of the 2011 ASEAN Para Games, instead of Jakarta and Palembang, where the main games were held, as well as the 2022 ASEAN Para Games where the original host, Vietnam, only held the 2021 Southeast Asian Games due to the COVID-19 pandemic.

== Transportation ==
Surakarta is strategically located at the intersection of the southern Java route and the Semarang-Surakarta route, making it a vital transit city. The city is also a railway hub where the northern and southern Java railway lines converge. The city is traversed by National Route 15, which connects Surabaya and Yogyakarta, as well as the Trans-Java Toll Road network, linking Surakarta with Jakarta, Semarang, and Surabaya. Additionally, there are provincial roads connecting Surakarta with other cities in Central and East Java. Since Surakarta is a landlocked city, it does not have water transportation.

=== Air ===
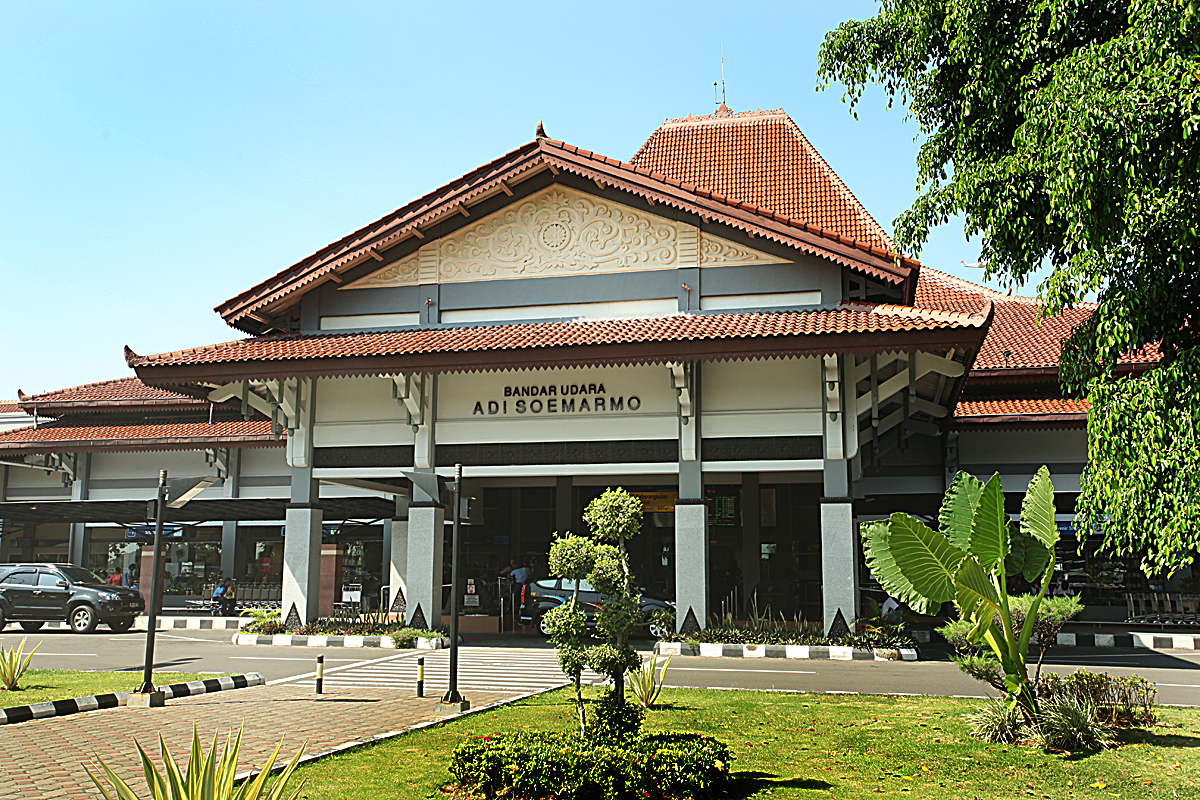
Adi Sumarmo International Airport.

Adisumarmo International Airport (IATA code: SOC) has direct flights to Kuala Lumpur by Malaysia Airlines and during the hajj season, Saudi Arabia, as well as regular flights to Jakarta by Garuda Indonesia, Sriwijaya Air, Lion Air and Citilink. The airport is located 14 km (8.7 mi) north of the city. In 2009 Adisumarmo had 2,060 outbound domestic flights and 616 outbound international flights.

=== Rail ===
Surakarta has four train stations: Solo Balapan, Purwosari, Solo Jebres, and Solo Kota (Sangkrah). Solo Balapan is the largest station in Surakarta, and is the junction between Yogyakarta (westward), Semarang (northward), and Surabaya (eastward), while Purwosari is the junction located west of Solo Balapan, and has a connection to Wonogiri (southward). There are several direct lines to other cities, such as Jakarta, Bandung, Surabaya, Semarang, Ngawi and Malang. For regional traffic, a commuter train KRL Commuterline Yogyakarta–Solo connects Surakarta and Yogyakarta.

On July 26, 2011, the Bathara Kresna Rail Bus has been launched to serve Purwosari– Wonogiri route, but for the moment only Purwosari-Sukoharjo trackage was ready due to there are 99 bridges should be strengthen between Sukoharjo-Wonogiri. Until April 2012, Surakarta-Wonogiri railbus is still in a big question mark due to the 12 tons railbuses are considered too heavy for existing railroad track that only has the capacity of accommodating 10-ton vehicles, furthermore PT KAI have proposed a fare between Rp30,000 ($3.27) and Rp40,000 ($4.36) per passenger, while Surakarta administration wants tickets to be priced much lower between Rp5,000 ($0.54) and Rp7,000 ($0.76).

In 2019, Adisumarmo Airport Rail Link began operation, linking Solo Balapan Station to a station inside Adisumarmo International Airport complex.

=== Road ===
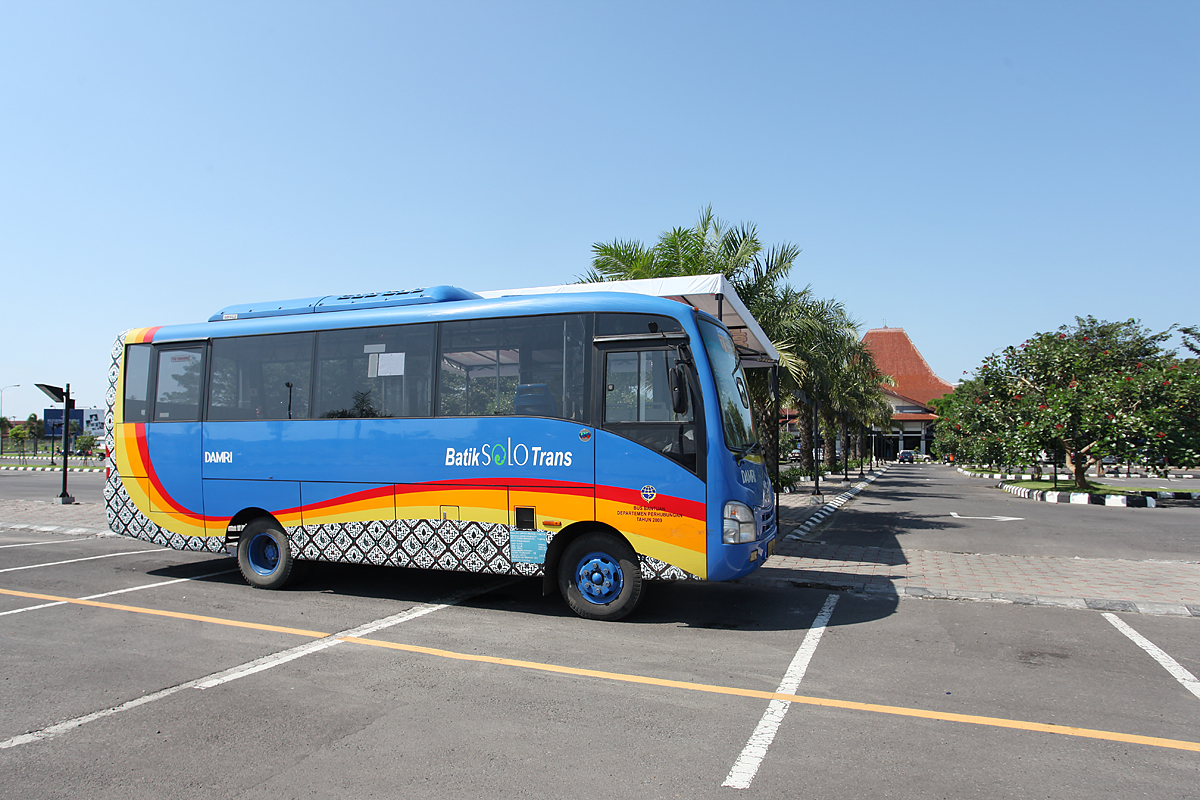
Batik Solo Trans.

Tirtonadi Terminal is the largest bus terminal in Surakarta. Surakarta is situated on Indonesian National Route 15, which connects it to Yogyakarta and Waru (Sidoarjo). Semarang–Solo Toll Road connects the city with provincial capital Semarang. In 2009 the total extent of roadways in the city was 705.34 km: 13.15 km state road, 16.33 km province road, and 675.86 km local road. The number of bus companies was 23, and the total number of buses operating was 1,115 intra-provincial buses and 1,107 inter-provincial.

In 2010, the government of Surakarta launched a new bus service named Batik Solo Trans (BST), a public bus transit system consisting of both bus rapid transit (BRT) corridors and feeder services, which resembles TransJakarta bus rapid transit service. As of 2026, it operates ten routes, connecting various parts of the city, including Adisoemarmo International Airport, major transport hubs, commercial districts, and residential areas. A single trip costs Rp4,000, with a reduced fare of Rp2,200 for students, while persons with disabilities travel free of charge.

== Tourism ==
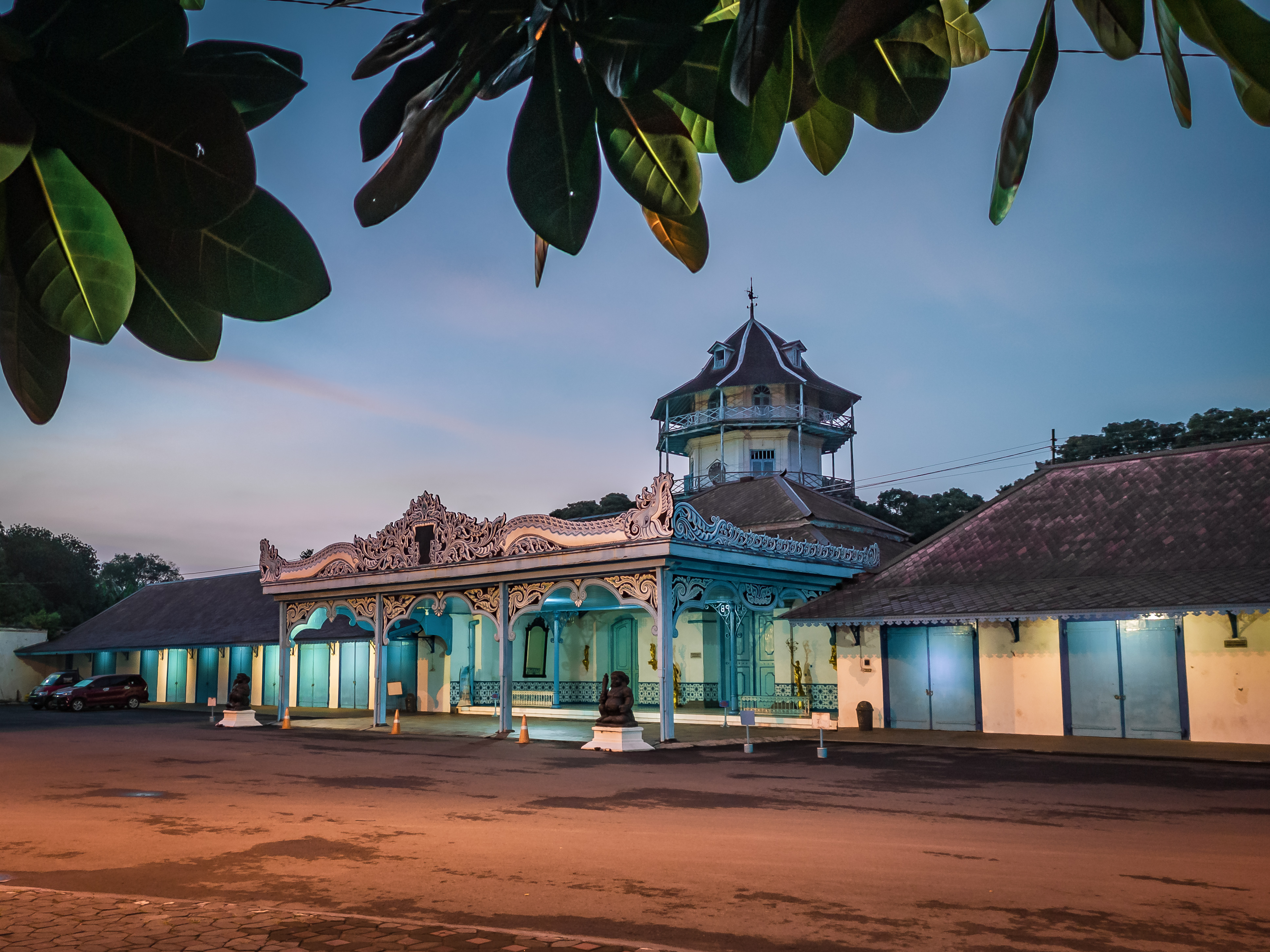
The Kasunanan Surakarta Hadiningrat Palace, which still stands firmly in the city of Surakarta, Central Java, not only serves as the residence of the King but is also used as a museum. This museum is open and accessible to the general public.

Surakarta is known as a popular tourist destination, frequently visited by tourists from major cities. Tourists who vacation in Yogyakarta often make a stop in Surakarta, or vice versa. The main tourist attractions in the city include the Surakarta Palace (Kraton Surakarta), Pura Mangkunegaran, and the batik villages and traditional markets. There is also a historical site called De Tjolomadoe, a former sugar factory located in Colomadu, Karanganyar.

Surakarta has several designated citywalk areas for pedestrians and cyclists, including the Ngarsopuro Corridor, along Slamet Riyadi Street (stretching 6–7 km with a width of 3 meters), and along Perintis Kemerdekaan Street. Motor vehicles are prohibited from passing through these citywalks.

=== Sepur Kluthuk Jaladara ===
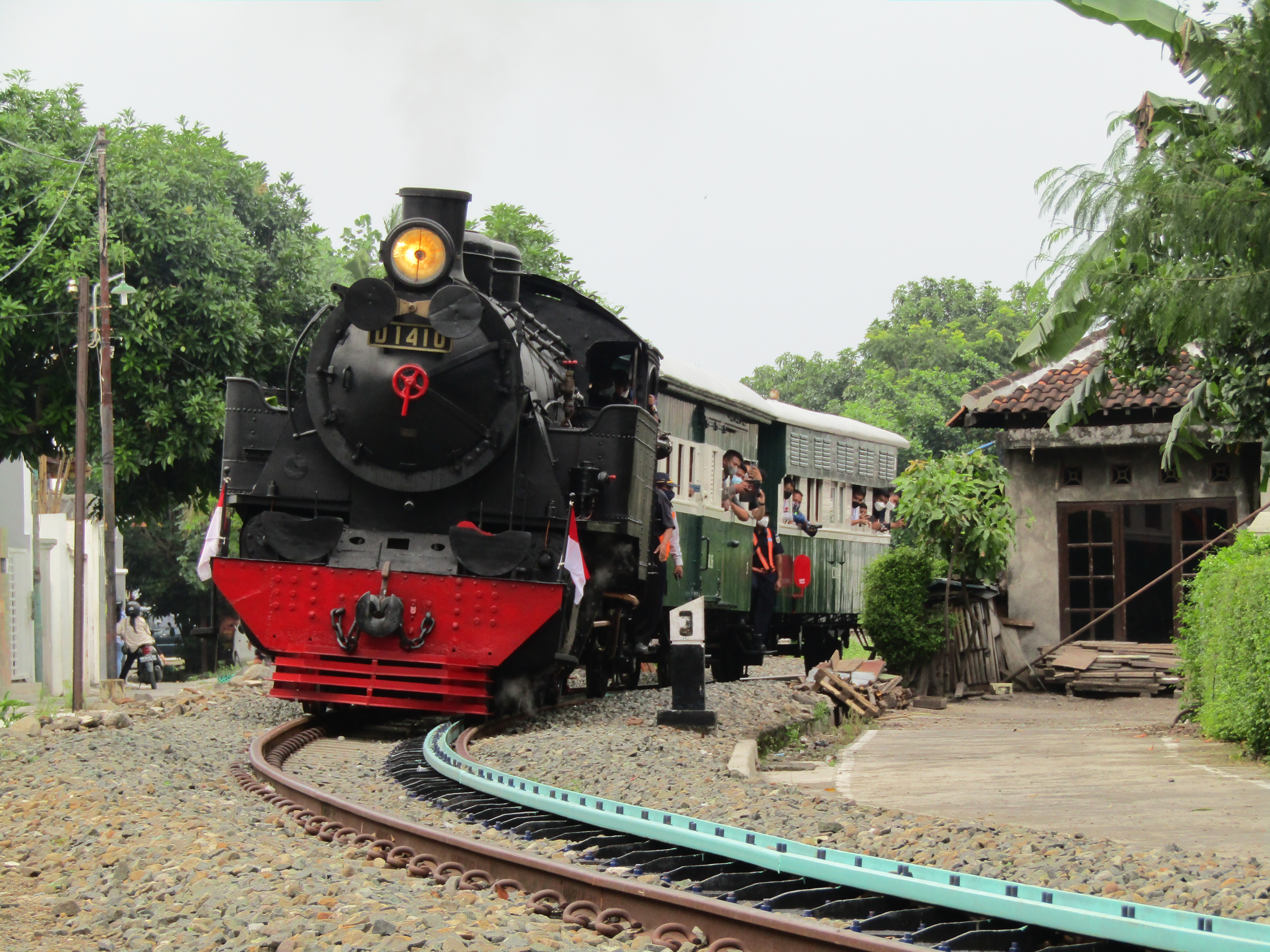
Sepur kluthuk Jaladara

The Jaladara Steam Train, known as Sepur Kluthuk Jaladara in Javanese, is operated in collaboration between Kereta Api Indonesia (Persero) and the Surakarta City Government. This train is a popular tourist attraction in Surakarta, particularly due to the route it follows.

The train operates on the Purwosari–Wonogiri–Baturetno line, specifically the Purwosari-Solo Kota section, where the tracks run alongside Slamet Riyadi Street. With a set of two or three passenger cars pulled by a C12 or D14 and D52 steam locomotive, tourists can view significant sites along Slamet Riyadi Street, such as the Surakarta Palace, Loji Gandrung (the official residence of the Mayor of Surakarta), Ngarsopuro area, and Gladak.

=== Nature tourism ===
Natural attractions near Surakarta include the Tawangmangu Tourism Area (located in Karanganyar Regency), Selo Tourism Area (in Boyolali Regency), Umbul Ponggok and Umbul Manten in Klaten Regency, Kemuning Tea Plantation, Jumog Waterfall, Parang Ijo Waterfall, Segoro Gunung Waterfall, and Grojogan Sewu Waterfall. Additionally, in the slopes of Mount Lawu in Karanganyar, there are several ancient Hindu-Buddhist temples, such as Sukuh Temple, Cetho Temple, and Monkey Temple. Other significant temples in the region include Plaosan and Sewu Temple in Klaten Regency.

=== Festivals and Celebrations ===
Every year, on specific dates, the Surakarta Palace and Pura Mangkunegaran hold various celebrations based on the Javanese calendar.

==== Kirab Pusaka Malam 1 Sura ====
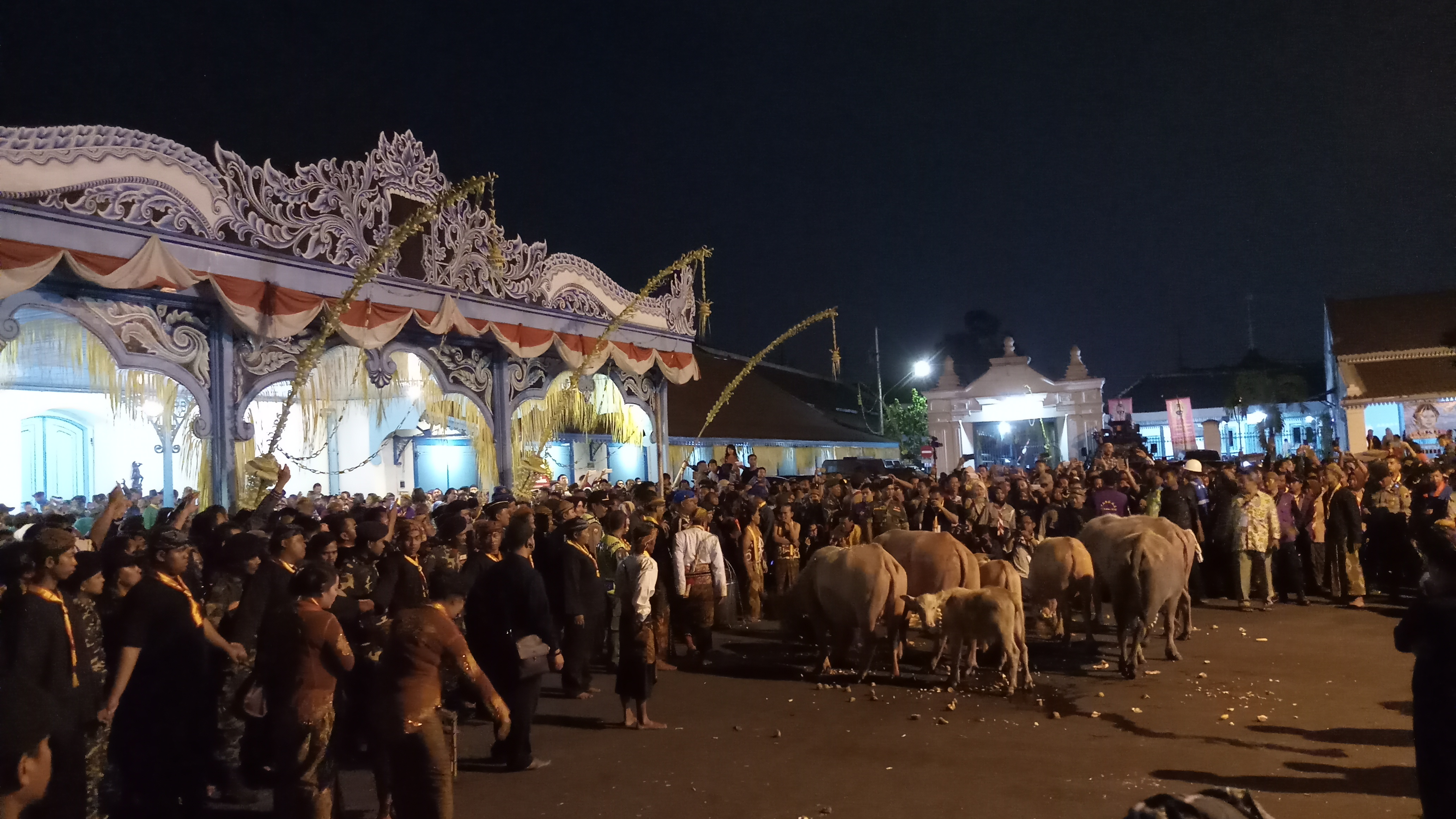
Kebo bule always attract attention during the 1 Suro night parade at the Keraton Surakarta. The beloved animals of Susuhunan Pakubuwana are paraded around the palace every year during the 1 Sura or 1 Muharram procession.

This event is held by the Surakarta Palace and Pura Mangkunegaran on the night before 1 Sura, the Javanese New Year. The procession route is approximately 3 km long, passing through Surakarta Palace–Northern Square–Gladak–Mayor Kusmanto Street–Kapten Mulyadi Street–Veteran Street–Yos Sudarso Street–Slamet Riyadi Street–Gladak, and then returning to the Palace.

In the procession, sacred heirlooms with mystical power are carried by abdi dalem (royal servants) dressed in Jawi Jangkep (traditional Javanese attire). At the front of the procession is a group of albino buffalos (Kebo Bule), descendants of the sacred buffalo Kyai Slamet, followed by the heirloom carriers.

==== Sekaten ====
Sekaten is held annually in the month of Mulud (Rabi' al-Awwal) to commemorate the birth of the Islamic prophet Muhammad. On the 12th of Mulud, a procession called Grebeg Mulud is held, followed by a two-week festival in the Northern Square. During this period, a night market, children's playground, and art performances are held. On the final day, another procession called Grebeg is conducted in the Northern Square. The Sekaten ceremony was first held during the reign of the Demak Sultanate.

==== Grebeg Sudira ====
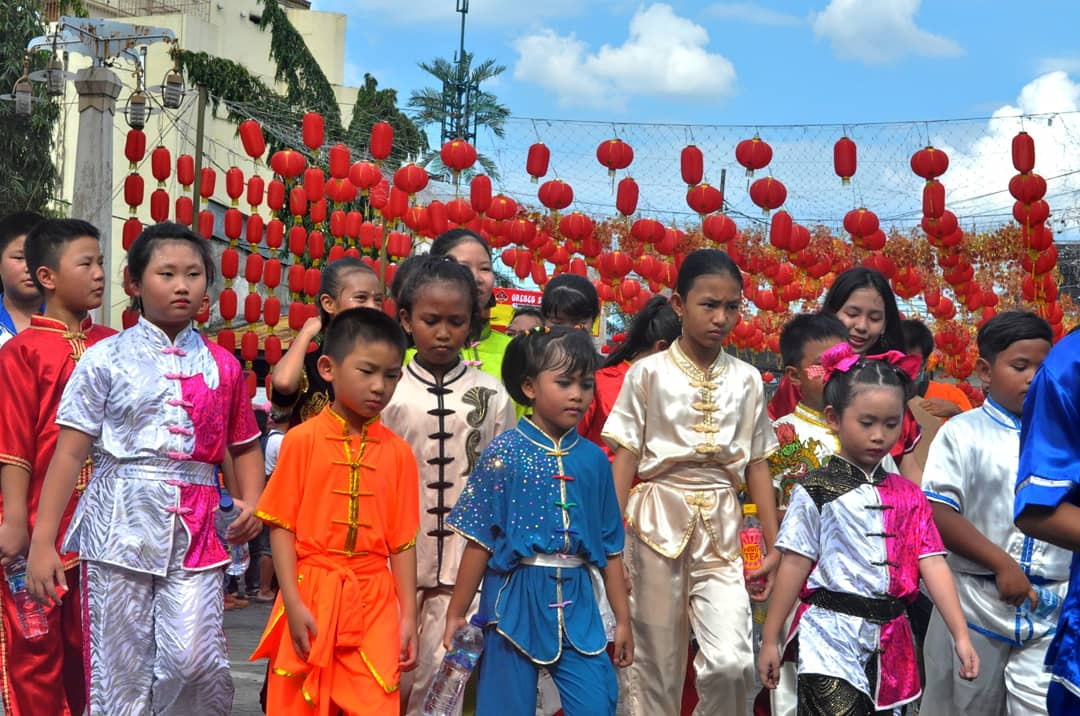
Grebeg Sudiro, 2020

Grebeg Sudiro is held to celebrate the Chinese New Year (Imlek) with a blend of Chinese-Javanese culture. This festival, initiated in 2007, is centered around Pasar Gedhe and Balong (in Sudiroprajan) and the Surakarta City Hall.

==== Grebeg Mulud ====
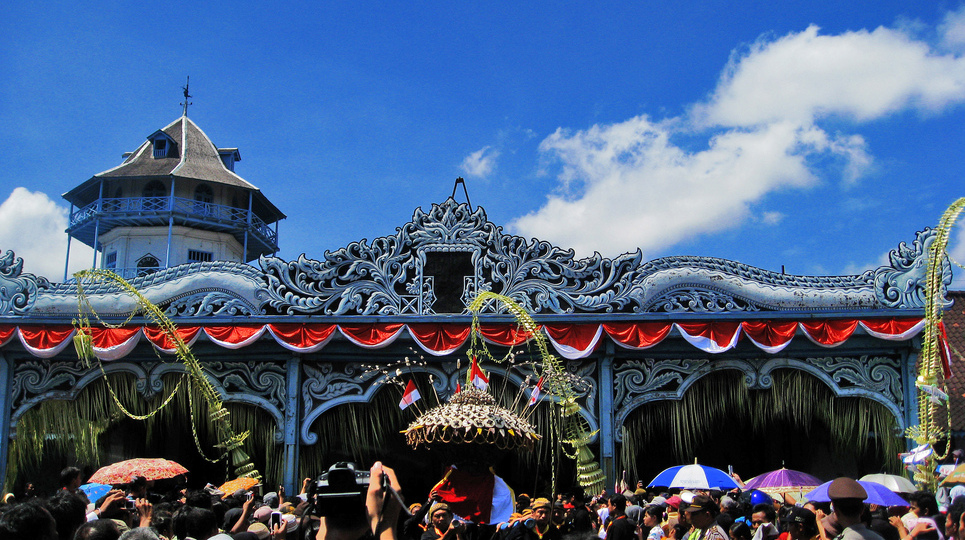
The gunungan procession during Grebeg Mulud at the Keraton Surakarta

Grebeg Mulud is held on the 12th of Mulud to commemorate the Mawlid of Muhammad. It is part of the Sekaten celebration. In this ceremony, abdi dalem in Jawi Jangkep attire carry a gunungan (mountain-shaped offering) from the Keraton Surakarta to the Great Mosque of Surakarta.

The gunungan, made from various vegetables and traditional snacks, is blessed by the palace clergy (ngulamadalem). After the prayer, one gunungan is distributed to the visitors, while another is taken back to the keraton to be shared among the abdi dalem.

==== Tingalan Jumenengan Dalem ====
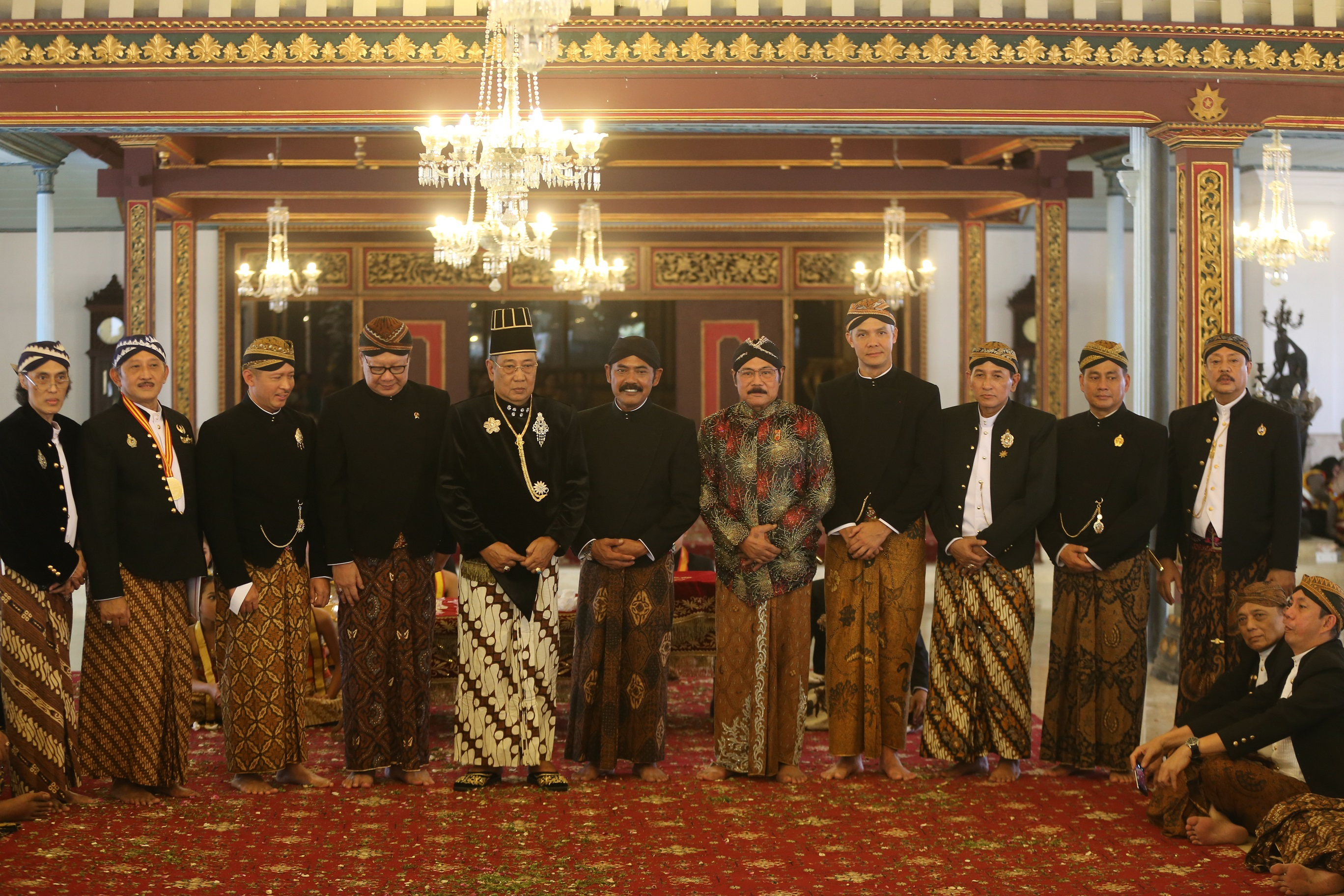
Commemoration of the 13th ascension to the throne of Susuhunan Pakubuwono XIII at Sasana Sewaka Karaton Surakarta

Held annually on the 2nd of Ruwah (Javanese month) to commemorate the anniversary of the coronation of the King of Surakarta (Sri Susuhunan Surakarta). During this event, the king sits on the dampar (throne) in the Pendapa Agung Sasana Sewaka, attended by the royal servants and nobility, while witnessing the sacred dance Bedhaya Ketawang, performed by nine unmarried young women. The dancers are chosen from the royal grandchildren, royal relatives, or general dancers who meet the specific requirements.

==== Grebeg Pasa ====
This ceremony is held to welcome the Eid al-Fitr on the 1st of Shawwal. The event takes place after the Eid prayer, with a procession similar to the Grebeg Mulud, where royal servants carry a gunungan from the Keraton Surakarta to the Great Mosque of Surakarta, where it is blessed by the palace clergy and then distributed to the visiting public.

==== Syawalan ====
Syawalan is held one day after Eid al-Fitr at Taman Satwataru Jurug, located along the Bengawan Solo River. The highlight of the event is the Larung Gethek Jaka Tingkir, where ketupat (rice cakes wrapped in coconut leaves) are distributed to visitors. Various traditional art performances are also showcased during the event.

==== Solo Batik Carnival ====
Solo Batik Carnival is an annual festival organized by the Surakarta government, using batik as the main material for the costumes. Participants design costumes based on specific themes, wear them, and walk down a catwalk along Slamet Riyadi Street. This carnival has been held every June since 2008.

== Sister cities ==
- Montana, Bulgaria.
- Bilbao, Spain
- Algiers, Algeria

== See also ==
- List of metropolitan areas in Indonesia
- Surakarta metropolitan area
- Transition to the New Order
