= Grebeg Sudiro =

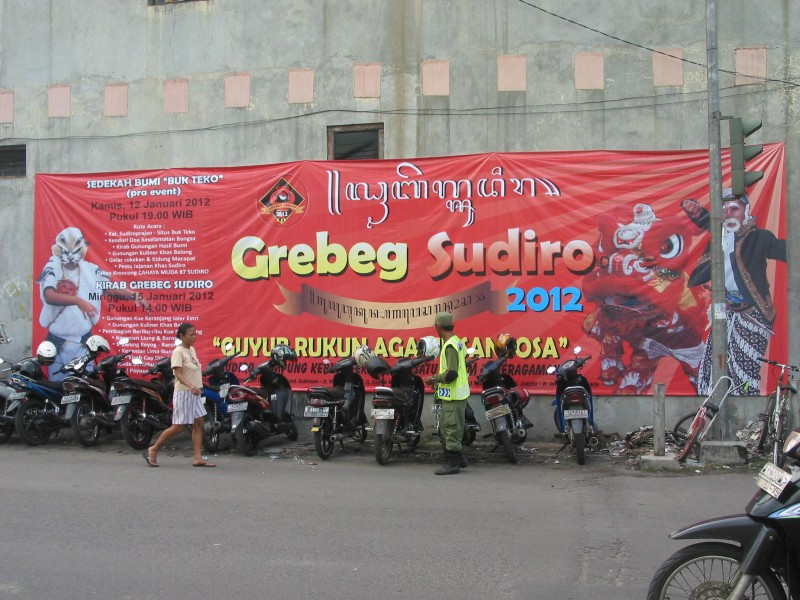
- Grebeg Sudiro 2012
- Genre: Cultural ritual
- Date: Annually at Lunar New Year
- Locations: Sudiroprajan, Surakarta
- Organiser: Chinese Indonesians in Surakarta

Grebeg Sudiro is a festival held in Sudiroprajan, Surakarta that brings together Javanese and Chinese cultural elements. The festival's origins lie in Muslim traditions such as Mawlid, Muharram, Eid al-Fitr, and Eid al-Adha and traditions in the Surakarta Sunanate. The tradition then developed into a local village event held in conjunction with Lunar New Year celebrations centered around the themes of diversity and multiculturalism. People of Chinese, Javanese, and other ethnic groups participate in the Grebeg Sudiro festivities each year. There are a large variety of Chinese ornaments displayed during the festivities and a parade.

== History ==
The idea for the Grebeg Sudiro festivities originated from Oei Bengki, Sarjono Lelono Putro, and Kamajaya, with the approval of the lurah of Sudiroprajan and his staff, who oversee the area. Local cultural figures, community leaders, and NGOs in Surakarta also supported the efforts. Though the festival is relatively new, it draws on elements of tradition and was developed as a means to highlight the cultural uniqueness of the area.

Initially, Grebeg Sudiro was held to commemorate Pasar Gede Hardjonagoro's anniversary. The cultural parade portion of Grebeg Sudiro first occurred on February 3, 2008, with the people of the Sudiroprajan area in attendance. In 2010, the Surakarta city government designated Grebeg Sudiro as an annual event for the city of Surakarta. Each year, Grebeg Sudiro is held with Pasar Gede Hardjonagoro as its center.

== Grebeg Sudiro activities ==
Grebeg Sudiro occurs over the course of Lunar New Year, and includes various events in the Sudiroprajan area such as the creation of a gunungan, a parade, and cultural displays.

Typically, a grebeg-style festival involves the creation of a mountain built out of foodstuffs, known as a gunungan. In the case of Grebeg Sudiro, the gunungan is created from Chinese cakes. It is then carried through the neighborhood as part of a parade.

== Gallery ==
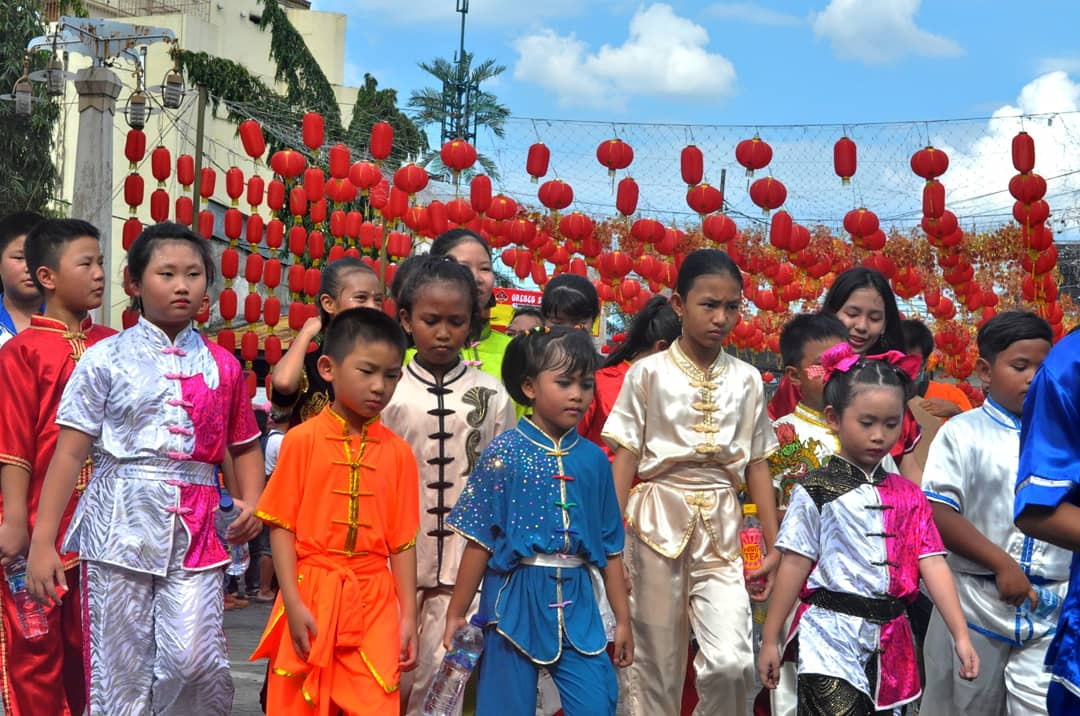
Grebeg Sudiro 2020

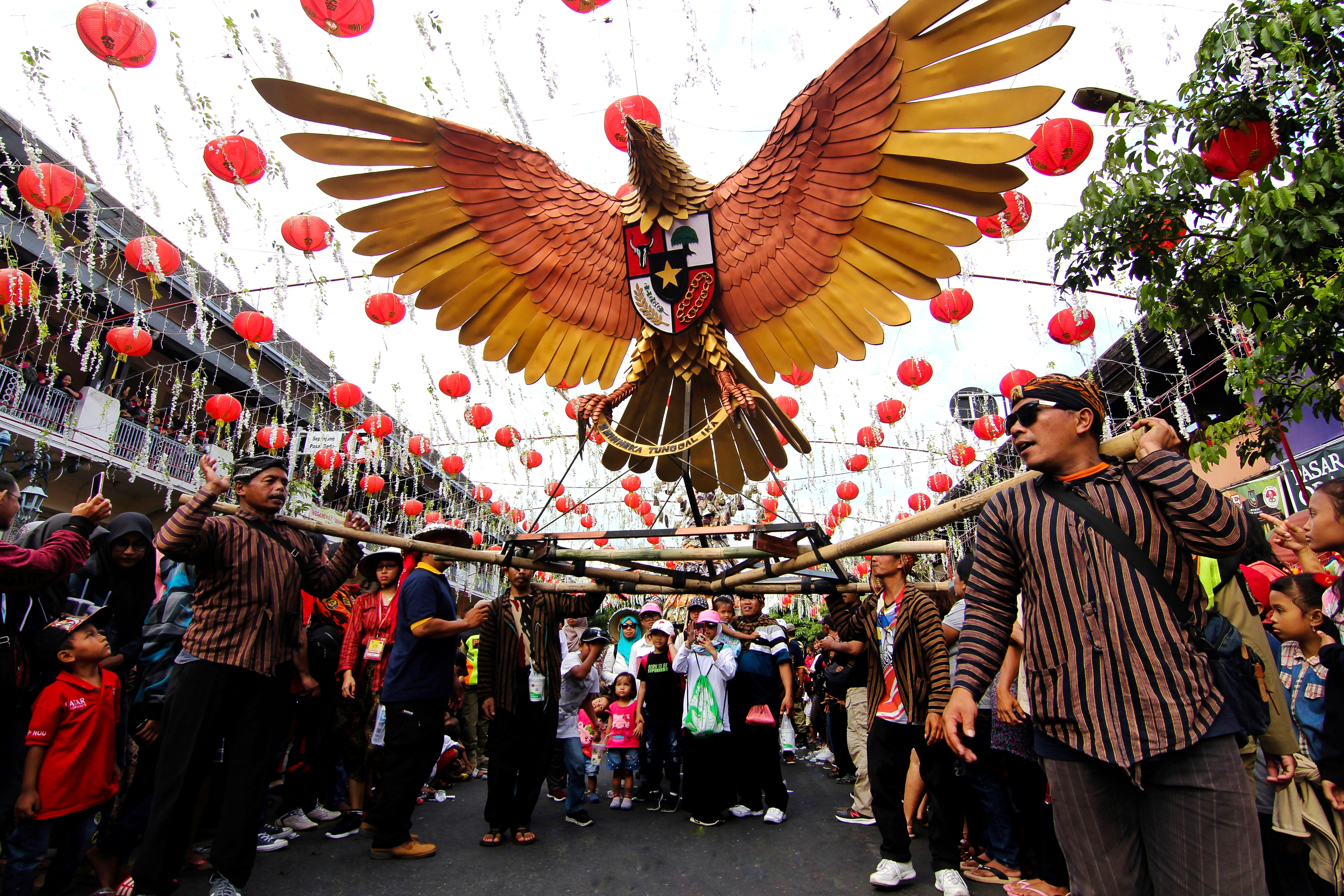
Grebeg Sudiro 2020

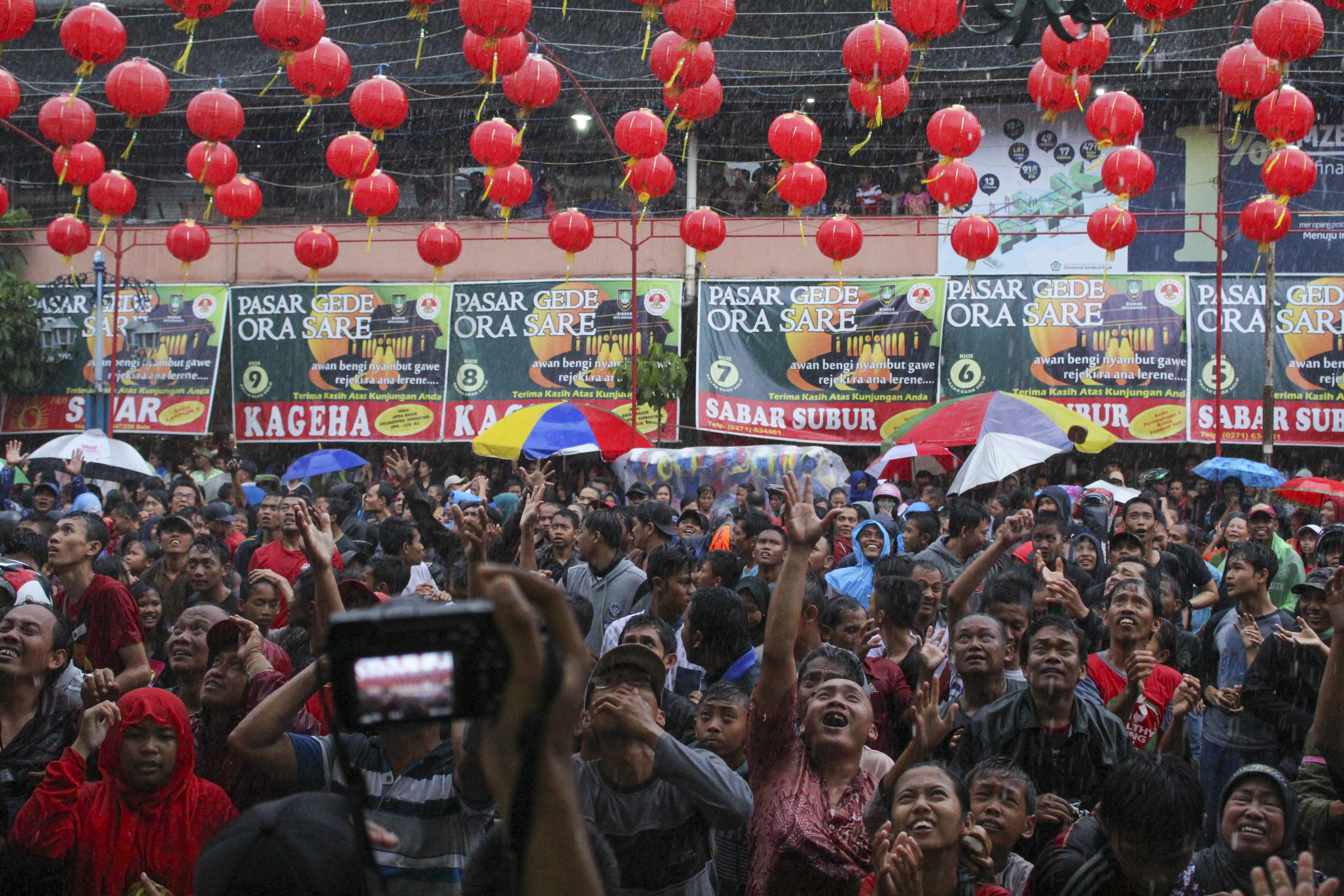
Chinese New Year cakes, Grebeg Sudiro 2018

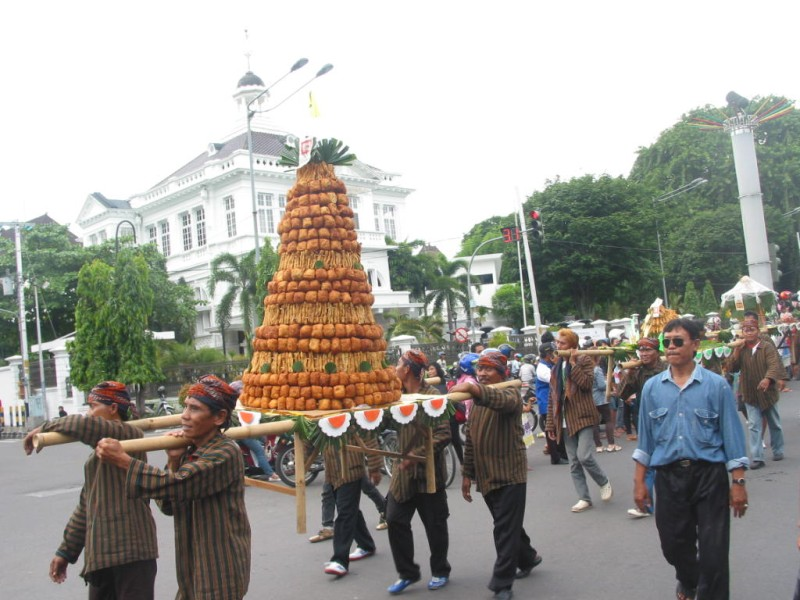
Grebeg Sudiro 2012

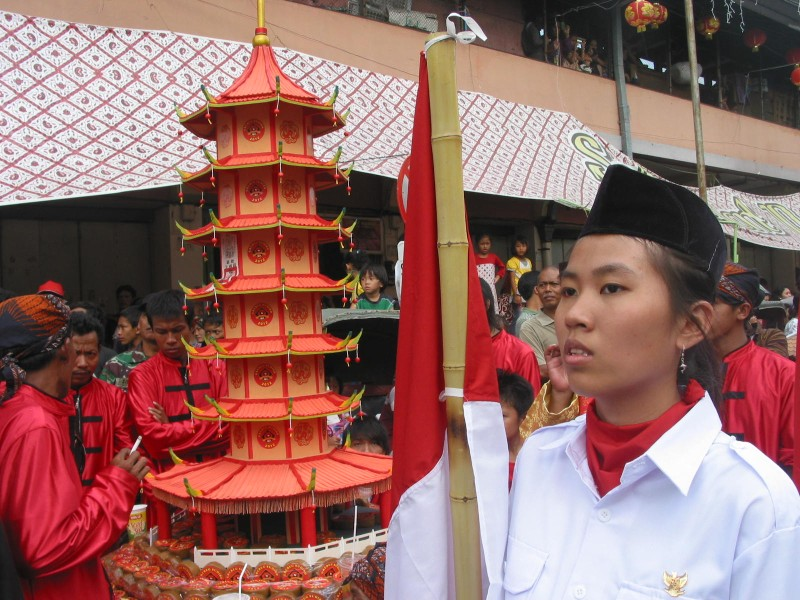
Grebeg Sudiro 2012

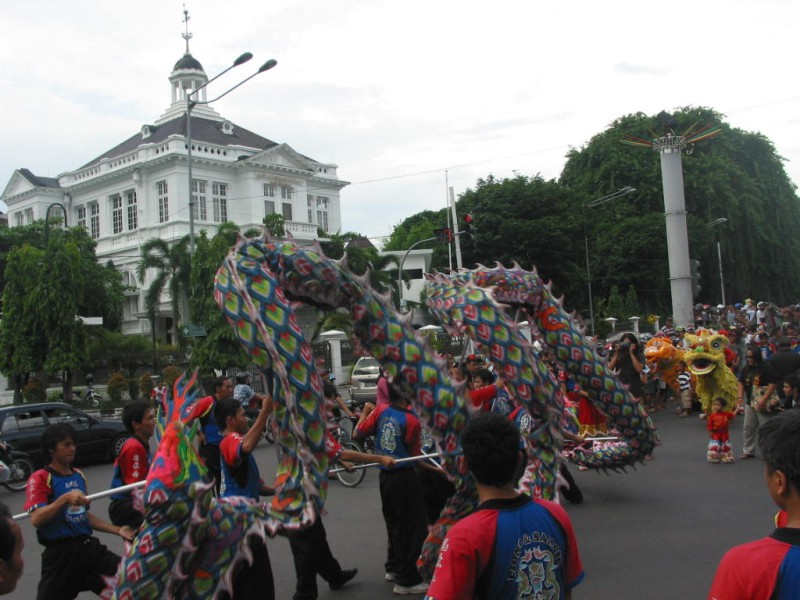
Grebeg Sudiro 2012

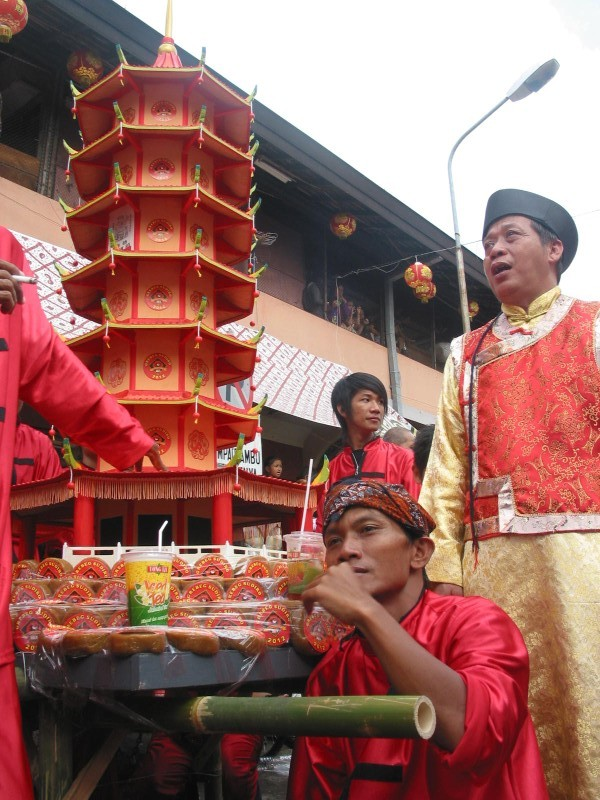
Grebeg Sudiro 2012

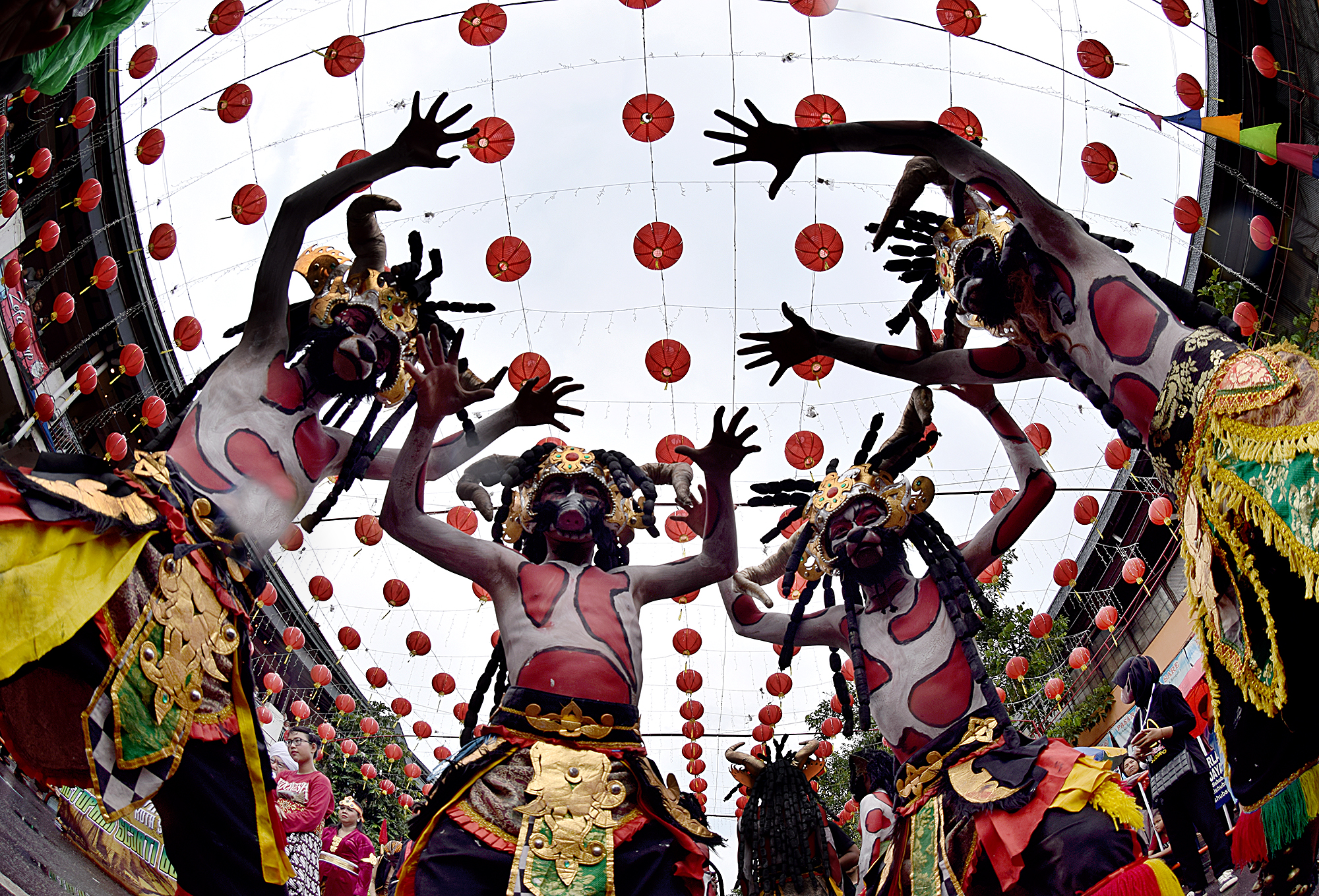
Grebeg Sudiro, 2023
