= Tien Kok Sie Temple =

Temple in Surakarta, Indonesia

Tien Kok Sie
- 梭羅鎮國寺 （So-lô Tìn-kok-sī）
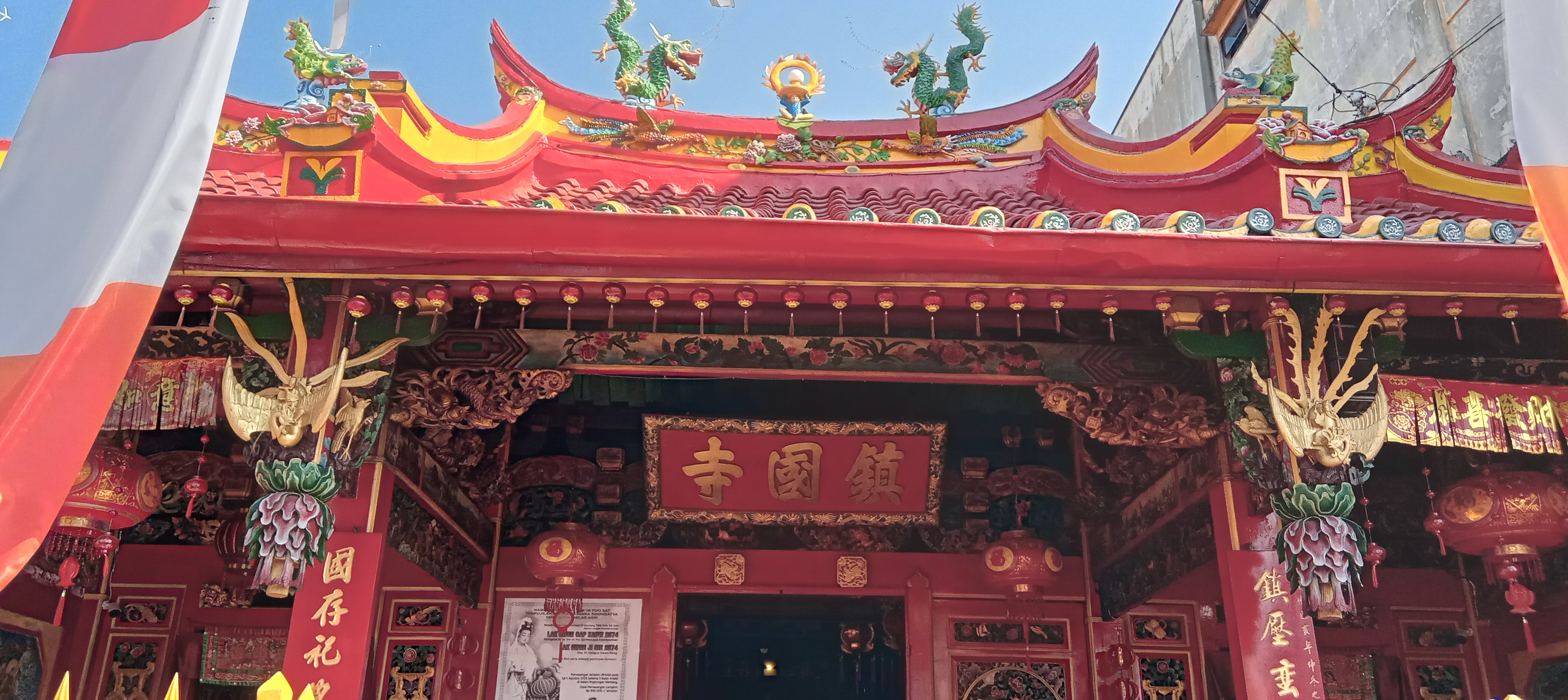
- Tien Kok Sie, Surakarta, 2023

Religion
- Affiliation: Tridharma
- Province: Central Java
- Deity: Guan Yin

Location
- Location: Jl. RE Martadinata No.12, Sudiroprajan, Kec. Jebres, Surakarta, Central Java
- Interactive map of Tien Kok Sie
- Coordinates: 7.56972°S 110.83136°E

Architecture
- Type: Chinese
- Style: Minnan
- Established: 1745

Tien Kok Sie Temple is a Chinese temple in Surakarta, Central Java, Indonesia. Tien Kok Sie Temple is used by practitioners of three religions: Confucianism, Buddhism, and Taoism, though it is currently visited mostly by Buddhists. It is one of the oldest temples in Central Java.

== History ==
When the palace of the Surakarta Sunanate was moved from Kartasura to Surakarta in 1745, the Tien Kok Sie Temple also moved. Construction of the temple in the location where it stands today, to the south of Pasar Gede Hardjonagoro, began in 1745, carried out by the Chinese residents in the Pasar Gede area. The temple was built at an intersection, which according to Chinese belief required a temple to cleanse the area of negative energy. Its establishment also led to a further influx of Chinese residents to the area.

The ownership status of the temple's land is not clear because it stands on ground owned by the Surakarta Sunanate, though the Sunanate originally granted the land to the temple.

The temple's name was changed from Vihara Alokiteswara to Tien Kok Sie Temple as a result of Abdurrahman Wahid's presidency. The name was changed to follow the policy regarding the establishment of Confucianism as an official religion in Indonesia. Since 2007, the temple has also had a hand in the annual Grebeg Sudiro celebrations, which are a melding of Chinese and Javanese traditional practices.

On May 3, 2013, the Indonesian Ministry of Primary and Secondary Education recorded Tien Kok Sie Temple as an Indonesian cultural heritage site. The temple remains in its historic condition without changes to its original architecture.

== Architecture ==
The temple's architecture is Chinese in nature, with carved ornamentation on its windows and doors. There are, however, certain Javanese elements incorporated into the structure of the building, making the temple an example of the adoption of Chinese culture into Surakarta through religious and trade routes.
