= Pasar Gede Hardjonagoro =

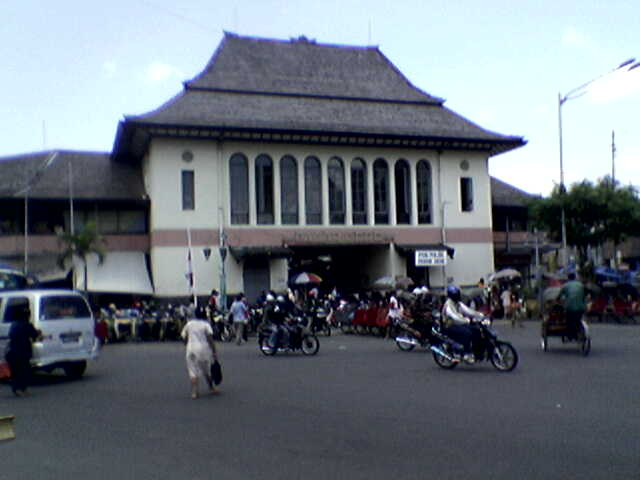
- Pasar Gede Hardjonagoro in 2005
- Address: Jalan Urip Sumoharjo, Sudiroprajan, Jebres, Surakarta
- Architect: Thomas Karsten

Pasar Gede Hardjonagoro (Javanese: ꦥꦱꦂꦒꦼꦝꦺꦲꦂꦗꦤꦒꦫ, translit. Pasar Gedhé Harjanagara) is the largest market in Surakarta, Central Java. Pasar Gede literally means "Big Market" in Javanese.

== History ==
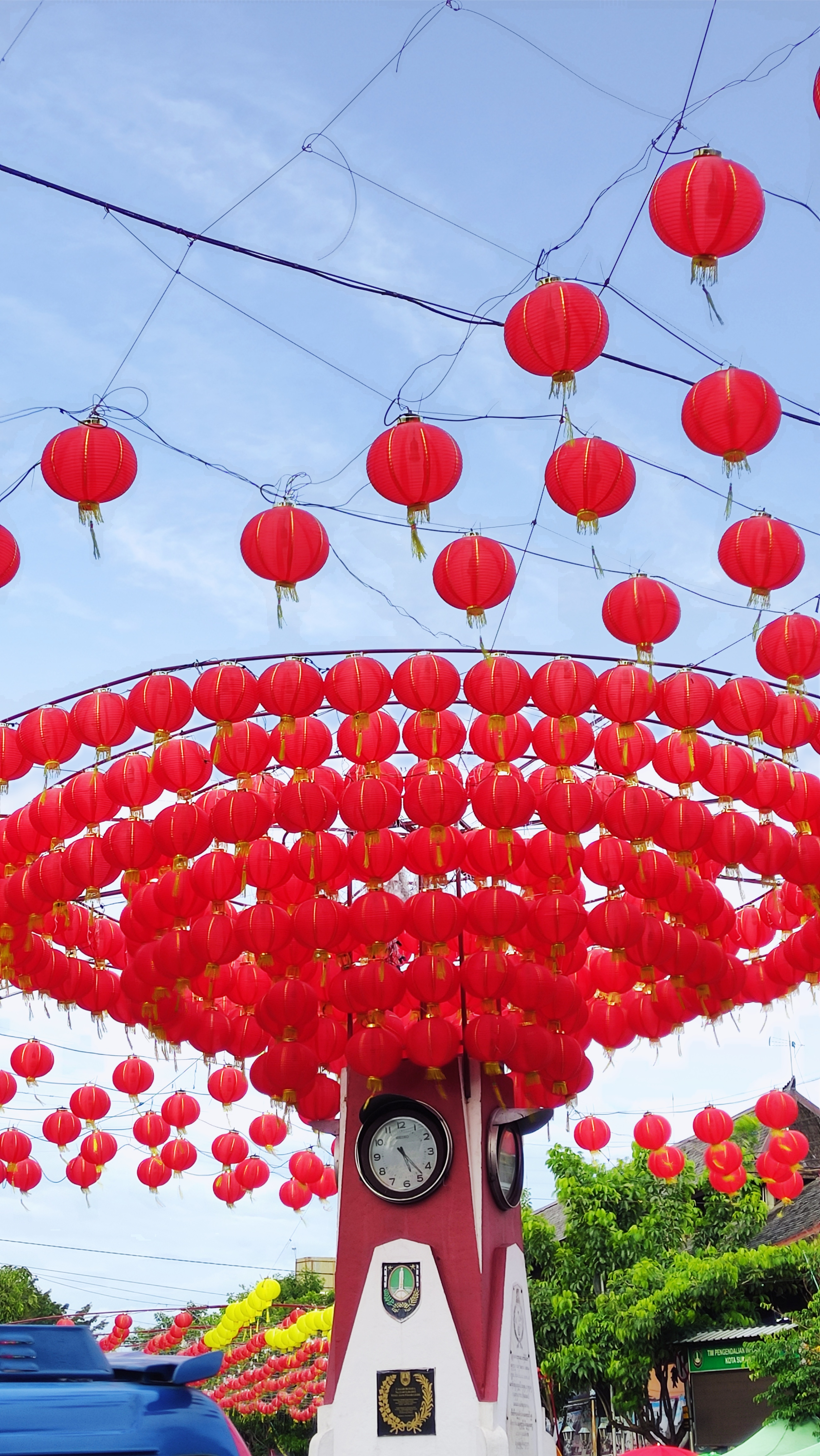
2574 (Chinese year) Lunar New Year celebrations at Pasar Gede Hardjonagoro, Surakarta

A market in the area of Pasar Gede has existed since the establishment of the Kraton Ngayogyakarta Hadiningrat, in 1745. In its early days, it was a small market covering 10.421 hectares, located at the intersection in front of the governor's office, which is now the Balai Kota Surakarta. Construction of a permanent structure for the market began in 1927. On January 12, 1930, during the latter years of the Dutch colonial period, Pasar Gede was officially inaugurated. The building was designed by Dutch architect Thomas Karsten, on the instructions of Pakubuwono X. The market was given the name “pasar gedhé” or “big market” due to its large roof. Over time, this market has become the largest in Surakarta.

Pasar Gede consists of two buildings that are separated by a road now called Jalan Sudirman. Both buildings have two floors. The main building's gate resembles the roof of a palace, hence the name Pasar Gedhé in Javanese.

== Architecture ==
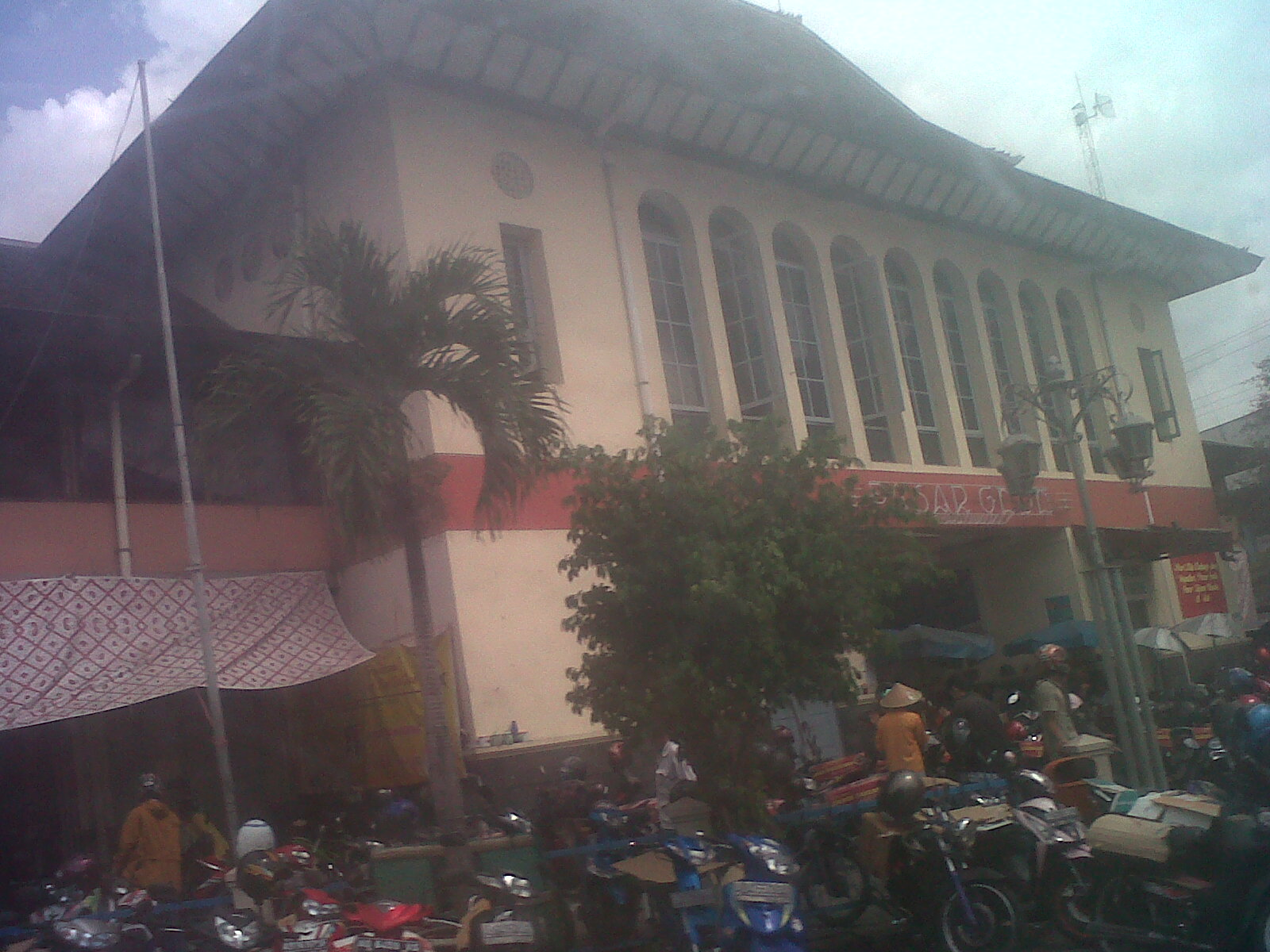
Pasar Gede in 2011.

Pasar Gede's architecture is a blend of Dutch and Javanese styles. Its two-floor design was to allow for a meat and fish market on the second floor so that flies would be less likely to interfere with commerce and to allow airflow. The first floor was also built slightly higher than street level so that goods could easily be rolled out of the market.

In 1948, Pasar Gede was damaged by a Dutch attack. The Indonesian government, which took over the area of Surakarta and the Surakatara Special Region, then renovated the market in 1949, with reconstruction finishing in 1954. Improvements to the roof finished in 1981. The Indonesian government replaced the old roof with a new wooden roof.

The second building at Pasar Gede was once used as a Public Works office. It is now a fruit market.

== Location ==
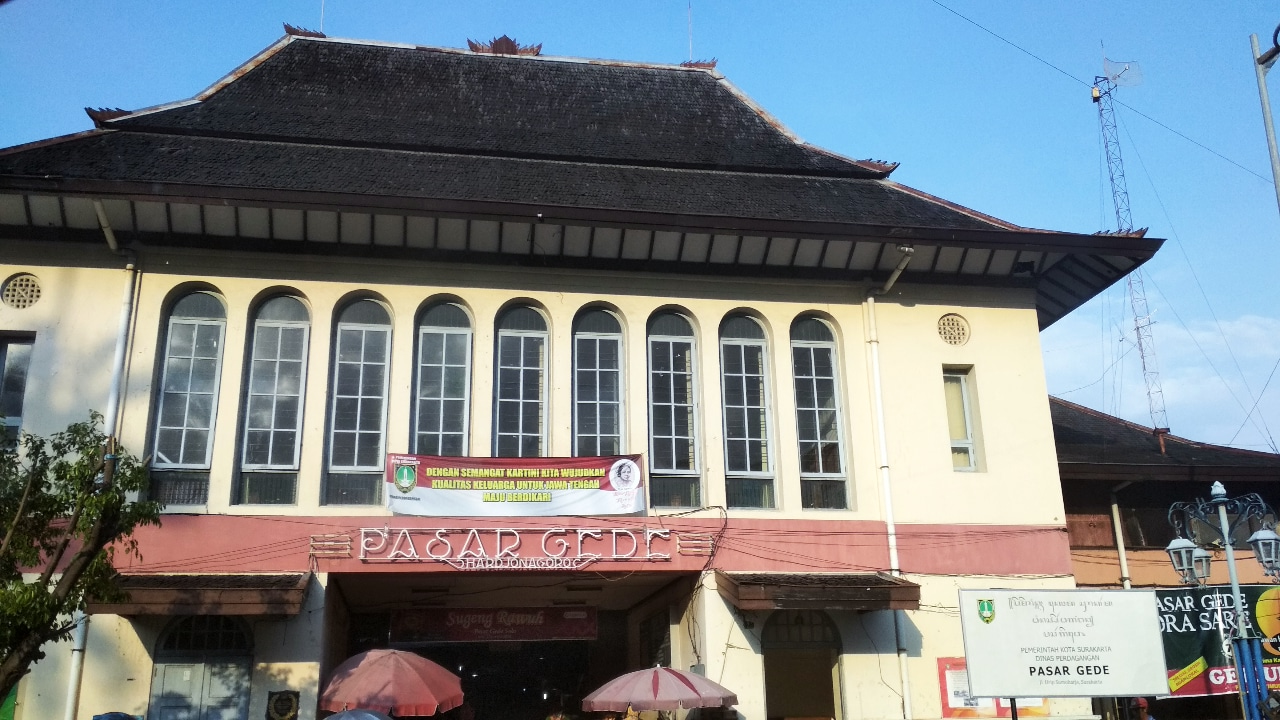
Pasar Gede in 2019.

Pasar Gede is located on Jalan Urip Sumohardjo, across from the Balai Kota Surakarta, at the intersection of the roads that were once called Jalan Ketandan, Jalan Cokronegaran, and Jalan Warungpelem. It is located in the Sudiroprajan kelurahan. Pasar Gede and the area around it make up the Chinatown of Surakarta; many Chinese Indonesians live and work in the area. This is due in part to ethnic segregation by the Dutch.

A well-known Javanese cultural figure from Surakarta, Go Tik Swan, was elevated to noble status by Pakubuwana XII, receiving the title K.R.T. Hardjonagoro because his grandfather was the head of Pasar Gede Hardjonagoro.

Directly to the south of the market is Tien Kok Sie Temple, located on Jalan Ketandan.

== Destruction and Renovation ==
Besides the Dutch attack in 1948, Pasar Gede has also been struck by mobs. Though it did not see damage during the May 1998 riots, in October 1999, when there were more riots due to Megawati Sukarnoputri's loss in the presidential race, Pasar Gede was burned by a mob. Renovation efforts to preserve the original architecture began in 2000 and in 2001 the restored market was open for business again.
