= List of language names =

This article is a resource of the native names of most of the major languages in the world. These are endonymic glossonyms.

== Languages ==
' · A · B · C · D · E · F · G · H · I · J · K · L · M · N · O · P · Q · R · S · T · U · V · W · X · Y · Z · ǀ · ǁ · ǂ

† = Extinct language

=== ' ===
ꞌAreꞌare – Areare

- Spoken in: southern Malaita, Solomon Islands

ʼAuhelawa – Kurada

- Spoken in: Nuakata Island, Milne Bay Province, Papua New Guinea

ʼOle – ʼOlekha

- Spoken in: Bhutan

=== A ===
Aari – አፋን፡ኣሪ፡

- Spoken in: Ethiopia

Aasáx † – Aasá

- Formerly spoken in: Tanzania

Abadi – Abadi

- Spoken in: Central Province, Papua New Guinea

Abau – Abau

- Spoken in: Sandaun Province, Papua New Guinea

Abaza – Aбаза бызшва

- Official language in: Karachay-Cherkessia, Russia

Abellen – Ayta Abellen

- Spoken in: Tarlac, Philippines

Abenaki † – Alnôba, Wôbanakiôdwawôgan

- Formerly spoken by: the American/Canadian Abenaki Tribe

Abidji – Enyembe lɛɛ Ogbru

- Spoken in: Ivory Coast

Abinomn – Avinomen, Foya, Foja

- Spoken in: Mamberamo Raya Regency, Papua, Indonesia

Abkhaz – аԥсшәа/аҧсшәа; аԥсуа бызшәа

- Official language in: Abkhazia
- Recognised Minority Language in: Georgia

Aborlan Tagbanwa – tabanawa

- Spoken in: Palawan, Philippines

Abua – Abuan

- Spoken in: Rivers State, Nigeria

Abui – Abui

- Spoken in: Alor Regency, East Nusa Tenggara, Indonesia

Abun – Abun

- Spoken in: Southwest Papua, Indonesia

Abure – ɔbule ɔyʋɛ

- Spoken in: Ivory Coast

Abureni – Mini

- Spoken in: Bayelsa State, Nigeria

Acatepec Me’phaa – Meꞌpa̱a̱ Wíꞌi̱i̱n

- Spoken in: Guerrero, Mexico

Acehnese – Aceh or Bahsa Acèh

- Spoken in: Aceh, Indonesia

Achagua – Achawa

- Spoken in: Meta Department, Colombia

Achang – Mönghsa, ŋa˨˩ʈʂhaŋ˨˩

- Spoken in: China and Myanmar

Achi – achi'

- Recognised Minority Language in: Guatemala

Acholi – Leb Acholi

- Spoken in: Uganda and South Sudan

Achuar-Shiwiar – Achuár chícham

- Spoken in: Ecuador and Peru

Achumawi † – Achomawi or Ajúmmááwí

- Formerly spoken in: California, United States

Adai † – Tenánat Hadéyas

- Formerly spoken in: Louisiana, United States

Adang – Adang, Alor

- Spoken in: Alor Regency, East Nusa Tenggara, Indonesia

Adangbe – Adangbe

- Spoken in: Togo

Adangme – Adangbɛ

- Official language in: Ghana

Adara – Ànda

- Spoken in: Nigeria

Adele – Gidire

- Spoken in: Ghana and Togo

Adi – Adi, ཨདི

- Spoken in: Arunachal Pradesh, India and Tibet, China

Adioukrou – mɔjukru

- Spoken in: Ivory Coast

Adja – Adja or Ajagbe

- Recognised Minority Language in: Benin

Adnyamathanha – Yura Ngawarla

- Spoken in: South Australia, Australia

Adyghe – Адыгабзэ

- Official language in: Adygea, Russia

Adzera – Adzera

- Spoken in: Morobe Province, Papua New Guinea

Afade – afaë

- Spoken in: Cameroon and Nigeria

Afar – Qafar af

- Official language in: Ethiopia
- Recognised Minority Language in: Djibouti and Eritrea

Afghan Sign Language – زبان اشاره افغانستانی

- Signed in: Afghanistan

Afrihili – El-Afrihili

- Proposed lingua franca of Africa

Afrikaans – Afrikaans

- Official language in: South Africa
- Recognised Minority Language in: Botswana and Namibia

Aghem – aghím

- Spoken in: Cameroon

Aghul – агъул чӀал

- Official language of: Dagestan, Russia

Aguacateco – awakateko

- Spoken in: Guatemala

Aguaruna – Awajún

- Spoken in: Peru

Ahirani – खान्देशी, अहिराणी

- Spoken in: Maharashtra, India

A-Hmao – ad Hmaob lul, A-hmaos

- Spoken in: Guizhou and Yunnan, China

Ahom † – 𑜁𑜪𑜨 𑜄𑜩 𑜒𑜑𑜪𑜨, 𑜁𑜨𑜉𑜫 𑜄𑜩 𑜒𑜑𑜪𑜨

- Formerly spoken in: Assam, India

Ahtna – Atnakenaege

- Official language of: Alaska, United States

Aikanã – Tubarão, Huari

- Spoken in: Rondônia, Brazil

Aimaq – ايماق

- Spoken in: Afghanistan

Ainu – アイヌ イタク, Aynu Itak

- Recognised Minority Language in: Japan

Air Tamajeq – Tayərt, ⵜⵢⵔⵜ, تَایِیرْتْ

- Spoken in: Aïr Mountains, Agadez Region, Niger

Aiton – ဢႝတွꩫ်

- Spoken in: Assam, India

Äiwoo – ?

- Spoken in: Temotu, Solomon Islands

Ajië – A’jie, Ajië, Houailou, Wai, Wailu

- Official language in: Houaïlou, New Caledonia, France

Aka-Jeru – Akajeru, Jeru, Yerawa

- Spoken in: Andaman Islands, India

Akan – Akan, Fante, Twi

- Official language in: Ghanaian/Ivoirian ethnic region of Akanland

Akatek – Kuti', q'anub'al'

- Spoken in: Guatemala, and Chiapas, Mexico

Akawaio – Kapon

- Spoken in: Bolívar in Venezuela; Guyana; and Roraima in Brazil

Akebu – Kǝkpǝǝ-kǝ

- Spoken in: Togo

Akei – Akei

- Spoken in: Santo, Vanuatu

Akeu – Gaolkheel

- Spoken in: Yunnan, China

Akha – Aˬ khaˬ dawˬ

- Spoken in: China, Laos, Myanmar and Thailand

Akhvakh – Ашвaлъи мицIи

- Spoken in: Southern Dagestan, Russia and Northern Azerbaijan

Akkadian † – akkadû or 𒀝𒅗𒁺𒌑

- Formerly an Official language in: Akkad or central Mesopotamia which is modern-day Iraq
- Later it became a lingua franca in the Middle East and Egypt

Aklanon – Akeanon, Binisaya nga Akeanon or Inakeanon

- Official Regional Language in: Philippines

Akoose – Akɔ́ɔ̄sē

- Spoken in: Cameroon

Akoye – Akoye

- Spoken in: Gulf Province, Papua New Guinea

Akum – aakuem

- Spoken in: Cameroon and Nigeria

Alago – Alago

- Spoken in: Nigeria

Alabama – Albaamaha

- Spoken in: Texas, United States, formerly Oklahoma, United States

Alas – Batak Alas

- Spoken by: the Alas, Kluet, and Singkil people of North Sumatra, Indonesia

Alawa – Kallana, Leealowa

- Spoken in: Northern Territory, Australia

Albanian – shqip

- Official language in: Albania, Kosovo, and North Macedonia
- Recognised Minority Language in: Croatia, Italy, Montenegro, Romania, and Serbia

Albanian Sign Language – Gjuha e Shqipe e Shenjave

- Signed in: Albania

Aleut – Unangam Tunuu, Унáҥам Тунý

- Official language in: Alaska, United States
- Spoken in: Kamchatka Krai, Russia

Algerian Arabic – الدارجة الجزائرية

- Spoken in: Algeria

Algerian Saharan Arabic – dŷazāri' or جزائري

- Spoken in: Algeria, Libya, Mali, Mauritania, Morocco, Niger, and Western Sahara

Algerian Sign Language – لغة الإشارة الجزائرية, ⵜⵓⵜⵍⴰⵢⵜ ⵜⴰⴷⵓⴳⴰⵎⵜ ⵏ ⴷⵣⴰⵢⵔ

- Signed in: Algeria

Algonquin – ᐊᓂᔑᓈᐯᒧᐎᓐ or anicinâbemowin

- Spoken in: Quebec, Canada

Alladian – Alladian

- Spoken in: Ivory Coast

Aloápam Zapotec – tizha'

- Spoken in: northern Oaxaca, Mexico

Alsatian – Elsässisch, Elsässerditsch

- Spoken in: Alsace, France

Altai (Northern) – Алтай тили

- Spoken in: Altai Krai, Russia

Altai (Southern) – Алтай тил

- Spoken in: Altai Republic, Russia

Alur – Lur

- Spoken in: the Democratic Republic of the Congo and Uganda

Alutiiq – Sugt’stun, Alutiit’stun

- Official language in: Alaska, United States

Alyutor – nəməlʔu

- Spoken in: Chukotka Autonomous Okrug, Russia

Amahuaca – Yora

- Spoken in: Ucayali, Peru, Brazil

Amami – 島口, シマユムタ

- Spoken in: Kagoshima Prefecture, Japan

Amarakaeri – Aratbuten hua’a

- Spoken in: Peru

Amba – Kwamba

- Spoken in: Uganda and the Democratic Republic of the Congo

Ambonese Malay – Bahasa Malayu Ambon

- Spoken in: Maluku, Indonesia

Amdang – Sìmí Amdangtí

- Spoken in: the Wadi Fira Region, Chad

American Sign Language – American Sign Language

- Signed in: the United States of America and Canada

Amharic – ኣማርኛ

- Official language in: Ethiopia

Amis – 'Amis or Pangcah

- Spoken in: Taiwan

Amo – Timap

- Spoken in: Nigeria

Amri – Amri Karbi

- Spoken in: Assam and Meghalaya, India

Ana Dogon – Ana Tiŋa

- Spoken in: Mali

Anaang – Anaañ

- Spoken in: Akwa Ibom State, Nigeria

Ancash Quechua – qichwa, nuna shimi

- Spoken in: Ancash, Peru

Ancient Egyptian † – 𓂋𓏺𓈖 𓆎𓅓𓏏𓊖

- Formerly spoken in: Ancient Egypt

Ancient Greek † – Ἑλληνική

- Formerly spoken in: much of the Mediterranean Sea (until 1453)

Andalusian Arabic † – عربية أندلسية

- Formerly spoken in: Al-Andalus (modern-day Spain and Portugal)

Andaman Creole Hindi – ?

- Spoken in: the Andaman Islands, India

Andi – къӀаваннаб мицӀцӀи

- Spoken in: Southern Dagestan, Russia

Andio – Andio

- Spoken in: Central Sulawesi, Indonesia

Anêm – ?

- Spoken in: West New Britain Province, Papua New Guinea

Anfillo – Mao

- Spoken in: Ethiopia

Angaatiha – Aŋaataha

- Spoken in: Morobe Province, Papua New Guinea

Angal – Angal Heneng

- Spoken in: Southern Highlands Province, Papua New Guinea

Angami – Tenyidie

- Spoken in: Nagaland, India

Angika – अंगिका

- Official language in: Jharkhand, India
- Spoken in: Nepal

Angkola – Batak Angkola

- Spoken by: the Angkola people of North Sumatra, Indonesia

Anglo-Norman † – Anglo-Normaund

- Formerly spoken in: the United Kingdom and the Republic of Ireland

Angloromani – Pogadi Chib

- Spoken in: the United Kingdom

Angolar Creole – n'golá

- Spoken in: São Tomé, São Tomé and Príncipe

Angosturas Tunebo – ?

- Spoken in: Colombia

Anii – Anii

- Recognised Minority Language in: Benin and Togo

Anindilyakwa – Amamalya Ayakwa

- Spoken in: Northern Territory, Australia

Anjam – Anjam

- Spoken in: Madang Province, Papua New Guinea

Annobonese Creole – Fa d'Ambu, Fá d'Ambô

- Spoken in: Annobón, Equatorial Guinea

Ansus – ?

- Spoken in: Yapen Islands Regency, Papua, Indonesia

Antiguan and Barbudan Creole – Aanteegan an' Baabyuudan / raa bak

- Spoken in: Antigua and Barbuda, Anguilla, Dominica, Montserrat, and Saint Kitts and Nevis

Antillean Creole – kreyòl, kréyòl, kréyol, kwéyòl, patois, patwa

- Spoken in: the French Antilles (esp. Guadeloupe, Grenada, Saint Lucia, Haiti, and Trinidad and Tobago

Anuak – Dha Anywaa

- Spoken in: Ethiopia and South Sudan

Anufo – Anufɔ

- Recognised Minority Language in: Benin

Anuki – Anuki

- Spoken in: Milne Bay Province, Papua New Guinea

Anyin – Anyin

- Spoken in: Ivory Coast and Ghana

Ao Naga – Ao Naga

- Spoken in: Nagaland, India

A'ou – ?

- Spoken in: Guizhou, China

Apache – Ndéé

- Spoken in: Southwestern United States

Apalachee † – ?

- Formerly spoken in: Florida, United States

Apinayé – Panhĩ kapẽr

- Spoken in: Tocantins, Brazil

Apma – Apma, Dalekte

- Spoken in: Vanuatu

Arabela – Tapweyokwaka

- Spoken in: Peru

Arabic – العربية

- Official language in: 27 countries and territories and 4 international organizations

Aragonese – l'Aragonés

- Official language in: Aragon, Spain

Arakanese – ရက္ခိုင်ဘာသာ

- Spoken in: Rakhine State, Myanmar and Chittagong Division, Bangladesh

Araki – Soron Raki

- Spoken in: Araki Island, Vanuatu

Aramaic – ܐܪܡܝܐ

- Spoken in: Iran, Iraq, Israel, Jordan, Lebanon, Palestine, Syria, and Turkey

Aranese – aranés

- Official language in: Val d'Aran, Spain

Arapaho – Hinono'eitiit

- Spoken by: the Arapaho people, United States

Arára (Mato Grosso) – ?

- Spoken in: Mato Grosso, Brazil

Arára (Pará) – Ugorongmo

- Spoken in: Pará, Brazil

Arawak – Lokono

- Spoken in: French Guiana, Suriname, Venezuela, Jamaica, and Barbados

Arbëreshë Albanian – Arbërisht, Tarbrisht

- Spoken in: Italy

Archi – аршаттен

- Spoken in: Dagestan, Russia

Ardhamagadhi Prakrit † – 𑀅𑀭𑁆𑀥𑀫𑀸𑀕𑀥𑀻

- Formerly spoken in: modern-day Bihar and Uttar Pradesh, India

Are – Are

- Spoken in: Milne Bay Province, Papua New Guinea

Argentine Sign Language – Lengua de señas argentina

- Signed in: Argentina

Arhuaco – Iku

- Spoken in: Magdalena Department, Colombia

Arikara – Sáhniš

- Spoken in: North Dakota, United States

Arin † – bbˈirk

- Formerly spoken in: Krasnoyarsk Krai, Russia

Armenian – Հայերեն

- Official language in: Armenia
- Recognised Minority Language in: Bulgaria, Cyprus, Poland, Romania, Samtskhe–Javakheti (Georgia, Iraq, Lebanon, Turkey, Ukraine, and California (United States)

Armenian Sign Language – Հայերեն ժեստերի լեզու

- Signed in: Armenia

Aromanian – Aromanian

- Recognised Minority Language in: North Macedonia, Albania, Greece and Serbia

Arop-Lukep – Tolokiwa

- Spoken in: the provinces of Madang, Papua New Guinea

Arpitan – arpetan or francoprovençâl

- Spoken in: France and Switzerland
- Recognised Minority Language in: Italy

Arrernte – Arrernte Angkentye

- Spoken in: Northern Territory, Australia

Arvanitika – arbërisht or αρbε̰ρίσ̈τ

- Spoken in: Greece

Asaro’o – Asarɨ’o

- Spoken in: Madang Province, Papua New Guinea

Asháninka – Asháninka

- Spoken in: Satipo province, Junín, Peru

Ashéninka – Ashéninka

- Spoken in: Peru and Brazil

Askopan – Eivo

- Spoken in: Bougainville, Papua New Guinea

Assamese – অসমীয়া

- Official language in: Assam, India
- Spoken in: Bhutan, Bangladesh, and India

Assiniboine – Nakhóda

- Spoken in: Canada and the United States

Assyrian Neo-Aramaic – ܣܘܪܝܬ

- Spoken in: Iran, Iraq, Syria, and Turkey

Asturian – Asturianu

- Spoken in: Asturias, Spain

Atatláhuca–San Miguel Mixtec – ?

- Spoken in: Oaxaca, Mexico

Atayal – Tayal

- Spoken in: Taiwan

Atikamekw – Nēhinawēwin

- Spoken in: Quebec, Canada

Atong – A’tong, A.tong, Atong

- Spoken in: Assam, India

Attapady Kurumba – അട്ടപ്പാടി കുറുംബ

- Spoken in: India

Attié – -Atshe

- Spoken in: Ivory Coast

Auregnais † – Auregnais

- Formerly spoken in: Alderney, a part of Guernsey, the United Kingdom

Auslan – Auslan, Australian Sign Language

- Official language in: Australia

Austral – Reo Tuha‘a pae

- Spoken in: Austral Islands, France

Australian Kriol – Kriol

- Spoken in: Northern Territory, Western Australia, Australia

Austrian Sign Language – Österreichische Gebärdensprache

- Signed in: Austria

Auye-Dao – Auwje, Maniwo, Moi, Moi-Wadea

- Spoken in: Central Papua, Indonesia

Avar – авар мацӏ, اوار ماض, магӏарул мацӏ, ماعارۇل ماض

- Official language in: Dagestan, Russia
- Spoken in: Azerbaijan, Georgia, Kazakhstan, and Turkey

Avatime – Sideme

- Spoken in: Ghana

Avestan – 𐬆𐬬𐬈𐬯𐬙𐬆𐬥

- Formerly spoken in: the eastern Iranian Plateau
- The Avestan language is a Zoroastrian liturgical language

Avikam – Avikam

- Spoken in: Ivory Coast

Avokaya – Ãvõkáyã

- Spoken in: South Sudan and the Democratic Republic of the Congo

Awa Pit – Awa Pit

- Spoken in: Colombia and Ecuador

Awadhi – अवधी

- Spoken in: India

Awak – Yěbù

- Spoken in: Adamawa State, Nigeria

Aweer – Boni

- Spoken in: Kenya

Awing – Mbɨ̂wiŋə

- Spoken in: Cameroon

Awijilah – Tawjilit, طاوجيليت or ⵟⴰⵡⵊⵉⵍⵉⵜ

- Spoken in: Libya

Awngi – አውጚ

- Spoken in: the Benishangul-Gumuz Region, Ethiopia

Ayapaneco – Ayapaneco

- Spoken in: Tabasco, Mexico

Aymara – Aymar aru

- Official language in: Bolivia and Peru
- Recognised Minority Language in: Chile and Argentina

Äynu – ئەينۇ

- Spoken in: Xinjiang Uyghur Autonomous Region, China

Azerbaijani – Azərbaycan dili, آذربایجان دیلی, Азәрбајҹан дили

- Official language in: Azerbaijan and Dagestan, Russia
- Spoken in: Iran, Turkey and Georgia

Azerbaijani Sign Language – Azərbaycan işarət dili

- Signed in: Azerbaijan

Azoyu Me'phaa – me̱'pha̱a̱ tsíndíí

- Spoken in: Guerrero, Mexico

=== B ===
Baatonum – baatɔnum

- Spoken in: Benin and Nigeria

Baba Malay – Peranakan

- Spoken in: Singapore

Babanki – Ga’a-Kejom

- Spoken in: Cameroon

Babine – Witsuwit’en, ᗔᙣᗔᗥᐣ

- Spoken in: British Columbia in Canada

Bada – Bádá'

- Spoken in: Central Sulawesi, Indonesia

Badaga – படக, ಬಡಗ, ബഡഗ

- Spoken in: Tamil Nadu, India

Baduy – Basa Baduy, Basa Sunda Kanékés

- Spoken in: Banten, Indonesia

Bafia – Rikpa

- Spoken in: Cameroon

Bafut – Bɨfɨɨ̀

- Spoken in: Cameroon

Baga † – Barka

- Formerly spoken in: Guinea

Bagheli – बघेली

- Spoken in: Madhya Pradesh, India

Bagirmi – Ɓarma

- Spoken in: Chad

Bagri – बागड़ी

- Spoken in: North of Rajasthan, India

Bagvalal – багвалал мисӀсӀ

- Spoken in: Southwestern Dagestan, Russia

Bahamian Creole – Bahamian

- Spoken in: Bahamas

Bahnar – Bahnar

- Spoken in: Vietnam

Bahrani Arabic – العربية البحرانية

- Spoken in: Bahrain and Saudi Arabia

Bai – Baip‧ngvp‧zix

- Spoken in: Yunnan Province, China

Bajan Creole – Bajan

- Spoken in: Barbados

Bajjika – बज्जिका

- Spoken in: India and Nepal

Baka – Tara Baká

- Spoken in: the Democratic Republic of the Congo and South Sudan

Baka (Cameroon) – Baka

- Spoken in: Cameroon; as well as in Gabon

Baki – Baki

- Spoken in: Vanuatu

Balaibalan – باليبلن

- Early constructed language from the 14th-16th century Middle East

Balanta – Fraase

- Spoken in: Guinea-Bissau

Balantak – Wurung Balantak

- Spoken in: Central Sulawesi, Indonesia

Bali – Abaali, Maya

- Spoken in: Taraba State, Nigeria

Bali (Congo) – Dhibalí

- Spoken in: the Democratic Republic of the Congo

Balinese – ᬩᬲᬩᬮᬶ

- Spoken in: Bali, Indonesia

Balkan Gagauz Turkish – Rumeli Türkçesi

- Spoken in: Turkey, Greece, Bulgaria, North Macedonia, Serbia, Kosovo

Balkan Romani – Balkaniko Romanes

- Spoken in: the Balkans

Balochi – بلۏچی

- Spoken in: Pakistan, Iran and Afghanistan

Balti – སྦལ་ཏིའི་སྐད་, بلتی

- Spoken in: Baltistan, Pakistan and Ladakh, India

Baltic Romani – ?

- Spoken in: Poland, Lithuania, Latvia, Belarus, Russia, Estonia, Finland, and Germany

Bambara – Bamanankan

- Official language in: Mali

Bamileke – Bamiléké

- Spoken in: the Western High Plateau, Cameroon

Bamun – Shüpamom

- Spoken in: Cameroon

Banaban † – ?

- Formerly spoken in: Banaba, Kiribati

Banda – ?

- Spoken in: the Central African Republic, the Democratic Republic of the Congo and South Sudan

Bangala – Mɔnɔkɔ na bangála

- Spoken in: the Democratic Republic of the Congo

Banggai – Banggai

- Spoken in: Banggai Archipelago, Central Sulawesi, Indonesia

Bangime – Baŋgɛri-mɛ

- Spoken in: Mali

Bangka Malay – Bahasa Bangka

- Spoken in: the island of Bangka, in the Bangka Belitung Islands, Indonesia

Bangwinji – Bangjinge

- Spoken in: Balanga, Billiri, and Kaltungo, Bauchi State, Nigeria

Banjarese – basa Banjar, jaku Banjar, باس بنجر

- Recognised Minority Language in: South Kalimantan, Central Kalimantan, Indonesia

Bantawa – बान्तावा

- Official language in: Sikkim, India and Koshi Province, Nepal

Baoulé – wawle

- Spoken in: Ivory Coast

Baram – Baraamu

- Spoken in: Nepal

Barasana-Eduria – Taiwano, Jãnerã - Eduria Oca

- Spoken in: Vaupés Department, Colombia

Barbareño † – ?

- Formerly spoken in: Santa Barbara and Santa Ynez, California, the United States

Barein – Barayin

- Spoken in: Southern Chad

Bari – Bari

- Spoken in: South Sudan

Barro Negro Tunebo – ?

- Spoken in: Casanare Department, Colombia

Basa – Rubassa

- Spoken in: Kogi State, Plateau State, Abuja, and Benue State, Nigeria

Basaa – ɓasaá, ɓàsàa

- Spoken in: Cameroon

Basap – ?

- Spoken in: East Kalimantan, Indonesia

Basa-Gumna † – Basa-Kaduna, Basa Kuta

- Formerly spoken in: Chanchaga, Niger State, Nigeria

Bashkir – башҡорт Теле, Başqort Tele

- Official language in: Bashkortostan, Russia

Basketo – ባስኬ፟ት

- Spoken in: the South West Ethiopia Peoples' Region, Ethiopia

Basque – Euskara

- Official language in: Basque Country, Spain
- Spoken in the French Basque Country, Pyrénées-Atlantiques, France, but with no legal status.

Bassa – Ɓǎsɔ́ɔ̀ (𖫢𖫧𖫳𖫒𖫨𖫰𖫨𖫱)

- Spoken by: Bassa people of Liberia and Sierra Leone

Batak – Batak

- Spoken in: Northern Palawan, the Philippines
- Note: Not to be confused with the Batak languages of North Sumatra, Indonesia

Batak Karo – Cakap Karo

- Spoken by: the Karo of North Sumatra, Indonesia

Batak Mandailing – Saro Mandailing

- Spoken by: the Mandailing of North Sumatra, Indonesia

Batak Simalungun – Sahap Simalungun

- Spoken by: the Simalungun of North Sumatra, Indonesia

Batak Toba – Hata Batak Toba, ᯂᯖ ᯅᯖᯂ᯲ ᯖᯬᯅ

- Spoken by: the Toba of North Sumatra, Indonesia

Baṭḥari – Bəṭaḥrēt

- Spoken in: Oman

Bats – ბაცბა მოტტ

- Spoken in: Georgia

Bavarian – Boarisch, Boirisch

- Spoken in: Bavaria, Austria and South Tyrol in Italy

Bayot – Jola Bayote

- Spoken in: Senegal and Guinea-Bissau

Beaver – Dane-zaa Ẕáágéʔ (ᑕᓀᖚ ᖚᗀᐥ)

- Spoken in: British Columbia, Canada

Bedik – Ménik

- Spoken in: Senegal

Behoa – básá Behóá

- Spoken in: Central Sulawesi, Indonesia

Beja – Bidhaawyeet, Tubdhaawi, تُبڈاوِ

- Recognised Minority Language in: Egypt, Eritrea and Sudan

Belait – Lemeting, Metteng

- Spoken in: Belait District and Tutong District, Brunei and Sarawak, Malaysia

Belarusian – Беларуская

- Official language in: Belarus
- Recognised Minority Language in: Ukraine

Belizean Creole – Belize Kriol, Kriol

- Spoken in: Belize

Bemba – iciBemba

- Official language in: Zambia

Bena – Kibena

- Spoken in: Tanzania

Bench – Benc'non

- Spoken in: the South West Ethiopia Peoples' Region, Ethiopia

Bengali – বাংলা

- Official language in: Bangladesh and India

Beothuk † – Beothuk

- Formerly spoken in: the island of Newfoundland, Canada

Berber – Tamaziɣt, Tamazight, or ⵜⴰⵎⴰⵣⵉⵖⵜ

- Spoken in: Northern Africa

Berom – Cèn Bèrom or Lêm Bèrom

- Spoken in: Plateau State, Nigeria

Berta – Gebeto or Wetawit

- Spoken in: the Benishangul-Gumuz Region, Ethiopia

Betawi – Basè Betawi, Basa Betawi

- Spoken in: Jakarta, Tangerang City, Tangerang Regency, South Tangerang City in Banten, Bekasi City, Bekasi Regency, Bogor Regency, Depok City in West Java, Indonesia

Bezhta – бежкьалас миц

- Spoken in: Dagestan, Russia

Bhadrawahi – भद्रवाही

- Spoken in: Jammu and Kashmir, India

Bhele – Kipiri, eBhele

- Spoken in: the Democratic Republic of the Congo

Bhilali – ?

- Spoken in: India

Bhili – भीली, ભીલી

- Spoken in: Dadra and Nagar Haveli and Daman and Diu, Madhya Pradesh, Gujarat, Rajasthan and Maharashtra, India

Bhojpuri – 𑂦𑂷𑂔𑂣𑂳𑂩𑂲, भोजपुरी, بھوجپوري

- Spoken in: Bihar, India; Jharkhand, India; Uttar Pradesh, India; Guyana; Suriname; and Trinidad and Tobago

Bhumij – ভূমিজ, ଭୁମିଜ୍, भूमिज, 𞗘𞗪𞗢𞗑𞗜𞗥𞗰

- Official language in: Jharkhand, India

Biak – Wós Vyak, Wós Kovedi

- Spoken in: Biak Numfor Regency, Papua, Indonesia

Biatah Bidayuh – Biatah, Menyu dayak

- Spoken in: Sarawak, Malaysia, Indonesia

Biate – Biate, Biete

- Spoken in: Some districts in the states of Meghalaya, Mizoram, Assam; and in Manipur, all in India

Biblical Hebrew – שְֹפַת כְּנַעַן, יְהוּדִית, (לָשׁוֹן) עִבְרִית, לְשׁוֹן הַקֹּדֶשׁ

- Formerly spoken in: the Kingdom of Judah, the Kingdom of Israel (Samaria) and the Hasmonean dynasty (Modern-day Israel)
- Biblical Hebrew is a Jewish liturgical language

Bidayuh Serian – Bidayŭh Bukar-Sadung

- Spoken in: Sarawak, Malaysia, Indonesia

Big Nambas – V'ənen Taut

- Spoken in: Malakula, Vanuatu

Bihari – बिहारी भाषा

- Spoken in: India and Nepal

Bijago – Kangaki-Kagbaaga-Kajoko Bidyogo

- Spoken in: Guinea-Bissau

Bikol – Bikol

- Spoken in: Bicol Region, Philippines

Bila – Kubila

- Spoken in: the Democratic Republic of the Congo

Bilaspuri – बिलासपूरी

- Spoken in: Himachal Pradesh, India

Bilen – ብሊን

- Recognised Minority Language in: Eritrea

Biloxi † – Tanêksąyaa

- Formerly spoken in: Mississippi and Louisiana, the United States

Bilua – Bilua

- Spoken in: Vella Lavella, Western Province, the Solomon Islands

Bima – Nggahi Mbojo

- Spoken in: West Nusa Tenggara, Indonesia

Binandere – Binandere

- Spoken in: Oro Province, Papua New Guinea

Binukid – Binukid

- Spoken in: Bukidnon, Mindanao, the Philippines

Bira – Kibira

- Spoken in: Democratic Republic of the Congo

Bishnupriya Manipuri – বিষ্ণুপ্রিয়া মণিপুরী

- Spoken in: Northeast India and Bangladesh

Bisis – Bises

- Spoken in: East Sepik Province, Papua New Guinea

Bislama – Bislama

- Official language in: Vanuatu

Bissa – Bɩsa

- Spoken in: Burkina Faso, Ghana and Togo

Blackfoot – ᑯᖾᖹ, ᓱᖽᐧᖿ, Siksiká

- Spoken by: the Blackfoot Tribe of the United States and Canada

Blang – Plang

- Spoken in: China, Myanmar and Thailand

Bodo – बड़ो

- Spoken in: India and Nepal

Bokobaru – Zogben

- Spoken in: Kwara State, Nigeria

Bola – Bakovi

- Spoken in: West New Britain Province, Papua New Guinea

Bole – bòo pìkkà

- Spoken in: Bauchi State, Gombe State, Yobe State and Plateau State, Nigeria

Bolivian Sign Language – Lengua de Señas Bolivianas

- Signed in: Bolivia

Bolyu – ?

- Spoken in: Longlin County, Guangxi, China

Boma – Kiboma

- Spoken in: the Democratic Republic of the Congo

Bomu – Boomu

- Official language in: Mali
- Also spoken in: Burkina Faso

Bono – Abron

- Spoken in: Ghana and Ivory Coast

Bontoc – Bontoc

- Spoken in: Mountain Province, the Philippines

Bororo – Boe Wadáru, bataru-boe

- Spoken in: Mato Grosso, Brazil

Bosnian – Босански, Bosanski

- Official language in: Bosnia and Herzegovina
- Recognised Minority Language in: Albania, Kosovo, Montenegro, North Macedonia, and Serbia

Bote – बोटे

- Recognised Minority Language in: Nepal

Botlikh – Буйхалъи мицIцIи

- Spoken in: Southwestern Dagestan, Russia

Bouyei – Haausqyaix

- Spoken in: Chinese provinces of Guizhou, Yunnan and Sichuan and Vietnam

Brahui – براہوئی

- Spoken in: Balochistan, Pakistan

Braj Bhasha – ब्रजभाषा

- Spoken in: India

Brazilian Sign Language – Língua Brasileira de Sinais

- Signed in: Brazil and by Brazilian diaspora

Breton – Brezhoneg

- Spoken in: Brittany, France

Bribri – Bribri

- Spoken in: the cantons of Talamanca in Limón, and Buenos Aires in Puntarenas, both in Costa Rica

British Sign Language – British Sign Language, Breetish Sign Leid, Iaith Arwyddion Prydain, Cànan Soidhnidh Bhreatainn, Teanga Chomharthaíochta na Breataine

- Signed in: the United Kingdom

Brunei Malay – Bahasa Melayu Brunei, بهاس ملايو بروني

- Spoken in: Brunei, Malaysia

Bube – Bubi, Bohobé, Bube–Benga, Bobe

- Spoken in: Bioko, Equatorial Guinea, and Gabon

Budu Dogon – Bunɔɡɛ

- Spoken in: Mali

Budukh – Budad mez

- Spoken in: Azerbaijan

Bugan – Pakan

- Spoken in: Yunnan, China

Buginese – ᨅᨔ ᨕᨘᨁᨗ

- Spoken in: South Sulawesi, Indonesia

Buglere – Buglere

- Spoken in: Eastern Panama

Bugun – Khowa

- Spoken in: Arunachal Pradesh, India

Buhi’non Bikol – Bikol-Boînën, Boînën

- Spoken in: Buhi, Camarines Sur of the Bicol region of the Philippines

Buhid – ᝊᝓᝑᝒᝇ

- Spoken in: Mindoro, Philippines

Bukharian – בוכארי, бухорӣ, buxorī

- Spoken in: Uzbekistan, Tajikistan and Afghanistan

Bukiyip – Bukiyúp

- Spoken in: East Sepik Province, Papua New Guinea

Buksa – बुक्सा

- Spoken in: Uttarakhand, India

Bulgarian – български език

- Official language in: Bulgaria and the European Union
- Recognised Minority Language in: Romania, Serbia, and Ukraine

Bulgarian Sign Language – Български жестомимичен език

- Signed in: Bulgaria

Buli – Buli

- Spoken in: Ghana

Bulu – Bulu

- Spoken in: Cameroon

Bunak – Bunaq, Buna', Bunake

- Spoken in: central Timor between Indonesia and Timor-Leste

Bundeli – बुन्देली

- Spoken in: Madhya Pradesh, India

Bunun – Bunun

- Recognised Minority Language in: Taiwan

Burmese – မြန်မာစာ or မြန်မာစကား

- Official language in: Myanmar

Buru – Buru

- Spoken in: Buru Regency, Maluku, Indonesia

Burushaski – بُرُݸشَسکݵ

- Spoken in: Gilgit Division, Pakistan

Buryat – буряад хэлэн

- Official language in: Buryatia, Russia

Bussa – Mossittaata, Mossiya, ሞስሲትቷታ or ሞስሲያ

- Spoken in: Ethiopia

Bushi – Kibushi

- Spoken in: Mayotte, France

Buu – Nubabo

- Spoken in: Cameroon

=== C ===
C’Lela – C'Lela

- Spoken in: Kebbi State, Niger State, and Zamfara State, Nigeria

Caac – caaàc

- Spoken in: Pouébo, New Caledonia, France

Cabécar – Cabécar

- Spoken in: Costa Rica

Caddo † – Hasí:nay

- Formerly spoken in: Oklahoma in the United States

Cahto – Katoiana

- Spoken in: California in the United States

Cahuarano † – Cahuiawano

- Formerly spoken in: Peru

Cahuilla – Ivia

- Spoken in: the southern area of California, the United States

Cahungwarya – Cәhungwә̀ryə̀

- Spoken in: Niger State, Nigeria

Cajun French – Français cajun

- Spoken in: Louisiana, United States

Caló – Caló

- Spoken by: the Romani, Portugal, and the southern area of France

Calusa † – ?

- Formerly spoken in: Florida, United States

Cameroonian Pidgin English – Wes Cos, Kamtok

- Spoken in: Cameroon

Camling – चाम्लिङ

- Spoken in: Nepal

Camsá – Camëntsá

- Spoken in: Putumayo Department, Colombia

Candoshi-Shapra – Kandoazi koko

- Spoken in: Loreto, Peru

Canichana † – Canesi, Joaquiniano

- Formerly spoken in: Bolivia

Cantabrian – cántabru, montañés

- Spoken in: the Spanish autonomous communities of Cantabria and Asturias

Cantonese – 廣東話

- Official language in: Hong Kong and Macau
- Also spoken in: Guangdong Province, China

Cape Verdean Creole – kauberdianu, kabuverdianu, kriolu, kriol

- Spoken in: Cape Verde

Cape Verdean Sign Language – Língua Gestual Caboverdiana

- Signed in: Cape Verde

Capiznon – Binisaya, Binisaya nga Capiznon, Bisaya, Capiceño

- Spoken in: Capiz, Philippines

Caquinte – Aguenquetsatsare

- Spoken in: Peru

Car – Pû

- Spoken in: the island of Car Nicobar of the Nicobar Islands of India

Carapana – Carapana

- Spoken in: Vaupés Department, Colombia, and Amazonas, Brazil

Carib – Kari'nja

- Spoken in: Brazil, French Guiana, Suriname, Venezuela, and Trinidad and Tobago

Caribbean Hindustani – कॅरेबियाई हिंदुस्तानी, 𑂍𑂶𑂩𑂵𑂥𑂱𑂨𑂰𑂆⸱𑂯𑂱𑂁𑂠𑂳𑂮𑂹𑂞𑂰𑂢𑂲, کَیریبئائی ہندوستانی

- Spoken in: Guyana, Suriname and Trinidad and Tobago

Carijona – Tsahá

- Spoken in: Colombia

Carolina Algonquian † – Pamlico

- Formerly spoken in: North Carolina, the United States

Carolinian – Refaluwasch

- Official language in: Northern Mariana Islands

Carpathian Romani – ?

- Spoken in: Poland, Czech Republic, Slovakia, Austria, Ukraine, and Slovenia

Carrier – ᑐᑊᘁᗕᑋᗸ

- Spoken in: British Columbia, Canada

Carrier (Southern) – ᑐᑊᘁᗕᑋᗸ

- Spoken in: British Columbia, Canada

Catalan – català

- Official language in: Andorra, Balearic Islands and Catalonia, Spain
- Recognised Minority Language in: Pyrénées-Orientales, Italy, Spain

Catalan Sign Language – Llengua de signes catalana

- Signed in: Catalonia, Spain

Catawba – Katapa

- Spoken in: South Carolina in the United States

Cayuga – Gayogo̱hó:nǫ’

- Spoken by: the Iroquois Cayuga people living in the Canadian First Nation reservation of the Six Nations of the Grand River First Nation

Cebuano – Bisaya, Sinugboanon

- Spoken in: Central Visayas and Mindanao, Philippines

Cèmuhî – Cemuhî, Cèmuhî

- Spoken in: New Caledonia

Central Alaskan Yupʼik – Yugtun, Cugtun

- Official language in: Alaska, the United States

Central Bikol – Bikol Sentral

- Spoken in: Bicol Region, the Philippines

Central Dusun – Boros Dusun

- Spoken in: Sabah, Malaysia

Central Nahuatl – ?

- Spoken in: Tlaxcala, Mexico

Central Nicobarese – Mūöt

- Spoken in: the Nicobar Islands, India

Central Sama – Sinama

- Spoken in: Sulu, Tawi-Tawi, Zamboanga City and Basilan, the Philippines, Malaysia

Central Siberian Yupik – Yupigestun, Akuzipigestun, Юпик

- Official language in: Chukotka Autonomous Okrug, Russia, the United States

Central Tarahumara – Ralámuli raꞌíchala

- Spoken in: Chihuahua, Mexico

Central Tunebo – Uw Cuwa

- Spoken in: Boyacá Department, Colombia, Venezuela

Central Yambasa – Nuasua, Nuaswa

- Spoken in: Cameroon

Central ǃKung – ǃXun

- Spoken in: Grootfontein, Namibia

Chachi – Cha'Palaa

- Recognised Minority Language in: Ecuador

Chadian Arabic – لهجة تشادية

- Spoken in: Chad

Chagatai † – چغتای

- Formerly spoken in: Central Asia

Chagossian Creole – kreol Ilwa

- Official language in: the self-declared Chagossian Government

Chakma – 𑄌𑄋𑄴𑄟𑄳𑄦 𑄞𑄌𑄴

- Spoken in: Chittagong Hill Tracts and CADC, Bangladesh, Mizoram, Tripura, Arunachal Pradesh, and Assam, India, Myanmar

Chalcatongo Mixtec – Chalcatongo

- Spoken in: Oaxaca in Mexico

Chaldean Neo-Aramaic – ܟܠܕܝܐ

- Spoken by: Assyrians in the Assyrian homeland and globally by diaspora

Cham – ꨌꩌ

- Spoken in: Cambodia, Laos and Vietnam

Chamalal – чамалалдуб мичӏчӏ

- Spoken in: Southwestern Dagestan, Russia

Chamorro – Chamoru, Fino'Chamorro

- Official language in: Guam and the Northern Mariana Islands

Chaná – Lanték Yañá

- Spoken in: Entre Ríos, Argentina and formerly Uruguay

Charrúa † – ?

- Formerly spoken in: Uruguay

Chavacano – Chabacano

- Regional language in: the Philippines

Chechen – Нохчийн Mотт

- Official language in: Chechnya, Russia

Chemakum † – Aqoʞúlo

- Formerly spoken in: the Olympic Peninsula, Washington, the United States

Chenchu – చెంచు

- Spoken in: the states of Andhra Pradesh and Telangana, India

Chepang – चेपाङ, च्योःबाङ् भासा

- Spoken in: Nepal

Cherokee – ᏣᎳᎩ, ᏣᎳᎩ ᎦᏬᏂᎯᏍᏗ, Tsalagi, Tsalagi Gawonihisdi

- Official language in: the Cherokee Nation, United States
- Recognised Minority Language in: Alabama, Florida , Georgia, Illinois, Iowa, Kentucky, Mississippi, Nebraska, New Jersey, New York, North Carolina, Ohio, South Carolina, Tennessee, all in the United States

Chewa – Chicheŵa

- Official language in: Zimbabwe
- Spoken in: Malawi and Zambia

Cheyenne – Tsėhesenėstsestotse, Tsisinstsistots

- Spoken in: Montana, United States

Chhattisgarhi – छत्तीसगढ़ी

- Spoken in: Chhattisgarh, India

Chibcha † – Muysc cubun

- Formerly spoken in: Colombia

Chichimeca Jonaz – Úza’

- Spoken in: Guanajuato, Mexico

Chickasaw – Chikasha

- Spoken in: Chickasaw Nation, Oklahoma, United States

Chilcotin – Tŝinlhqutʼin

- Spoken in: British Columbia, Canada

Chilean Sign Language – Lengua de Señas Chilena

- Signed in: Chile

Chinese – 汉语, 漢語, 华语, 華語, or 中文

- Official language in: China; Singapore; Taiwan; Wa State in Myanmar and the United Nations
- Recognised Minority Language in: Malaysia, the Philippines, Brunei, the United States, and even more

Chinese Sign Language – 中国手语

- Signed in: China

Chinook Jargon – Chinuk Wawa

- Spoken in: the United States and Canada

Chipaya – Chipaya

- Official language in: Bolivia

Chipewyan – ᑌᓀᓲᒢᕄᓀ, Dene Suline, Dëne Sųłiné

- Spoken in: Northwest Territories, Canada

Chippewa – Anishinaabemowin, ᐊᓂᐦᔑᓈᐯᒧᐎᓐ

- Spoken in: Upper Peninsula of Michigan, Wisconsin, Minnesota, and North Dakota, the United States

Chiquitano – ?

- Official language in: Bolivia
- Also spoken in: Mato Grosso do Sul, Brazil

Chiru – चीरू

- Spoken in: Manipur, India

Chitimacha † – Sitimaxa, Čitimaaša

- Formerly spoken in: Louisiana, the United States

Chitkuli Kinnauri – चित्कुली किन्नौरी

- Spoken in: Himachal Pradesh, India

Chitonga – ChiTonga

- Recognised Minority Language in: Malawi

Chittagonian – চাটগাঁইয়া বুলি

- Spoken in: Bangladesh

Chocangaca – ཁྱོ་ཅ་ང་ཅ་ཁ་

- Spoken in: Bhutan

Choctaw – Chahta', Chahta Anumpa

- Spoken in: Choctaw Nation, Oklahoma, United States

Chokwe – Ucôkwe

- Official language in: Angola
- Spoken in: Democratic Republic of the Congo, and Zambia

Chʼol – Lakty'añ

- Spoken in: Chiapas, Tabasco, and Campeche in Mexico

Chontal Maya – Yokotʼan

- Spoken in: Tabasco, Mexico

Chopi – Chichopi

- Spoken in: Mozambique

Chʼortiʼ – čorti'

- Spoken in: Guatemala, Honduras and El Salvador

Chrau – Chrau

- Spoken in: Vietnam

Chru – Chru

- Spoken in: Vietnam

Chug – Duhumbi

- Spoken in: West Kameng district, Arunachal Pradesh in India

Chuj – Koti'

- Spoken in: Guatemala and Mexico

Chukchi – чаучу

- Spoken in: Russia in the Chukotka Autonomous Okrug

Chulym – Ось тили, тадар тили

- Spoken in: Krasnoyarsk Krai, Russia

Chung – Cung

- Spoken in: Cameroon

Churahi – चुराही

- Spoken in: Himachal Pradesh, India

Church Slavonic – Црькъвьнословѣ́ньскъ ѩꙁꙑ́къ, Церковнославѧ́нскїй Ѧ҆зы́къ, ⱌⱃⰽⰲⰰⱀⱁⱄⰾⱁⰲⱑⱀⱄⰽⱜ ⰵⰸⰻⰽⱜ, ⱌⰹⱃⱏⰽⱏⰲⱏⱀⱁⱄⰾⱁⰲⱑⱀⱐⱄⰽⱏⰹ ⱗⰸⱏⰻⰽⱏ

- Church Slavonic is a liturgical language used by the Eastern Orthodox Church

Chuukese – Chuuk

- Official language in: Chuuk, the Federated States of Micronesia

Chuvash – Чӑвашла, Çăvaşla

- Official language in: Chuvashia, Russia

Chuwabu – Echuwabo

- Spoken in: Central Mozambique

Cia-Cia – Bahasa Ciacia, 바하사 찌아찌아, بهاس چيا-چيا

- Spoken in: Southeast Sulawesi, Indonesia

Cimbrian – Zimbrisch

- Spoken in: Italy

Citak – Kau Atakum

- Spoken in: South Papua, Indonesia

Classical Arabic – العربية الفصحى

- Formerly spoken in: Early Islamic Caliphates
- Classical Arabic is a liturgical language of Islam

Classical Armenian † – գրաբար

- Formerly spoken in: the Armenian highlands

Classical Chinese – 古文 or 文言

- Literary language used in: China, Taiwan, Vietnam, North Korea, South Korea, and Japan

Classical Japanese † – 文語

- Formerly spoken in: Japan

Classical Mandaic – ࡋࡉࡔࡀࡍࡀ ࡖ ࡌࡀࡍࡃࡀࡉࡉࡀ

- Spoken in: Iraq and Iran
- The Mandaic language is a liturgical language of Mandaeism

Classical Mongolian † – ?

- Formerly spoken in: Mongolia, China, Russia

Classical Nahuatl † – Nāhuatlāhtōlli

- Formerly spoken in: Aztec Empire

Classical Nepal Bhasa † – पुलाङु नेपाल भास

- Formerly spoken in: Nepal, Bhutan, Tibet (China) and India

Classical Tibetan † – ?

- Formerly spoken in: Greater Tibet

Coastal Kadazan – Boos Kadazan (Bo'os Kadazan)

- Spoken in: Sabah, Malaysia

Cochimi † – Laymón

- Formerly spoken in: Baja California, Mexico

Cocopah – Kwikapa

- Spoken in: Baja California, Mexico, the United States

Cocos Islands Malay – Basa Pulu Cocos

- Spoken in: Cocos (Keeling) Islands, Australia and Malaysia

Coeur d'Alene – Snchitsu’umshtsn

- Spoken in: northern Idaho, the United States

Cofán – A’ingae

- Spoken in: Colombia and Ecuador

Colombian Sign Language – Lengua de Señas Colombiana

- Signed in: Colombia

Colorado River Numic – ?

- Spoken in: Nevada, California, Utah, Arizona, Colorado, and New Mexico, the United States

Columbia-Wenatchi † – nxaảmxcín

- Formerly spoken in: Washington, the United States

Comaltepec Chinantec – Jmíiˊ

- Spoken in: Oaxaca, Mexico

Comanche – Nʉmʉ Tekwapʉ

- Spoken in: Oklahoma, United States

Common Brittonic † – Brittonikā

- Formerly spoken in: Great Britain

Comorian – shikomori', شِكُمُرِ

- Official language in: Comoros
- Spoken in: Mayotte, France

Comox – Éyɂáɂjuuthem, ʔayajuθəm, q̓yʔq̓yʔɛmixʷq̓ɛnəm

- Spoken in: British Columbia, Canada

Cook Islands Māori – ‘Airani

- Official language in: Cook Islands, New Zealand

Coptic – ϯⲙⲉⲧⲣⲉⲙⲛ̀ⲭⲏⲙⲓ

- The Coptic language is a Coptic liturgical language

Cora – naáyarite

- Spoken in: Nayarit, Mexico

Cornish – Kernewek, Kernowek

- Recognised Minority Language in: Cornwall, the United Kingdom

Corsican – Corsu

- Recognised Minority Language in: France

Costa Rican Sign Language – Lengua de señas costarricense

- Signed in: Costa Rica

Cowlitz † – ƛʼpúlmixq

- Formerly spoken in: Washington, United States

Cree – ᓀᐦᐃᔭᐍᐏᐣ

- Official language in: Northwest Territories, Canada

Crimean Tatar – qırımtatar tili, къырымтатар тили, قریم تاتار تلی

- Official language in: Crimea, Ukraine

Croatian – hrvatski

- Official language in: Croatia, Bosnia and Herzegovina, Vojvodina (Serbia), and the European Union
- Recognised Minority Language in: Slovakia, Czech Republic, Montenegro, Burgenland (Austria), Baranya County (Hungary) and Italy

Croatian Sign Language – Hrvatski znakovni jezik

- Signed in: Croatia

Crow – Apsáalooke aliláau

- Spoken in: Great Plains, United States

Cuban Sign Language – Lengua de señas cubana

- Signed in: Cuba

Cubeo – Pãmié

- Spoken in: Vaupés Department, Colombia, Brazil

Cuitlatec † – Uhpɨnéʔlu

- Formerly spoken in: Guerrero, Mexico

Cuman † – tatar til

- Formerly spoken in: Cumania

Cupeño † – Kupangaxwicham Pe'me̱melki

- Formerly spoken in: the southern area of California, United States

Curripaco – Kurripako

- Spoken in: Guainía Department, Colombia, Venezuela, Brazil

Cuyonon – Cuyonon

- Spoken in: Cuyo, Palawan, the Philippines

Cypriot Arabic – Σάννα, Sanna, سانا

- Recognised Minority Language in: Cyprus

Cypriot Sign Language – Κυπριακή Νοηματική Γλώσσα

- Signed in: Cyprus

Czech – čeština, český jazyk

- Official language in: Czech Republic and the European Union

Czech Sign Language – Český znakový jazyk

- Signed in: Czech Republic

=== D ===
Da’a Kaili – Basa Da'a

- Spoken in: Central Sulawesi, Indonesia

Daakaka – Daakaka

- Spoken in: Vanuatu

Daasanach – Af Daasanach

- Spoken in: the South West Ethiopia Peoples' Region, Ethiopia; and Kenya

Dagaare – Dagaare

- Spoken in: Ghana, Burkina Faso, and Ivory Coast

Dagbani – Dagbanli

- Spoken in: Ghana and Togo

Dagur – Даор Усуву, ᡩᠠᠣ‍ᠷ ᡠᠰᡠᠸᡠ, Daor Usuwu, ᡩᠠᠸᡠᠷ ᡴᡝᠯ, Dagur Kel

- Spoken in: Chinese province of Heilongjiang; Chinese autonomous regions of Inner Mongolia and Xinjiang

Dahalo – numma guhooni

- Spoken in: Kenya

Dair – Thaminyi or طهامينيي

- Spoken in: Sudan

Dakhini – دکنی

- Official language in: India and the United Arab Emirates

Dakota – Dakȟótiyapi

- Spoken in: Canada and the United States

Dalecarlian – Dalmål

- Spoken in: Sweden

Dalmatian † – dalmato

- Formerly spoken in: Dalmatia, Croatia

Daloa Bété – Bhɛtɩ Gbʋ

- Spoken in: Daloa, Ivory Coast

Damin † – Demiin

- Formerly spoken in: Queensland, Australia

Dan – Dã̀ã̀

- Spoken in: Ivory Coast, Guinea and Liberia

Dangaléat – Daŋla

- Spoken in: Chad

Danish – dansk

- Official language in: Denmark, the Faroe Islands and the European Union
- Recognised Minority Language in: Germany, Greenland, and Iceland

Danish Sign Language – Dansk tegnsprog

- Signed in: Denmark

Dano-Norwegian † – dansk-norsk

- Formerly spoken in: Denmark–Norway

Dar Daju Daju – Dajiŋge

- Spoken in: Chad

Dar Fur Daju – Bekke

- Spoken in: Darfur, Sudan

Darai – दरइ

- Spoken in: Nepal

Dargwa – Дарган Mез

- Official language in: Dagestan, Russia

Dawro – Dawrotsuwa, ዳውሮꬃዋ

- Spoken in: Ethiopia

Daza – Dazaga

- Spoken in: Chad and Niger

Dazawa – Daza

- Spoken in: Bauchi State, Nigeria

Defaka – Défàkà

- Spoken in: Opobo/Nkoro, Rivers State, Nigeria

Deg – Dɛg

- Spoken in: Ghana

Deg Xinag – Deg Hitʼan

- Official language in: Alaska, the United States

Delaware – Lënapei èlixsuwakàn

- Spoken by: the Delaware people in the United States

Denaʼina – Denaʼina Qenaga, Denaʼinaqʼ

- Official language in: Alaska, the United States

Dengese – Londengese

- Spoken in: the Democratic Republic of the Congo

Deori – জিমʼচাঁয়া/দেউৰী

- Spoken in: Assam and Arunachal Pradesh, India

Desia – ଦେଶିଆ

- Spoken in: some districts in Odisha and Andhra Pradesh, India

Dhatki – धाटकी, ڍاٽڪي

- Spoken in: Mirpur Khas Division, Pakistan and Rajasthan, India

Dhimal – धिमाल

- Spoken in: Mechi and Koshi provinces, Nepal

Dhivehi – ދިވެހި

- Official language in: Maldives

Dhofari Arabic – ظوفري

- Spoken in: Dhofar, Oman

Dhuwal – Dhay'yi

- Spoken in: Northern Territory, Australia

Digaro Mishmi – tɑ31 rɑŋ53, da31 raŋ53, tɯŋ53

- Spoken in: northeastern Arunachal Pradesh, India and Zayü County, Tibet, China

Digo – Chidigo

- Spoken in: Mombasa and Kwale counties, Kenya; and Tanzania

Dii – Ya̧g dìì

- Spoken in: Cameroon

Dilling – Warki

- Spoken in: Southern Sudan

Dimasa – Grao-Dima

- Spoken in: Assam and Nagaland, India

Dinka – Thuɔŋjäŋ

- Spoken in: South Sudan

Ditidaht – diitiid7aa7tx, diitiidʔaaʔtx̣

- Spoken in: southern part of Vancouver Island, British Columbia, Canada

Djambarrpuyngu – Djampbarrpuyŋu

- Spoken in: Northern Territory, Australia

Dla – Dla

- Spoken in: Papua, Indonesia, Papua New Guinea

Dogri – डोगरी, 𑠖𑠵𑠌𑠤𑠮, ڈوگری

- Official language in: Jammu and Kashmir, India
- Also spoken in: other parts of India and in Pakistan

Dogrib – Tłı̨chǫ Yatıì

- Official language in: the Northwest Territories, Canada

Dolgan – Дулҕан, Dulğan, Һака, Haka

- Spoken in: Krasnoyarsk Krai, Russia

Dom – Dom

- Spoken in: Chimbu Province, Papua New Guinea

Domari – Dômarî

- Recognised Minority Language in: Iran, Afghanistan, Egypt, India, Iraq, Israel, Jordan, Libya, Palestine, Russia, Sudan, Syria, Turkey, and Uzbekistan

Dombe – isiTonga

- Official language in: Zimbabwe
- Recognised Minority Language in: Zambia

Dominican Sign Language – Lengua de señas Dominicana, Lengua de señas República Dominicana

- Signed in: Dominican Republic

Dong – lix Gaeml

- Spoken in: Guizhou, Hunan and Guangxi, China

Dongxiang – Santa

- Spoken in: Inner Mongolia, China

Doteli – डोटेली

- Official language in: Sudurpashchim Province, Nepal
- Recognised Minority Language in: Karnali Province, Nepal

Drehu – Dehu, Lifou, Lifu, Qene Drehu

- Official language in: Lifou, New Caledonia

Drents – Drèents

- Spoken in: Drenthe, the Netherlands

Drung – Tvrung kvt

- Spoken in: Yunnan and Tibet, China

Duala – Duala

- Spoken in: Cameroon

Duhwa – Karfa

- Spoken in: Nasarawa State, Nigeria

Duna – Yuna, Yunaya haga

- Spoken in: Southern Highlands Province, Papua New Guinea

Dungan – 回族语言, Xуэйзў йүян

- Spoken by: the Central Asian Dungan people

Durkha – тyъһа тыл

- Spoken in: Khövsgöl Province, Mongolia

Duruma – Chiduruma

- Spoken in: Kwale County, Kenya

Dutch – Nederlands

- Official language in: Belgium, Aruba, Bonaire, Curaçao, Sint Eustatius, Sint Maarten, Saba, the Netherlands, Suriname and the European Union

Dutch Sign Language – Nederlandse Gebarentaal

- Signed in: the Netherlands

Dutton World Speedwords – rapmotz

- International auxiliary language

Dyula – Julakan

- Spoken in: Ivory Coast, Burkina Faso and Mali

Dza – Dzə

- Spoken in: the states of Taraba and Adamawa, Nigeria

Dzao Min – Ba Pai

- Spoken in: China

Dzongkha – རྫོང་ཁ་

- Official language in: Bhutan

Dzubukuá † – Kariri, Kariri-Xocó

- Official language in: Crateús, Ceará, Brazil
- Formerly spoken in: Cabrobó, Pernambuco, Brazil

Dzùùngoo – Dzùùngoo, Kpankagooma

- Spoken in: Burkina Faso

=== E ===
E – 誒

- Spoken in: Guangxi, China

Early Modern English † – English

- Formerly spoken in: England, Wales, Scotland, Ireland and English overseas possessions

Eastern Bru – ບຣູ້

- Spoken in: Laos and Vietnam

Eastern Pwo – ဖၠုံ, ဖၠုံယှိုဝ်, ဖၠုံဘာႋသာ့ဆ်ုခၠါင်, ဖၠုံဆ်ုခၠါင်

- Spoken in: Myanmar and Thailand

Eastern Yugur – ?

- Spoken in: Gansu, China

Ebira – èbìrà

- Spoken in: Middle Belt, Nigeria

Ebrié – Cama

- Spoken in: Abidjan Department, Ivory Coast and in Ghana

Ecclesiastical Latin – Latin

- Ecclesiastical Latin is a liturgical language used by the Catholic Church

Ecuadorian Sign Language – Lengua de señas ecuatoriana, Lengua de señas de Ecuador

- Signed in: Ecuador

Edo – Ẹ̀dó

- Spoken in: Edo State, Nigeria

Edolo – Edolo Ado

- Spoken in: Hela Province, Papua New Guinea

Edopi – Edopi

- Spoken in: Indonesia

Efe – Efé

- Spoken in: Ituri Rainforest, the Democratic Republic of the Congo

Efik – Usem Efịk

- Spoken in: Cross River State, Nigeria

Eggon – onumu Eggon

- Spoken in: Kaduna State, Nigeria

Egyptian Arabic – مصرى

- Spoken in: Egypt

Egyptian Sign Language – لغة الإشارة المصرية

- Signed in: Egypt

Eipo – Lik

- Spoken in: Bintang Mountains Regency, Highland Papua, Indonesia

Ejagham – Éjághám

- Spoken in: Nigeria and Cameroon

Ekajuk – Ekajuk

- Spoken in: Cross River State, Nigeria

Ekari – Mee

- Spoken in: Western Central Papua, Indonesia

Ekid – Eket

- Spoken in: Akwa Ibom State, Nigeria

Ekoka ǃKung – ǃXuun

- Spoken in: South Africa, originally also spoken in Angola

Ekpeye – ẹkpeye

- Spoken in: Rivers State, Nigeria

Elamite † – ?

- Formerly spoken in: Iran

Emai-Iuleha-Ora – Kunibum, Ivbiosakon

- Spoken in: Edo State, Nigeria

Emberá Catío – Ẽ́bẽra Katío

- Spoken in: Antioquia Department, Colombia; and Panama

Emberá Chamí – Ẽbẽra, Ẽbẽra bed̶ea

- Spoken in: Chocó Department, Colombia

Embu – Kîembu

- Spoken in: Embu County, Kenya

Emerillon – Teko

- Spoken in: French Guiana, France

Emilian – Emigliân, emigliàn

- Spoken in: Western Emilia-Romagna, Italy

Emilian–Romagnol – emigliàn e rumagnòl

- Spoken in: primarily in Emilia-Romagna, also in Marche, Italy and San Marino

Emirati Sign Language – لغة الإشارة الإماراتية

- Signed in: United Arab Emirates

Enawene Nawe – Salumã

- Spoken in: Mato Grosso, Brazil

Ende – ?

- Spoken in: central Flores, East Nusa Tenggara, Indonesia

Enets – Онэй база

- Spoken in: Krasnoyarsk Krai, Russia

Enga – Enga, kanakae pii

- Spoken in: Enga, Papua New Guinea

Engenni – Ẹgẹnẹ

- Spoken in: Bayelsa State and Rivers State, Nigeria

Enggano – ?

- Spoken in: Enggano Island, Bengkulu, Indonesia

English – English

- Official language in: 57 countries, 30 non-sovereign entities and 25 international organizations

Enlhet – Enlhet

- Spoken in: Presidente Hayes, Paraguay

Enu – Ximoluo

- Spoken in: Yunnan, China

Enxet – Énxet nempeywa

- Spoken in: Presidente Hayes, Paraguay

Eperara – epérã pedée, sía pedée

- Spoken in: Colombia, Ecuador and Panama

Eranadan – ഏറനാടൻ ഭാഷ, ا٘يرَناڊَن

- Spoken in: the region of Eranad in Malappuram district, Kerala, India

Eravallan – எரவல்லன்

- Spoken in: Kerala and Tamil Nadu, India

Eritrean Sign Language – Quwanquwa Mïlïkït Eritra

- Signed in: Eritrea

Erromintxela – Erromintxela

- Spoken by: the Romani in the Basque Country

Erzya – Эрзянь Kель

- Official language in: Mordovia, Russia

Esan – Ishan

- Spoken in: Nigeria

Ese – Ese

- Spoken in: Oro Province, Papua New Guinea

Ese Ejja – Eseꞌejja

- Official language in: Bolivia
- Also spoken in: Peru

Esimbi – Eshimbi

- Spoken in: Southwestern Cameroon

Esperanto – Esperanto

- International auxiliary language

Estonian – eesti keel

- Official language in: Estonia and the European Union

Estonian Sign Language – eesti viipekeel

- Signed in: Estonia

Eton – Ìtón

- Spoken in: Lekié, Centre Region, Cameroon

Eton (Vanuatu) – Feshan

- Spoken in: Vanuatu

Etruscan † – 𐌓𐌀𐌔𐌄𐌍𐌍𐌀

- Formerly spoken in: Central Italy

Eudeve † – Dóhmenerít

- Formerly spoken in: Sonora, Mexico

Europanto – Europanto

- Spoken in: the European Union

Even – эвэн, то̄рэ̄нни or эвэды

- Spoken in: Siberia

Evenki – Эвэды̄ турэ̄н

- Spoken in: the Chinese provinces of Heilongjiang and Inner Mongolia, the Mongolian aimag of the Selenge Province, and the Russian krai of Krasnoyarsk Krai

Ewe – Èʋe, Èʋegbe

- Spoken by: the Ewe people of Ghana and Togo

Ewondo – Beti

- Spoken in: Cameroon

Extremaduran – Estremeñu

- Spoken in: Salamanca and Extremadura in Spain

Eyak – dAxhunhyuuga’, Ịyạq

- Official language in: the American state of Alaska but is extinct while it is an official language of Alaska

Ezaa – Ezaa

- Spoken in: Cross River State, Nigeria

=== F ===
Fala – Fala, Nosa Fala

- Spoken in: Val de Xálima, Extremadura, Spain

Falam Chin – Lai ṭong

- Spoken in: Falam Township, Chin State, Myanmar

Fang – Faŋ, Paŋwe

- Recognised Minority Language in: Equatorial Guinea, Gabon, Cameroon, the Republic of the Congo, and São Tomé and Príncipe

Fang (Cameroon) – Fang

- Spoken in: Cameroon

Fante – Fante

- Spoken in: Ghana

Faroese – Føroyskt

- Official language in: Faroe Islands
- Recognised Minority Language in: Denmark

Faroese Sign Language – Føroyskt teknmál

- Signed in: Faroe Islands

Fataleka – Fataleka

- Spoken in: the Solomon Islands

Fataluku – ?

- Spoken in: Timor-Leste

Feʼfeʼ – Ghə̀ǝ̄ fèʼéfěʼè

- Spoken in: Haut-Nkam, Cameroon

Fiji Hindi – फिजी बात or Fiji Baat

- Official language in: Fiji

Fiji Sign Language – ?

- Signed in: Fiji

Fijian – Na vosa vaka-Viti, Vakaviti

- Official language in: Fiji

Filipino – Wikang Pilipino

- Official language in: the Philippines

Filipino Sign Language – Wikang pasenyas ng mga Pilipino

- Official language in: the Philippines

Fingallian † – Fingallian

- Formerly spoken in: Fingal, Ireland

Finland-Swedish Sign Language – Finlandssvenskt teckenspråk, Suomenruotsalainen viittomakieli

- Signed in: Finland

Finnish – suomi, suomen kieli

- Official language in: Finland and the European Union
- Recognised Minority Language in: Karelia, Russia and Sweden

Finnish Kalo Romani – kaalengo tšimb

- Spoken in: Finland and Sweden

Finnish Sign Language – Suomalainen viittomakieli

- Signed in: Finland

Flemish – Vlaams

- Spoken in: the Belgian region of Flanders

Flemish Sign Language – Vlaamse Gebarentaal

- Signed in: the Belgian region of Flanders

Foia Foia – Minanibai

- Spoken in: Gulf Province, Papua New Guinea

Fon – Fon gbè, Fɔngbè

- Spoken by: the Beninois/Nigerian Fon people

Foodo – Fóodo

- Recognised Minority Language in: Benin

Forak – Forak

- Spoken in: Madang Province, Papua New Guinea

Fordata – Vaidida

- Spoken in: Maluku, Indonesia

Fore – Kamana

- Spoken in: Morobe Province, Papua New Guinea

Forest Enets – Онэй базаан

- Spoken in: Krasnoyarsk Krai, Russia

Forest Nenets – нешаӈ вата

- Spoken in: Nenets Autonomous Okrug, Russia

Fox – Meskwakiatoweni

- Spoken by: the Meskwaki/Fox people

Frafra – Farefare

- Spoken in: Ghana and Burkina Faso

Frankish † – Frenkisk, Frankisk

- Formerly spoken in: Western Europe

French – français

- Official language in: 26 countries, 10 subnational entities, and 36 international organisations

French Belgian Sign Language – Langue des signes de Belgique francophone

- Signed in: the Belgian region of Wallonia

French Guianese Creole – Kriyòl gwiyannen

- Official language in: French Guiana, France

French Sign Language – Langue des signes française

- Signed in: France and Switzerland

Frisian (North) – Noordfreesk

- Official language in: the German archipelago of Heligoland and the German district of Nordfriesland

Frisian (Saterland) – Seeltersk

- Spoken in: the German municipality of Saterland

Frisian (West) – Frysk

- Official language in: the Dutch province of Friesland

Friulian – Furlan

- Spoken in: Friuli, Italy

Fula – Fulfulde, Pulaar, Pular

- Spoken in: West and Central Africa

Fuliiru – Kifuliiru

- Spoken in: the Democratic Republic of the Congo and Uganda

Fur – For

- Spoken in: Chad and Darfur, Sudan

Futuna-Aniwa – ?

- Spoken in: the islands of Futuna and Aniwa, Vanuatu

Futunan – Faka futuna

- Spoken in: Futuna, Wallis and Futuna, France

Fuyu Kyrgyz – Fuyü Gïrgïs, Gĭrgĭs

- Spoken in: Heilongjiang, China

Fwâi – ?

- Spoken in: Northern New Caledonia

=== G ===
Ga – Gã

- Official language in: Ghana

Ga'dang – Gaꞌdang

- Spoken in: Mountain Province, the Philippines

Gaddang – Gaddang

- Spoken in: Nueva Viscaya and Isabela, the Philippines

Gagauz – Gagauz

- Official language in: Gagauzia, Moldova
- Recognised Minority Language in: Ukraine

Gagnoa Bété – Bhete, Bhete Gbo

- Spoken in: Gagnoa, Ivory Coast

Gahuku – Alekano

- Spoken in: Eastern Highlands Province, Papua New Guinea

Galela – Galelaka

- Spoken in: North Maluku, Indonesia

Galician – Galego

- Official language in: the Spanish autonomous community of Galicia

Gallo – Galo

- Recognised Minority Language in: France mainly: Brittany, Normandy

Gallurese – gadduresu

- Recognised Minority Language in: Sardinia, Italy

Gamilaraay – Gamilaraay, Kamilaroi

- Spoken in: New South Wales, Australia

Gamit – ગામીત

- Spoken in: Gujarat, India

Gamo – Gamoththo

- Spoken in: the South West Ethiopia Peoples' Region, Ethiopia

Gan – 赣语, 贛語

- Spoken in: the Chinese provinces of Anhui, Fujian, Hubei, Hunan, and Jiangxi

Garhwali – गढ़वळि, गढ़वळि भाख

- Spoken in: Uttarakhand, India

Garifuna – Garífuna

- Recognised Minority Language in: Belize, and Guatemala
- Spoken in: Honduras, and Nicaragua

Garo – A·chikku, আ·চিক্কু

- Official language in: Meghalaya, India

Garre – اف الخرّيي

- Spoken in: Somalia, Ethiopia and Kenya

Gaulish † – ?

- Formerly spoken in: Gaul

Gawri – گاوری

- Spoken in: Behrain Tehsil, Pakistan

Gayo – Basa Gayo

- Spoken in: Sumatra, Indonesia

Gbaya – Gbaya

- Spoken in: the Central African Republic, the Democratic Republic of the Congo, the Republic of the Congo, and Cameroon

Gciriku – Gciriku, Dciriku, Rumanyo

- Spoken in: Namibia

Ge'ez – ግዕዝ

- Spoken in: Eritrea, Ethiopia, and Israel

Gen – Gɛn Gbe

- Spoken in: Benin and Togo

Georgian – ქართული

- Official language in: Georgia

Georgian Sign Language – ქართული ჟესტური ენა

- Signed in: Georgia

German – Deutsch

- Official language in: Austria, Belgium, Germany, Liechtenstein, Luxembourg, South Tyrol (Italy), Switzerland, and the European Union
- Recognised Minority Language in: the Brazilian city of Pomerode, the Czech Republic, Denmark, Hungary, the Italian autonomous province of Trentino, Kazakhstan, Namibia, Poland, Romania, Russia, the Slovak municipality of Krahule, and the Vatican City (Administrative and commanding language of the Swiss Guard)

German Sign Language – Deutsche Gebärdensprache

- Signed in: Germany, Luxembourg, and the German-speaking Community of Belgium

Ghadamès – Ghadāmis

- Spoken in: Ghadames, Libya

Ghanaian Pidgin – Kru Brofo

- Spoken in: Ghana

Ghomalaʼ – Ghɔmáláʼ

- Spoken in: West Region, Cameroon

Ghomara – ?

- Spoken in: Chefchaouen Province, Morocco

Gilaki – گیلٚکی زٚوان

- Spoken in: Gilan Province, Iran

Gilbertese – Taetae ni Kiribati

- Official language in: Kiribati

Gitonga – Gitonga

- Spoken in: Mozambique

Gitxsan – Gitxsanimaax, Gitxsanimx

- Spoken in: British Columbia, Canada

Godié – ‑Gwëjewälɩ

- Spoken in: Ivory Coast

Godoberi – ГъибдилӀи Mицци, Ɣibdiƛi Micci

- Spoken in: the southwest area of the Russian autonomous republic of Dagestan

Gofa – Goofatho, ጎፋꬆ

- Spoken in: the South West Ethiopia Peoples' Region, Ethiopia

Gogo – Wagogo

- Spoken in: Tanzania

Gokana – Gokana

- Spoken in: Nigeria

Golin – Golin ka

- Spoken in: Chimbu Province, Papua New Guinea

Gondi – गोण्डि, గోణ్డి

- Spoken in: India

Gongduk – དགོང་འདུས་

- Spoken in: Bhutan

Gooniyandi – Gooniyandi

- Spoken in: Western Australia, Australia

Gorani – گۆرانی

- Spoken in: Iraq and Iran

Gorontalo – Bahasa Hulontalo

- Spoken in: Gorontalo, Indonesia

Gothic † – 𐌲𐌿𐍄𐌹𐍃𐌺

- Formerly spoken in: pre-18th Century Europe

Gourmanché – gùlmàncéma, mìgùlmàncéma

- Spoken in: Burkina Faso, Togo, Benin, Niger, Ghana, and Nigeria

Gowli – गौली

- Spoken in: Madhya Pradesh and Maharashtra, India

Grebo – Kréébo

- Spoken in: Liberia

Greek – ελληνικά

- Official language in: Cyprus, Greece, and the European Union
- Recognised Minority Language in: Albania, Armenia, Hungary, Romania, Turkey, and Ukraine

Greek Sign Language – Ελληνική νοηματική γλώσσα

- Signed in: Greece

Greenlandic – Kalaallisut

- Official language in: Greenland

Greenlandic Sign Language – Ussersuataarneq

- Signed in: Greenland

Grenadian Creole English – Patois

- Spoken in: Grenada

Grenadian Creole French – Patwa

- Spoken in: Grenada

Gros Ventre † – 'ɔ'ɔ́ɔ́ɔ́naakíit'ɔ

- Formerly spoken in: Montana, United States

Guadeloupean Creole – ?

- Spoken in: Guadeloupe, as well as in Martinique

Guajajára – Ze’egete

- Spoken in: Maranhão, Brazil

Guanche † – ?

- Formerly spoken in: Canary Islands, Spain

Guaraní – Avañe'ẽ or Javy ju

- Official language in: the Argentinian province of Corrientes, Bolivia, and Paraguay
- Also spoken in: Mato Grosso do Sul, Brazil

Guarayu – Gwarayu

- Official language in: Bolivia

Guatemalan Sign Language – Lengua de señas guatemalteco

- Signed in: Guatemala

Guayabero – Jiwjame

- Spoken in: Meta and Guaviare departments, Colombia

Guernésiais – Guernésiais

- Official language in: Guernsey, the United Kingdom

Guerrero Amuzgo – Ñomndaa, Ñomndaa Suljaaꞌ

- Spoken in: Guerrero, Mexico

Guerrero Nahuatl – Nawatlajtoli

- Spoken in: Guerrero, Mexico

Guiberoua Bété – ʼbhɛtɩgbʋ ʼmö

- Spoken in: Guiberoua, Ivory Coast

Guinea-Bissau Creole – Ginensi, kiriol

- Spoken in: Guinea-Bissau

Guiyang Miao – Hmong

- Spoken in: Guizhou, China

Gujarati – ગુજરાતી

- Official language in: the Indian union territories of Dadra and Nagar Haveli and Daman and Diu, and the Indian state of Gujarat

Gujari – گوجری

- Spoken in: Jammu and Kashmir, India, Pakistan and Afghanistan

Gulf Arabic – خليجي ,اللهجة الخليجية

- Spoken in: Bahrain, Iran, Iraq, Kuwait, Oman, Qatar, Saudi Arabia, and United Arab Emirates

Gullah – Sea Island Creole English, Geechee

- Spoken in: South Carolina, United States

Gumbaynggirr – Gumbaynggirr, Gumbaingari, Kumbainggar, Kumbaingeri, Gambalamam

- Spoken in: New South Wales, Australia

Gumuz – Bega, Sa-Gumuz

- Spoken in: the Benishangul-Gumuz Region, Ethiopia, and Sudan

Gun – gungbe

- Official language in: Benin

Guna – Dulegaya

- Spoken in: Guna Yala, Panama, Colombia

Gunaikurnai – Gunai, Gunnai, Kurnai, Ganai, Gaanay, Kurnay, muk-thang

- Spoken in: Gippsland, Victoria, Australia

Gungu – Lugungu

- Spoken in: Uganda

Guro – Golo

- Spoken in: Ivory Coast

Gurung – तमु क्यी

- Official language in: Sikkim, India

Gusii – Ekegusii

- Spoken in: Kisii County, Kenya

Gusilay – Gusiilaay

- Spoken in: Southwestern Senegal

Guyanese Creole – Creolese

- Spoken in: Guyana

Gwich'in – Gwich'in

- Official language in: the Canadian federal territory of the Northwest Territories and the American state of Alaska

Gyalrong – རྒྱལ་རོང

- Spoken in: Sichuan, China

=== H ===
Hachijō – 島言葉

- Spoken in: Southern Izu Islands and the Daitō Islands, Japan

Hadhrami Arabic – اللهجة الحضرمية

- Spoken in: Hadhramaut, Yemen

Hadiyya – Hadiyyisa

- Spoken in: Ethiopia

Hadza – Hazane

- Spoken in: Tanzania

Haida – Xaat Kíl

- Official language in: the Council of the Haida Nation and the US state of Alaska

Hainanese – 海南話

- Spoken in: the Chinese province of Hainan

Haisla – X̄a'islak̓ala, X̌àh̓isl̩ak̓ala

- Spoken in: British Columbia, Canada

Haitian Creole – Kreyòl Ayisyen

- Official language in: Haiti

Haitian Sign Language – Langue des Signes Haïtienne

- Signed in: Haiti

Hakha Chin – Laiholh

- Spoken in: Myanmar, India and Bangladesh

Hakka – 客家話, 客家话

- Spoken by: the Hakka people

Hakö – Hakö

- Spoken in: Buka Island, Bougainville, Papua New Guinea

Halkomelem – Halq̓eméylem, Hul̓q̓umín̓um̓, hən̓q̓əmin̓əm̓

- Spoken in: Southwestern British Columbia, Canada, the United States

Hän – Häł gołan

- Official language in: Alaska, the United States

Hani – Haqniqdoq

- Spoken in: Laos, Myanmar, South China, and Vietnam

Hanunoo – Hanunó’o, ᜱᜨᜳᜨᜳᜢ

- Spoken in: Mindoro, the Philippines

Harari – ሃራሪ

- Spoken in: the Harari Region, Ethiopia

Haroi – Hơroi

- Spoken in: Southern Vietnam

Ḥarsusi – Ḥersīyet

- Spoken in: Oman

Haryanvi – हरयाणवी

- Spoken in: Haryana, India

Hassaniya Arabic – حسانية

- Official language in: Mali
- Recognised Minority Language in: Morocco and Senegal
- Also spoken in: Mauritania, Western Sahara, and Algeria

Hausa – هَرْشَن هَوْسَا, Harshen/Halshen Hausa

- Official language in: Niger
- National language in: Nigeria
- Recognised Minority Language in: Benin

Hawaiʻi Sign Language – ʻŌlelo Kuhi Lima Hawaiʻi

- Signed in: Hawaii, United States

Hawaiian – ʻŌlelo Hawaiʻi

- Official language in: Hawaii, United States

Hawaiian Pidgin – Hawaiʻi Creole English, Pidgin, ʻŌlelo Paʻi ʻAi

- Spoken in: Hawaii, United States

Hdi – Hdi

- Spoken in: Nigeria and Cameroon

Hebrew – עברית

- Official language in: Israel

Hehe – Kihehe

- Spoken in: Tanzania

Heiltsuk–Oowekyala – Híɫzaqv, ’Wuik̓ala

- Spoken in: British Columbia, Canada

Hejazi Arabic – حجازي ,اللهجة الحجازية

- Spoken in: Saudi Arabia

Hember Avu – Aregerek, Musar

- Spoken in: Madang Province, Papua New Guinea

Herero – Otjiherero

- Spoken in: Botswana and Namibia

Hidatsa – hiraaciré’

- Spoken in: North Dakota, Montana, the United States

Hiligaynon – Ilonggo

- Spoken in: the provinces of Iloilo and in Negros Occidental in the Philippines

Hill Mari – Мары йӹлмӹ

- Official language in: Mari El, Russia

Himarimã – Hi-Merima

- Spoken in: Amazonas, Brazil

Himba – Omuhimba, Simba

- Spoken in: Gabon

Hindi – हिन्दी

- Official language in: India and Fiji

Hindustani – ہندوستانی, हिन्दुस्तानी

- Spoken in: India and Pakistan

Hinuq – гьинузас мец

- Spoken in: Dagestan, Russia

Hiri Motu – Hiri Motu

- Official language in: Papua New Guinea

Hittite † – 𒌷𒉌𒅆𒇷, nešili

- Formerly spoken in: Anatolia, what is now Turkey

Hixkaryana – Hixkaryána

- Spoken in: Brazil

Hlai – ?

- Spoken in: Hainan, China

Hmong – lol Hmongb, lus Hmoob, lug Moob, 𖬌𖬣𖬵

- Spoken in: China, French Guiana, Thailand, United States, Vietnam, and Australia

Hmu – hveb Hmub

- Spoken in: Guizhou, China

Ho – 𑢹𑣉𑣉 𑣎𑣋𑣜, हो जगर, ହୋ ଜାଗାର, হো জাগার

- Official language in: Jharkhand, India

Ho-Chunk – Hoocą́k hoit'éra

- Spoken in: Nebraska, United States

Hobyót – Weyheybyot

- Spoken in: Yemen and Oman

Hodï – Jojodö tjįwęnę

- Spoken in: central Venezuela

Hoia Hoia – Hoyahoya

- Spoken in: Western Province, Papua New Guinea

Holikachuk – Doogh Qinag

- Official language in: Alaska, the United States

Honduran Sign Language – Lengua de señas hondureña

- Signed in: Honduras

Hong Kong Sign Language – 香港手語

- Signed in: Hong Kong, China

Hopi – Hopilàvayi or Hopílavayi

- Spoken in: the northeastern area of Arizona, United States

Hruso – Aka, Angka(e)

- Spoken in: Arunachal Pradesh, India

Huambisa – Wampís

- Spoken in: Peru

Huastec – Téenek

- Spoken in: San Luis Potosí, Mexico

Huasteca Nahuatl – Mexkatl

- Spoken in: the Mexican states of San Luis Potosí, Hidalgo, Puebla, Veracruz

Huave – Ombeayiiüts, Umbeyajts

- Spoken in: Oaxaca, Mexico

Huaylas Quechua – Nunashimi, Qichwa

- Spoken in: the Callejón de Huaylas and in the western slope of the Cordillera Negra, Peru

Huichol – Wixárika, Wixárika Niukiyari

- Spoken in: Nayarit, Mexico

Huilliche – Huillichesungun

- Recognized Minority Language in: Chile

Huishui Miao – Mhong

- Spoken in: Guizhou, China

Huizhou – 徽州话

- Spoken in: Chinese provinces of Anhui, Zhejiang and Jiangxi

Hulaulá – לשנא נשן

- Spoken in: Israel and Iran

Hungarian – magyar nyelv

- Official language in: Hungary, Vojvodina (Serbia), and the European Union
- Recognised Minority Language in: Burgenland (Austria), Croatia, Czech Republic, Transylvania (Romania), Slovakia, Prekmurje (Slovenia), and Ukraine

Hungarian Sign Language – Magyar jelnyelv

- Signed in: Hungary

Hunsrik – Hunsrik, Hunsrückisch or Hunsrickisch

- Official language in: the Brazilian municipalities of Antônio Carlos and São João do Oeste in Santa Catarina, and Santa Maria do Herval in Rio Grande do Sul, Brazil

Hunzib – гьонкьос мыц

- Spoken in: Southern Dagestan, Russia

Hupa † – Na꞉tinixwe Mixine꞉wheʼ

- Formerly spoken in: California, United States

Hutterite German – Hutterisch

- Spoken by: Hutterites in Canada and the United States

Hyam – Jaba

- Spoken in: Kaduna State, Nigeria

=== I ===
Iaai – ?

- Official language in: Ouvéa, New Caledonia

Iatê – Yaa:thê

- Spoken in: Pernambuco, Brazil

Iban – Jaku Iban

- Spoken in: Malaysia, Brunei and Indonesia

Ibanag – Ybanag, Ibanak

- Regional language in: the Philippines

Ibani – Ịḅanị

- Spoken in: Rivers State, Nigeria

Ibibio – Usem Ibibio

- Spoken in: Abia State, Akwa Ibom State, Rivers State and Cross River State, Nigeria

Icelandic – íslenska

- Official language in: Iceland

Icelandic Sign Language – Íslenskt táknmál

- Signed in: Iceland

Ido – Ido

- International auxiliary language

Ifè – Ifɛ̀

- Spoken in: Benin and Togo

Igala – Igala

- Spoken in: Nigeria

Igbo – Asụsụ Igbo

- Official language in: Nigeria
- Recognised Minority Language in: Equatorial Guinea

Iha – ?

- Spoken in: West Papua, Indonesia

Ik – Icetot

- Spoken in: Uganda

Ikwerre – Ikwerre

- Spoken in: Rivers State, Nigeria

Ili Turki – İlı turkeşi, И̇лı туркес̧и, ي̇لي تۋركەسي

- Spoken in: Xinjiang, China

Ilocano – Iloko, Pagsasao nga Iloko

- Official language in: the Philippine province of La Union

Ilwana – Kiwilwana

- Spoken in: Tana River District, Kenya

Imperial Aramaic † – 𐡀𐡓𐡌𐡉𐡀

- Formerly spoken in: Ancient Near East

Iñapari – ?

- Spoken in: Madre de Dios, Peru

Indonesian – Bahasa Indonesia

- Official language in: Indonesia

Indonesian Sign Language – Bahasa Isyarat Indonesia

- Signed in: Indonesia

Indo-Pakistani Sign Language – ?

- Signed in: India, Pakistan, and Bangladesh

Ingrian – ižoran keeli

- Spoken in: Ingria, Russia

Ingush – ГӀалгӀай мотт

- Official language in: the Russian autonomous republic of Ingushetia

Interlingua – Interlingua

- International auxiliary language

Interlingue (Occidental) – Interlingue

- International auxiliary language

Interslavic – Medžuslovjansky, Меджусловјанскы

- Zonal auxiliary language for Slavs

Inuinnaqtun – ᐃᓄᐃᓐᓇᖅᑐᓐ

- Official language in: Northwest Territories and Nunavut in Canada

Inuit Sign Language – Atgangmuurngniq, ᐊᑦᒐᖕᒨᕐᖕᓂᖅ or ᐆᒃᑐᕋᐅᓯᖏᑦ

- Signed in: Nunavut in Canada

Inuktitut – ᐃᓄᒃᑎᑐᑦ

- Official language in: the Canadian provinces of the Northwest Territories and Nunavut; the Nunavik area of the Canadian province of Quebec; and the Canada-administrated/Inuit-claimed autonomous area of Nunatsiavut

Inupiaq – Iñupiatun

- Official language in: the American state of Alaska

Inuvialuktun – Inuvialuktun

- Official language in: Northwest Territories, Canada

Iowa-Otoe-Missouria † – Báxoje-Jíwere-Nyútʼachi, Báxoje ich'é, Jíwere ich'é

- Formerly spoken in: Oklahoma, Missouri, and Kansas, United States

Ipalapa Amuzgo – Jñunda

- Spoken in: Oaxaca, Mexico

Iraqi Arabic – اللهجة العراقية

- Spoken in: Iraq, as well as in Syria, Turkey, and Iran

Iraqi Sign Language – لغة الإشارة العراقية

- Signed in: Iraq

Iraqw – Kángw Iraqw

- Spoken in: Tanzania

Irish – Gaeilge

- Official language in: the Republic of Ireland, Northern Ireland, the United Kingdom, and the European Union

Irish Sign Language – Teanga Chomharthaíochta na hÉireann

- Official language in: the Republic of Ireland

Isan – ภาษาลาว, ພາສາລາວ

- Recognised Minority Language in: Thailand

Isoko – Isoko

- Spoken in: Nigeria

Israeli Sign Language – שפת הסימנים הישראלית

- Signed in: Israel

Isthmus Nahuatl – Mela'tájtol

- Spoken in: the Mexican states of Tabasco and Veracruz

Isthmus Zapotec – diidxazá

- Spoken in: Oaxaca, Mexico

Istriot – Eîstrioto, Lèngua Eîstriota

- Spoken in: Istria County, Croatia

Istro-Romanian – Istroromånă

- Recognised Minority Language in: Istria County, Italy, Sweden, Germany and North America and South America

Italian – italiano, lingua italiana

- Official language in: the Croatian Istria County, Italy, San Marino, the Slovenian Slovene Istria, the Sovereign Military Order of Malta, Switzerland, the Vatican City, and the European Union
- Recognised Minority Language in: Argentina, Bosnia and Herzegovina, Brazil (6 municipalities), Croatia, Romania, and Slovenia

Italian Sign Language – Lingua dei Segni Italiana

- Signed in: Italy, San Marino, and Switzerland

Itelmen – итэнмэн

- Spoken in: Kamchatka Krai in Russia

Itzaʼ – Itzaʼ

- Spoken in: Guatemala

Iu Mien – Iu Mienh

- Spoken in: China, Vietnam, Laos, Thailand, Communities in United States, and France

Ivatan – Chirin nu Ibatan

- Spoken in: Batanes, Philippines

Ixil – Ixhil

- Spoken in: Guatemala, as well as Campeche, Mexico

Izere – Izarek

- Spoken in: Kaduna State, Bauchi State, and Plateau State, Nigeria

Izon – Ịzọn

- Spoken in: Rivers State, Bayelsa State, Delta State, Ondo State, and Edo State, Nigeria

=== J ===
Jah Hut – Jah Het

- Spoken in: Pahang, Malaysia

Jakaltek – Abxubal, Abꞌxubꞌal Poptiꞌ

- Spoken in: Huehuetenango Department, Guatemala, Mexico

Jalaa † – bàsàrə̀n dà jàlààbè̩

- Formerly spoken in: Nigeria

Jamaican Country Sign Language – Konchri Sain

- Signed in: Saint Elizabeth Parish, Jamaica

Jamaican Patois – Patwa

- Spoken in: Jamaica

Jamaican Sign Language – Jamaican Sign Language

- Signed in: Jamaica

Jambi Malay – bahaso Jambi, baso Jambi, بهاس جمبي

- Spoken in: Jambi, Indonesia

Jamtlandic – jamska

- Spoken in: Jämtland, Sweden

Japanese – 日本語

- Official language in: Angaur, Palau
- National language in: Japan

Japanese Sign Language – 日本手話

- Signed in: Japan

Jarai – Tơlơi Jrai

- Spoken in: Central Highlands, Vietnam and Ratanakiri province, Cambodia

Jarawa – Aongəŋ

- Official language in: Andaman and Nicobar Islands

Jaunsari – जोनसारी

- Spoken in: Uttarakhand, India

Javanese – ꦧꦱꦗꦮ

- Spoken in: the Indonesian islands of Borneo and Java, New Caledonia, and Suriname

Javindo – Javindo

- Spoken in: Java, Indonesia

Jawoyn – Djauan

- Spoken in: Northern Territory, Australia

Jeju – 제줏말, 제주말

- Spoken in: Jeju Province, South Korea

Jèrriais – Jèrriais

- Official language in: Jersey, the United Kingdom

Jicarilla – Abáachi mizaa

- Spoken in: New Mexico, the United States

Jijili – Tanjijili

- Spoken in: Niger State, Nigeria

Jili – Lijili

- Spoken in: Nasarawa State, Nigeria

Jin – 晋语

- Spoken in: Chinese provinces of Shanxi, Hebei, Henan and Shaanxi; Chinese autonomous region of Inner Mongolia

Jju – Du̱ryem Jju

- Spoken in: Kaduna State, Nigeria

Jola-Felupe – Djola-Felupe

- Spoken in: Guinea-Bissau and Senegal

Jola-Fonyi – Jóola fóoñi

- Spoken in: Senegal and The Gambia

Jola-Kasa – Jóola Kaasa

- Spoken in: Senegal

Jordanian Sign Language – لغا الإشارات الاردنية

- Signed in: Jordan

Juang – ଜୁଆଙ୍

- Spoken in: Southern Keonjhar, northern Angul, and eastern Dhenkanal districts, Odisha, India

Juba Arabic – arabi juba, luġa

- Spoken in: South Sudan

Judaeo-Georgian – ყივრული

- Spoken in: Georgia, Israel, Russia, Belgium, and United States

Judaeo-Spanish – גֿודֿיאו-איספאנייול, Ladino

- Spoken by: the Sephardim Jewish Diaspora

Judeo-Arabic – ערבית יהודית

- Spoken by: Jews in North Africa and the Fertile Crescent

Judeo-Persian – Fārsi

- Spoken by: Jews in Iran and Central Asia

Judeo-Tat – Cuhuri, Жугьури, ז׳אוּהאוּראִ

- Spoken in: Azerbaijan, Russia, Israel and the United States

Jumjum – Tüŋ Mäbaan

- Spoken in: South Sudan and Sudan

Jumli – खस जुम्ली

- Spoken in: Nepal

Jutish – Jydsk

- Spoken in: Denmark

Juǀʼhoan – ǃXun, Ju

- Spoken in: northeastern Namibia and northwestern Botswana near the border with Angola

=== K ===
Ka’apor – Kaapor, awa je’ẽha

- Spoken in: Maranhão, Brazil

Kaansa – Kã́asa

- Spoken in: Burkina Faso

Kabardian – Адыгэбзэ

- Official language in: the Russian autonomous republics of Kabardino-Balkaria and Karachay-Cherkessia

Kabiye – kabɩyɛ

- Official language in: Togo
- Recognised Minority Language in: Benin

Kabyle – ⵜⴰⵇⴱⴰⵢⵍⵉⵜ / ثاقبايليث

- Spoken in: Algeria

Kachin – ဈိာင်ဖေါစ်, Jinghpaw ga

- Official language in: Kachin State, Myanmar and Yingjiang County, China
- Also spoken in: other parts of Myanmar, China, and in India

Kadazandusun – Kadazan Dusun

- Spoken in: Sabah, Malaysia

Kaingang – Kanhgág

- Spoken in: Paraná, Brazil

Kaitag – хайдакьан кув

- Spoken in: Dagestan, Russia

Kaiwá – Kaiowa

- Spoken in: Mato Grosso do Sul, Brazil, and northeastern Argentina

Kaixana – Kawishana, Cawishana

- Spoken in: Brazil

Kalabari – Kalaḇari Bibi

- Spoken in Rivers State, Nigeria

Kalanga – TjiKalanga/Ikalanga

- Official language in: Zimbabwe

Kalau Lagau Ya – Mabuiag

- Spoken in: Western and Central Torres Strait Islands, Queensland, Australia

Kalenjin – Kalenjin

- Spoken in: Western Kenya, Eastern Uganda, and Northern Tanzania

Kalinago † – Kalhíphona

- Formerly spoken in: Guadeloupe, Dominica, Martinique, Saint Lucia, Saint Vincent and the Grenadines, and Grenada

Kalispel-Pend d’Oreille – Nqlispélišcn, Séliš

- Spoken in: Montana, the United States

Kalmyk – хальмг келн

- Official language in: the Russian autonomous republic of Kalmykia

Kalumpang – Kalumpang

- Spoken in: West Sulawesi, Indonesia

Kamba – Kikamba

- Spoken in: Kenya and Tanzania

Kanakanavu – Kanakanabu

- Spoken in: Maya Village in Namasia District, Kaohsiung, Taiwan

Kanauji – देहाती

- Spoken in: Uttar Pradesh, India

Kanembu – كَنٜݦُ

- Spoken in: Chad

Kangri – 𑚊𑚭𑚫𑚌𑚪𑚯, कांगड़ी

- Spoken in: Himachal Pradesh and Punjab, India

Kanikkaran – கணிக்காரன், കണ്ണിക്കാരൻ

- Spoken in: Tamil Nadu, India

Kannada – ಕನ್ನಡ

- Official language in: the Indian state of Karnataka

Kansa † – Káⁿza

- Formerly spoken in: Kansas, the United States

Kanuri – Kanuri

- Spoken in: Cameroon, Chad, Niger, and Nigeria

Kapampangan – Kapampangan

- Spoken in: Pampanga, Philippines

Kaqchikel – Kaqchikel Chʼabʼäl

- Spoken in: Guatemala

Karachay-Balkar – къарачай-малкъар тил, qaraçay-malqar til

- Official language in: the Russian autonomous republics of Kabardino-Balkaria and Karachay-Cherkessia
- Also spoken in: Turkey

Karai-karai – كاراي-كاراي

- Spoken in: Bauchi State, Yobe State, and Gombe State, Nigeria

Karaim – къарай тили

- Recognised Minority Language in: Poland, Ukraine and Russia

Karakalpak – Қарақалпақ тили, Qaraqalpaq tili

- Official language in: Karakalpakstan, Uzbekistan

Karakhanid † – Türki, Türkçe

- Formerly spoken in: Kara-Khanid Khanate

Karamojong – ŋaKaramojoŋ or ŋaKarimojoŋ

- Spoken in: the Moroto District, Karamoja Sub-Region, Northern Region, Uganda

Karata – К̄ӀирлӀе мац̄Ӏи

- Spoken in: Dagestan, Russia

Karbi – Arlêng

- Spoken in: Assam, Meghalaya and Arunachal Pradesh, India

Karelian – Karjalan Kieli

- Recognised Minority Language in: Finland, Russia

Karen – ကညီကျိာ်

- Spoken in: Kayin State, Myanmar and Thailand

Karenni – ꤊꤢꤛꤢ꤭ ꤜꤟꤤ꤬

- Spoken in: Kayah State, Myanmar, Thailand, United States

Karian – Bilakura

- Spoken in: Madang Province, Papua New Guinea

Karipuna † – Jaũn Àvo

- Formerly spoken in: Rondônia, Brazil

Karipúna French Creole – Lanc-Patuá, Patua

- Spoken in: Amapá, Brazil

Karok – Káruk

- Spoken in: California, the United States

Kashmiri – كٲشُر, कॉशुर, Kạ̄šur, Koshur

- Official language in: India

Kashubian – Kaszëbsczi Jãzëk

- Official language in: Some communes in the Polish voivodeship of Pomerania

Kaska – Dene Zágéʼ

- Spoken in: British Columbia, Canada

Kassonke – Xaasongaxango

- Official language in: Mali

Kâte – Kâte dâŋ

- Spoken in: Morobe Province, Papua New Guinea

Katë – كته

- Spoken in: Khyber Pakhtunkhwa, Pakistan; and Afghanistan

Kaurna – Kaurna Warra

- Spoken in: South Australia, Australia

Kavalan – kbaran, kebalan

- Spoken in: Taiwan

Kawésqar – Kawésqar, Qawasqar

- Spoken in: Chile

Kawi † – ᬚᬯ

- Formerly spoken in: the island of Java in Indonesia

Kayan – Kayǎn, Kayǎn tamangaò̌

- Recognised Minority Language in: Shan State, Myanmar
- Note: There are several languages called "Kayan", 1 in Papua New Guinea, and 7 in Indonesia, there is a total of 9 languages called "Kayan".
- Note 2: There are several Kayan languages in Indonesia, and Wahau.

Kayapó – Mẽbêngôkre kabẽn

- Spoken in: Pará, Brazil

Kaytetye – Kaititj, Gaididj, Kaiditj, Kaytej

- Spoken in: Northern Territory, Australia

Kazakh – қазақша, қазақ тілі, qazaqşa, qazaq tılı, قازاقشا, قازاق ٴتىلى

- Official language in: Kazakhstan, Altai Republic (Russia), Ili Kazakh Autonomous Prefecture, Barköl Kazakh Autonomous County, Mori Kazakh Autonomous County, and Aksay Kazakh Autonomous County (China)

Kedah Malay – بهاس ملايو قدح, ภาษามลายูไทรบุรี, Pelat Utagha

- Spoken in: the Malaysian states of Kedah, Penang, Perlis, and the northern area of Perak

Kelabit – Kelabit

- Spoken in: Sarawak, Malaysia, Indonesia

Kelantanese Malay – بهاس ملايو كلنتن or Baso Kelate

- Spoken in: Kelantan, Malaysia

Kemedzung – Díɛ yi Bədzumbu lə, Kɨmədzuŋ

- Spoken in: Nord-Ouest Region, Cameroon

Kendayan – Kendayan

- Spoken in: Sarawak, Malaysia, Indonesia

Kendeje – Kendeje

- Spoken in: Ouaddaï Region, Chad

Kenyah – Bakung

- Spoken in: North Kalimantan, Indonesia, Malaysia

Kenyan Sign Language – Kenyan Sign Language

- Signed in: Kenya and Somalia

Keoru-Ahia – Keuru, Keoru, Kouri, Ahia

- Spoken in: Gulf Province, Papua New Guinea

Kerek † – аӈӄалҕакку

- Formerly spoken in: Chukotka Autonomous Okrug, Russia

Keres – ?

- Spoken in: New Mexico, the United States

Ket – Остыганна ӄа'

- Spoken in: the middle Yenisei basin in Krasnoyarsk Krai in Russia

Kgalagadi – SheKgalagadi

- Spoken in: Botswana

Khakas – Хакас Tілі

- Spoken in: the Russian autonomous republic of Khakassia

Khalaj – خلج

- Spoken in: Iran

Khaling – खालिङ

- Spoken in: Solukhumbu and Khotang districts, Nepal

Khanty – ханты

- Spoken in: Khanty-Mansi, Yamalo-Nenets and Tomsk Oblast in Russia

Kharia – खड़िया, ଖଡ଼ିଆ, Khaɽiyā

- Official language in: Jharkhand, India

Khasi – Ka Ktien Khasi, ক ক্ত্যেন খসি

- Official language in: Meghalaya, India

Khetrani – ?

- Spoken in: Balochistan, Pakistan

Khinalug – каьтш мицI, kätš micʼ

- Spoken in: Azerbaijan

Khitan † –,

- Formerly spoken in: China, Mongolia, and eastern Siberia, Russia

Khmer – ភាសាខ្មែរ

- Official language in: Cambodia

Khmu – Kmhmu

- Spoken in: Laos, Vietnam, Thailand, China

Khoekhoe – Khoekhoegowab

- National language in: Namibia

Khoemana – Griqua, Korana, ǃOra, Kora, Xri, ǃOrakobab

- Spoken in: South Africa

Khorasani Turkic – خراسان تركچیسی

- Spoken in: North Khorasan Province, Iran

Khortha – खोरठा

- Official language in: Jharkhand, India

Khowar – کھوار

- Spoken in: Chitral, Pakistan

Khwarshi – аᴴкьи́зас мыц

- Spoken in: Southwestern Dagestan, Russia

Kʼicheʼ – Qatzijobʼal

- Official language in: Mexico
- Recognised Minority Language in: Guatemala

Kichwa – Kichwa Shimi, Runa Shimi

- Recognised Minority Language in: Ecuador

Kickapoo – Metotheeneniaatoweeheni, Kikapú

- Spoken in: Kansas, Oklahoma, and Texas, the United States, and Coahuila, Mexico

Kiga – Orukiga

- Spoken in: Uganda and Rwanda

Kikai – しまゆみた

- Spoken in: Kagoshima Prefecture, Japan

Kikuyu – Gĩkũyũ

- Spoken in: the Kenyan Central Province

Kiliwa – ?

- Spoken in: Baja California, Mexico

Kim – Garab

- Spoken in: Chad

Kim Mun – Kem di mun, Kim Mun

- Spoken in: Yunnan and Guangxi, China

Kimbundu – Kimbundu

- Official language in: Angola

Kimki – Sukubatom

- Spoken in: Highland Papua, Indonesia

Kinaray-a – Kinaray-a

- Regional language in: the Philippines

Kinnauri – 𑚊𑚝𑚦𑚤𑚮𑚎𑚨𑚶𑚊𑚛, Kanawaringskad, ཀནབརིངསྐད

- Spoken in: Himachal Pradesh, India

Kinyarwanda – Ikinyarwanda or Runyarwanda

- Official language in: Rwanda

Kiowa – Ǥáuiđòᵰ꞉gyà, [Gáuiđòñ꞉gyà

- Spoken in: Oklahoma, the United States

Kishtwari – کشتواڑی, किश्तवाड़ी

- Spoken in: Jammu and Kashmir, India

Kisi – Kikɨsi

- Spoken in: Tanzania

Kituba – Monokutuba, Munukutuba, Kituba, Kikongo ya leta

- Official language in: the Democratic Republic of the Congo and the Republic of the Congo

Klallam † – nəxʷsƛ̕ay̕əmúcən

- Formerly spoken in: Washington, the United States

Klingon – tlhIngan Hol,  

- Constructed language spoken by a fictional alien race called the Klingons in the Star Trek universe

Koalib – Kwɐ̀ɐlîp

- Spoken in: Southern Sudan

Koasati – Koasati

- Spoken in: Louisiana, the United States

Koch – কচ' কৰ'

- Spoken in: India and Bangladesh

Kodava – ಕೊಡವ ತಕ್ಕ್ கூடகு எழுத்து

- Spoken in: Karnataka, India

Kodaku – कोड़ाकु

- Spoken in: India

Kogi – Kaugiañ

- Spoken in: Magdalena Department, Colombia

Kohistani – کوستَیں

- Spoken in: Pakistan

Kohistani Shina – ݜݨیاٗ کستِین٘و زبان ,ݜݨیاٗ زبان

- Spoken in: Pakistan

Kokborok – ককবরক

- Official language in: Tripura, India

Kol – হর

- Spoken in: Bangladesh

Kola – Kola

- Spoken in: Maluku, Indonesia

Kombio – Akwun

- Spoken in: East Sepik Province, Papua New Guinea

Komering – Basa Kumoring, باس كوموريڠ

- Spoken in: South Sumatra, Indonesia

Komi – Коми

- Official language in: Komi Republic, Russia

Komi-Permyak – коми-пермяцкӧй кыв

- Spoken in: Perm Krai, Russia

Kongo – Kikongo

- Spoken in: the Democratic Republic of the Congo, Angola, the Republic of the Congo and Gabon

Konjo – Olhukonzo, Lhukonzo, Olukonzo, Konzo

- Spoken in: Uganda and the Democratic Republic of the Congo

Konkani – कोंकणी, Konknni, കൊങ്കണി, ಕೊಂಕಣಿ

- Official language in: the Indian state of Goa

Konkomba – Likpakpaanl

- Spoken in: Ghana and Togo

Korean – 한국어, 조선어

- Official language in: North Korea, South Korea, Yanbian Korean Autonomous Prefecture and Changbai Korean Autonomous County, China

Korean Sign Language – 한국 수화 언어

- Official language in: South Korea

Korku – कोर्कू

- Spoken in: Madhya Pradesh, India

Koro – Koro-Aka

- Spoken in: Arunachal Pradesh, India

Korop – Durop

- Spoken in: Cross River State, Nigeria

Koryak – нымылан

- Spoken in: Koryak Okrug, Kamchatka Krai, Russia

Kosovar Sign Language – Gjuha e Shenjave Kosovare

- Signed in: Kosovo

Kosraean – Kosrae

- Official language in: Kosrae in Micronesia

Kotava – Kotava

- International auxiliary language

Koyraboro Senni – كࣷيْرَبࣷرࣷ سٜنِّ

- Spoken in: east of Timbuktu, Azawad, Mali

Koyukon – Denaakkenaageʼ, Denaakkʼe, Dinaak̲'a

- Official language in: Alaska, the United States

Kpelle – Kpɛlɛwoo

- Spoken in: Liberia, Guinea and Ivory Coast

Kposo – Ikpɔsɔ

- Spoken in: Togo and Ghana

Kresh – Gbäyä

- Spoken in: Sudan and South Sudan
- Note: The language is also known as "Gbaya" and is not to be confused with the Gbaya macrolanguage.

Krio – Krio

- Spoken in: Sierra Leone

Krio Dayak – Kereho

- Spoken in: West Kalimantan, Indonesia

Krymchak – кърымчах тыльы

- Recognised Minority Language in: Ukraine

Kryts – кърыцIаь мез, ġrəċä mez, qryc’ä mez

- Spoken in: Azerbaijan

Kuanua – Tinata Tuna

- Spoken in: East New Britain Province in Papua New Guinea

Kubachi – Гӏугъбуган

- Spoken in: Southern Dagestan, Russia

Kuliak – Rub

- Spoken in: Uganda

Kulino – Kulina Pano

- Spoken in: Amazonas, Brazil

Kumaoni – कुमाऊँनी

- Spoken in: Uttarakhand, India and Sudurpashchim Province, Nepal

Kumeyaay – Kumiai

- Spoken in: California, the United States, Mexico

Kumyk – Къумукъ Tил

- Official language in: the Russian autonomous republic of Dagestan

Kunama – Baada, Baazayn, Diila

- Spoken in: Eritrea and Ethiopia

Kunigami – 山原言葉, ヤンバルクトゥーバ

- Spoken in: Okinawa Prefecture, Japan

Kunza † – Likanantaí, Ckunsa

- Formerly spoken in: Chile and Peru

Kurdish – Kurdî, کوردی

- Official language in: Kurdistan Region and Iraq
- Recognised Minority Language in: Armenia and Syria
- Also spoken in: Turkey, Iran, and Azerbaijan

Kurdish (Southern) – کوردی خوارین, Kurdîy Xwarîn

- Spoken in: Iran and Iraq

Kurdish Sign Language – Zmani Hêmay Kurdi

- Signed in: Kurdistan Region, Iraq

Kurmali – কুড়মালি, কুর্মালী, कुड़मालि, कुरमालि, କୁଡ଼ମାଲି, पंचपरगनिया, পঞ্চপরগনিয়া

- Official language in: Jharkhand and West Bengal, India

Kurmanji – Kurmancî, کورمانجی

- Spoken in: Turkey, Iran, Iraq, and Syria

Kurukh – कुँड़ुख़, কুড়ুখ্, କୁଡ଼ୁଖ୍

- Spoken in: India, Bangladesh and Nepal

Kusaal – Kʋsaal

- Spoken in: Ghana, Burkina Faso, and Togo

Kusunda – Gemehaq gipan

- Spoken in: Nepal

Kutchi – کچھی or કચ્છી

- Spoken in: Kutch, India

Kutenai – Ktunaxa

- Spoken in: the United States and Canada

Kuvi – కువి

- Spoken in: Andhra Pradesh, India

Kuwaiti Arabic – كويتي

- Spoken in: Kuwait

Kuwaiti Sign Language – لغة الاشارة الكويتية

- Signed in: Kuwait

Kwadi † – ǃKwaǀtse

- Formerly spoken in: Angola

Kwakʼwala – Kwak̓wala

- Spoken in: British Columbia, Canada

Kwangali – RuKwangali

- Spoken in: Namibia

Kwaraqae – Fiu

- Spoken in: Malaita, Solomon Islands

Kwaza – Tsẽtsitswa

- Spoken in: Rondônia, Brazil

Kwerba – Kwerba

- Spoken in: Papua, Indonesia

Kwerba Mamberamo – Kwerba Mamberamo Nopukw

- Spoken in: Mamberamo Raya Regency, Papua, Indonesia

Kyrgyz – Кыргыз тили

- Official language in: Kyrgyzstan and Kizilsu Kyrgyz Autonomous Prefecture, China

=== L ===
Láá Láá Bwamu – Làa làa Bũamu

- Spoken in: Burkina Faso

Láadan – Láadan

- A gynocentric constructed language

Laal – yəw láà:l

- Spoken in: Chad

Laalaa – Kelaalaa

- Spoken in: Senegal

Laarim – Narim

- Spoken in: South Sudan

Lacandon – Jach-tʼaan

- Spoken in: Chiapas, Mexico

Ladakhi – ལ་དྭགས་སྐད།

- Spoken in: Tibet, China, Ladakh, India, and Gilgit-Baltistan, Pakistan

Ladin – Ladin

- Spoken in: Italy

Lahu – Ladhof

- Official language in: Lancang Lahu Autonomous County, Yunnan, China
- Also spoken in: Thailand, Laos and Myanmar

Lak – лакку маз

- Official language in: Dagestan, Russia

Lakha – ལ་ཁ་

- Spoken in: Wangdue Phodrang and Trongsa, Bhutan

Laki – لەکی, Lekî

- Spoken in: Iran and Turkey

Lakon – Lakona, Vure

- Spoken in: Gaua, Vanuatu

Lakota – Lakȟótiyapi

- Spoken by: the Lakota people

Lalana Chinantec – ju²³jmii²³²

- Spoken in: the border of the states of Oaxaca, in Mexico

Lama – Lamba

- Recognised Minority Language in: Benin

Lamaholot – Lamaholot, Solor

- Spoken in: Flores and Solor, East Nusa Tenggara, Indonesia

Lamalama – Mbarrumbathama, Mba Rumbathama

- Spoken in: Queensland, Australia

Lamba – Ichilamba

- Spoken in: Zambia and the Democratic Republic of the Congo

Lambadi – लंबाडी, ಲಂಬಾಣಿ, லம்பாடி, లంబాణి

- Spoken by: the Banjara in India

Lambya – Ichilambya

- Spoken in: Tanzania and Malawi

Lamkang – Ksen

- Spoken in: Manipur, India

Lamnso’ – Lǎm Nso’

- Spoken in: Cameroon

Lampung – cawa Lampung

- Spoken in: Lampung, Indonesia

Lango (South Sudan) – Laŋgo

- Spoken in: South Sudan

Lango (Uganda) – Lëblaŋo

- Spoken in: Lango sub-region, Uganda

Lao – ພາສາລາວ

- Official language in: Laos

Lapaguía Zapotec – ?

- Spoken in: Oaxaca, Mexico

Lapine – Lapine

- Constructed language spoken by the rabbits in the film Watership Down

Laragiya – Gulumoerrgin

- Spoken in: Northern Territory, Australia

Lardil – Leerdil

- Spoken in: Queensland, Australia

Lashi – လချစ်, Lacid

- Spoken in: Myanmar and China

Lasi – لاسی

- Spoken in: Lasbela, Pakistan

Latgalian – latgalīšu volūda

- Spoken in: Latvia

Latin – lingua Latina, Latinum

- Official language in: the Vatican City
- Formerly spoken in: Latium, Ancient Rome, the Roman Republic, Roman Empire, and in court

Latvian – latviešu valoda

- Official language in: Latvia and the European Union

Latvian Sign Language – Latviešu zīmju valoda

- Signed in: Latvia

Lau – Lau

- Spoken in: Malaita, the Solomon Islands

Laz – ლაზური ნენა, Lazuri Nena

- Spoken in: Georgia and Turkey

Leco – Burua

- Official language in: Bolivia

Ledo Kaili – Kaili-Ledo

- Spoken in: Central Sulawesi, Indonesia

Lega – Kilɛga

- Spoken in: the Democratic Republic of the Congo

Leizhou Min – 雷州话, 雷州話

- Spoken in: Leizhou Peninsula in southwestern Guangdong, China

Lelemi – Lɛlɛmi

- Spoken in: Ghana

Lembena – ?

- Spoken in: East Sepik Province, Papua New Guinea

Lenakel – Netvaar

- Spoken in: Tanna Island, Vanuatu

Lenca † – ?

- Formerly spoken in: El Salvador and Honduras

Lendu – Bbaledha

- Spoken in: the Democratic Republic of the Congo

Lenje – Chilenje

- Spoken in: central Zambia

Leonese – Llïonés

- Official language in: the Spanish autonomous community of Castile and León

Lepcha – ᰛᰩᰵ་ᰛᰧᰶᰵ

- Official language in: the Indian state of Sikkim

Lese – Efé

- Spoken in: northeastern Democratic Republic of the Congo

Levantine Arabic – شامي

- Spoken in: Syria, Jordan, Lebanon, Palestine, Israel, and Turkey

Levantine Arabic Sign Language – لغة الإشارة العربية الشرقية

- Signed in: Syria, Jordan, Lebanon, and Palestine

Lezgian – лезги чӏал

- Official language in: Dagestan, Russia

Lhao Vo – Laungwaw, Lhaovo

- Spoken in: Kachin State, Myanmar

Lhokpu – Lhobikha

- Spoken in: southwest Bhutan

Lhomi – ल्होमी

- Spoken in: Tibet, China, the Darjeeling district of West Bengal, India, and Koshi Province, Nepal

Liberian Kreyol – Kolokwa, Kreyol

- Spoken in: Liberia

Libyan Arabic – ليبي

- Spoken in: Libya and neighboring countries

Libyan Sign Language – لغة الإشارة الليبية

- Signed in: Libya

Ligurian – lìgure, zeneize

- Official language in: Liguria, Italy and Monaco

Lihir – Lihir

- Spoken in: Lihir Island, New Ireland Province, Papua New Guinea

Lillooet – St̓át̓imcets, Sƛ̓aƛ̓imxǝc, Ucwalmícwts, Lil̓wat7úlmec

- Spoken in: British Columbia, Canada

Limbu – ᤕᤰᤌᤢᤱ ᤐᤠᤴ

- Official language in: the Indian state of Sikkim

Limbum – Limbùm

- Spoken in: Cameroon

Limburgish – Lèmburgs

- Official language in: the Netherlands

Lingala – Lingála

- Official language in: the Democratic Republic of the Congo and the Republic of the Congo

Lingua Franca Nova – lingua franca nova

- International auxiliary language

Lingwa de Planeta – Lidepla

- International auxiliary language

Lipo – Lolopo, Lolongo

- Spoken in: China

Lish – Lishpa, Khispi

- Spoken in: West Kameng district, Arunachal Pradesh in India

Lisu – ꓡꓲ-ꓢꓴ or ꓡꓲꓢꓴ

- Official language in: the Chinese autonomous prefecture of Nujiang Lisu and the Chinese autonomous county of Weixi Lisu
- Also spoken in: Kachin State, Myanmar

Lithuanian – lietuvių kalba

- Official language in: Lithuania and the European Union
- Recognised Minority Language in: Poland

Lithuanian Sign Language – Lietuvių gestų kalba

- Signed in: Lithuania

Livonian – Līvõ Kēļ or Rāndakēļ

- Spoken in: Latvia

Livvi-Karelian – Livvi

- Recognised Minority Language in: Finland, Russia

Lobi – Lobiri

- Spoken in: Burkina Faso, Ivory Coast and Ghana

Logo – Lògòti

- Spoken in: the Democratic Republic of the Congo

Logooli– Lulogooli

- Spoken in: Vihiga County, Kenya

Lojban – la .lojban.

- A logical constructed language

Lolopo – Loxrlavu

- Spoken in: China

Loma – Lɔ̀ɔ̀màgòòi, Löömàgòòi, Löghömàgòòi

- Spoken in: Liberia and Guinea

Lomavren – Լոմավրեն

- Spoken by: the Lom in Armenia

Lombard – lombard, lumbard, lumbart, lombart

- Official language in: Lombardy, Italy
- Also spoken in: the Swiss cantons of Grisons and Ticino

Lomwe – Elomwe

- Spoken in: Malawi and Mozambique

Loncong – Sekak

- Spoken in: Bangka Belitung Islands, Indonesia

Louisiana Creole – Kouri-Vini, Kréyòl Lalwizyann

- Spoken in: Louisiana, United States

Low German – Plattdüütsch

- Spoken in: Denmark, Germany, and the Netherlands

Lower Chehalis † – Łəw̓ál̕məš

- Formerly spoken in: Washington, the United States

Lower Sorbian – Dolnoserbski

- Spoken in: Brandenburg, Germany

Lower Tanana – Menhti Kenaga

- Official language in: Alaska, the United States

Lozi – Rozi, Silozi

- Recognised Minority Language in: Zambia and Namibia

Luba-Kasai – Tshiluba

- Spoken in: the Democratic Republic of the Congo

Luba-Katanga – Kiluba

- Spoken in: the Democratic Republic of the Congo

Lucumí – Lucumí

- Recognised Minority Language in: Cuba (a liturgical language)

Ludic – Luudi, Lyydi or lüüdi

- Spoken in: Karelia, Russia

Luganda – Luganda, LùGáànda, Oluganda

- Spoken in: Uganda

Lugbara – Lʉgbara tɨ

- Spoken in: West Nile sub-region, Uganda and Orientale Province, the Democratic Republic of the Congo

Luhya – Oluluhya

- Spoken in: Kenya

Luiseño † – Cham'teela

- Formerly spoken in: the southern area of California, United States

Lule † – ?

- Formerly spoken in: Resistencia, Chaco, Argentina

Lunda – Chilunda

- Spoken in: Zambia, Angola and the Democratic Republic of the Congo

Lundayeh – Buri' Lun Bawang, Buri' Lun Dayeh

- Spoken in: Sarawak, Malaysia, Indonesia; and Brunei

Luo – Kavirondo or Dholuo

- Spoken in: Kenya and Tanzania

Luobohe Miao – A-Hmyo, Ā-hmiò

- Spoken in: central Guizhou, China

Luri – لری or Lori

- Spoken in: Iran, Iraq, Kuwait, Oman, and the United Arab Emirates

Lushootseed – dxʷləšucid, txʷəlšucid, xʷəlšucid

- Spoken in: northwestern Washington, the United States

Luvale – Chiluvale

- Spoken in: Angola and Zambia

Luxembourgish – Lëtzebuergesch

- Official language in: Luxembourg
- Recognised Minority Language in: the Belgian community of the French Community of Belgium

Lyélé – Lyélé

- Spoken in: Burkina Faso

=== M ===
Maale – Maale, Male

- Spoken in: South Omo Zone, South Ethiopia Regional State Ethiopia

Maasai – ɔl Maa

- Spoken by: the Kenyan/Tanzanian Maasai people

Maay – Af-maay

- Spoken in: Somalia

Macanese – Patuá

- Spoken in: Macau, China

Macau Sign Language – 澳門手語

- Signed in: Macau, China

Macedonian – Mакедонски, Makedonski

- Official language in: North Macedonia
- Recognised Minority Language in: Albania, Romania, and Serbia

Macedonian Sign Language – македонски знаковен јазик, makedonski znakoven jazik

- Signed in: North Macedonia

Machame – Kimashami

- Spoken in: North Tanzania

Macushi – Makusi

- Spoken in: Roraima, Brazil, Venezuela

Maʼdi – Maʼdi ti

- Spoken in: Uganda and South Sudan

Madí – Jamamadí

- Spoken in: Amazonas, Brazil

Madurese – Basa Mathura

- Official language in: East Java in Indonesia

Magahi – मगही

- Spoken in: India and Nepal

Magar – मगर भाषा

- Official language in: the Indian state of Sikkim

Magar Kham – मगर ढुट

- Spoken in: Nepal

Maguindanao – Maguindanao

- Spoken in: Maguindanao del Norte and Maguindanao del Sur, Philippines

Maharashtri Prakrit † – 𑀫𑀳𑀸𑀭𑀸𑀱𑁆𑀝𑁆𑀭𑀻, 𑘦𑘮𑘰𑘨𑘰𑘬𑘿𑘘𑘿𑘨𑘲

- Formerly spoken in: Maharashtra, India

Maithili – मैथिली, মৈথিলী

- Official language in: the Indian state of Bihar and Nepal

Majhi – माझी

- Spoken in: Nepal

Makasae – Makasai

- Spoken in: Timor-Leste

Makassar Malay – ?

- Spoken in: Makassar, South Sulawesi, Indonesia

Makassarese – Basa Mangkasara', ᨅᨔ ᨆᨀᨔᨑ

- Spoken in: the southern tip of the Indonesian province of South Sulawesi

Makhuwa – Emakuana

- Spoken in: northern Mozambique and southern Tanzania

Makhuwa-Meetto – Imeetto

- Spoken in: Mozambique and Tanzania

Makonde – Chimakonde

- Spoken in: Mozambique and Tanzania

Malaccan Creole Portuguese – Kristang

- Spoken in: Malacca, Malaysia

Malagasy – Malagasy

- Official language in: Madagascar

Malagasy Sign Language – Tenin'ny Tanana Malagasy

- Signed in: Madagascar

Malawian Sign Language – Malawian Sign Language

- Signed in: Malawi

Malay – Bahasa Melayu or بهاس ملايو

- Official language in: Brunei, Malaysia, and Singapore

Malayalam – മലയാളം

- Official language in: the Indian state of Kerala and the Indian territories of Lakshadweep and Puducherry

Malaysian Sign Language – Bahasa Isyarat Malaysia

- Signed in: Malaysia

Maldivian Sign Language – ދިވެހި އިޝާރާތް ބަސް

- Signed in: Maldives

Maliseet-Passamaquoddy – skicinuwatuwewakon

- Spoken in: Canada and the United States

Malinaltepec Me’phaa – Mè'phàà Mañuwìín

- Spoken in: Oaxaca, Mexico

Maltese – Malti

- Official language in: Malta and the European Union

Maltese Sign Language – Lingwa tas-Sinjali Maltija

- Signed in: Malta

Mam – Qyool Mam, Ta yol Mam

- Recognised Minority Language in: Mexico and Guatemala

Mamara Sénoufo – Bàmáágà, Mamaara, Miyɛngaa

- Official language in: Mali

Manado Malay – Bahasa Manado

- Spoken in: Manado, North Sulawesi, Indonesia

Manchu – ᠮᠠᠨᠵᡠ ᡤᡳᠰᡠᠨ

- Spoken by: the Manchu people

Mandan † – Nų́ų́ʔetaa íroo

- Formerly spoken in: the Fort Berthold Indian Reservation, North Dakota, the United States

Mandar – Mandar

- Spoken in: the island of Sulawesi, Indonesia

Mandarin – 國語

- Spoken in: Most of China

Mandeali – मंडियाली

- Spoken in: Himachal Pradesh, India

Mandinka – Mandinka kaŋo

- Spoken in: Senegal, The Gambia and Guinea-Bissau

Mandjak – Manjáku

- Spoken in: The Gambia, Guinea-Bissau and Senegal

Mangareva – te reo magareva

- Spoken in: Gambier Islands in French Polynesia, France

Manggarai – ?

- Spoken in: Flores, East Nusa Tenggara, Indonesia

Mango – Mangɔ

- Spoken in: Chad

Mangue † – Mánekeme

- Formerly spoken in: El Salvador, Honduras, Nicaragua, and Costa Rica

Maninka – Maninkakan, ߡߊ߬ߣߌ߲߬ߞߊ߬ߞߊ߲

- Official language in: Guinea and Mali

Mansi – ма̄ньси/ма̄ньщи

- Spoken: along the Ob River and its tributaries, in the Khanty–Mansi Autonomous Okrug, and Sverdlovsk Oblast in Russia

Manx – Gaelg, Gailck

- Official language in: the Isle of Man, the United Kingdom

Māori – te Reo Māori

- Official language in: New Zealand

Mapuche – Mapudungun

- Official language in: the communes of Galvarino, Padre Las Casas and Temuco in Chile

Mapun – Pallun Mapun

- Spoken in: Sabah, Malaysia; and Sulu, the Philippines

Mara – Mara reih

- Spoken in: southern Mizoram, India, Myanmar

Maranao – Basa a Mëranaw, باسا أ مراناو

- Regional language in: the Philippines

Marathi – मराठी

- Official language in: the Indian state of Maharashtra and the Indian territories of Daman and Diu and Dadra and Nagar Haveli

Mardijker Creole † – Papiá Tugu

- Formerly spoken in: Batavia (modern-day Jakarta), Indonesia

Margi – Marghi

- Spoken in: the states of Adamawa, Borno, Gombe, and Yobe, Nigeria

Mari – марий йылме

- Official language in: Mari El, Russia

Maria – Madiya Gondi, माडिया गोंड

- Spoken in: Maharashtra, India

Maritime Sign Language – Maritime Sign Language, Langue des signes maritime

- Signed in: New Brunswick, Newfoundland and Labrador, Nova Scotia, and Prince Edward Island, Canada

Marquesan (North) – Èo ènana

- Spoken in: Marquesas Islands in French Polynesia, France

Marquesan (South) – Èo ènata

- Spoken in: Marquesas Islands in French Polynesia, France

Marrithiyel – Berringen

- Spoken in: Northern Territory, Australia

Marshallese – Ebon, Kajin M̧ajeļ, Kajin Majõl

- Official language in: Marshall Islands

Marwari – मारवाड़ी, مارواڑی

- Spoken in: Rajasthan, India and also Pakistan

Masalit – kana masara

- Spoken in: Dar Masalit, Darfur, Sudan and also Chad

Mator † – Motor

- Formerly spoken in: the northern Sayan Mountains, Russia

Mauritian Creole – kreol morisien, morisien

- Official language in: Mauritius

Mayo – Caíta

- Official language in: Mexico

Mazahua – Jñatjo, Jñatrjo

- Spoken in: State of Mexico, Mexico

Mazanderani – مازِرونی

- Spoken in: Mazandaran Province, Iran

Mbelime – Mbɛlímɛ̀

- Spoken in: Togo
- Recognised Minority Language in: Benin

Mbuk – Mboko

- Spoken in: Cameroon

Mbukushu – Thimbukushu

- Spoken in: Namibia, Angola, Botswana, and Zambia

Mbunda – Chimbúùnda

- Spoken in: Angola and Zambia

Mbuun – Mpuun

- Spoken in: the Democratic Republic of the Congo

Me’en – Mɛʼɛnɛn

- Spoken in: the South West Ethiopia Peoples' Region, Ethiopia

Meadow Mari – олык марий

- Official language in: Mari El, Russia

Medumba – Mə̀dʉ̂mbɑ̀

- Spoken in: Cameroon

Megleno-Romanian – vlăhește

- Spoken in: Greece, North Macedonia, Romania, Turkey and Serbia

Mehri – مهريّت

- Spoken in: Yemen and Oman

Meitei – ꯃꯩꯇꯩꯂꯣꯟ, মনিপুরি, মৈতৈলোল্, মৈতৈলোন্, মৈথৈ

- Official language in: the Indian state of Manipur

Melpa – Melpa

- Spoken in: Western Highlands Province, Papua New Guinea

Mende – Mɛnde yia, 𞠗𞢱 𞡓𞠣

- Spoken in: Sierra Leone, Liberia and Guinea

Menominee – omǣqnomenēweqnæsewen

- Spoken in: Northeastern Wisconsin, the United States

Meriam Mir – Meriam Mir

- Spoken in: Eastern Torres Strait Islands, Queensland, Australia

Merico – Merico, Americo-Liberian

- Spoken in: Liberia

Meru – Kimîîru

- Spoken in: Meru County, Kenya

Meta’ – Mɨta’

- Spoken in: Cameroon

Mexican Sign Language – Lengua de Señas Mexicana

- Signed in: Mexico

Miami-Illinois – Myaamia

- Spoken in: the Illinois Confederation (Illinois, Indiana, Kansas, Michigan, Ohio, and Oklahoma, United States)

Michif – Michif

- Spoken by: the Métis people of Canada

Michoacán Nahuatl – Pómaro Nahuatl

- Spoken in: Mexico

Middle Armenian † – Հայերէն

- Formerly spoken in: the Armenian highlands and Cilicia

Middle Chinese † – 漢語, hɑn^{H} ŋɨʌ^{X}

- Formerly spoken in: China

Middle Dutch † – dietsc, duutsch

- Formerly spoken in: the Low Countries

Middle English † – Englisch, English, Inglis

- Formerly spoken in: the British Isles

Middle French † – françois, franceis

- Formerly spoken in: France

Middle High German † – diutsch, tiutsch

- Formerly spoken in: Germany, Austria and parts of Switzerland

Middle Irish † – Gaoidhealg

- Formerly spoken in: Ireland, Scotland and the Isle of Man

Middle Korean † – 中世韓國語

- Formerly spoken in: Korea

Middle Low German † – Sassisch, Dǖdisch, Nedderlendisch, Ôstersch, sassesche sprâke/sassche sprake, nedderlendische sprâke/nederlendesche sprake

- Formerly spoken in: Northern Central Europe

Middle Norwegian † – nornskt mál

- Formerly spoken in: Norway

Miju – Miju, Kùmán

- Spoken in: Arunachal Pradesh, India

Mi'kmaq – Miꞌkmawiꞌsimk

- Official language in: Nova Scotia, Canada
- Recognised Minority Language in: New Brunswick, Prince Edward Island, all in Canada, in the United States

Min – 閩語 or 闽语

- Spoken in: the southeastern area of China

Min Bei – 闽北语

- Spoken in: the Chinese prefecture-level city of Nanping

Min Dong – 閩東語

- Spoken in: the Chinese prefecture-level cities of Fuzhou and Ningde

Min Nan – 閩南語 or 闽南语

- Spoken in: the southeastern area of China

Min Zhong – 闽中话

- Spoken in: the southeastern area of China

Minangkabau – Baso Minangkabau, بهاس منڠكربو

- Spoken in: West Sumatra, Indonesia

Mingrelian – მარგალური ნინა

- Spoken in: Mingrelia, Georgia

Mirandese – mirandés, lhéngua mirandesa, léngua mirandesa

- Spoken in: Terra de Miranda, Portugal

Miraya Bikol – Miraya

- Spoken in: Daraga, Albay, the Philippines

Misak – Namdrik

- Spoken in: Colombia

Miskito – Miskitu

- Official language in: North Caribbean Coast Autonomous Region and South Caribbean Coast Autonomous Region in Nicaragua

Mixtec – sa'an davi, da'an davi, tu'un savi, dzaha dzavui, dzaha Ñudzahui

- Spoken in: Oaxaca, Puebla, and Guerrero, Mexico

Miyako – 宮古口, ミャークフツ, 島口, スマフツ

- Spoken in: Okinawa Prefecture, Japan

Mizo – Mizo ṭawng or Duhlián ṭawng

- Official language in: Mizoram, India

Mòcheno – Bersntolerisch, Bersntoler sproch

- Spoken in: Bersntol in Trentino, Italy

Mochoʼ – Qatoʼk, Mochoʼ

- Spoken in: Chiapas, Mexico

Mocoví – Moqoit

- Spoken in: Santa Fe Province, Argentina

Modern Greek – Νέα Ελληνικά

- Official language in: Greece, Cyprus, and European Union
- Recognised Minority Language in: Albania, Armenia, Hungary, Italy, Romania, South Africa, Turkey, and Ukraine

Modern Hebrew – עברית חדשה

- Official language in: Israel

Moghol † – مُغُلی

- Formerly spoken in: Afghanistan

Mohawk – Kanienʼkéha

- Spoken in: the United States and Canada

Mohegan-Pequot † – Mohiks-Piqut Uyôtowáwôk

- Formerly spoken in: Southern New England and Eastern Long Island, the United States

Mojave – Hamakhav

- Spoken in: Arizona, United States

Mokati – Wanambre

- Spoken in: Madang Province, Papua New Guinea

Mokilese – Mokil, Mwoakilloa

- Spoken in: Mokil Atoll, Federated States of Micronesia

Moksha – мокшень кяль

- Official language in: Mordovia, Russia

Mol – Alatil

- Spoken in: Sandaun Province, Papua New Guinea

Moldovan – молдовеняскэ, moldovenească

- Official language in: Transnistria
- Recognised Minority Language in: Ukraine
- Note: the Moldovan language is actually identical to the Romanian language, being one of the two local names for the Romanian language in Moldova (See Moldovenism for further details)

Mon – ဘာသာ မန်

- Spoken in: the Myanma delta of the Irrawaddy River

Mongo – Lomongo

- Spoken in: the Democratic Republic of the Congo

Mongolian – Монгол хэл, ᠮᠣᠩᠭᠣᠯ ᠬᠡᠯᠡ

- Official language in: Mongolia and Inner Mongolia, China

Mongolian Sign Language – Монгол дохионы хэл

- Signed in: Mongolia

Mongondow – Mongondow

- Spoken in: North Sulawesi, Indonesia

Monguor – moŋɡuer

- Spoken in: Chinese provinces of Qinghai and Gansu

Montagnais – Innu-aimun

- Spoken in: Quebec province and Labrador region, Canada

Montenegrin – crnogorski, црногорски

- Official language in: Montenegro
- Recognised Minority Language in: Albania, Bosnia and Herzegovina, and the Serbian municipality of Mali Iđoš in the autonomous region of Vojvodina

Mopán Maya – Maya Mopan, Mopan

- Spoken in: Belize and Guatemala

Mor – Mor

- Spoken in: West Papua, Indonesia

Moriori † – Ta Rē Moriori

- Formerly spoken in: Chatham Islands, New Zealand

Moroccan Arabic – العربية المغربية الدارجة

- Spoken in: Morocco

Moroccan Sign Language – لغة الإشارة المغربية

- Signed in: Morocco

Mossi – Mòoré

- Official language in: Burkina Faso

Motu – Motu

- Spoken in: Central Province, Papua New Guinea

Mozabite – تونژابت, Tumẓabt, ⵜⵓⵎⵥⴰⴱⵜ

- Spoken in: Algeria

Mozarabic † – مُزَرَب

- Formerly spoken in: Al-Andalus (modern-day Spain and Portugal)

Mru – 𖩃𖩓𖩑

- Spoken in: Bangladesh and Myanmar

Muna – Wuna

- Spoken in: Southeast Sulawesi, Indonesia

Munda – মুন্ডা

- Spoken in: Jharkhand, India

Mundabli-Mufu – Ji

- Spoken in: Cameroon

Mundang – záá múndàŋ

- Spoken in: Chad and Cameroon

Mundani – Ndɨ̧ Mundàni

- Spoken in: Cameroon

Mundari – मुंडारी, মুন্ডারি, ମୁଣ୍ଡାରୀ, 𞓧𞓟𞓨𞓜𞓕𞓣𞓚

- Official language in: Jharkhand, India

Munsee – Huluníixsuwaakan, Monsii èlixsuwakàn

- Spoken in: Ontario, Canada, formerly New Jersey, New York, and Pennsylvania, United States

Mường – thiểng Mường

- Spoken in: Northwestern Vietnam

Mursi – ሙነን

- Spoken in: Ethiopia

Muscogee Creek – Mvskoke, Mvskokē

- Spoken in: the American states of Alabama, Florida, Georgia, and Oklahoma

Musgu – Mulwi

- Spoken in: Cameroon and Chad

Musi – Basé Musi

- Spoken in: South Sumatra, Indonesia

Muskum † – Muzuk

- Formerly spoken in: Chad

Mussau-Emira – Mussau-Emira

- Spoken in: Mussau Island of St Matthias Islands, Papua New Guinea

=== N ===
N'Ko – ߒߞߏ

- Spoken in: West Africa

Nadëb – Nadëb

- Spoken in: Amazonas, Brazil

Nafusi – ?

- Spoken in: Northwestern Libya

Nagamese – Nagamiz

- Spoken in: Nagaland, India

Nagumi † – Gong or Ngong

- Formerly spoken in: Cameroon

Nahuatl – Māsēwallahtōlli, Mexicano, or Nāhuatlahtōlli

- Official language in: Mexico

Naiki – కొలామి

- Spoken in: Maharashtra, India

Najdi Arabic – نجدي ,اللهجة النجدية

- Spoken in: Saudi Arabia, Iraq, Jordan, and Syria

Nambya – Nanzva

- Official language in: Zimbabwe

Namibian Sign Language – Namibian Sign Language

- Signed in: Namibia and Angola

Nanai – на̄най, на̄ни

- Spoken in: Russia and China

Nara – Nara

- Recognised Minority Language in: Eritrea

Naro – Naro

- Spoken in: Namibia and Botswana

Narragansett † – ?

- Formerly spoken in: Rhode Island, the United States

Naskapi – ᓇᔅᑲᐱ, ᐃᔪᐤ ᐃᔨᒧᐅᓐ

- Spoken in: Quebec province and Labrador region, Canada

Natchez † – Na·šceh

- Formerly spoken in: Louisiana, Mississippi, and Oklahoma, United States

Nateni – Naàteǹni

- Recognised Minority Language in: Benin

Natügu – Natqgu

- Spoken in: Temotu, the Solomon Islands

Naukan Yupik – Нывуӄаӷмистун

- Spoken in: Chukotka Autonomous Okrug, Russia

Nauruan – Dorerin Naoero, Ekaiairũ Naoero

- Official language in: Nauru

Navajo – Diné bizaad

- Spoken in: the Navajo Nation, New Mexico, in the United States

Na'vi – Lìʼfya leNaʼvi

- Constructed language spoken by the Na'vi in the Avatar film franchise

Nawdm – Nawdm

- Spoken in: Togo

Naxi – Naqxi geezheeq

- Official language in: Yulong Naxi Autonomous County in Yunnan province, China

Ndau – chiNdau

- Official language in: Zimbabwe
- Spoken in: Mozambique

Ndogo – Có Ndógó

- Spoken in: South Sudan

Ndrumbea – Naa Dubea

- Spoken in: the southern tip outside Nouméa in New Caledonia, France

Ndyuka –

- Spoken in: French Guiana, France and Suriname

Neapolitan – napulitano

- Spoken in: Campania, Italy

Negerhollands † – Negerhollands

- Formerly spoken in: US Virgin Islands

Negeri Sembilan Malay – Baso Negeri Sembilan

- Spoken in: Negeri Sembilan, Malaysia

Negidal – Неғида хэсэнин

- Spoken in: Khabarovsk Krai, Russia

Nenets – ненэця’ вада, нешаӈ вата

- Spoken in: Nenets Autonomous Okrug, Russia

Nengone – ?

- Official language in: Maré, New Caledonia, France

Neo-Mandaic – Mandɔyí

- Spoken in: Iran

Nepal Bhasa – नेपाल भाषा

- Official language in: the Indian state of Sikkim and Nepal

Nepali – नेपाली

- Official language in: Nepal, Sikkim, West Bengal and the Gorkhaland Territorial Administration, India
- Recognised Minority Language in: Bhutan and Myanmar

Nepali Sign Language – नेपाली साङ्केतिक भाषा

- Signed in: Nepal

Nete – Nete, Bisorio, Malamauda, Iniai

- Spoken in: East Sepik Province, Papua New Guinea

New Zealand Sign Language – New Zealand Sign Language, te reo Rotarota o Aotearoa, te reo Turi o Aotearoa

- Official language in: New Zealand

Nez Perce – niimiipuutímt

- Spoken in: Idaho, United States

Ngaanyatjarra – Ngaanyatjarra

- Spoken in: Warburton, Western Australia in Australia

Ngäbere – Ngäbere

- Spoken in: Costa Rica and Panama

Ngaju – Ngaju

- Spoken in: Central Kalimantan, Indonesia

Ngambay – Ngambay

- Spoken in: Cameroon and Chad

Nganasan – ня” сиәде

- Spoken in: Taymyr Autonomous Okrug, Krasnoyarsk Krai, Russia

Ngangam – Miganganm

- Spoken in: Togo

Ngarinyin – Ungarinjin

- Spoken in: Kimberley, Western Australia, Australia

Ngbaka – Ngbaka

- Spoken in: the Democratic Republic of the Congo

Ngbee † – Lingbee

- Formerly spoken in: the Democratic Republic of the Congo

Ngiemboon – Shwóŋò ngiembɔɔn

- Spoken in: Cameroon

Ngizim – Ngizmawa, Ngezzim, Ngódṣin

- Spoken in: Yobe State, Nigeria

Ngoni (Mozambique) – Xingoni

- Spoken in: Mozambique

Ngoni (Tanzania) – Chingoni

- Spoken in: Songea, Tanzania

Nguồn – Năm Nguyên, Thiếng Nguồn

- Spoken in: Quảng Bình, Vietnam

Ngyian – Nghan

- Spoken in: Kaduna State, Nigeria

Nhanda – Nanda, Nhanta, Nhandi

- Spoken in: the Mid West region of Western Australia in Australia

Nheengatu – nhẽẽgatú, yẽgatu, nheẽgatu

- Official language in: the Brazilian municipalities of São Gabriel da Cachoeira in Amazonas and Monsenhor Tabosa in Ceará

Nias – Li Niha

- Spoken in: Nias and Batu Islands in North Sumatra, Indonesia

Nicaragua Creole English – Creole

- Spoken in: North Caribbean Coast Autonomous Region, Nicaragua

Nicaraguan Sign Language – Idioma de Señas de Nicaragua

- Signed in: Nicaragua

Nigerian Pidgin – Naijá

- Spoken in: Nigeria

Nigerian Sign Language – Nigerian Sign Language

- Signed in: Nigeria and Chad

Nihali – निहाली

- Spoken in: Madhya Pradesh and Maharashtra in India

Nisga'a – Nisg̱a’a, nisqáʔamq

- Spoken in: Northwest British Columbia, Canada

Niuafo’ou – Niuafo'ou

- Spoken in: Niuafo'ou, Tonga

Niuean – ko e vagahau Niuē

- Official language in: Niue, New Zealand

Nivaclé – Guisnai

- Spoken in: Boquerón, Paraguay

Nivkh – нивх диф, нивх туғс

- Spoken in: Khabarovsk Krai, Russia

Noakhali – নোয়াখাইল্লা

- Spoken in: Noakhali District in Chittagong Division, Bangladesh and the southern area of Tripura, India

Nobiin – Nòbíín, Ⲛⲟⲩⲃⲓⲛ, نُـٰوبين

- Spoken in: Egypt and Sudan

Nogai – ногай тили, nogay tili

- Official language in: Dagestan and Karachay-Cherkessia in Russia

Nomaande – Nɔmaándɛ́

- Spoken in: Littoral Region, Cameroon

Nomatsigenga – Nomatsigenga

- Spoken in: Junín, Peru

Nomlaki – Nomlāqa Bōda

- Spoken in: northern California, the United States

Nooksack – Lhéchelesem

- Spoken in: Whatcom County, Washington, United States

Noon – Kinoon

- Spoken in: Senegal

Noongar – Nyungar

- Spoken in: Western Australia, Australia

Norfuk – Norfuk, Norf'k

- Official language in: Norfolk Island, Australia

Norman – Normaund

- Spoken in: Normandy, France and the Channel Islands, the United Kingdom

Norn † – norn

- Formerly spoken in: Orkney, Shetland and Caithness in Scotland

North Efate – Nakanamanga

- Spoken in: Vanuatu

North Korean Sign Language – 조선수화

- Signed in: North Korea

North Mesopotamian Arabic – لهجة موصلية

- Spoken in: Iraq, Syria, and Turkey

North Moluccan Malay – Bahasa Pasar

- Spoken in: North Maluku, Indonesia

North Straits Salish – xʷsenəčqən

- Spoken in: British Columbia, Canada, the United States

Northern Emberá – Dadyi Ẽ́berã Bed̶ea, Ẽ́berã Bed̶ea

- Spoken in: Darién Gap in Panama and in Colombia

Northern Khmer – เขมรถิ่นไทย

- Recognised Minority Language in: Thailand

Northern Ndebele – isiNdebele

- Official language in: Zimbabwe

Northern Ngbandi – Ngbandi

- Spoken in: the Democratic Republic of the Congo

Northern Paiute – Numu, nɨɨmɨ

- Spoken in: Nevada, California, Oregon, and Idaho, the United States

Northern Qiang – Rrmearr

- Spoken in: Sichuan, China

Northern Sotho – Sesotho sa Leboa, Pedi, Sepedi

- Official language in: South Africa

Northern Thai – ᨣᩴᩤᨾᩮᩥᩬᨦ

- Spoken in: the northern area of Thailand, and some other parts of Southeast Asia

Northern Tutchone – Dän kʼí

- Spoken in: Yukon, Canada

Northern Yukaghir – Вадул аруу

- Spoken in: Sakha Republic, Russia

Northwestern Mari – Йөтнӫмӓл-кӓсвел маре йӹлмӹ

- Spoken in: Kirov Oblast (Yaransky, Tuzhinsky, Kiknursky, Sanchursky districts), Nizhny Novgorod Oblast (Tonshayevsky, Sharangsky, Tonkinsky districts), and Mari El (north of Kilemarsky and Medvedevsky districts) in Russia

Northwestern Otomi – Ñäñho

- Spoken in: the Mexican states of Hidalgo, Querétaro and México

Norwegian – Norsk

- Official language in: Norway

Norwegian Sign Language – norsk tegnspråk, norsk teiknspråk

- Signed in: Norway

Nottoway – Cheroenhaka

- Spoken in: Virginia in the United States

Novial – novial

- International auxiliary language

Nubi – Kinubi, كي-نوبي

- Spoken in: Uganda and Kenya

Nuer – Thok Naath

- Spoken in: South Sudan, Ethiopia

Numanggang – Numaŋgaŋ

- Spoken in: Morobe Province, Papua New Guinea

Nume – Tarasag, Gog

- Spoken in: Gaua, Vanuatu

Numèè – Naa Numee

- Spoken in: southern New Caledonia, France

Nung – Nùng, Nohng

- Spoken in: Vietnam, China and Laos

Nuosu (Yi) – ꆈꌠ꒿

- Spoken in: China

Nupe – Nupe

- Spoken in: Nigeria

Nuu-chah-nulth – nuučaan̓uɫ

- Spoken in: British Columbia, Canada

Nuxalk – ItNuxalkmc

- Spoken in: British Columbia, Canada

Nyakusa – Kɨnyakyʉsa

- Spoken in: Malawi and Tanzania

Nyamwezi – Nyamwezi

- Spoken in: Tanzania

Nyangia – Nyang'i

- Spoken in: Uganda

Nyankore – Orunyankore

- Spoken in: Uganda

Nyoro – Orunyoro

- Spoken in: Uganda

Nzema – Nzema

- Spoken in: Ghana and Ivory Coast

Nǁng – Nǁŋǃke

- Spoken in: South Africa

=== O ===
Obolo – Andoni

- Spoken in: Rivers State and Akwa Ibom State, Nigeria

Occitan – occitan, lenga d'òc, provençal / provençau

- Official language in: the Spanish comarca of Val d'Aran
- Recognised Minority Language in: Auvergne-Rhône-Alpes, Centre-Val de Loire, Nouvelle-Aquitaine, Occitania, and Provence-Alpes-Côte d'Azur, Guardia Piemontese and Occitan Valleys in Italy, and Monaco

Ọchịchị † – Oʼchiʼchiʼ

- Formerly spoken in: Rivers State, Nigeria

Odia – ଓଡ଼ିଆ

- Official language in: the Indian states of Jharkhand and Odisha

Ogiek – Okiek, Akiek

- Spoken in: Southern Kenya and Northern Tanzania

Oirat – ᡆᡕᡅᠷᠠᡑ ᡘᡄᠯᡄᠨ

- Spoken in: Russia Mongolia and China

Oirata – Maaro

- Spoken in: Maluku, Indonesia

Ojibwe – ᐊᓂᔑᓈᐯᒧᐎᓐ

- Spoken by: the Ojibwe people

Oji-Cree – ᐊᓂᔑᓂᓂᒧᐏᐣ

- Spoken by: the Oji-Cree people

Okanagan – n̓səl̓xčin̓, n̓syil̓xčn̓

- Spoken in: British Columbia, Canada, the United States

Okinawan – 沖縄口, ウチナーグチ

- Spoken in: Okinawa Prefecture, Japan

Okinoerabu – 島ムニ

- Spoken in: Kagoshima Prefecture, Japan

Old Aramaic † – ?

- Formerly spoken in: the Fertile Crescent

Old Church Slavonic † – Словѣ́ньскъ Ѩзꙑ́къ, ⰔⰎⰀⰂⰑⰐⰊⰍ

- Formerly spoken in: Eastern Europe

Old Dutch † – thiudisc

- Formerly spoken in: the Low Countries

Old English † – Anglisc, Ænglisc, Englisc, or ᚫᛝᛚᛁᛋᚻ

- Formerly spoken in: England, Scotland and Wales

Old French † – Franceis, François, Romanz

- Formerly spoken in: France, Belgium

Old Frisian † – Frīsesk

- Formerly spoken in: the Netherlands, Germany and the Region of Southern Denmark

Old Georgian † – ႤႬႠჂ ႵႠႰႧႭჃႪႨ

- Formerly spoken in: Georgia

Old High German † – diutisk

- Formerly spoken in: Central Europe

Old Irish † – Goídelc, ᚌᚑᚔᚇᚓᚂᚉ

- Formerly spoken in: the British Isles

Old Japanese † – 上代日本語, 大和言葉

- Formerly spoken in: Japan

Old Korean † – Silla(n)

- Formerly spoken in: southern and central areas of Korea

Old Norse † – dǫnsk tunga, norrǿnt mál

- Formerly spoken in: Northern Europe

Old Occitan † – romans, proensals

- Formerly spoken in: Southern France

Old Persian † – 𐎠𐎼𐎹, Ariya

- Formerly spoken in: Iran

Old Prussian † – Prūsiskai

- Formerly spoken in: Prussia

Old Saxon † – Sahsisk

- Formerly spoken in: Northwest Germany, Northeast Netherlands and Southern Denmark

Old Spanish † – roman, romançe, romaz

- Formerly spoken in: the Crown of Castile, Spain

Old Sundanese † – ᮘᮞ ᮞᮥᮔ᮪ᮓ ᮘᮥᮠᮥᮔ᮪

- Formerly spoken in: Sunda Kingdom

Old Tamil † – 𑀧𑀵𑀦𑁰𑀢𑀫𑀺𑀵𑁰

- Formerly spoken in: Tamilakam

Old Tupi † – abáñe'enga

- Formerly spoken in: the Coastline of Brazil

Old Udi † – 𐕒𐕡𐔳𐔼𐕎 𐕌𐕒𐕡𐔵

- Formerly spoken in: Caucasian Albania

Omaha-Ponca – Umoⁿhoⁿ, Paⁿka

- Spoken in: Nebraska, Iowa, and Oklahoma, the United States

Omani Arabic – اللهجة العمانية

- Spoken in: Oman, United Arab Emirates

Omani Sign Language – لغة الإشارة العمانية

- Signed in: Oman

Omotik † – Laamoot

- Formerly spoken in: Great Rift Valley, Kenya

Oneida – Onʌyotaʔa꞉ka

- Spoken in: Canada and the United States

Onge – Öñge

- Spoken in: Andaman and Nicobar Islands

Ongota – Birale

- Spoken in: South Omo Zone, South Ethiopia Regional State, Ethiopia

Onin – ?

- Spoken in: West Papua, Indonesia

Onondaga – Onǫdaʼgegáʼ, Onoñdaʼgegáʼ nigaweñoʼdeñʼ

- Spoken in: Canada and the United States

Ontong Java – Luangiua

- Spoken in: Ontong Java Atoll, Solomon Islands

Oʼodham – ʼOʼodham ha-ñeʼokĭ, ʼOʼodham ñiʼokĭ, Oʼodham ñiok

- Official language in: Mexico
- Also spoken in: the United States

Orang Seletar – Orang Seletar, Seletar, Slitar

- Spoken in: Malaysia and Singapore

Ormuri – اورموړی

- Spoken in: South Waziristan District, Khyber Pakhtunkhwa, Pakistan

Oroch – Орочи кэсэни

- Spoken in: Khabarovsk Krai, Russia

Orok – ульта

- Spoken in: Sakhalin Oblast, Russia

Oromo – Afaan Oromoo

- Official language in: Ethiopia
- Recognised Minority Language in: Kenya

Oroqen – ?

- Spoken in: Heilongjiang, China

Ortatürk – Öztürk tili, Öztürkçe

- Zonal auxiliary language for Turkic peoples

Osage † – 𐓏𐒰𐓓𐒰𐓓𐒷 𐒻𐒷, Wažáže ie

- Formerly spoken in: Oklahoma, the United States

Osing – Basa Using, ꦧꦱꦲꦸꦱꦶꦁ

- Spoken in: Banyuwangi Regency and Jember Regency, East Java, Indonesia

Ossetian – ирон ӕвзаг, дигорон ӕвзаг

- Official language in: North Ossetia–Alania, Russia and South Ossetia

Otomi – Hñähñu, Hpyurta, Ñätho, Ñäñho, Ñ'yühü, Hñotho, Hñähü, Hñätho, Yųhų, Yųhmų, Ñųhų, Ñǫthǫ, Ñañhų

- Spoken in: the Mexican states of México, Puebla, Veracruz, Hidalgo, Guanajuato, Querétaro, Tlaxcala, and Michoacán

Ottoman Turkish † – لسان عثمانی

- Formerly an official language in: the Ottoman Empire

Ovambo – Oshiwambo

- Spoken in: Angola and Namibia

Oy – Oi, The

- Spoken in: Attapeu province, Laos

Ozomatlán Totonac – ?

- Spoken in: Puebla, Mexico

=== P ===
Páez – Nasa Yuwe

- Spoken in: Colombia

Pahari – पहाड़ी

- Spoken in: the Indian states of Himachal Pradesh, Jammu and Kashmir, Punjab, Sikkim, Uttarakhand, and West Bengal; Nepal, the Pakistani state of Azad Kashmir, and Greater Tibet

Pahlavi † – 𐭯𐭠𐭫𐭮𐭩𐭪 ,𐫛𐫀𐫡𐫘𐫏𐫐, 𐬞𐬀𐬭𐬯𐬍𐬐

- Formerly spoken in: Iran

Paicî – ?

- Official language in: New Caledonia

Paipai – Akwa'ala

- Spoken in: Baja California, Mexico

Paiwan – Vinuculjan, Pinayuanan

- Official language in: Taiwan

Pakpak – Kata Pakpak, Batak Dairi

- Spoken by: the Pakpak and Singkil people of North Sumatra, Indonesia

Palauan – a tekoi er a Belau

- Official language in: Palau

Palawa Kani – palawa kani

- Constructed language based on reconstructed vocabulary of Aboriginal Tasmanian languages of Tasmania, Australia

Palenquero – Palenquero

- Spoken in: San Basilio de Palenque, Bolívar Department, Colombia

Pali – 𑀧𑀸𑀮𑀺, 𐨤𐨫𐨁, បាលី, ပါဠိ, ᨷᩤᩊᩦ, บาลี, පාලි, पालि, Pāḷi

- The Pali language is a liturgical language of Theravada Buddhism

Palikúr – Pa'ikwené, Pa'ikwaki

- Spoken in: Amapá, Brazil, France

Palula – پالُولا

- Spoken in: the Pakistani district of Chitral

Pamona – Poso, Bare’e

- Spoken in: Central, Indonesia

Pana – Pa̧na

- Spoken in: Cameroon, the Central African Republic and Chad

Panamanian Sign Language – Lengua de señas panameñas

- Signed in: Panama

Panará – panãra pẽẽ

- Spoken in: Mato Grosso, Brazil

Panare – Eʼñapa Woromaipu

- Spoken in: Bolívar, Venezuela

Panawa – Bujiyel

- Spoken in: Toro, Bauchi State, Nigeria

Pandan Bikol – Pandanon

- Spoken in: Catanduanes, Philippines

Pangasinan – Pangasinan

- Spoken in: Pangasinan, Philippines

Pannonian Rusyn – Руски язик

- Official language in: The Serbian autonomous province of Vojvodina

Pa'O – ပအိုဝ်ႏ

- Recognised Minority Language in: Myanmar

Papel – Oyum

- Spoken in: Guinea-Bissau

Papiamento – Papiamento, Papiamentu

- Official language in: Aruba, Bonaire, and Curaçao, the Netherlands

Papua New Guinean Sign Language – Papua New Guinean Sign Language

- Official language in: Papua New Guinea

Papuan Malay – Melayu Papua

- Spoken in: Papua, West Papua, Central Papua, South Papua, Highland Papua, and Southwest Papua, Indonesia

Para – Jaijairai

- Spoken in: Myanmar and India

Paraguayan Sign Language – Lengua de señas paraguaya

- Signed in: Paraguay

Paratió † – Prakió

- Formerly spoken in: Brazil

Paresi – Haliti-Paresi, Paresi-Haliti

- Spoken in: Mato Grosso, Brazil

Parkari Koli – پارکری کولی

- Spoken in: Tharparkar, Pakistan

Parya – Парья

- Spoken in: Afghanistan, Tajikistan and Uzbekistan

Pashto – پښتو

- Official language in: Afghanistan
- Recognised Minority Language in: Pakistan

Pataxó-Hãhãhãe † – Hahaháy, Pataxó, Hãhãhãe

- Formerly spoken in: Minas Gerais, Brazil

Pattani Malay – بهاس جاوي, Bahasa Jawi, or ภาษายาวี

- Spoken in: Narathiwat, Pattani, Songkhla, and Yala, Thailand

Pawnee – pâri pakûru’

- Spoken in: Oklahoma, United States

Pazeh – Pazih, Pazéh, Kaxabu

- Spoken in: Taiwan

Pennsylvania German – Pennsilfaanisch Deitsch

- Spoken by: the Pennsylvania German people in the United States and Canada

Penrhyn – Mangarongaro, Tongareva

- Official language in: the Cook Islands, New Zealand

Pentlatch † – Pənƛ’áč

- Formerly spoken in: British Columbia, Canada

Persian – فارسی

- Official language in: Afghanistan, Iran, and Tajikistan

Peruvian Sign Language – Lengua de señas peruana

- Signed in: Peru

Petjo – Petjoh, Petjok, Pecok, Petjoek

- Spoken in: Indonesia and Netherlands

Phoenician † – 𐤃𐤁𐤓𐤉𐤌 𐤊𐤍𐤏𐤍𐤉𐤌

- Formerly spoken in: the Near East

Piapoco – Cháse

- Spoken in: Colombia and Venezuela

Picard – picard

- Recognised Minority Language in: Wallonia, Belgium

Pichinglis – Pichi

- Spoken in: Bioko, Equatorial Guinea

Pictish † – ?

- Formerly spoken in: Scotland

Piedmontese – piemontèis

- Recognised Minority Language in: Piedmont, Italy

Pijin – Pijin

- Spoken in: Solomon Islands

Piman – Tepiman

- Spoken in: Arizona, United States, Mexico

Pinghua – 平话

- Spoken in: China, Vietnam

Pintupi-Luritja – Pintupi-Luritja

- Spoken in: Western Australia, Australia

Pinyin – Àshwəŋnə̀ Pìnyinə

- Spoken in: Cameroon
- Note: This language's name is not to be confused with the name for romanization of the Chinese language

Pipil – Náhuat or Nawat

- Spoken in: the Salvadoran cities of San Salvador and Sonsonate; and the Salvadoran department of La Libertad

Pirahã – xapaitíiso

- Spoken in: the Brazilian state of Amazonas.

Pitjantjatjara – Pitjantjatjara

- Spoken in: the northwestern area of the Australian state of South Australia

Pitkern – Pitkern

- Official language in: the Pitcairn Islands, the United Kingdom

Plains Indian Sign Language – Hand Talk, Bee3osohoot, Bee3sohoet, A'psstówahsin, Évȯhónestȯtse, isiniskêstâkêwin, ᐃᓯᓂᐢᑫᐢᑖᑫᐃᐧᐣ, Ikstaaruhuraawaahʾuʾ, Gayeöni:h, Yideez, Baapáattuua, Wikiyutapi, Nąąp hoit’e, Wíyutȟapi, Wíyutabi, Wowîhâ Îabi, Mootekwaʔpʉ̠, Moʔotekwapʉ̠, Wanawmanik

- Signed in: Canada, United States, and northern Mexico

Plautdietsch – Plautdietsch

- Spoken in: Eastern Europe, with some scattered speakers in the Americas

Pochutec † – Naguál, nawal

- Formerly spoken in: Oaxaca, Mexico

Pohnpeian – Mahsen en Pohnpei, Lokaiahn Pohnpei

- Official language in: Pohnpei, Federated States of Micronesia

Pokomo – Kipfokomu

- Spoken in: Tana River District, Kenya

Pökoot – ngala Pökot

- Spoken in: West Pokot County, Kenya and Uganda

Polish – polski

- Official language in: Poland and the European Union
- Recognised Minority Language in: the Czech Republic, Romania, Slovakia, and Ukraine

Polish Sign Language – Polski Język Migowy

- Signed in: Poland

Pontic Greek – ποντιακά, ρωμαίικα

- Spoken in: Pontus, Turkey

Popoloca – Popoloca

- Spoken in: Puebla, Mexico

Poqomchi’ – Poqomchi'

- Spoken in: Guatemala

Portuguese – português

- Official language in: Angola, Brazil, Cape Verde, Timor-Leste, Equatorial Guinea, Guinea-Bissau, Macau (China), Mozambique, Portugal, São Tomé and Príncipe and the European Union

Portuguese Sign Language – Língua gestual portuguesa

- Signed in: Portugal

Potawatomi – bodwéwadmimwen

- Spoken in: the United States and Canada

Powhatan † – Kikitowämak

- Formerly spoken in: Virginia, the United States

Principense Creole – Lunguyê

- Spoken in: Príncipe, São Tomé and Príncipe

Puerto Rican Sign Language – Lengua de señas puertorriqueña

- Signed in: Puerto Rico

Pukapukan – Te Leo Wale

- Official language in: the Cook Islands, New Zealand

Puma – पुम

- Spoken in: Nepal

Pumé – Pumé

- Spoken in: Amazonas, Venezuela

Punic † – ?

- Formerly spoken in: Ancient Carthage, what is now Tunisia

Punjabi – पंजाबी, ਪੰਜਾਬੀ, or پنجابی

- Official language in: the Indian Union territory of Delhi; and the Indian states of Haryana, Himachal Pradesh, Punjab, and West Bengal
- Majority spoken language in: Pakistan and mostly in the province of Punjab

Puno Quechua – Qhichwa simi

- Spoken in: Puno, Peru

Punu – Yipunu

- Spoken in: Gabon and the Republic of the Congo

Purépecha – Pʼurhépecha

- Spoken in: Michoacán, Mexico

Purgi – པུ་རིག་་སྐད།, پُرگِی

- Spoken in: Baltistan, Pakistan and Ladakh, India

Puroik – pɯh˧˩ ɣut˥

- Spoken in: Arunachal Pradesh, India and Lhünzê County in Tibet, China

Pu-Xian Min – 興化話 or 莆仙話

- Spoken in: the Chinese county of Xianyou and the Chinese prefecture-level cities of Fuzhou, Putian, and Quanzhou

Puyuma – Pinuyumayan

- Spoken in: Taiwan

Pwo – ဖျိၩ့, ဖျိၩ့ၡိ, ဖၠုံ, ဖၠုံယှိုဝ်

- Spoken in: Kayin State, Myanmar and Thailand

=== Q ===
Qʼanjobʼal – Kanjobal

- Spoken in: Huehuetenango, Guatemala, Mexico

Qaqet – Baining

- Spoken in: East New Britain, Papua New Guinea

Qashqai – قشقايی ديلى

- Spoken in: Fars Province, Iran

Qatari Sign Language – لغة الأشارة القطرية

- Signed in: Qatar

Qʼeqchiʼ – Kekchi

- Official language in: Guatemala and Mexico

Quapaw † – Ogáxpa

- Formerly spoken in: Arkansas, United States

Quebec Sign Language – Langue des signes québécoise

- Signed in: Quebec, and parts of Ontario, Canada

Quechan – Kwatsáan Iiyáa

- Spoken in: California, the United States

Quechua – Runasimi

- Spoken by: the Quechua people in Argentina, Bolivia, Colombia, Ecuador, and Peru

Quenya – Eldarin

- Constructed language spoken by the Elves in the Middle-earth
- Quenya is used as a liturgical language by Elves

Quileute † – Kʷoʔlí·yot̓

- Formerly spoken in: the Olympic Peninsula, Washington, the United States

Quinault † – Kʷínaył

- Formerly spoken in: the Olympic Peninsula, Washington, the United States

Quinqui – Quinqui

- Spoken in: Spain

=== R ===
Rade – Klei Êđê

- Spoken in: southern Vietnam

Raga – Hano

- Spoken in: the Pentecost Island, Vanuatu

Rajasthani – राजस्थानी

- Spoken in: the Indian state of Rajasthan

Rajbanshi – राजबंशी, রাজবংশী, তাজপুরিয়া

- Spoken in: Nepal

Rama – Rama

- Official language in: North Caribbean Coast Autonomous Region and South Caribbean Coast Autonomous Region in Nicaragua

Ramanos † – ?

- Formerly spoken in: Bolivia

Rangi – Kɨlaangi

- Spoken in: Tanzania

Rangpuri – রংপুরী, কোচ-ৰাজবংশী, দেশী

- Official language in: West Bengal, India
- Also spoken in: Bangladesh

Rapa – Rapa, Mangaia

- Spoken in: Rapa Iti, French Polynesia, France

Rapa Nui – Vānaŋa Rapa Nui, Te reʻo Rapa Nui

- Official language in: Easter Island, Chile

Rara Bakati’ – Rara Bakati'

- Spoken in: Sarawak, Malaysia, Indonesia

Reel – Thuɔk ë Rëël

- Spoken in: South Sudan

Rejang – Miling Hejang, Miling Jang

- Spoken in: Bengkulu, Indonesia

Rendille – Afi Ren'dille

- Spoken in: Kenya

Rengao – Rơngao

- Recognised Minority Language in: Vietnam

Rennell-Bellona – Te hegeunga a Mugaba ma Mugiki

- Spoken in: Rennell and Bellona, Solomon Islands

Réunion Creole – kréol rénioné

- Official language in: Réunion, France

Riau Malay – ?

- Spoken in: Riau, Indonesia

Rinconada Bikol – Rinconada

- Spoken in: Camarines Sur, Philippines

Rodriguan Creole – Kreol rodrige

- Spoken in: Rodrigues, Mauritius

Rohingya – 𐴌𐴗𐴥𐴝𐴙𐴚𐴒𐴙𐴝

- Official language in: the Rakhine State, Myanmar
- Also spoken in: Southeastern Chittagong Division, Bangladesh

Romagnol – Rumagnòl

- Spoken in: Eastern Emilia-Romagna, Italy and San Marino

Romani – Romani Ćhib

- Spoken by: the Romani people

Romanian – română, limba română, românește

- Official language in: Romania, Moldova, Transnistria, Vojvodina (Serbia) and the European Union
- Recognised Minority Language in: Hungary, Serbia, and Ukraine

Romanian Sign Language – Limba semnelor române

- Signed in: Romania

Romansh – romontsch, rumantsch, rumauntsch, rumàntsch

- Official language in: Switzerland

Romblomanon – Rumblumãnun

- Spoken in: Some small islands in the central Philippines

Rotokas – Rotokas reo

- Spoken in: Bougainville part of Papua New Guinea

Rotuman – Fäeag Rotuạm

- Official language in: Rotuma, Fiji

Ruching Palaung – ဒါအာင်

- Spoken in: the Pa Laung Self-Administered Zone, Myanmar; and Yunnan, China

Rukai – drekai / drekay

- Spoken in: Pingtung, Kaohsiung, and Taitung counties, Taiwan

Rundi – Ikirundi

- Official language in: Burundi

Russian – русский

- Official language in: 8 countries, 3 subnational entities and 12 organizations
- Recognised Minority Language in: 7 countries

Russian Sign Language – русский жестовый язык

- Signed in: Russia, Tajikistan, Belarus, Kazakhstan, Kyrgyzstan, Uzbekistan and Moldova

Rusyn – Русиньский Язык, Русиньска Бесїда, Русинська Мова

- Official language in: The Serbian autonomous province of Vojvodina
- Recognised Minority Language in: Croatia, Poland, Romania, Serbia, and Slovakia

Ruthenian † – Руська мова

- Formerly spoken in: the Polish–Lithuanian Commonwealth and the Grand Duchy of Lithuania

Rutul – мыхаӀбишды чӀел

- Official language in: Dagestan, Russia

Ruuli – Luduuli

- Spoken in: Uganda

=== S ===
Saanich – SENĆOŦEN, Sənčáθən

- Spoken in: British Columbia, Canada, the United States

Saaroa – Lhaʼalua

- Spoken in: Taiwan

Saʼban – hmeu Saʼban

- Spoken in: Sarawak, Malaysia, Indonesia

Saba – Saɓɓoŋ

- Spoken in: Chad

Sadri – सादरी (नागपुरी), ସାଦ୍ରୀ, সাদরি

- Official language in: India

Saek – แถร̄ก

- Spoken in: Laos and Thailand

Saʽidi Arabic – صعيدى

- Spoken in: Minya Governorate, Egypt

Saint Lucian Creole – kwéyòl

- Spoken in: Saint Lucia

Saisiyat – SaiSiyat

- Spoken in: Taiwan

Saka † – ?

- Formerly spoken in: Central Asia

Sakachep – Khelma/Achep

- Spoken in: Northeast India

Sakizaya – Sakizaya

- Spoken in: Taiwan

Salar – Salarcha, 撒拉语

- Official language in: Xunhua Salar Autonomous County and Jishishan Bonan, Dongxiang and Salar Autonomous County, China

Salish – Séliš, Npoqínišcn

- Spoken in: Montana, Idaho, the United States

Salvadoran Sign Language – Lengua de señas salvadoreña

- Signed in: El Salvador

Samaritan Aramaic – ࠀࠓࠌࠉࠕ, Arāmît

- Formerly spoken in: Israel and Palestine
- The Samaritan Aramaic language is a liturgical language used by Samaritans

Samaritan Hebrew – ࠏࠁࠓࠉࠕ, Îbrit

- Formerly spoken in: Israel and Palestine
- The Samaritan Hebrew language is a liturgical language used by Samaritans

Sambal – Sambali

- Regional language in: the Philippines

Sambalpuri – ସମ୍ବଲପୁରୀ

- Spoken in: Western Odisha, India

Samburu – Sampur, ɔl Maa

- Spoken in: Samburu County, Kenya

Sámi (Akkala) † – äh'k'el'säm'la

- Formerly spoken in: Russia

Sámi (Inari) – anarâškielâ, aanaarsämikielâ

- Recognised Minority Language in: Finland

Sámi (Kemi) † – ?

- Formerly spoken in: Finland

Sámi (Kildin) – Кӣллт са̄мь кӣлл

- Recognised Minority Language in: Russia

Sámi (Lule) – julevsámegiella

- Official language in: Norway
- Recognised Minority Language in: Sweden

Sámi (Northern) – davvisámegiella

- Official language in: Norway
- Recognised Minority Language in: Finland and Sweden

Sámi (Pite) – bidumsámegiella

- Recognised Minority Language in: Norway and Sweden

Sámi (Skolt) – sääʹmǩiõll, nuõrttsääʹmǩiõll

- Recognised Minority Language in: Russia and Norway

Sámi (Southern) – åarjelsaemien gïele

- Official language in: Norway
- Recognised Minority Language in: Sweden

Sámi (Ter) – Са̄мькӣлл, saa´mekiill

- A moribund language spoken in: Russia

Sámi (Ume) – ubmejesámiengiälla

- Recognised Minority Language in: Sweden and Norway

Samoan – Gagana Sāmoa

- Official language in: Samoa and American Samoa, the United States

Samogitian – Žemaitiu kalba

- Spoken in: Samogitia, Lithuania

San Andrés–Providencia Creole – San Andres Ailanda Kriol

- Spoken in: San Andrés and Providencia, Colombia

Sanapaná – Nenlhet

- Spoken in: Presidente Hayes, Paraguay

Sandawe – Sàndàwé kì’ìng

- Spoken in: Tanzania

Sangir – Sangihẹ̆

- Spoken in: Sangir Island, North Sulawesi, Indonesia

Sango – yângâ tî sängö

- Official language in: the Central African Republic
- Recognised Minority Language in: Chad and the Democratic Republic of the Congo

Sangu – Shisangu

- Spoken in: Tanzania

Sanka – Dʉmʉna

- Spoken in: La Guajira Department, Colombia

Sanskrit – संस्कृतम्, संस्कृता वाक्

- Official language in: India

Santali – ᱥᱟᱱᱛᱟᱲᱤ

- Official language in: India

Sanumá – Sanöma

- Spoken in: Bolívar, Venezuela, Brazil

Sãotomense Creole – forro, santomense

- Spoken in: São Tomé, São Tomé and Príncipe

Sar – tà Sàᶉ̄

- Spoken in: Chad

Sara Kaba Démé – Sara Kaba Ɗem, Ɗem

- Spoken in: Chad

Sara Kaba Naa – Naa, Sara Kaba Naa

- Spoken in: Chad

Saramaccan – Saamáka

- Spoken in: Suriname and French Guiana, France

Sardinian – Sardu

- Official language in: the Italian autonomous region of Sardinia
- Recognised Minority Language in: Italy

Sarikoli – تۇجىك زىڤ ,سەرىقۇلى زىڤ

- Official language in: Tashkurgan Tajik Autonomous County, China

Sartang – But(pa)

- Spoken in: Arunachal Pradesh, India

Sasak – ᬪᬵᬲᬵᬲᬓ᭄ᬱᬓ᭄

- Spoken in: West Nusa Tenggara, Indonesia

Sassarese – sassaresu, turritanu

- Recognised Minority Language in: Sardinia, Italy

Satawalese – Satawal

- Spoken in: the Federated States of Micronesia

Saudi Sign Language – لغة الإشارة السعودية

- Signed in: Saudi Arabia

Sauk – Thâkiwâtowêweni

- Spoken by: the Sauk people

Saurashtra – ꢱꣃꢬꢵꢰ꣄ꢜ꣄ꢬꢵ

- Spoken in: the Indian states of Andhra Pradesh, Gujarat, Karnataka, Kerala, Maharashtra, and Tamil Nadu

Scandoromani – ?

- Spoken in: Norway and Sweden

Scots – Scots, Lallans, Doric

- Official language in: Scotland, the United Kingdom
- Recognised Minority Language in: Northern Ireland, the United Kingdom and County Donegal, Ireland

Scottish Gaelic – Gàidhlig

- Official language in: Scotland, the United Kingdom
- Recognised Minority Language in: Nova Scotia, Canada and the United Kingdom

Sechelt – sháshíshalh-em

- Spoken in: British Columbia, Canada

Secoya – Paikoka

- Spoken in: Ecuador and Peru

Sedang – rơtéang

- Spoken in: central Vietnam

Seediq – Kari Seediq, Taroko

- Spoken in: Taiwan

Sekani – Tse’khene

- Spoken in: British Columbia, Canada

Selkʼnam † – Selkʼnamčan

- Formerly spoken in: Argentina and Chile

Selkup – чу́мэл шэ, тюйкуй келл, шё̄шӄуй шэ̄, сӱ̄ссыӷӯй сэ̄, шöйӄумый эты

- Spoken in: Yamalo-Nenets Autonomous Okrug, Russia

Sena – Cisena

- Official language in: Zimbabwe
- Spoken in: Malawi and Mozambique

Senaya – ܣܢܝܐ ,ܣܘܪܝ

- Spoken in: Tehran and Qazvin, Iran

Seneca – Onöndowaʼga꞉ʼ Gawë꞉noʼ

- Spoken in: Western New York, the United States, Ontario, Canada

Sengele – ?

- Spoken in: the Democratic Republic of the Congo

Sentinelese – ?

- Spoken in: North Sentinel Island, in the Andaman Islands of India

Serbian – Српски, Srpski

- Official language in: Serbia, Bosnia and Herzegovina, and Kosovo
- Recognised Minority Language in: Croatia, Czech Republic, Hungary, Montenegro, North Macedonia, Romania and Slovakia

Serbian Sign Language – Српски знаковни језик, Srpski znakovni jezik

- Signed in: Serbia and Montenegro

Serbo-Croatian – srpskohrvatski/српскохрватски, also hrvatskosrpski/хрватскосрпски

- Official language in: Bosnia and Herzegovina, Croatia, Kosovo, Montenegro, Serbia, and the European Union
- Recognised Minority Language in: Austria, Czech Republic, Hungary, Italy, North Macedonia, Romania and Slovakia

Sercquiais – Sercquiais

- Spoken in: Sark, a part of Guernsey, the United Kingdom

Serer – Seereer, Seereer-Siin

- Spoken in: Gambia and the Senegal

Seri – cmiique iitom

- Spoken in: Sonora, Mexico

Serrano † – Maarrênga'twich

- Formerly spoken in: Southern California, the United States

Seychellois Creole – kreol, seselwa

- Official language in: Seychelles

Shabo – Mikeyir

- Spoken in: the eastern part of the South West Ethiopia Peoples' Region, Ethiopia

Shan – လိၵ်ႈတႆး

- Spoken in: the Myanmar states of the Kachin State and the Shan State and by the Shan people

Shanghainese – 上海闲话

- Spoken in: the Chinese municipality of Shanghai

Shao–Jiang Min – 邵將, 邵将

- Spoken in: Nanping in Fujian, China

Shatt – Ikä Caning

- Spoken in: Southern Sudan

Shauraseni Prakrit † – 𑀰𑁅𑀭𑀲𑁂𑀦𑀻

- Formerly spoken in: the Indian subcontinent

Shawiya – Tacawit

- Spoken in: the Aurès Mountains (in Batna, Khenchela, Oum El Bouaghi, Souk Ahras, Tébessa, and Biskra), also in Mila, Guelma, and Constantine, Algeria

Shawnee – saawanwaatoweewe, sâwanwâtowêwe

- Spoken in: Central and Northeast Oklahoma, the United States

Shehri – Śḥɛrɛ̄t, Gəblɛ̄t

- Spoken in: Oman

Shekkacho – Shekki-noone

- Spoken in: the South West Ethiopia Peoples' Region, Ethiopia

Sherdukpen – Mey, Ngnok

- Spoken in: West Kameng district, Arunachal Pradesh in India

Sherpa – शेर्पा, ཤེར་པཱ།

- Official language in: the Indian state of Sikkim

Shetland – Shaetlan

- Spoken in: Shetland, the United Kingdom

Shi – Mashi

- Spoken in: the Democratic Republic of the Congo

Shilha – Taclḥiyt, ⵜⴰⵛⵍⵃⵉⵢⵜ, تاشلحيت

- Spoken in: Morocco

Shilluk – Dhøg Cøllø

- Spoken in: South Sudan

Shina – ݜݨیاٗ زبان ,ݜݨیاٗ گلیتوࣿ زبان

- Spoken in: Gilgit-Baltistan, Pakistan

Shipibo-Conibo – Shipibo

- Spoken in: Ucayali Region, Peru

Shona – Shona

- Official language in: Zimbabwe

Shor – шор тили, тадар тили

- Spoken in: Kemerovo Oblast, Russia

Shoshoni – Sosoni' ta̲i̲kwappe, Neme ta̲i̲kwappeh

- Spoken in: Wyoming, Utah, Nevada, the United States

Shua – Shwakhwe

- Spoken in: Botswana

Shuar – Shiwar chicham

- Recognised Minority Language in: Ecuador

Shughni – xuɣ̌nůni ziv, خُږنۈنے زِڤ, хуг̌ну̊ни зив

- Spoken in: Gorno-Badakhshan in Tajikistan, Badakhshan Province in Afghanistan, Chitral District of Khyber Pakhtunkhwa in Pakistan and Tashkurgan Tajik Autonomous County in China.

Shuswap – Secwépemctsín

- Spoken in: British Columbia, Canada

Shwe Palaung – ဆာမ်လိုင်

- Spoken in: the Pa Laung Self-Administered Zone, Myanmar

Siar-Lak – ep warwar anun dat

- Spoken in: New Ireland Province, Papua New Guinea

Siberian Tatar – Себертатарца

- Spoken in: Western Siberia, Russia

Sicilian – Sicilianu

- Spoken in: the Italian region of Apulia, Calabria, Campania; the Italian comune of Leece; Malta; and the Italian autonomous region of Sicily

Sidamo – Sidaamu Afoo

- Spoken in: Sidama Region, Ethiopia

Sikkimese – འབྲས་ལྗོངས་

- Official language in: the Indian state of Sikkim

Silesian – Ślōnski, Ślůnski

- Spoken in: Poland and Czech Republic

Siltʼe – የስልጤ

- Spoken in: Central Ethiopia Regional State, Ethiopia

Sindarin – Sindarin

- Constructed language spoken by the Elves in the Middle-earth

Sindhi – سنڌي

- Official language in: India and the Pakistani province of Sindh

Sinhala – සිංහල

- Official language in: Sri Lanka

Sinicized Miao – Hmongb Shuat

- Spoken in: southern China

Sinte Romani – Romanes, Sinto, Sintitikes

- Recognised Minority Language in: the Netherlands and Germany

Siona – Gantëya coca

- Spoken in: Colombia and Ecuador

Sioux – Lakȟótiyapi, Dakȟótiyapi, Dakhód'iapi

- Official language in: South Dakota, the United States

Siraya † – Siraya

- Formerly spoken in: Taiwan

Sirenik † – Сиӷы́ных

- Formerly spoken in: Chukotka Autonomous Okrug, Russia

Sirmauri – सिरमौरी

- Spoken in: Sirmaur district, Himachal Pradesh, India

Siwi – Jlan n Isiwan

- Spoken in: Siwa Oasis, Qara Oasis, and Al Jaghbub Oasis in Egypt and Libya

Slavey – Sahtúgot’įné Yatı̨́, K’ashógot’įne Goxedǝ́, Shíhgot’įne Yatı̨́, Dené Dháh, Dene Yatıé, Dene Zhatıé

- Official language in: the Northwest Territories, Canada

Slovak – slovenčina, slovenský jazyk

- Official language in: Slovakia, Vojvodina (Serbia), and the European Union
- Recognised Minority Language in: Austria, Croatia, the Czech Republic, Hungary, Montenegro, Poland, Romania and Ukraine

Slovak Sign Language – Slovenský posunkový jazyk

- Signed in: Slovakia

Slovene – slovenščina, slovenski jezik

- Official language in: Slovenia and the European Union
- Recognised Minority Language in: Austria, Hungary, and Italy

Slovenian Sign Language – Slovenski znakovni jezik

- Signed in: Slovenia

Slovio – Slovio, Словио

- Zonal auxiliary language for Slavs

Soga – Lusoga

- Spoken in: Uganda

Sogdian † – 𐼑𐼇𐼄𐼌𐼊𐼋 [𐼀𐼈𐼂𐼀𐼋], 𐼼𐼴𐼶𐼹𐼷𐼸 (𐼰𐼵𐼱𐼰𐼸), 𐼼𐼲𐼴𐼹𐼷𐼰𐼴, 𐫘𐫇𐫄𐫔𐫏𐫀𐫇

- Formerly spoken in: Central Asia and China

Solresol – Sol-Re-Sol

- A musical constructed language

Somali – Af Soomaali, Soomaali, 𐒖𐒍 𐒈𐒝𐒑𐒛𐒐𐒘, 𐒈𐒝𐒑𐒛𐒐𐒘, اف صومالِ, صومالِ

- Official language in: Somalia, Somaliland, and Ethiopia
- National language in: Djibouti
- Recognised Minority Language in: Kenya

Songhay – Songhai

- Spoken in: West Africa, primarily in Niger and Mali

Soninke – Sooninkanxanne

- Spoken in: West Africa, primarily in Mali and Mauritania

Sonsorolese – Ramari Dongosaro

- Official language in: Sonsorol, Palau

Soq – Male

- Spoken in: Madang Province, Papua New Guinea

Soqotri – ماتڸ دسقطري

- Spoken in: Socotra Archipelago, Yemen

Sora – 𑃐𑃚𑃝, ସଉରା

- Spoken in: India

Sorani – سۆرانی, Soranî

- Spoken in: Iran and Iraq

Sotho – Sesotho

- Official language in: Lesotho, South Africa, and Zimbabwe

Sougb – Sougb

- Spoken in: West Papua, Indonesia

South African Sign Language – Suid-Afrikaanse Gebaretaal

- Official language in: South Africa

South Azerbaijani – آذربایجان دیلی

- Spoken in: Iranian Azerbaijan, Iran

South Barisan Malay – ?

- Spoken in: Bengkulu, South Sumatra, and Lampung, Indonesia

South Efate – Nafsan

- Spoken in: Vanuatu

Southeastern Puebla Nahuatl – nawatlajtole

- Spoken in: Tehuacán, Puebla, Mexico

Southern Ndebele – isiNdebele

- Official language in: South Africa

Southern Qiang – ?

- Spoken in: Sichuan, China

Southern Quechua – Urin Qhichwa

- Official language in: Bolivia, Peru, and Santiago del Estero Province, Argentina
- Recognised Minority Language in: Chile

Southern Thai – ภาษาไทยถิ่นใต้

- Spoken in: the southern area of Thailand, and some other parts of Southeast Asia

Southern Tutchone – Dän kʼè

- Spoken in: Yukon, Canada

Southern Uzbek – اۉزبېکچه ,اۉزبېکی ,اۉزبېک تورکچه‌سی

- Spoken in: Afghanistan

Southern Yukaghir – Одун ажуу

- Spoken in: Sakha Republic, Russia

Soyot † – сойыт тыл

- Formerly spoken in: Buryatia, Russia and Khövsgöl Province, Mongolia

Spanish – español, castellano

- Official language in: 22 countries, 1 dependent territory, and 26 international organisations

Spanish Sign Language – Lengua de Signos Española

- Signed in: Spain

Squamish – Sḵwx̱wú7mesh sníchim

- Spoken in: southwestern British Columbia, Canada

Sranan Tongo – Sranantongo

- Spoken in: Suriname

Sri Lankan Sign Language – ශ්‍රී ලංකා සංඥා භාෂාව

- Signed in: Sri Lanka

Standard Algerian Amazigh – Tamaziɣt, ثامازيغث, ⵜⴰⵎⴰⵣⵉⵖⵜ

- Official language in: Algeria

Standard Moroccan Amazigh – ⵜⴰⵎⴰⵣⵉⵖⵜ ⵜⴰⵏⴰⵡⴰⵢⵜ, tamaziɣt tanawayt

- Official language in: Morocco

Stoney – Nakoda, Nakota, Isga, Îyethka Îabi, Îyethka wîchoîe, Isga Iʔabi

- Spoken in: Alberta, Canada

Suabo – Inanwatan

- Spoken in: South Sorong Regency, Southwest Papua, Indonesia

Sudanese Arabic – لهجة سودانية

- Spoken in: Sudan

Sudest – Tagula

- Spoken in: Tagula Island, Milne Bay Province, Papua New Guinea

Sudovian † – Sūdaviskai

- Formerly spoken in: Lithuania and Poland

Sukuma – Kɪsukuma, Kisukuma

- Spoken in: Tanzania

Sumbawa – Basa Samawa, ᨅᨔ ᨔᨆᨓ

- Spoken in: Sumbawa, West Nusa Tenggara, Indonesia

Sumerian † – 𒅴𒂠 (EME.G̃IR_{15})

- Formerly spoken in: Southern Iraq and Southeastern Iran

Sumo – Sumu

- Spoken in: Nicaragua and Honduras

Sunam – sunnampakad

- Spoken in: Himachal Pradesh, India

Sundanese – ᮘᮞ ᮞᮥᮔ᮪ᮓ

- Official language in: the Indonesian province of West Java

Sunwar – सुनुवार, कोइँच, किराँती-कोइँच, मुखिया

- Official language in: Sikkim, India

Surajpuri – सुरजापुरी, সুরজাপুরী

- Official language in: India

Suret – ܣܘܪܝܬ

- Recognised Minority Language in: Iraq

Surigaonon – Tandaganon

- Regional language in: the Philippines

Susu – Sosoxui

- Spoken in: Guinea and Sierra Leone

Susuami – Susuami

- Spoken in: Morobe Province, Papua New Guinea

Svan – ლუშნუ ნინ

- Spoken in: Georgia

Swahili – Kiswahili

- Official language in: Kenya, Rwanda, Tanzania, and Uganda
- National language in: the Democratic Republic of the Congo
- Recognised Minority Language in: Burundi and Mozambique

Swazi – siSwati

- Official language in: Eswatini and South Africa

Swedish – svenska

- Official language in: Finland (including Åland), Sweden, and the European Union

Swedish Sign Language – Svenskt Teckenspråk

- Official language in: Sweden

Swiss German – Schwyzerdütsch

- Spoken in: the Austrian state of Vorarlberg, the Italian regions of the Aosta Valley, Liechtenstein, and Switzerland

Swiss-German Sign Language – Deutschschweizer Gebärdensprache

- Signed in: Liechtenstein, and Switzerland

Sylheti – ছিলটী, সিলেটী

- Spoken in: the Bangladeshi division of Greater Sylhet; the Indian state of Assam's Barak Valley; and the Indian state of Tripura

Syriac – ܠܫܢܐ ܣܘܪܝܝܐ

- Formerly spoken in: the Fertile Crescent and Eastern Arabia
- The Syriac language is a liturgical language of Syriac Christianity

=== T ===
Taa – ǃXóõ

- Spoken in: Ghanzi, Kgalagadi, Kweneng, Southern Districts, all in Botswana and Namibia

Tabasaran – табасаран чIал

- Official language in: Dagestan, Russia

Tae’ – Tae'

- Spoken in: South Sulawesi, Indonesia

Tagalog – ᜏᜒᜃᜅ᜔ ᜆᜄᜎᜓᜄ᜔, Wikang Tagalog

- Official language in: the Philippines

Tagish † – Tā̀gish

- Formerly spoken in: the Northwest Territories, Canada

Tahaggart – Tahaggart

- Recognised Minority Language in: Algeria, Libya and Niger

Tahitian – Reo Mā'ohi, Reo Tahiti

- Official language in: French Polynesia, France

Tahltan – Tałtan ẕāke, dah dẕāhge, didene keh

- Spoken in: Northern British Columbia, Canada

Tai Daeng – ꪼꪕꪵꪒꪉ

- Spoken in: Northwestern Vietnam and Northeastern Laos

Tai Dam – ꪺꪕꪒꪾ

- Spoken in: the Chinese county of the Jinping Miao, Yao, and Dai Autonomous County

Tai Dón – ꪼꪕ ꪒ꪿ꪮꪙ

- Spoken in: Laos, Vietnam and the Chinese county of the Jinping Miao, Yao, and Dai Autonomous County

Tai Khün – ไทเขิน

- Spoken in: Shan State, Myanmar and Thailand

Tai Lü – ᦑᦺᦟᦹᧉ

- Spoken in: Yunnan Province, China

Tai Nüa – ᥖᥭᥰᥖᥬᥳᥑᥨᥒᥰ

- Official language in: the Dehong Dai and Jingpo Autonomous Prefecture, China

Taíno † – Tainonaíki

- Formerly spoken in: Puerto Rico, the Bahamas, Cuba, Turks and Caicos, Haiti, the Dominican Republic, the US Virgin Islands (the United States), the British Virgin Islands (the United Kingdom), the United States (the states of Florida and New Jersey) etc.

Taita – Kidawida

- Spoken in: Taita Taveta County, Kenya

Taivoan † – Rara ka maka-Taivoan

- Formerly spoken in: Taiwan

Taiwan Sign Language – 台灣手語

- Signed in: Taiwan

Taiwanese – 臺語, Tâi-gí, Tâi-gú

- Official language in: Taiwan

Taʽizzi-Adeni Arabic – لهجة تعزية عدنية

- Spoken in: Taiz and Aden, Yemen

Tajik – Тоҷикӣ

- Official language in: Tajikistan

Takpa – དག་པ་ཁ་

- Spoken in: India, Bhutan and Tibet, China

Talossan – el glheþ Talossan

- A constructed language that was invented by Robert Ben Madison for his micronation of Talossa

Talysh – Tolışə zıvon, Tолышә зывон, تؤلشه زوؤن

- Spoken in: Iran and Azerbaijan

Tamang – तामाङ

- Official language in: Sikkim, India and Nepal

Tamasheq – Tamashek

- Official language in: Mali

Tamazight (Central Atlas) – ⵜⴰⵎⴰⵣⵉⵖⵜ, أمازيغية أطلس الأوسط

- Official language in: Morocco

Tamil – தமிழ்

- Official language in: Tamil Nadu and Puducherry, India, Singapore, and Sri Lanka
- Recognised Minority Language in: Malaysia and South Africa

Tanacross – Neeʼaanděgʼ

- Official language in: Alaska, the United States

Tanchangya – 𑄖𑄧𑄐𑄴𑄌𑄧𑄁𑄉𑄴𑄡

- Spoken in: Chittagong Hill Tracts, Bangladesh, Myanmar

Tangut † – 𗼇𗟲

- Formerly the Official language in: the Tangut Empire (Western Xia)

Tarahumara – Rarámuri ra'ícha

- Official language in: Mexico

Tarifit – Tmaziɣt, ⵜⴰⵔⵉⴼⵉⵜ, الريفية

- Spoken in: the Rif region in northern Morocco, Spain

Tarok – Ítarok

- Spoken in: Nigeria

Tat – zuhun tati, зугьун тати

- Official language in: Dagestan, Russia

Tatar – تاتارچا, Tatarça, Tатарча

- Official language in: Tatarstan, Russia

Taushiro – ?

- Spoken in: Peru
- Note: Only one speaker left.

Tausug – Bahasa Sūg

- Spoken in: Sulu, Philippines

Taveta – Kitubheta

- Spoken in: Taita Taveta County, Kenya

Tawellemmet – Tawəlləmmət, ⵜⵓⵍⵎⵓⵜ, تَاوَلَّمَّتْ

- Spoken in: Mali and Niger

Tawoyan – Tewoyan

- Spoken in: the eastern area of Central Kalimantan, Indonesia
- Note: Not to be confused with the Tavoyan dialect of Burmese.

Tay – Tiểng Tày, Thổ

- Spoken in: Vietnam

Tayo – Patois de Saint-Louis

- Spoken in Saint-Louis, New Caledonia

Tebul Dogon – Tebul Ure

- Spoken in: Mali

Teda – Tedaga

- Spoken in: Chad, Libya, and Niger

Tehuelche † – Aonekko ʼaʼien

- Formerly spoken in: Argentina, Chile

Tektitek – Bʼaʼaj

- Spoken in: Guatemala, and Chiapas, Mexico

Teleut – Телеңет тили

- Spoken in: Kemerovo Oblast, Russia

Telugu – తెలుగు

- Official language in: the Indian states of Andhra Pradesh and Telangana and town of Yanam

Tem – Tem

- Spoken in: Togo

Tembagla – Bo-Ung

- Spoken in: Southern Highlands Province, Papua New Guinea

Temiar – Nèhtuh Temèèr

- Spoken in: Kelantan, Pahang, Malaysia

Temne – KʌThemnɛ

- Spoken in: Sierra Leone and Guinea

Tepes – Soo

- Spoken in: Uganda

Terêna – Etelena, Emo'u xâne

- Spoken in: Mato Grosso do Sul, Brazil

Terengganu – Ccakak Tranung

- Spoken in: Terengganu, Malaysia

Teribe – Naso, Norteño, Quequexque, Teribe, Tiribi, or Térraba

- Spoken in: the Costa Rican provinces of Limón, and the Panamanian provinces of Bocas del Toro and Chiriquí

Ternate – ترناتي

- Spoken in: North Maluku, Indonesia

Ternateño † – Ternateño, Portugis

- Formerly spoken in: North Maluku, Indonesia

Teso – Ateso

- Spoken in: Uganda

Tetun – Lia-Tetun

- Official language in: Timor-Leste
- Recognised Minority Language in: East Nusa Tenggara, Indonesia

Tetun Dili – Tetun Dili

- Spoken in: Dili, Timor-Leste

Thado Chin – Thadou Kuki, Thadou pao

- Spoken in: Assam, Manipur, Nagaland, Mizoram and Tripura, India, Myanmar

Thai – ภาษาไทย

- Official language in: Thailand

Thai Sign Language – ภาษามือไทย

- Signed in: Thailand

Thangmi – थाङ्मी खाम

- Spoken in: Nepal and India

Thao – Thau a lalawa

- Spoken in: Taiwan

Thompson – Nłeʔkepmxcín

- Spoken in: British Columbia, Canada, the United States

Tibetan – དབུས་སྐད་

- Official language in: the Tibet Autonomous Region, China, Nepal

Tibetan Sign Language – བོད་ཀྱི་ལག་བརྡའི་བརྡ་སྤྲོད།

- Signed in: Tibet Autonomous Region, China

Ticuna – Duüxügu

- Spoken in: Amazonas Department, Colombia, Peru, Brazil

Tidore – ?

- Spoken in: Tidore, North Maluku, Indonesia

Tigre – ትግሬ, ትግራይት

- Recognised Minority Language in: Eritrea and Sudan

Tigrinya – ትግርኛ

- Official language in: Eritrea and Ethiopia

Tillamook † – Hutyáyu, Hutyéyu

- Formerly spoken in: Oregon, United States

Timucua † – ?

- Formerly spoken in: Georgia, United States

Tindi – Идараб мицци

- Spoken in: Southern Dagestan, Russia

Titan – Titan

- Spoken in: Manus Province, Papua New Guinea

Tiv – Tiv

- Spoken in: Benue State, Cross River State, Plateau State, and Taraba State, Nigeria

Tiwi – Tunuvivi

- Spoken in: Melville Island and Bathurst Island in Northern Territory, Australia

Tlingit – Lingít

- Official language in: Alaska, the United States

Toba – Qom l’aqtac

- Spoken in: Argentina and Paraguay

Toba-Maskoy – Enenlhet

- Spoken in: Alto Paraguay, Paraguay

Tobagonian Creole – ?

- Spoken in: Tobago part of Trinidad and Tobago

Tobati – Yotafa

- Spoken in: Papua, Indonesia

Tobian – Ramarih Hatohobei

- Official language in: Hatohobei, Palau

Tocharian A † – tkaṃ

- Formerly spoken in: Karasahr and Turpan, Tarim Basin, China

Tocharian B † – Kuśiññe

- Formerly spoken in: Kucha, Tarim Basin, China

Toda – தோடா

- Spoken in: Western Tamil Nadu, India

Tofa – Тоъфа дыл

- Spoken in: Irkutsk Oblast, Russia

Tojolabal – Tojol-ab'al

- Spoken in: Chiapas, Mexico

Tok Pisin – Tok Pisin

- Official language in: Papua New Guinea

Tokelauan – gagana Tokelau

- Official language in: Tokelau, New Zealand

Toki Pona – toki pona

- Constructed language spoken worldwide

Tokunoshima – シマユミィタ

- Spoken in: Kagoshima Prefecture, Japan

Tol – Tol

- Spoken in: Honduras

Tolaki – To'olaki

- Spoken in: Southeast Sulawesi, Indonesia

Toma – Lɔɠɔma

- Spoken in: Guinea

Tongan – Lea faka-Tonga

- Official language in: Tonga

Tongva † – Gabrielino

- Formerly spoken in: the City of Los Angeles, California, United States

Tonkawa † – Ticknawa•tic

- Formerly spoken in: Oklahoma, the United States

Tooro – Orutooro

- Spoken in: Uganda

Toraja-Sa’dan – Basa Tora'a

- Spoken in: South Sulawesi, Indonesia

Torres Strait Creole – Yumplatok

- Spoken in: Torres Strait Islands, Queensland, Australia

Torwali – توروالی

- Spoken in: Pakistan

Trinidadian Creole – ?

- Spoken in: Trinidad in Trinidad and Tobago

Trió – Tarëno ijomi

- Spoken in: Suriname, Brazil

Tsakhur – цӀаӀхна миз, ts'əxna miz

- Official language in: Dagestan, Russia

Tsakonian – τσακώνικα

- Spoken in: Tsakonia, Peloponnese, Greece

Tsetsaut † – Wetaŀ, Wetaɬ, Wetał

- Formerly spoken in: Alaska, the United States, Canada

Tsez – Цез Мец, Цезяс Мец

- Spoken in: Dagestan, Russia

Tshangla – ཆང་ལོ

- Spoken in: Bhutan; Arunachal Pradesh, India; and Tibet, China

Tsimshian – Sm'algya̱x

- Official language in: Alaska, the United States
- Also spoken in: British Columbia, Canada

Tsoa – Hiechware

- Official language in: Zimbabwe

Tsonga – Xitsonga

- Official language in: South Africa and Zimbabwe
- Recognised Minority Language in: Mozambique

Tsou – Cou

- Spoken in: Alishan Range, Taiwan

Tsuutʼina – Tsúùtʼínà Gūnáhà

- Spoken in: the Tsuutʼina Nation in Alberta, Canada

Tsuvadi – Tsuvaɗi

- Spoken in: Niger State, Nigeria

Tswa – Xitswa

- Spoken in: Mozambique

Tswana – Setswana

- Official language in: South Africa and Zimbabwe
- National language in: Botswana
- Recognised Minority Language in: Namibia

Tuamotuan – Reo Pa’umotu, Reko Pa’umotu

- Spoken in: Tuamotu Archipelago in French Polynesia

Tuareg – Tamahaq, Tamajaq, Tamasheq, or ⵜⴰⵎⴰⵌⴰⵆ

- Recognised Minority Language in: Mali and Niger

Tübatulabal – Pakaːnil

- Spoken in: California

Tucano – Dasea ye

- Spoken in: Vaupés Department, Colombia, and Amazonas, Brazil

Tujia – Bifzixsar, Mongrzzirhof

- Spoken in: Northwestern Hunan Province, China

Tulu – ತುಳು ಬಾಸೆ, തുളു ബാസെ, or

- Spoken in: the Indian states of Karnataka, Kerala, and Maharashtra

Tumbuka – Chitumbuka

- Recognised Minority Language in: Malawi, Zambia and Tanzania

Tumpoon – ទំពួន

- Spoken in: Cambodia

Tundra Enets – ?

- Spoken in: Dudinka, Krasnoyarsk Krai, Russia

Tundra Nenets – ненэця' вада

- Spoken in: Nenets Autonomous Okrug, Russia

Tungag – Lavongai

- Spoken in: New Hanover Island, New Ireland Province, Papua New Guinea

Tunica – Luhchi Yoroni

- Spoken in: Louisiana, United States

Tunisian Arabic – تونسي

- Spoken in: Tunisia

Tunisian Sign Language – لغة الإشارة التونسية

- Signed in: Tunisia

Tunzu – Itunzu, Duguza

- Spoken in: Plateau State and Bauchi State, Nigeria

Turkana – ŋatùrk(w)anà

- Spoken in: Kenya and Ethiopia

Turkish – Türkçe

- Official language in: Turkey, Cyprus, and Northern Cyprus
- Recognised Minority Language in: Bosnia and Herzegovina, Greece, Iraq, Kosovo, North Macedonia, and Romania

Turkish Sign Language – Türk İşaret Dili

- Signed in: Turkey

Turkmen – Türkmençe or Türkmen dili

- Official language in: Turkmenistan
- Recognised Minority Language in: Afghanistan

Turks and Caicos Creole – ?

- Spoken in: Turks and Caicos

Turoyo – ܛܘܪܝܐ

- Recognised Minority Language in: the Democratic Autonomous Administration of North and East Syria and Turkey

Tuscarora † – Ska꞉rù꞉ręʼ, Skarò˙rə̨ˀ

- Formerly spoken by: the Tuscarora people

Tututni – Dotodəni

- Spoken in: Oregon, the United States

Tuvaluan – Te Ggana Tuuvalu

- Official language in: Tuvalu

Tuvan – тыва дыл

- Spoken in: Tuva, Russia

Twana – tuwaduq

- Spoken in: Washington, United States

Twi – Twi

- Spoken in: Ghana

Tyap – A̱lyem Tyap

- Spoken in: Kaduna State and Plateau State, Nigeria

Tzeltal – Bats'il k'op

- Spoken in: Chiapas, Mexico

Tzotzil – Batsʼi kʼop

- Spoken in: Chiapas, Mexico

=== U ===
Uab Meto – Uab Metô

- Spoken in: West Timor in East Nusa Tenggara, Indonesia
- Recognised Minority Language in: Timor-Leste

Ubykh † – twaxəbza

- Formerly spoken in: Turkey

Udege – Удиэ кэйэвэни

- Spoken in: Khabarovsk Krai, Russia

Udi – удин муз, udin muz, 𐕒𐕡𐔳𐔼𐕎 𐕌𐕒𐕡𐔵

- Spoken in: Azerbaijan, Russia, and Georgia

Udmurt – Удмурт кыл

- Official language in: Udmurtia, Russia

Uduk – Tw'ampa or T'wampa

- Spoken in: South Sudan and Sudan

Ugandan Sign Language – Ugandan Sign Language

- Signed in: Uganda

Ugaritic † – ?

- Formerly spoken in: Syria

Ugong – 'Ugong

- Spoken in: western Thailand

Ukrainian – українська мова

- Official language in: Ukraine, Transnistria, and the Republic of Crimea
- Recognised Minority Language in: Bosnia and Herzegovina, Croatia, Czech Republic, Hungary, Moldova, Poland, Romania, Serbia, and Slovakia

Ukrainian Sign Language – Українська жестова мова

- Signed in: Ukraine

Ulch – Нāнʼи хэсэни

- Spoken in: Khabarovsk Krai, Russia

Ulithian – Yulidiy

- Spoken in: Ulithi Atoll, Federated States of Micronesia

Ulster Scots – Ulstèr-Scotch

- Recognised Minority Language in: Northern Ireland, the United Kingdom

Uma – Basa Uma, Uma

- Spoken in: Central Sulawesi, Indonesia

Umbrian † – Iuku Umbriu

- Formerly spoken in: central Italy

Umbundu – Umbundu

- Official language in: Angola

Unami – Wënami èlixsuwakàn

- Spoken in: Ontario, Canada, United States, formerly Delaware, New Jersey, and Pennsylvania, United States

Unde Kaili – ?

- Spoken in: Central Sulawesi, Indonesia

Unserdeutsch – Unserdeutsch

- Spoken in: Papua New Guinea and Australia

Upper Chehalis † – Q̉ʷay̓áyiłq̉

- Formerly spoken in: Washington, the United States

Upper Chinook † – Kiksht

- Formerly spoken in: Oregon, the United States

Upper Kuskokwim – Dinakʼi

- Official language in: Alaska, the United States

Upper Sorbian – Hornjoserbsce

- Spoken in: Saxony, Germany

Upper Tanana – Nee'aanèegn'

- Official language in: Alaska, the United States

Urak Lawoiʼ – อูรักลาโวยจ

- Spoken in: Phuket, Krabi, and Satun, Thailand

Urarina – Oruarinya

- Spoken in: Loreto, Peru

Urdu – اُردُو

- Official language in: Pakistan, and Jammu and Kashmir, Ladakh, Delhi, Bihar, Uttar Pradesh, Jharkhand, Andhra Pradesh, Telangana, and West Bengal, India
- Recognised Minority Language in: South Africa

Urhobo – Urhobo

- Spoken in: Delta State and Edo State, Nigeria

Uruguayan Sign Language – Lengua de señas uruguaya

- Signed in: Uruguay

Urum – Урум, Ουρούμ

- Recognised Minority Language in: Georgia, Greece and Ukraine

Uspanteco – uspantek

- Spoken in: Guatemala

Uyghur – ئۇيغۇر تىلى

- Official language in: the Chinese autonomous region of Xinjiang
- Recognised Minority Language in: Kazakhstan

Uzbek – اوزبیک, Ўзбек, Oʻzbek

- Official language in: Uzbekistan

=== V ===
Vaagri Booli – ஃஅக்கிபிக்கி

- Spoken in: Tamil Nadu, Andhra Pradesh, Puducherry, Karnataka, Maharashtra, and all in India

Vai – ꕙꔤ

- Spoken in: Liberia and Sierra Leone

Valencian – Valencià

- Official language in: the Spanish autonomous community of Valencia

Valencian Sign Language – Llengua de signes valenciana

- Signed in: the Spanish autonomous community of Valencia

Vayu – वायु, हायु

- Spoken in: Bagmati Province, Nepal

Vedda – වැදි

- Spoken in: Uva Province of Sri Lanka

Venda – Tshivenḓa

- Official language in: South Africa and Zimbabwe

Venetian – Vèneto

- Official language in: the Italian region of Veneto

Venezuelan Sign Language – Lengua de señas venezolana

- Signed in: Venezuela

Veps – vepsän kelʹ

- Recognised Minority Language in: Karelia, Russia

Vietnamese – tiếng Việt

- Official language in: Vietnam
- Recognised Minority Language in: Czech Republic and Slovakia

Vietnamese Sign Language – Ngôn ngữ ký hiệu Việt Nam

- Signed in: Vietnam

Vilela † – ?

- Formerly spoken in: Resistencia, Chaco, Argentina

Vincentian Creole – ?

- Spoken in: Saint Vincent and the Grenadines

Virgin Islands Creole – ?

- Spoken in: British Virgin Islands, US Virgin Islands, Spanish Virgin Islands (Puerto Rico, Sint Eustatius, Saint Martin, and Sint Maarten

Vlax Romani – řomani čhib

- Generally spoken in: Southeastern Europe

Volapük – Volapük

- International auxiliary language invented by Johann Martin Schleyer

Võro – Võro Kiil

- Spoken by: the Võro people of Estonia

Voro (Adamawa) – Vɔrɔ

- Spoken in: Adamawa State, Nigeria

Votic – Vaddja

- Spoken in: Ingria in Russia

=== W ===
Wa – Va

- Spoken in: China, Laos, Myanmar, Thailand

Waimajã – Bará

- Spoken in: Colombia and Brazil

Waimiri-Atroarí – Kinja Iara

- Spoken in: the northern part of Amazonas, Brazil

Wakhi – ښیکوار زیک, Х̆икв̆ор зик, X̌ikwor zik

- Spoken in: Wakhan District in Badakhshan Province, Afghanistan, and neighboring areas of Tajikistan, Pakistan and China

Wali – Waale, Waalii

- Spoken in: Ghana

Wallisian – Fakaʻuvea

- Spoken in: Wallis, Wallis and Futuna, France; and the island of Ouvéa in New Caledonia

Walloon – Walon

- Spoken in: the Belgian region of Wallonia

Wamey – Wameỹ

- Spoken in: Guinea and Senegal

Wampanoag † – Wôpanâak

- Formerly spoken in: Massachusetts, United States

Waorani – Wao Tededö

- Spoken in: Ecuador and Peru

Wapan – Jukun Wapan

- Spoken in: Taraba State, Plateau State, and Nasarawa State, Nigeria

Warao – Guarauno, Warrau

- Spoken in: Venezuela, Guyana and Suriname

Waray – Winaray, Binisayâ nga Winaray

- Regional language in: the Philippines

Warlpiri – Warlpiri

- Spoken in: the Australian Northern Territory

Warumungu – Warramunga

- Spoken in: Northern Territory, Australia

Washo – wá·šiw ʔítlu

- Spoken in: the states of California, the United States

Wayampi – Wajãpi

- Spoken in: Amapá, Brazil, France

Wayana – Wayâna

- Spoken in: Sipaliwini, Suriname, Brazil

Wayuu – Wayuunaiki

- Spoken in: Venezuela and Colombia

Waziri – وزیری

- Spoken in: Waziristan, Pakistan

Weenhayek – 'weenhayeklhayhi', 'weenhayeklhàmet

- Official language in: Bolivia

Welsh – Cymraeg

- Official language in: Wales, the United Kingdom
- Recognised Minority Language in: Y Wladfa, Chubut, Argentina and the United Kingdom

West Albay Bikol – ?

- Spoken in: Western Albay, in the Bicol region of the Philippines

West Coast Bajau – Bajau Sama

- Spoken in: Sabah, Malaysia

Western Bru – บรู

- Spoken in: Laos and Thailand

Western Neo-Aramaic – ܣܪܝܘܢ (ܐܰܪܳܡܰܝ)

- Spoken in: Syria

Western Tunebo – ?

- Spoken in: Santander Department, Colombia

Western Yugur – yoğır lar, yoğır śoz

- Spoken in: Gansu, China

Wichita † – Kirikirʔi:s

- Formerly spoken in: Oklahoma, the United States

Wintu – wintʰuːh

- Spoken in: California, the United States

Wipi – Wipi

- Spoken in: Western Province, Papua New Guinea

Wiradjuri – Wiradhuray, Wiradyuray

- Spoken in: New South Wales, Australia

Wiyot † – Soulatluk

- Formerly spoken in: Northwestern California, the United States

Wolaytta – Wolayttatto Doonaa

- Official language in: Wolayita Zone, Ethiopia

Wolof – Wolof

- Spoken in: the Gambia,Mauritania, and Senegal

Wounaan – Woun Meu, Wounaan Meu

- Spoken in: Chocó Department, Colombia; and Panama

Wu – 吴方言

- Spoken in: the southern region of the Chinese province of Jiangsu, the entire province of Zhejiang, and the municipality of Shanghai

Wuvulu-Aua – Wuvulu

- Spoken in: Manus Province, Papua New Guinea

Wymysorys – Wymysiöeryś

- Spoken in: Wilamowice, Silesian Voivodeship, Poland

=== X ===
Xaracuu – Kanala, Xârâcùù

- Spoken in: the French special collectivity of New Caledonia

Xavánte – A’uwẽ

- Spoken in: Mato Grosso, Brazil

Xerénte – Akwẽ

- Spoken in: Tocantins, Brazil

Xhosa – isiXhosa

- Official language in: South Africa and Zimbabwe

Xiang – 湘语

- Spoken in: the northern region of the Chinese province of Guangxi and the central and southwestern regions of the province of Hunan

Xibe – ᠰᡞᠪᡝᡤᡞᠰᡠᠨ

- Spoken in: the Chinese autonomous region of Xinjiang

Xinca † – ?

- Formerly spoken in: southeastern Guatemala, parts of El Salvador, and Honduras

Xipaya – ?

- Spoken in: Altamira, Pará, Brazil

Xiriâna † – Bahwana

- Formerly spoken in: Brazil

Xokleng – šokléng

- Spoken in: Santa Catarina, Brazil

Xong – Dut Xonb

- Spoken in: southeastern China

Xucuru † – Xukurú

- Formerly spoken in: Pernambuco, Brazil

=== Y ===
Yabem – Jabêm

- Spoken in: Finschhafen District, Morobe Province, Papua New Guinea

Yace – Yache

- Spoken in: Cross River State, Nigeria

Yaeyama – 八重山物言, ヤイマムニ

- Spoken in: Okinawa Prefecture, Japan

Yaghnobi – Яғнобӣ зивок

- Spoken in: Tajikistan

Yahgan † – Háusi Kúta, Yágankuta

- Formerly spoken in: Magallanes, Chile, Argentina

Yakan – Yakan

- Regional language in: the Philippines

Yakkha – याक्खा

- Spoken in: Nepal and Sikkim, India

Yakima – ?

- Spoken in: Washington, the United States

Yakut – Саха тыла

- Official language in: Yakutia or Sakha in Russia

Yalunka – Jalonke, Dialonke, jalunga xuwiina'

- Spoken in: Guinea, Sierra Leone, Mali, and Senegal

Yamben – Yaben

- Spoken in: Sumgilbar Rural LLG in Madang Province, Papua New Guinea

Yami – ciciring no Tao

- Spoken in: Orchid Island, Taiwan

Yanesha' – Yanešač̣ or Yaneshac̈h

- Spoken in: Pasco, Peru

Yangum – Aiku

- Spoken in: Sandaun Province, Papua New Guinea

Yankunytjatjara – Yankunytjatjara, Yankuntatjara, Jangkundjara, Kulpantja

- Spoken in: South Australia, Australia

Yanomamö – Yąnomamɨ

- Spoken in: Amazonas, Venezuela, Brazil

Yanyuwa – Yanyuwa

- Spoken in: Northern Territory, Australia

Yao – chiYao

- Recognised Minority Language in: Malawi
- Also spoken in: Mozambique and Tanzania

Yaosakor Asmat – Asmat

- Spoken in: South Papua, Indonesia

Yapese – Thin nu Waqaab

- Official language in: Yap, the Federated States of Micronesia

Yaqui – Yoem Noki

- Spoken in: Sonora, Mexico, the United States

Yasa – Iyasa

- Spoken in: Cameroon, Equatorial Guinea, and Gabon

Yau – Yaö

- Spoken in: Morobe Province, Papua New Guinea
- Note: There is another language called Yau in Papua New Guinea, spoken in the province of Sandaun. The Yau language spoken in Morobe Province belongs to the Trans-New Guinea language family, and the Yau language spoken in Sandaun Province belongs to the Torricelli language family.

Yazgulami – Zǵamiǵai, Зѓамиѓай

- Recognised Minority Language in: Tajikistan

Yele – Yélî Dnye

- Spoken in: Rossel Island, Louisiade Archipelago in Milne Bay Province, Papua New Guinea

Yemba – Ashuŋne yémba

- Spoken in: West Region, Cameroon

Yemeni Arabic – اللهجة اليمنية

- Spoken in: Yemen and southwestern Saudi Arabia

Yemeni Sign Language – لغة الإشارة اليمنية

- Signed in: Yemen

Yetfa – Biksi, Biaksi, Inisine

- Spoken in: Highland Papua, Indonesia, Papua New Guinea

Yevanic – יעואני גלוסא, γεβανί γλώσσα

- Spoken in: Greece, Israel, Turkey, United States

Yeyi – Shiyeyi

- Spoken in: Botswana and Namibia

Yiddish – ייִדיש

- Official language in: the Jewish Autonomous Oblast, Russia
- Recognised Minority Language in: Bosnia and Herzegovina, Israel, the Netherlands, Poland, Romania, Sweden, and Ukraine

Yilan Creole – ?

- Spoken in: Yilan County, Taiwan

Yine – Yine, Yineru tokanu

- Spoken in: some areas of the rivers of Urubamba, Ucayali and Madre de Dios and some of their tributaries (Ucayali, Cusco, Loreto, and Madre de Dios, Peru)

Yipma - Yɨꞌmayagaala

- Spoken in: Eastern Highlands Province, Papua New Guinea

Yola † – Yola

- Formerly spoken in: County Wexford, Ireland

Yoloxóchitl Mixtec – ?

- Spoken in: Guerrero, Mexico

Yombe – Kiyombe

- Spoken in: the Democratic Republic of the Congo, Cabinda in Angola; and the Republic of the Congo

Yonaguni – 与那国物言, ドゥナンムヌイ

- Spoken in: Okinawa Prefecture, Japan

Yonggom – Yonggom, Yongkom

- Spoken in: Western Province in Papua New Guinea and Boven Digoel Regency, South Papua in Indonesia

Yoron – ユンヌフトゥバ

- Spoken in: Kagoshima Prefecture, Japan

Yoruba – Èdè Yorùbá

- Official language in: Nigeria

Youjiang Zhuang – Gangjdoj

- Spoken in: Guangxi, China

Yucatec Maya – mayaʼ tʼaan, maayaʼ tʼaan

- Official language in: Mexico

Yucatec Maya Sign Language – ?

- Signed in: Yucatán, Mexico

Yuchi – Tsoyaha

- Spoken in: Oklahoma, the United States

Yucuna – Jukuna

- Spoken in: along the Miritiparaná River in Colombia

Yue – 粵語, 粤语, 廣東話, or 广东话

- Spoken in: the Chinese province of Guangdong and the autonomous region of Guangxi

Yugh † – Дьук

- Formerly spoken along: the Yenisei River in Russia

Yugoslav Sign Language – ?

- Spoken in: Nations of former Yugoslavia

Yurok – Pueleekla’

- Spoken in: Northwestern California, the United States

Yuwei – Yu We

- Spoken in: Jiwaka Province, Papua New Guinea

=== Z ===
Zaghawa – Beria

- Spoken in: Sudan and Chad

Zaiwa – Tsaiwa, Tsaiva

- Spoken in: southwestern area of China and Myanmar

Zande – Pazande

- Spoken in: the Democratic Republic of the Congo, the Central African Republic and South Sudan

Zapotec – Diidxazá, Dizhsa

- Spoken in: the Mexican states of Oaxaca, Veracruz, Guerrero and Puebla

Zarma – Zarma ciine, Zarma sanni, زَرْمَ ݘِينٜ ,زَرْمَ سَنِّ

- Spoken in: Niger, Mali, Burkina Faso, Nigeria

Zauzou – Rouruo

- Spoken in: Yunnan, China

Zaza – Zazaki

- Spoken in: Tunceli, Bingöl, Erzincan and Diyarbakır

Zeelandic – Zeêuws

- Spoken in: Zeeland, the Netherlands

Zenaga – ⵜⵓⵥⵥⵓⵏⴳⵉⵢⵢⴰ

- Recognised Minority Language in: Mauritania

Zhuang – Vahcuengh, 話壯

- Spoken in: the southern areas of China

Zimbabwean Sign Language – Zimsign

- Official language in: Zimbabwe

Zoroastrian Dari – فارسی ,دری ,دريلو, or Yazdi

- The Dari language is used by some Zoroastrians in Central Iran
- Note: the Zoroastrian Dari language is also called Dari, which shouldn't be confused with the variety of Persian language spoken in Afghanistan

Zou – Zo

- Spoken in: Chin State, Myanmar; Mizoram and Manipur, India

Zulgo-Gemzek – ?

- Spoken in: Cameroon

Zulu – isiZulu

- Official language in: South Africa

Zuni – Shiwi’ma

- Spoken in: New Mexico and Arizona in the United States

Zuojiang Zhuang – 話僮

- Spoken in: the Chinese autonomous region of Guangxi

Zyphe Chin – Zophei

- Spoken in: Chin State and India

=== ǀ ===
ǀXam † – ǀKham, ǀKhuai

- Formerly spoken in: South Africa and Lesotho

=== ǁ ===
ǁXegwi † – giǁkxi꞉gwi

- Formerly spoken at: Lake Chrissie, South Africa

=== ǂ ===
ǂʼAmkoe – ǂʼAmkoe, ǂHoan

- Spoken in: Kweneng District, Botswana

== Alphabets and scripts ==
' · A · B · C · D · E · F · G · H · I · J · K · L · M · N · O · P · R · S · T · V · W · Y

† = Extinct script or alphabet

=== ' ===
'Phags-pa † – ꡖꡍꡂꡛ ꡌ

- Formerly Used in: China, India, Mongolia, and Greater Tibet

=== A ===
Abkhaz – Aҧсшәа

- Used in: Abkhazia and the Autonomous Republic of Abkhazia, Georgia

Adlam – 𞤀𞤣𞤤𞤢𞤥 𞤆𞤵𞤤𞤢𞤪

- Used in: West Africa

Afaka –

- Used in: Suriname

Ahom † – 𑜒𑜑𑜪𑜨

- Formerly used in: Assam, India

Anglo-Saxon † – ᚠᚢᚦᚩᚱᚳ

- Formerly Used in: Anglo-Saxon England

Arabic – الْأَبْجَدِيَّة الْعَرَبِيَّة

- Used in: primarily the Middle East and North Africa, but also in Southeast Asia, the northern areas of Sub-Saharan Africa, and the United Nations

Armenian – Հայկական Այբուբեն

- Used in: Armenia, Cyprus, Iran, Poland, Romania, and the United States

Aurebesh – Aurebesh

- Constructed script used for Galactic Basic, a fictional lingua franca

Avestan – 𐬆𐬬𐬈𐬯𐬙𐬆𐬥

- Formerly used in: the Eastern Iranian Plateau
- The Avestan alphabet is a Zoroastrian liturgical script

=== B ===
Balinese – ᬅᬓ᭄ᬱᬭᬩᬮᬶ

- Used in: Bali, Indonesia

Bamum † – ꚶꛉ꛰꛲ꚫꛦꚳ

- Formerly used in: Western Cameroon

Basahan † – Guhit

- Formerly used in: Bicol Region, Philippines

Bassa Vah – 𖫔𖫧𖫳𖫒𖫨𖫰𖫨𖫱 𖫣𖫧𖫱

- Used in: Liberia, Ivory Coast, and Sierra Leone

Batak – ᯅᯖᯂ᯲

- Used in: North Sumatra, Indonesia

Baybayin † – ᜊᜌ᜔ᜊᜌᜒᜈ᜔

- Formerly used in: the Philippines. Ongoing revival efforts exist

Bengali–Assamese – বাংলা-অসমীয়া

- Used in: Bangladesh and the regions of West Bengal, Assam, Meghalaya, Tripura, Mizoram, Nagaland and Andaman and Nicobar Islands in India

Blissymbols –

- Blissymbols is a constructed language using ideographs invented by Charles K. Bliss after the Second World War.

Bopomofo – ㄓㄨˋ ㄧㄣ ㄈㄨˊ ㄏㄠˋ

- Used in: China

Borama – 𐒄𐒋𐒦𐒩𐒗𐒓

- Used in: Somalia

Brahmi † – 𑀩𑁆𑀭𑀸𑀳𑁆𑀫𑀻

- Formerly used in: Ancient India

Braille – ⠃⠗⠁⠊⠇⠑

- Braille is a tactile writing system, versions of which are used for many different languages and also used for the blind.

Buhid – ᝊᝓᝑᝒ

- Used in: Mindoro, the Philippines

=== C ===
Canadian Aboriginal syllabics – ᖃᓂᐅᔮᖅᐸᐃᑦ, ᑎᑎᕋᐅᓯᖅ ᓄᑖᖅ, ᓀᐦᐃᔭᐍᐏᐣ, ᐊᓂᐦᔑᓈᐯᒧᐎᓐ, ᑯᖾᖹ ᖿᐟᖻ ᓱᖽᐧᖿ, ᑐᑊᘁᗕᑋᗸ

- Used in: Canada

Carian † – 𐊴𐊠𐊥𐊹𐊠𐊵

- Formerly used in: Western Anatolia

Chakma – 𑄌𑄋𑄴𑄟𑄳𑄦 𑄃𑄧𑄏𑄛𑄖𑄴

- Used in: Chittagong Hill Tracts in Bangladesh and Mizoram, Tripura, Arunachal Pradesh, Assam in India

Cham – ꨀꨇꩉ ꨌꩌ

- Used in: Cambodia and the southern area of Vietnam

Cherokee – ᏣᎳᎩ

- Used in: Cherokee Nation, Oklahoma, the United States

Chinese – 汉语, 漢語

- Used in: the Sinosphere

Cirth –

- Constructed script used by the Elves in the Middle-earth

Coptic † – ϯⲙⲉⲧⲣⲉⲙⲛ̀ⲭⲏⲙⲓ

- Liturgically used by: Copts

Cuneiform † – 𒋾𒀝𒁇

- Formerly used in: the Ancient Near East

Cypriot † – 𐠀𐠜𐠍𐠚

- Formerly used in: Arcadia and Cyprus

Cyrillic – Кѷрїлловица, Кирилица, Кириллица

- Used in: Bulgaria, North Macedonia, Serbia, Montenegro, Republika Srpska, Ukraine, Belarus, Transnistria, other Post-Soviet states, the European Union, the United Nations and elsewhere

=== D ===
Deseret – 𐐔𐐯𐑅𐐨𐑉𐐯𐐻

- The Deseret alphabet is a Mormon liturgical script

Devanagari – देवनागरी

- Used in: the Indian subcontinent, mainly in the northern areas of India and in Nepal

=== E ===
Egyptian hieroglyphs † – 𓂋𓏺𓈖 𓆎𓅓𓏏𓊖

- Formerly used in: Ancient Egypt

Elder Futhark † – ᚠᚢᚦᚨᚱᚲ

- Formerly used by: Germanics from 1st to 9th Century AD

Etruscan † – 𐌓𐌀𐌔𐌄𐌍𐌍𐌀

- Formerly used in: the Etruscan civilization

=== F ===
Fraser – ꓡꓲ-ꓢꓴ

- Used in: Yunnan, China

=== G ===
Garay – 𐵹𐵊𐵾𐵊𐵼

- Used in: Senegambia (Senegal and The Gambia)

Geʽez – ግዕዝ

- Used in: Ethiopia and Eritrea

Georgian – ქართული

- Used in: Georgia

Glagolitic † – ⰍⱛⰓⰊⰎⰎⰑⰂⱄⰜⰀ

- Formerly used by: the Middle Age Slavic people

Gothic † – 𐌲𐌿𐍄𐌹𐍃𐌺

- Formerly used by: the Goths

Grantha † – 𑌗𑍍𑌰𑌨𑍍𑌥

- Formerly used in: Tamil Nadu and Kerala, India

Greek – Ελληνικό αλφάβητο

- Used in: Greece, Cyprus and the European Union

Gujarati – ગુજરાતી

- Used in: Gujarat and Dadra and Nagar Haveli and Daman and Diu, India

Gunjala Gondi – 𑵶𑶍𑶕𑶀𑵵𑶊 𑵶𑶓𑶕𑶂𑶋 𑵵𑶋𑶅𑶋

- Used in: the Gondwana region, India

Gurmukhi – ਗੁਰਮੁਖੀ

- Used in: Punjab, India

=== H ===
Hangul – 한글, 조선글

- Used in: South Korea, North Korea, Indonesia

Hanifi Rohingya – 𐴌𐴟𐴇𐴥𐴝𐴚𐴒𐴙𐴝 𐴇𐴝𐴕𐴞𐴉𐴞 𐴓𐴠𐴑𐴤𐴝

- Used in: Rakhine State, Myanmar and in Chittagong Division, Bangladesh

Hanunó'o – ᜱᜨᜳᜨᜳᜢ

- Used in: Mindoro, the Philippines

Hebrew – אָלֶף־בֵּית עִבְרִי

- Used by: the Jews in Israel and worldwide

Hiragana – 平仮名, ひらがな

- Used in: Japan

=== I ===
Indus (Harappan) † – ?

- Undeciphered script assumed to have been used for Harappan language

International Phonetic Alphabet (IPA) – [aɪ̯ pʰiː eɪ̯]

- Used as: a standard written representation for the sounds of speech

=== J ===
Japanese writing system – 日本語の表記体系

- Used in: Japan

Javanese – ꦲꦏ꧀ꦱꦫꦗꦮ

- Used in: Central Java, East Java, Lampung, and Yogyakarta, Indonesia

=== K ===
Kaithi – 𑂍𑂶𑂟𑂲

- Used in: Uttar Pradesh, Bihar, and Jharkhand, India

Kannada – ಕನ್ನಡ

- Used in: Karnataka and the extremely northern area of Kerala, India

Katakana – 片仮名, カタカナ

- Used in: Japan
- Formerly used in: Palau

Kayah Li – ꤊꤢꤛꤢꤟ ꤜꤤ

- Used in: the Kayah State, Myanmar

Khitan (Large) † –

- Formerly used in: China, Mongolia, and eastern Siberia, Russia

Khitan (Small) † –

- Formerly used in: China, Mongolia, and eastern Siberia, Russia

Khmer – អក្សរខ្មែរ

- Used in: Cambodia

Kulitan † –

- Formerly used in: Pampanga, Philippines

=== L ===
Lao – ອັກສອນລາວ

- Used in: Laos

Latin – Latina, Romana, Latin

- Used in: Most parts of the world
- Originated in: Latium (modern-day Rome, Italy)

Lepcha – ᰛᰩᰵᰛᰧᰵ

- Used in: Sikkim, India

Limbu – ᤕᤠᤰᤌᤢᤱ ᤐᤠᤴ

- Used in: Koshi Province, Nepal and Sikkim, India

Lontara – ᨒᨚᨈᨑ

- Used in: South Sulawesi, West Sulawesi, Indonesia

=== M ===
Malayalam – മലയാളലിപി

- Used in: Kerala, Lakshadweep and Puducherry (Mahe district), India

Mandaic – ࡓࡀࡈࡍࡀ

- Liturgically used by: the Mandaeans

Mandombe –

- Used in: West Africa

Masaram Gondi – 𑴤𑴫𑴦𑴱𑴤 𑴎𑴽𑵀𑴘𑴳

- Used in: the Gondwana region, India

Meitei Mayek – ꯃꯩꯇꯩ ꯃꯌꯦꯛ

- Used in: Manipur and Assam, India

Mende Kikakui – 𞠀𞠁𞠂

- Used in: Sierra Leone, Liberia, and Guinea

Modi † – 𑘦𑘻𑘚𑘲

- Formerly used in: Maharashtra, India

Mon–Burmese – မွန်မြန်မာအက္ခရာ

- Used in: Myanmar

Mongolian – ᠮᠣᠩᠭᠣᠯ ᠪᠢᠴᠢᠭ

- Used in: Mongolia, Inner Mongolia and other parts of northern China

Mru – 𖩃𖩓𖩑

- Used in: Chittagong Hill Tracts, Bangladesh, Myanmar

=== N ===
Nandinagari † – 𑧁𑧞𑦿𑧒𑧁𑧑𑦰𑧈𑧓

- Formerly used in: Southern India

New Tai Lue – ᦟᦲᧅᦷᦎᦺᦑᦟᦹᧉ

- Used in: Southeast Asia

Newar – 𑐣𑐾𑐥𑐵𑐮 𑐮𑐶𑐥𑐶

- Used in: Nepal

N'Ko – ߒߞߏ

- Used in: West Africa, specifically Burkina Faso, The Gambia, Guinea, Guinea-Bissau, Ivory Coast, Mali, and Senegal

Nüshu † – 𛆁𛈬

- Formerly used in: Jiangyong, Hunan, China

Nyiakeng Puachue Hmong – 𞄀𞄩𞄰𞄁𞄓𞄱𞄂𞄤𞄳𞄬𞄃𞄤𞄳

- Used in: China, Vietnam, Laos, Myanmar and Thailand

=== O ===
Odia – ଓଡ଼ିଆ

- Used in: Odisha, India

Ogham † – ᚛ᚑᚌᚐᚋ᚜

- Formerly used in: Ireland, Isle of Man, Wales, Cornwall and Scotland

Ol Chiki – ᱚᱞ ᱪᱤᱠᱤ

- Used in: Jharkhand and West Bengal, India

Osage † – 𐓏𐓘𐓻𐓘𐓻𐓟 𐒻𐓟

- Formerly used in: Osage Nation, Oklahoma, the United States

Osmanya – 𐒋𐒘𐒈𐒑𐒛𐒒𐒕𐒀

- Used in: Somalia

=== P ===
Pahawh Hmong – 𖬖𖬲𖬝𖬵 𖬄𖬲𖬟 𖬌𖬣𖬵

- Used in: China, Vietnam, Laos, Myanmar and Thailand

Palmyrene † – ?

- Formerly used in: the Syrian desert

Pau Cin Hau † – 𑫀𑫙 𑫍𑫗𑫠 𑫈𑫙

- Formerly used in: Chin State, Sagaing Region of Myanmar and in Manipur, Mizoram of India

Phoenician † – 𐤐𐤍𐤍𐤌 ,𐤊𐤍𐤀𐤍𐤌

- Formerly used by: Phoenicians

Pollard – 𖽃𖽔𖾐 𖽑𖼄𖽻𖾐

- Used in: China, Vietnam, Laos, Myanmar and Thailand

Proto-Sinaitic † – ?

- Formerly used in: the Sinai Peninsula and Middle Egypt

=== R ===
Rejang – ꥆꤰ꥓ꤼꤽ ꤽꥍꤺꥏ

- Used in: Bengkulu, Indonesia

Rongorongo † – ?

- Undeciphered script assumed to have been used for Rapa Nui language

Runic † – ᚱᚢᚾᛟ

- Formerly Used by: 2nd Century Germanics

=== S ===
Samaritan † – ࠏࠁࠓࠉࠕ ,ࠀࠓࠌࠉࠕ

- Liturgically used by: the Samaritans

Saurashtra – ꢱꣃꢬꢵꢰ꣄ꢜ꣄ꢬ

- Used in: Tamil Nadu, Andhra Pradesh, and Karnataka, India

Shavian – 𐑖𐑱𐑝𐑾𐑯

- Invented by Ronald Kingsley Read as an alternative phonetic alphabet to the English language.

Siddhaṃ † – 𑖭𑖰𑖟𑖿𑖠𑖽

- Formerly used in: Central Asia, Japan

Simplified Chinese – 汉语

- Used in: China, Singapore and the United Nations

Sinhala – සිංහල

- Used in: Sri Lanka

Sitelen Pona –

- Used by: Toki Pona speakers

Sorang Sompeng – 𑃐𑃦𑃝𑃗 𑃐𑃦𑃖𑃛𑃣𑃗

- Used in: Odisha and Andhra Pradesh, India

Sundanese – ᮃᮊ᮪ᮞᮛ ᮞᮥᮔ᮪ᮓ

- Used in: West Java, Banten, Indonesia

Sylheti Nagri – ꠍꠤꠟꠐꠤ ꠘꠣꠉꠞꠤ

- Used in: Sylhet Division, Bangladesh and Barak Valley of Assam, India

Syriac – ܐܠܦ ܒܝܬ ܣܘܪܝܝܐ

- Used by: Assyrians

=== T ===
Tagbanwa – ᝦᝪᝨᝯ

- Used in: Palawan, Philippines

Tai Le – ᥖᥭᥰ ᥘᥫᥴ

- Used in: Southeast Asia

Tai Tham – ᨲ᩠ᩅᩫᨾᩮᩬᩥᨦ

- Used in: Southeast Asia

Tai Viet – ꪎꪳ ꪼꪕ

- Used in: Southeast Asia

Tamil – தமிழ்

- Used in: Tamil Nadu and Puducherry (Karaikal and Puducherry districts) in India, but also in Sri Lanka, Malaysia, and Singapore

Telugu – తెలుగు

- Used in: Andhra Pradesh, Telangana and Puducherry (Yanam district), India

Tengwar –

- Constructed script used by the Elves in the Middle-earth

Thaana – ތާނަ

- Used in: Maldives

Thai – อักษรไทย

- Used in: Thailand

Tibetan – བོད་ཡིག་

- Used in: Tibet, Bhutan, Nepal, and Ladakh, Sikkim, Arunachal Pradesh in India

Tifinagh – ⵜⴼⵏⵗ, ⵜⵉⴼⵉⵏⴰⵖ

- Used in: Mali, Niger, Algeria, Libya, and Burkina Faso

Tirhuta – 𑒞𑒱𑒩𑒯𑒳𑒞𑒰

- Formerly used in: the Mithila region in India and Nepal

Traditional Chinese – 漢語

- Used in: Taiwan, Hong Kong and Macau

=== V ===
Vai – ꕙꔤ

- Used in: Western Liberia

=== W ===
Wancho – 𞋒𞋀𞋉𞋃𞋕

- Used in: southeastern Longding district, Tirap district in Arunachal Pradesh, India

Warang Citi – 𑢹𑣗𑣁𑣜𑣊 𑢯𑣂𑣕𑣂

- Used in: Jharkhand, Odisha, West Bengal and Assam, India

=== Y ===
Yi – ꆈꌠꁱꂷ

- Used in: Southern Sichuan and Northern Yunnan, China

Younger Futhark † – ᚠᚢᚦᚨᚱᚲ

- Formerly used by: Norsemen from 8th to 13th Century AD

== Dialects ==
A · B · C · D · E · F · G · H · I · J · K · L · M · N · O · P · Q · R · S · T · U · V · W · Y · Z · ǂ

† = Extinct dialect

=== A ===
Acadian French – français acadien, acadjonne

- Spoken in: Acadia, Canada

Achterhooks – achterhooks

- Spoken in: Achterhoek, the Netherlands

Adamawa Fulfulde – Fulfulde, ڢُلْڢُلْدٜ

- Spoken in: Cameroon, Chad, and Nigeria

Adjaran – აჭარული

- Spoken in: Adjara, Georgia

African-American Vernacular English – African-American Vernacular English, Black Vernacular English

- Spoken by: African Americans

Alaskan Russian – Аляскинско-русский, Аляскинский русский

- Spoken in: Alaska, the United States

Albanian (Gheg) – gegnisht

- Spoken in: Albania

Albanian (Tosk) – toskërisht

- Spoken in: Albania

Alemannic German – Alemannisch

- Spoken in: Liechtenstein, most parts of Switzerland, and in parts of Austria, France, Germany, Italy, United States, and Venezuela

American English – American English

- Spoken in: United States

American Finnish – Fingliska, Fingelska

- Spoken in: Upper Peninsula of Michigan, Wisconsin, and Minnesota, United States

Amoy – 廈門話 or 厦门话

- Spoken in: the southern area of the Chinese province of Fujian

Andalusian Spanish – andaluz

- Spoken in: Andalusia, Ceuta, and Melilla, Spain, United Kingdom

Andean Spanish – Español andino

- Spoken in: Andes region of South America

Anglo-English – Anglo-English, English English

- Spoken in: England, the United Kingdom

Antarctic English – Antarctic English

- Spoken in: Antarctica

Antiguan and Barbudan English – Antiguan and Barbudan English

- Spoken in: Antigua and Barbuda

Aostan French – français valdôtain

- Spoken in: Aosta Valley, Italy

Appalachian English – Appalachian English

- Spoken in: Appalachia, the United States

Armenian (Eastern) – Արևելահայերեն

- Spoken in: Armenia

Armenian (Western) – Արեւմտահայերէն

- Spoken by: the Armenian Diaspora

Australian English – Australian English

- Spoken in: Australia

Auvergnat – auvernhat

- Spoken in: Auvergne, France

=== B ===
Bagirmi Fulfulde – ?

- Spoken in: Chad

Bahamian English – Bahamian English

- Spoken in: Bahamas

Balearic Catalan – balear

- Spoken in: the Balearic Islands, Spain

Balochi (Eastern) – رۏدرآتکی بلۏچی

- Spoken in: Pakistani, Punjab and the northeastern area of Balochistan

Balochi (Southern) – مکرانی

- Spoken in: Pakistan and Iran

Balochi (Western) – رخشانی

- Spoken in: Pakistan, Iran, Afghanistan and Turkmenistan

Banat Bulgarian – Banátsća balgarsćija jazić, Palćena balgarsćija jazić

- Spoken in: Banat, Romania, Serbia

Banyumasan – basa Banyumasan

- Spoken in: Western Central Java, Indonesia

Bavarian (Central) – Mittelbairisch

- Spoken in: Germany, Salzburg, Styria, Burgenland)

Bavarian (Northern) – Nordboarisch

- Spoken in: Upper Palatinate, Upper Franconia, Upper Bavaria, and Lower Bavaria in Germany

Bavarian (Southern) – Südbairisch

- Spoken in: Austria, Carinthia, Upper Styria, and Canada

Belarusian (Taraškievica) – тарашкевіца

- Spoken by: the Belarusian diaspora

Belgian French – français de Belgique

- Spoken in: Wallonia, Belgium

Belizean English – Belizean English

- Spoken in: Belize

Berlin German – Berliner Dialekt, Berliner Mundart, Berlinerisch, Berlinisch

- Spoken in: Berlin, Germany

Bermudian English – Bermudian English

- Spoken in: Bermuda

Black American Sign Language – Black American Sign Language, Black Sign Variation

- Signed by: African Americans

Borgu Fulfulde – Fulfulde, ڢُلْڢُلْدٜ

- Spoken in: Benin

Bornholmsk – bornholmsk

- Spoken in: Bornholm, Denmark

Brabantian Dutch – Braobans

- Spoken in: Belgium and the Netherlands

Brazilian German – Brazildeutsch

- Recognised Minority Language in: Brazil

Brazilian Portuguese – português brasileiro

- Spoken in: Brazil

British English – British English

- Spoken in: United Kingdom

Broccolino – broccolino, italoamericano

- Spoken in: Brooklyn, New York City, New York, United States

Bungi – Bungee, Bungie, Bungay, Bangay, the Red River Dialect

- Spoken in: Manitoba, Canada

Bunjevac – bunjevački

- Spoken in: Bosnia and Herzegovina, Croatia, Hungary, and Vojvodina, Serbia

Burgenland Croatian – gradišćanskohrvatski jezik

- Recognised Minority Language in: Austria and Hungary

=== C ===
Cameroonian English – Cameroon English

- Spoken in: Cameroon

Cameroonian French – français camerounais

- Spoken in: Cameroon

Canadian English – Canadian English

- Spoken in: Canada

Canadian French – Français canadien

- Spoken in: Canada

Canarian Spanish – español de Canarias, español canario, habla canaria, dialecto canario

- Spoken in: Canary Islands, Spain

Caribbean Spanish – español caribeño

- Spoken in: Cuba, Dominican Republic, Puerto Rico, and Panama

Cayman Islands English – Caymanian English

- Spoken in: Cayman Islands

Central American Spanish – español centroamericano

- Spoken in: Costa Rica, El Salvador, Guatemala, Honduras, Belize and Nicaragua

Central Kanuri – Yerwá Kànùrí

- Spoken in: Cameroon, Chad, Niger, and Nigeria

Central-Eastern Niger Fulfulde – Fulfulde

- Spoken in: Central and eastern Niger

Chakavian – čakavski

- Spoken in: Croatia and Slovenia

Chicano English – Chicano English, Mexican-American English

- Spoken by: Mexican Americans in the Southwestern United States

Chilean Spanish – español chileno

- Spoken in: Chile

Colognian – Kölsch

- Spoken in: Cologne, Germany

Colonia Tovar – Alemán Coloniero

- Spoken in: Colonia Tovar, Aragua, Venezuela

Congo Swahili – Kingwana

- Spoken in: the Democratic Republic of the Congo

Coptic (Bohairic) – ϯⲁⲥⲡⲓ ⲛ̄ⲣⲉⲙⲛ̄ⲭⲏⲙⲓ ⲛ̄ⲣⲉⲙϧⲏⲧ, ϯⲁⲥⲡⲓ ⲛ̄ⲣⲉⲙϧⲏⲧ, ϯⲁⲥⲡⲓ ⲛ̄ⲣⲉⲙⲡⲉⲙϩⲏⲧ

- Formerly spoken in: Egypt
- The Bohairic Coptic language is a liturgical language used by the Coptic Orthodox Church

Coptic (Sahidic) – ϯⲁⲥⲡⲓ ⲛⲣⲉⲙⲣⲏⲥ

- Spoken by: Copts in upper Egypt

Cornish English – Cornish English, Anglo-Cornish, Cornu-English

- Spoken in: Cornwall, England, the United Kingdom

Cree (East) – ᐄᔨᔫ ᐊᔨᒨᓐ, ᐄᓅ ᐊᔨᒨᓐ

- Spoken in: Quebec, Canada

Cree (Moose) – ᐃᓕᓖᒧᐎᓐ

- Spoken in: Ontario, Canada

Cree (Northern East) – Iyiyiw-Ayimiwin, ᐄᔨᔫ ᐊᔨᒧᐎᓐ

- Spoken in: Quebec, Canada

Cree (Plains) – ᓀᐦᐃᔭᐍᐏᐣ

- Official language in: the Northwest Territories, Canada
- Also spoken in: Manitoba, Saskatchewan, Canada, the United States

Cree (Southern East) – Īnū Ayimūn, ᐄᓅ ᐊᔨᒧᐎᓐ

- Spoken in: Quebec, Canada

Cree (Swampy) – ᓀᐦᐃᓇᐍᐏᐣ

- Spoken in: Ontario, Canada

Cree (Woods) – ᓀᐦᐃᖬᐍᐏᐣ

- Spoken in: Manitoba, Canada

Cypriot Greek – κυπριακή ελληνική, κυπριακά

- Spoken in: Cyprus

Cypriot Turkish – Kıbrıs Türkçesi

- Spoken in: Cyprus and Northern Cyprus

=== D ===
Danzig German – Danziger Deutsch

- Formerly spoken in Gdańsk, Poland; currently in Germany

Dari – دری

- Official language in: Afghanistan

Dimli – Dimli

- Spoken in: Turkish provinces of Adıyaman, Aksaray, Batman, Bingöl, Bitlis, Diyarbakır, Elazığ, Malatya, Muş, and Şanlıurfa

Dorset English – Dorset English

- Spoken in: Dorset, England, the United Kingdom

Dutch Low Saxon (collective name for multiple dialects) – Nederlaands Leegsaksies, Nederlaands Nedersaksies

- Spoken in: Northeastern Netherlands

=== E ===
East Franconian – Fränggisch, Mainfränkisch, Ostfränkisch

- Spoken in: Franconia, Germany

East Frisian Low Saxon – Oostfräisk, Oostfreesk, Plattdüts

- Spoken in: East Frisia, Germany

Eastphalian – ostfälsch Platt

- Spoken in: Lower Saxony, Germany

Elfdalian – övdalsk, övdalską

- Spoken in: Älvdalen Municipality, Dalarna County, Sweden

Emirati Arabic – اللهجة الإماراتية

- Spoken in: the United Arab Emirates

Equatorial Guinean Spanish – Español de Guinea Equatorial

- Spoken in: Equatorial Guinea

Estonian Swedish – estlandssvenska

- Spoken in: Estonia

Estuary English – Estuary English

- Spoken in: Greater London, the United Kingdom

=== F ===
Farsi – فارسی

- Official language in: Iran

Finland Swedish – finlandssvenska

- Spoken in: Finland

Florentine – dialetto fiorentino

- Spoken in: Florence, Tuscany, Italy

Fuzhou – 平話 or 福州話

- Spoken in: Fujian, China

=== G ===
Gascon – gascon

- Spoken in: Gascony, France

Genoese – zeneise or zeneize

- Spoken in: Liguria, Italy

Goral – górolsko gwara, góralsko gwara

- Recognised Minority Language in: Slovakia
- Also spoken in: Lesser Poland Voivodeship, Poland

Greek (Demotic) – ελληνικά, δημοτική

- Spoken by: Greeks

Greek (Katharevousa) – ἑλληνικά, καθαρεύουσα

- Formerly spoken by: Greeks
- Katharevousa is still used by Greek Orthodox Church

Gronings – Grunnegs, Grönnegs

- Spoken in: Groningen, northeastern Drenthe, the Netherlands

=== H ===
Hazāragī – هزارگی

- Spoken in: Afghanistan, Iran, and Pakistan

Heligolandic – Halunder

- Spoken in: Heligoland, Germany

Hessian – Hessisch

- Spoken in: Hesse, Germany

Hiberno-English – Hiberno-English, Irish English, Anglo-Irish

- Spoken in: the Republic of Ireland and Northern Ireland

Hindko – ہندکو

- Spoken in: the Pakistani province of Khyber Pakhtunkhwa

Hokkien – 福佬話

- Spoken in: the southern area of the Chinese province of Fujian, Taiwan, and in Southeast Asia

Hong Kong English – Honglish

- Spoken in: Hong Kong, China

=== I ===
Ibinda – Kibinda, Chibinda, Tchibinda, Cibinda

- Spoken in: Cabinda, Angola

Inuttitut – Nunatsiavummiutitut, ᓄᓇᑦᓯᐊᕗᒻᒥᐅᑐᑦ

- Spoken in: Nunatsiavut, Labrador, Canada

=== J ===
Jamaican English – Jamaican English

- Spoken in: Jamaica

Jersey Dutch † – Laag Duits

- Formerly spoken in: New Netherland, United States)

=== K ===
Kaaps – Kaaps

- Spoken in: Western Cape, South Africa

Kajkavian – kajkavščina, kajkavština, kajkavica

- Spoken in: Croatia

Kirmanjki – Kirmanjki

- Spoken in: Turkish provinces of Bayburt, Bingöl, Erzincan, Erzurum, Gümüşhane, Muş, Sivas, and Tunceli

Koisan – Tjwao

- Official language in: Zimbabwe

Koryo-mar – 고려말, Корё мар

- Spoken in: Uzbekistan, Russia, Kazakhstan, Ukraine, Kyrgyzstan

Kursenieki – kursineeki wahloda

- Spoken in: Curonian Spit (historically), Germany (currently)

Kven – kvääni, kainu

- Recognised Minority Language in: Norway

Kwanyama – Oshikwanyama

- Spoken in: Angola and Namibia

=== L ===
Languedocien – lengadocian

- Spoken in: Southern France

Limonese Creole – Mekatelyu

- Spoken in: Limón, Costa Rica

Limousin – lemosin

- Spoken in: Limousin, France

Llanito – Llanito

- Spoken in: Gibraltar, United Kingdom

Lorraine Franconian – Lottrìnger Plàtt

- Spoken in: Lorraine, France

Louisiana French – français louisianais

- Spoken in: Louisiana, United States

Low Prussian – Niederpreußisch

- Formerly spoken in: Prussia, now some scattered speakers in the Americas

Low Saxon (collective name for multiple dialects) – Nedersaksies

- Spoken in: Denmark, Germany, and the Netherlands

Lower Silesian – Schläsisch, Schläs’sch, Schlä’sch, Schläsch

- Spoken in: Germany, Poland, and Czech Republic

=== M ===
Maasina Fulfulde – Fulfulde, Maasinankoore

- Spoken in: Mali

Malaysian Malay – Bahasa Melayu Baku, بهاس ملايو ڤياواي, Bahasa Melayu Malaysia, بهاس ملايو مليسيا, Bahasa Malaysia, بهاس مليسيا

- Official language in: Malaysia, Singapore, and Brunei

Malvani – मालवणी

- Spoken in: Maharashtra and Goa, India

Manx English – Manx English, Anglo-Manx

- Spoken in: Isle of Man

Maore Comorian – Shimaore, شِمَوُوْرِيْ

- Spoken in: Mayotte, France

Masurian – mazurská gádkä

- Spoken in: Masuria, Poland

Meänkieli – Meänkieli

- Recognised Minority Language in: Sweden

Métis French – français métis

- Spoken in: Saskatchewan, Alberta, and Manitoba, Canada

Mexican Spanish – español mexicano

- Spoken in: Mexico

Monégasque – Munegascu

- Spoken in: Monaco

Moravian – moravská nářečí

- Spoken in: Moravia, the Czech Republic

Murcian Spanish – murciano

- Spoken in: Murcia, Spain

Mwali Comorian – Shimwali

- Spoken in: Mohéli, Comoros

=== N ===
Na – Bangni

- Spoken in: Upper Subansiri district in Arunachal Pradesh, India

Namibian German – Südwesterdeutsch, Namdeutsch, Namsläng

- Spoken in: Namibia

Ndonga – Oshindonga

- Spoken in: Angola and Namibia

New Caledonian French – français néo-calédonien

- Spoken in: New Caledonia, France

New Mexican Spanish – español neomexicano

- Spoken in: New Mexico, the United States

New Zealand English – New Zealand English

- Spoken in: New Zealand

Newfoundland English – Newfoundland English

- Spoken in: Newfoundland and Labrador, Canada

Nigerian Fulfulde – Fulfulde, ڢُلْڢُلْدٜ

- Spoken in: Nigeria

Ningbo – 寧波閒話

- Spoken in: the Chinese sub-provincial division of Ningbo

Ngazija Comorian – Shingazija

- Spoken in: Grande Comore, Comoros

Norwegian (Bokmål) – bokmål

- Spoken in: Norway

Norwegian (Høgnorsk) – høgnorsk

- Spoken in: Norway

Norwegian (Nynorsk) – nynorsk

- Spoken in: Norway

Norwegian (Riksmål) – riksmål

- Spoken in: Norway

Nunavimmiutitut – ᓄᓇᕕᒻᒥᐅᑎᑐᑦ

- Spoken in: Nunavik, Quebec, Canada

Nzwani Comorian – Shinzwani

- Spoken in: Anjouan, Comoros

=== O ===
Ojibwe (Central) – Ojibwemowin

- Spoken in: Ontario, Canada

Ojibwe (Eastern) – Jibwemwin

- Spoken in: Ontario, Canada

Ojibwe (Northwestern) – Ojibwemowin

- Spoken in: Ontario, Canada

Ojibwe (Western) – Nakawēmowin

- Spoken in: Manitoba, Canada

Okinawan Japanese – ウチナーヤマトゥグチ

- Recognised Regional Language in: Japan

Orcadian – Orcadian, Orcadian Scots

- Spoken in: Orkney, the United Kingdom

Ossetian (Digor) – дигорон ӕвзаг

- Official language in: North Ossetia, Russia

Ossetian (Iron) – Ирон ӕвзаг

- Official language in: South Ossetia

Ottawa – Nishnaabemwin, Daawaamwin

- Spoken in: Ontario, Michigan and Oklahoma in the United States

=== P ===
Pahari-Pothwari – پہاڑی پوٹھواری

- Spoken in: the Pakistani state of Azad Kashmir

Palatine German – Pälzisch

- Spoken in: Palatinate, Germany

Paraguayan Spanish – español paraguayo

- Spoken in: Paraguay

Patagonian Welsh – Cymraeg y Wladfa

- Recognised Minority Language in: Y Wladfa, Chubut, Argentina

Peripheral Mongolian – ᠮᠣᠩᠭᠣᠯ ᠬᠡᠯᠡ

- Official language in: the Chinese autonomous region of Inner Mongolia

Podlachian – pudlaśka mova

- Spoken in: Podlaskie Voivodeship, Poland

Prekmurje Slovene – prekmürščina, prekmörščina, panonska slovenščina, prekmurščina, prekmursko narečje

- Spoken in: Slovenia and Hungary

Provençal – prouvençau

- Spoken in: Provence, France, Italy

Pulaar – Pulaar

- Spoken in: Senegal, the Gambia, Guinea-Bissau, Mali and Mauritania

Pular – Pular

- Spoken in: Guinea, Guinea-Bissau and Mali

Punjabi (Eastern) – पंजाबी, ਪੰਜਾਬੀ

- Official language in: the Indian Union territory of Delhi; and the Indian states of Haryana, Himachal Pradesh, Punjab, and West Bengal

Punjabi (Western) – پنجابی

- Majority spoken language in: Pakistan and mostly in the province of Punjab

=== Q ===
Quanzhou – 泉州話

- Spoken in: the southern area of the Chinese province of Fujian

Quebec French – français québécois

- Spoken in: Quebec, Canada

=== R ===
Resian – Rozajanski langäč, Rozojanski langäč

- Recognised Minority Language in: Italy

Rioplatense Spanish – Castellano rioplatense

- Spoken in: Argentina, Uruguay

=== S ===
Saint Pierre and Miquelon French – français saint-pierrais

- Spoken in: Saint Pierre and Miquelon, France

Sammarinese – sammarinese

- Spoken in: San Marino

Sapudi – Bhâsa Sapudi

- Spoken in: Sapudi Island, Indonesia

Saraiki – سرائیکی, ਸਰਾਇਕੀ, सराइकी

- Spoken in: the central regions of Pakistan

Sardinian (Campidanese) – sardu campidanesu, campidanesu

- Spoken in: southern Sardinia, Italy

Sardinian (Logudorese) – sardu logudoresu, logudoresu

- Spoken in: central Sardinia, Italy

Savoyard – savoyârd

- Spoken in: Savoy, France

Scanian – skånska

- Spoken in: Scania, Sweden

Scottish English – Scottish English

- Spoken in: Scotland, the United Kingdom

Seroa † – ǃGãǃne, ǁKuǁe

- Formerly spoken in: Lesotho and South Africa

Shtokavian – štokavski, штокавски

- Spoken in: Serbia, Croatia, Bosnia and Herzegovina, Montenegro, and Kosovo

Singpho – Singhpaw ga

- Spoken in: Arunachal Pradesh and Assam, India

Slavey (North) – Sahtúgot’įné Yatı̨́, K’ashógot’įne Goxedǝ́ or Shíhgot’įne Yatı̨́

- Official language in: the Northwest Territories, Canada

Slavey (South) – Dené Dháh, Dene Yatıé or Dene Zhatıé

- Official language in: the Northwest Territories, Canada

Slavomolisano – na-našu, na-našo

- Recognised Minority Language in: Italy

Slavonic-Serbian † – Славено-сербскiй

- Formerly used as a literary language in: Vojvodina, Serbia

South African English – South African English

- Spoken in: South Africa

Stellingwarfs – Stellingwerfs

- Spoken in: Ooststellingwerf, the Netherlands

Surinamese Dutch – Surinaams-Nederlands

- Spoken in: Suriname

Swabian – Schwäbisch

- Spoken in: Swabia, Germany

Swiss French – français de Suisse, suisse romand

- Spoken in: Romandy, Switzerland

Swiss German – Schwiizerdütsch

- Spoken in: German-speaking areas of Switzerland

Swiss Italian – italiano svizzero

- Spoken in: Ticino and the Italian Grisons, Switzerland

=== T ===
Taishanese – 台山话, 臺山話

- Spoken in: China and the overseas communities, particularly in United States and Canada

Tarantino – tarandíne

- Spoken in: Apulia, Italy

Tavoyan – ထားဝယ်စကား

- Spoken in: Tanintharyi Region, Myanmar

Teochew – 潮州話

- Spoken by: the Chinese Teochew people

Texan English – Texan English

- Spoken in: Texas, the United States

Texas German – Texasdeutsch

- Spoken in: Texas, the United States

Thuringian – Thüringisch

- Spoken in: Thuringia, Germany

Torlakian – Торлачки, Torlački

- Spoken in: Serbia, Bulgaria, North Macedonia, Kosovo, and Romania

Triestine – triestin

- Spoken in: Trieste, Italy

Trinidadian and Tobagonian English – Trinidadian and Tobagonian English

- Spoken in: Trinidad and Tobago

Tuscan – toscano, vernacolo

- Spoken in: Tuscany, Italy

=== U ===
Upper Saxon – Obersächsisch

- Spoken in: Saxony, Germany

=== V ===
Valdôtain – valdotèn

- Spoken in: Aosta Valley, Italy

Varhadi – वऱ्हाडी, 𑘪𑘬𑘿𑘮𑘰𑘚𑘲

- Spoken in: Maharashtra, India

=== W ===
Walser – Wälserisch

- Spoken in: Valais in Switzerland; Piedmont in Italy; also Austria and Liechtenstein

Welsh English – Wenglish, Welsh English

- Spoken in: Wales, the United Kingdom

West Flemish – West-Vlaams

- Spoken in: Flanders, Belgium, France, the Netherlands

West Polesian – захыднёполіськая мова

- Spoken in: Southwestern Belarus, Northwestern Ukraine and in bordering regions of Poland

Western Niger Fulfulde – Fulfulde, ڢُلْڢُلْدٜ

- Spoken in: Western Niger

Westphalian – Westfäölsk

- Spoken in: Westphalia, Germany

=== Y ===
Yukjin – 육진말

- Spoken in: North Korea and in bordering regions of China

=== Z ===
Zimbabwean English – Zimbabwean English

- Spoken in: Zimbabwe

=== ǂ ===
ǂAkhoe – ǂAkhoe Haiǁom

- Spoken in: Angola, Botswana, Namibia, and South Africa

== See also ==
- Language
- Lists of extinct languages
- Lists of languages
- Official languages of the UN (United Nations)
