= Horas =

Word in the Batak languages

Batak Languages Distribution, Red is Ales-Kluet, Orange is Karo, Yellow is Pakpak, Green is Simalungun, Blue is Toba, Purple is Angkola, Brown is Mandailing

Horas (Toba Batak: ᯂᯬᯒᯘ᯲) is the Batak word to express gratefulness, happiness, and healthiness, however it is more commonly used as a simple greeting and goodbye. It is the equivalent to "hello" or "goodbye". This word can be found in every Batak languages, with a few exceptions being; Batak Dairi and Batak Karo. The Batak Karo and the Dairi Batak has their own greetings which is mejuah-juah or njuah-juah.

== In pop culture ==
In pop culture, the word horas may be found in songs, such as:

- Sai Horas Ma Ho Tu Si Boru Lomomi, a Batak song composed by Hendro Sinambela
- Anak Medan, a Batak song composed by Freddy Tambunan
