= Singkil people =

Ethnic group in Aceh, Indonesia

Singkil
Ukhang Singkil
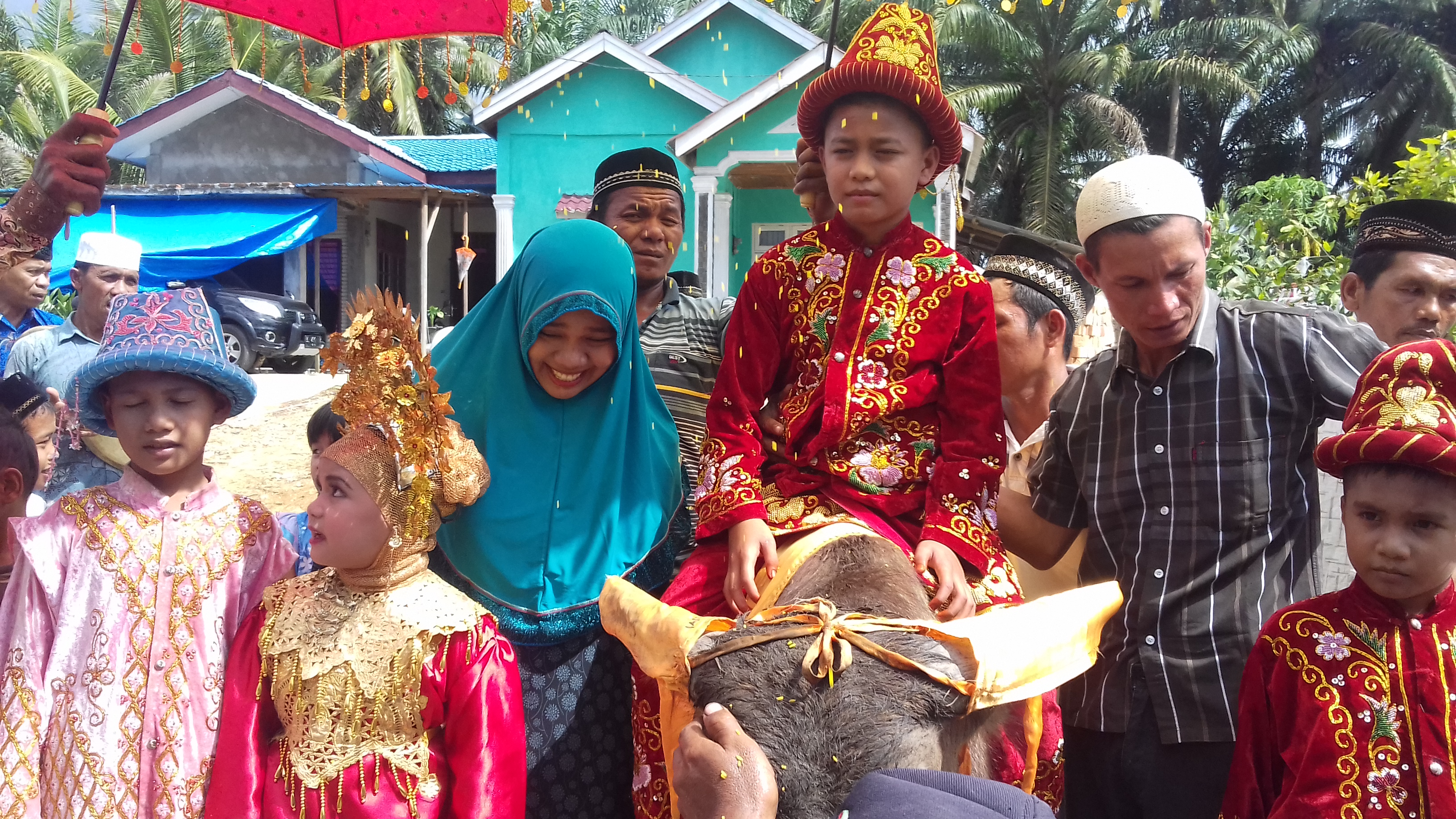
- The Singkil circumcision ceremony.

Total population
- 75,000

Regions with significant populations
- Indonesia (Aceh)

Languages
- Singkil, Indonesian

Religion
- Islam

Related ethnic groups
- Pakpak, Karo, Gayo, Minangkabau, Acehnese

The Singkil people are a sub-group of the Batak people found in Aceh Singkil Regency and Subulussalam, as well as in the Trumon districts of neighbouring South Aceh Regency, all part of the province of Aceh, Indonesia. Sometimes the Singkil people are misunderstood as being Boang people, a sub-group of the Pakpak people, especially because of their shared religion of Islam and because they live side by side.

Their closest linguistic relationship is with the Pakpak people, but the customs and culture of the Singkil people are very different from those of the Pakpak people. This is because majority of the Singkil people practices Islam, whereas the majority of the Pakpak people practices Christianity. Apart from that the Singkil people have intermarried with the neighbouring ethnic group of people like Acehnese people and Minangkabau people.

== Language ==
The Singkil language is one of the Northern Batak languages widely spoken in Aceh Singkil Regency, Subulussalam City, and part of Southeast Aceh Regency, all within the province of Aceh, Indonesia. The Singkil language is very similar to the Pakpak language of neighbouring the province of North Sumatra. However, the Singkil language has its own uniqueness whereby the alphabet ⟨r⟩ is pronounced as ⟨kh⟩. For example, the word 'appearance' in Indonesian language is rupa, while in the Singkil language it is khupa.

== Culture ==
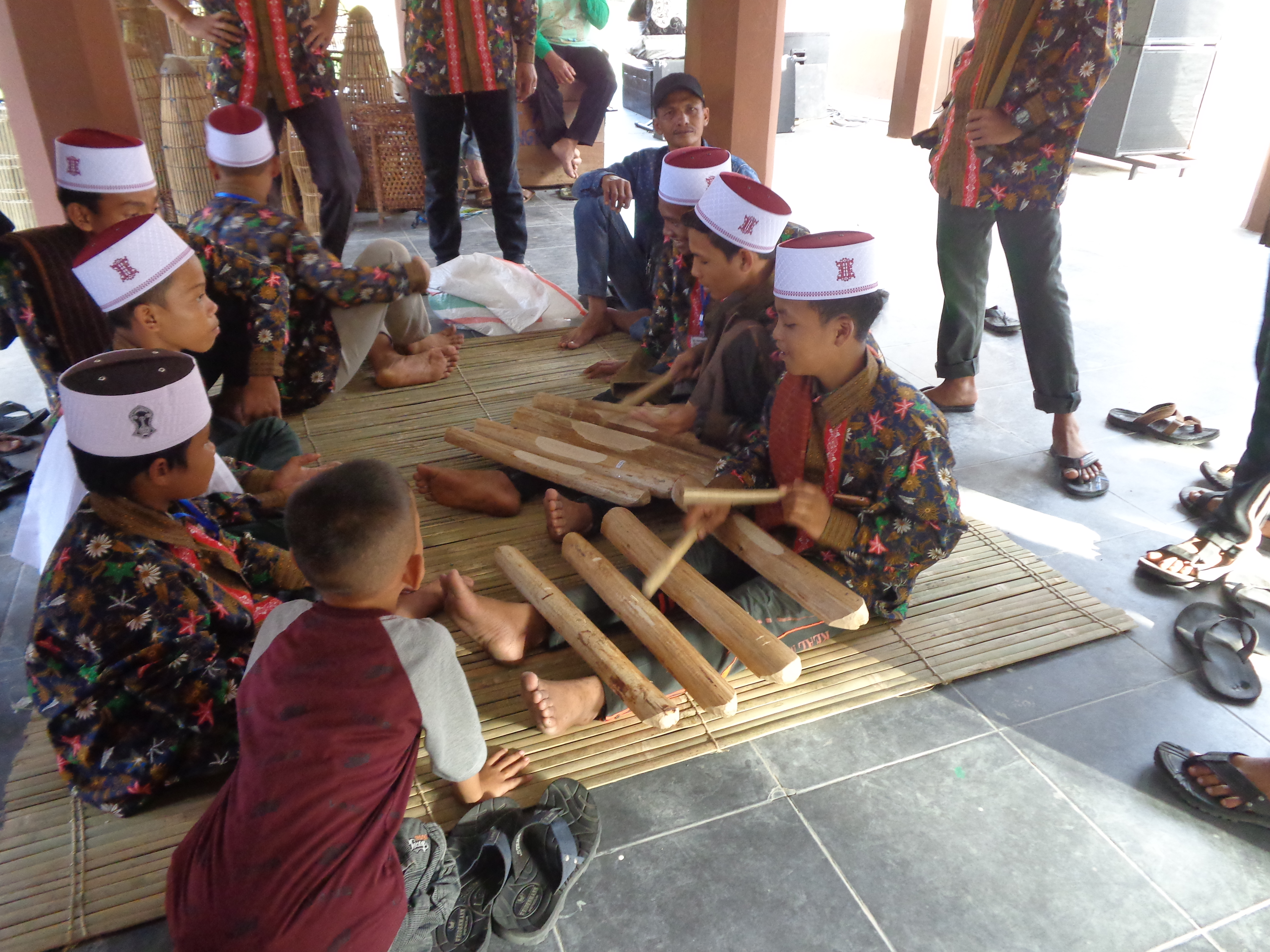
Dendang canang, musical performance from Singkil

The culture of the Singkil people itself has been greatly influenced by Islamic traditions. Although they may belong to the same clusters of parent-ethnic, the culture of the Pakpak people is vastly different from the Singkil people. This is because the Singkil people are mostly Muslims, while majority of the Pakpak people are Christians. Apart from that, mix marriages among the Singkil people with other foreign ethnics such as Acehnese people and Minangkabau people occurs more frequently.

== Religion ==
Islam is believed to have spread in lands of the Singkil people a few centuries ago by foreign merchants that came from Minangkabau Highlands and later during the rule of the Aceh Sultanate. Many of the Minangkabau people have left traces of their history and their descendants in the coastline region. Abdurrauf Singkil, also known as Syekh Abdur Rauf as-Singkili was once a famous Singkil ulama that was appointed as a head ulama and a mufti in the Acehnese kingdom in 17th century.

== Surnames ==
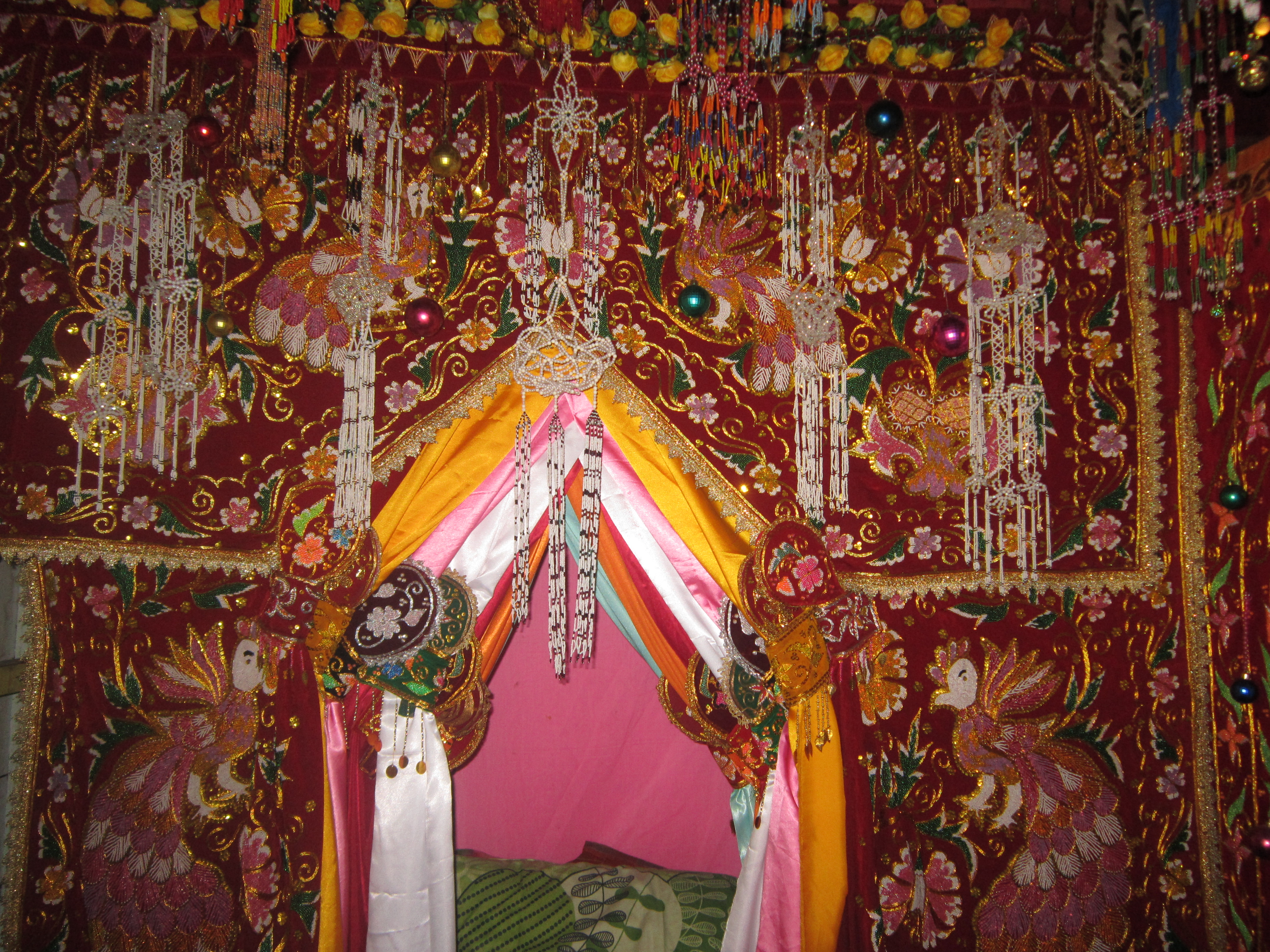
Traditional Singkil wedding stage

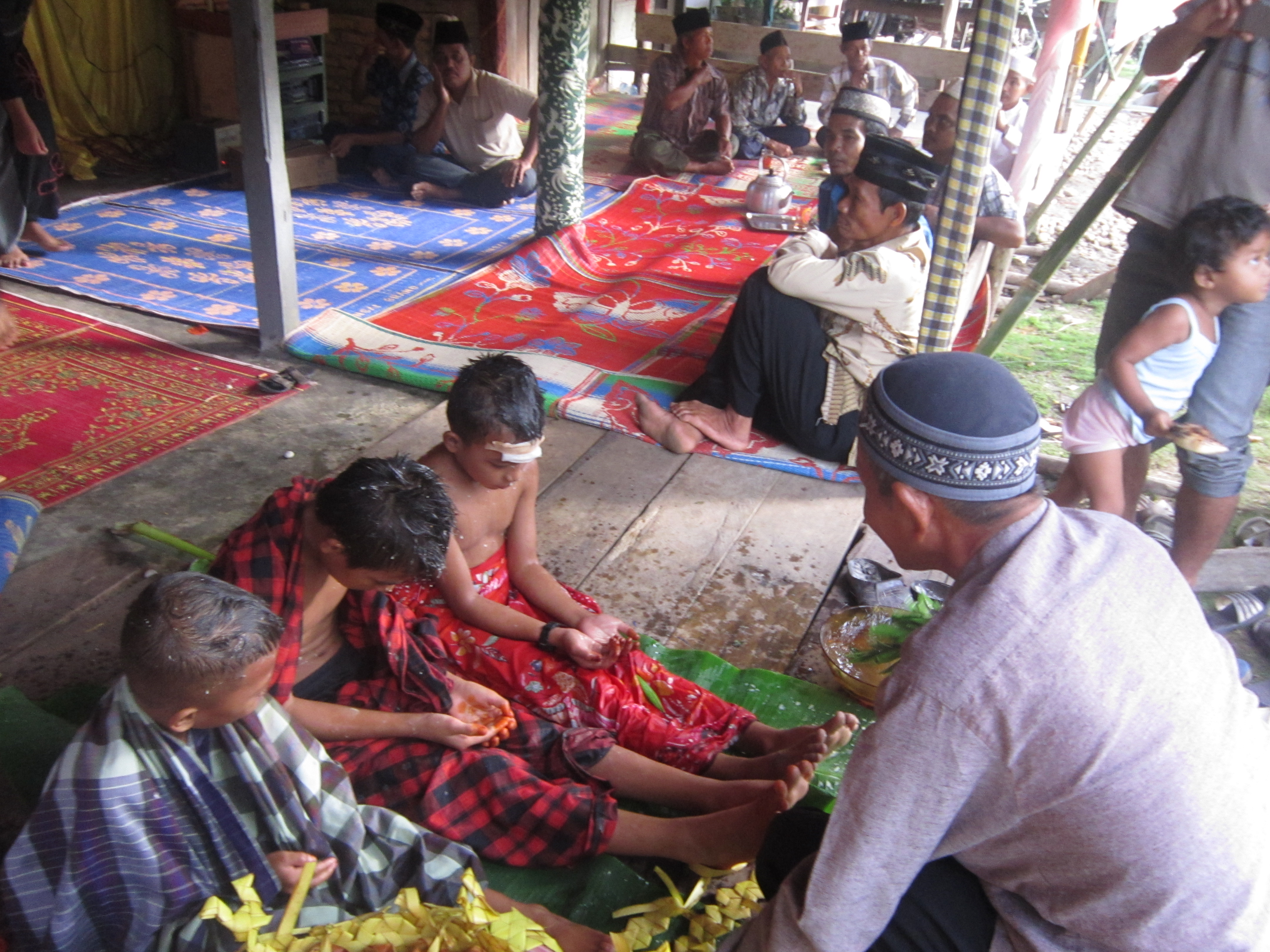
Mandi pangir, bathing during children circumcision procession

Just as with other sub-ethnic Batak people, the marga (family name or surname) of the Singkil people derives from the patrilineal lineage. Generally, the margas that are used by the Singkil people are similar to those used by the Pakpak people, Alas people, Kluet people and part of Karo people along with Toba people. Nevertheless, there are margas that are different. Several of the margas that are found among the Singkil people includes:

- Kombih (Kumbi)
- Ramin
- Barat
- Palis (Pelis)
- Manik
- Kembang
- Kesugihen
- Lingga
- Bako
- Ujung
- Sulin (Solin)
- Pokan (Pohan)

There are also a number of Singkil margas that originates from the descendants of the Minangkabau people that have assimilated with the Singkil people centuries ago, such as:

- Melayu (Malau)
- Goci
