= Batak Muslims =

Bataks who adhere to Islam

Batak Muslims or Islamized Bataks (Note: also spelt as "Islamised Bataks" in British English) (Toba Batak: ᯅᯖ᯲ᯖ ᯘᯪᯞᯬᯔ᯲, Batta Silom) refers to the Batak (native of central and northern regions of the Indonesian island of Sumatra) who embraced Islam as their religion. Historically, the Batak people practiced animism, with a strong emphasis on ancestral worship and other traditional beliefs. The transition to Islam among the Batak occurred gradually, with the early historical record started since at least 8th or 9th century, (Note: referred to historical ties of Batak and Peureulak) as a result of trade relations, missionary activities, and the influence of nearby Islamic-based monarchs in pre-colonial Indonesia.

== Demographics ==
The majority of Batak Muslims belong to the Coastal Batak groups, such as the Alas–Kluet (Aceh-influenced Bataks), Angkola, Dairi–Pakpak, Mandailing and Simalungun Bataks.

== Impacts ==
- Genealogical

The Minangkabau distinguish themselves from the Batak by adopting a matrilineal clan system, contrasting with the common Batak's patrilineal system. However, it is noteworthy that matrilineal-based clans in Batak society have also been historically recognized, albeit in limited contexts. These matrilineal structures were primarily associated with practices of inter-cousin marriage, which were relatively uncommon among the Batak. The emergence of cousin marriages within Batak society is believed to have coincided with the arrival and cultural influence of Arab traders and settlers in Sumatra. Given that Islam permits marriage between cousins, it is speculated that this practice may have influenced the Minangkabaus who later adopted the Batak matrilineal-based clan system approach.

== See also ==
- Dayak Muslims
- Arab Muslims
