= Sara Gilfert =

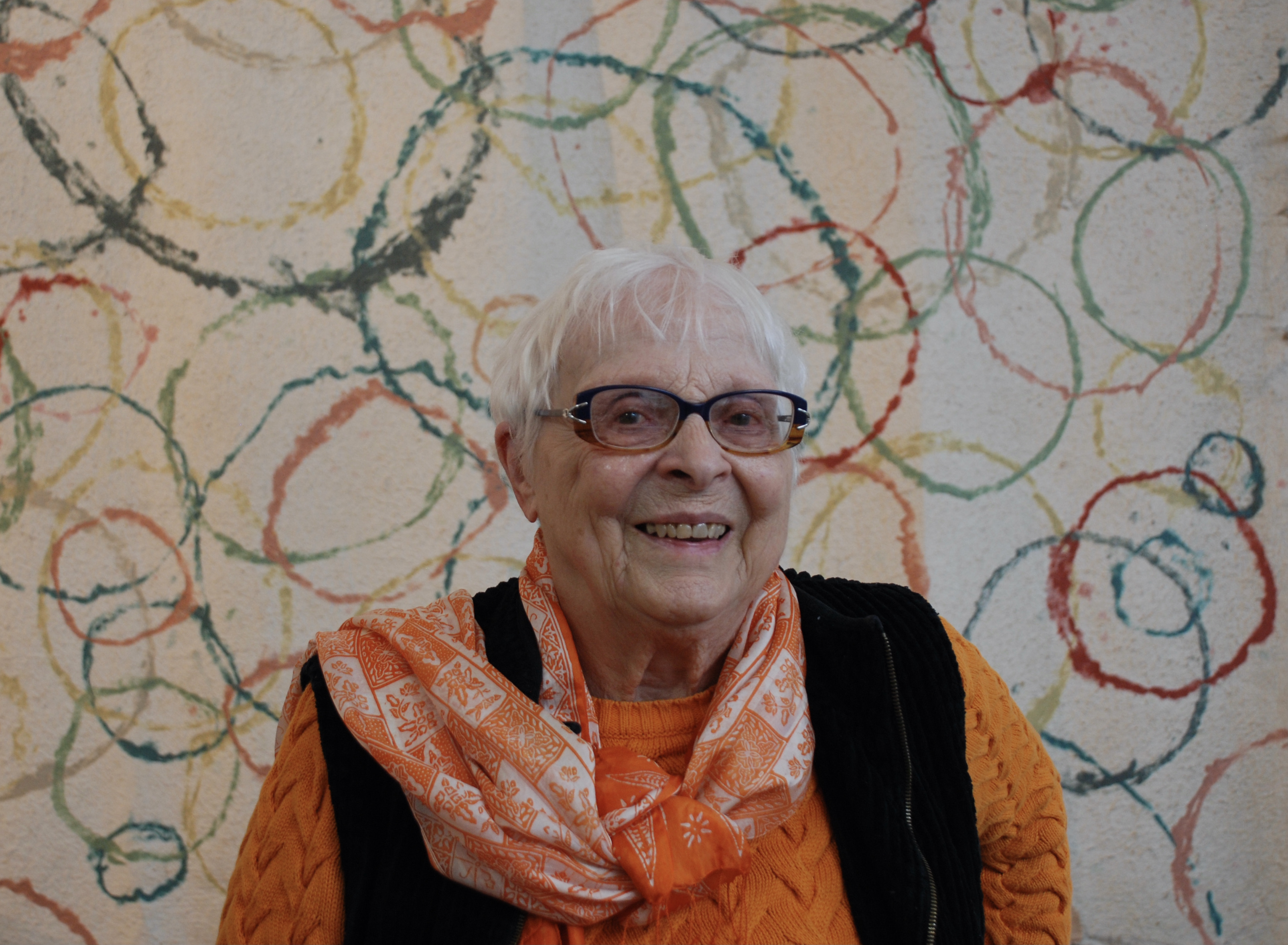
- Born: 1 June 1929; Tarkio
- Died: 15 March 2024
- Employers: Ohio University (1980–1985); University of Rio Grande
- Spouse: James Gilfert

Sara "Sally" McCalmont Gilfert (June 1, 1929 – March 15, 2024) was an American hand papermaker and textile artist.

== Early life ==
Gilfert was born in Tarkio, Missouri, but spent most of her early life in Janesville, Wisconsin. She graduated from Janesville High School, then moved to Yellow Springs, Ohio to attend Antioch College.

At Antioch she met her future husband, James Gilfert, and they married at the Antioch College chapel in 1949. After James graduated, they moved to Columbus and continued their studies at Ohio State University. James studied physics and Sara studied home economics. In 1967, they moved to Athens, Ohio, where James taught electrical engineering at Ohio University.

== Art career ==
In the 1970s, Gilfert wanted to continue her studies. Her home economics credits were only transferable for the School of Art at Ohio University. She worked with textile art and weaving, and submitted her Master of Fine Art exhibition in 1979. From 1980 to 1985, she taught at Ohio University in the Textile Department until it closed.

In the early 1980s, she started a women's collective of textile artists known as the Athens Tapestry Works. The group created commissioned works for businesses such as bank lobbies. Gilfert was also involved in the early Quilt National exhibitions at the Dairy Barn Arts Center. In 1981, she coordinated the show.

Gilfert discovered papermaking in 1979 and found her true artistic passion. In 1983, she travelled to Japan for a three-month apprenticeship focused on traditional hand papermaking techniques. In the village of Obara she learned a technique invented by Ando Kazuhiza, from Ando himself. When she returned to Athens, she began building papermaking equipment and started producing her own paper-based artwork. One way she made paper was from harvesting the white fiber from the inner bark of the mulberry tree.

In the early 1980s, Gilfert also taught natural dyeing, spinning, and weaving classes at Ohio University, including at satellite campuses in Lancaster and Chillicothe, and at the University of Rio Grande.

== Paper Circle ==
To share her knowledge and love of papermaking, Gilfert founded the store and studio Paper Circle in Nelsonville, Ohio in 2003. This was a nonprofit organization that was dedicated to the celebration, advancement, and preservation of paper and book arts. Paper Circle became not just a place to work and sell products, but a community gathering place where artists could exhibit and teach. Each summer for 15 years, Paper Circle ran a summer art program for children called the Circle Round the Square.

The store closed after 22 years, soon after Gilfert's death in 2024.

== Awards and memberships ==
For her work in southeastern Ohio, Gilfert received a Jenco Award (2023) posthumously. This award "celebrates unsung heroes who, outside of their paid positions, give their time, talent and passion in ways that contribute to quality of life in Appalachian Ohio."

Gilfert was an active member of the Friends of Dard Hunter, now the North American Hand Papermaker's Association. She was awarded Papermaking Champion from the North American Hand Papermakers in 2023.

== Exhibits ==
- "Myth, Magic and Meditations," Robert C. Williams Museum of Papermaking in Atlanta, GA, in 1999
