= Kluet people =

Ethnic group of Indonesia

Kluet Keluwat
Kak Keluwat

Total population
- 58,000

Regions with significant populations
- Indonesia (Aceh)

Languages
- Alas-Kluet language, Indonesian

Religion
- Islam

Related ethnic groups
- Alas, Singkil, Pakpak

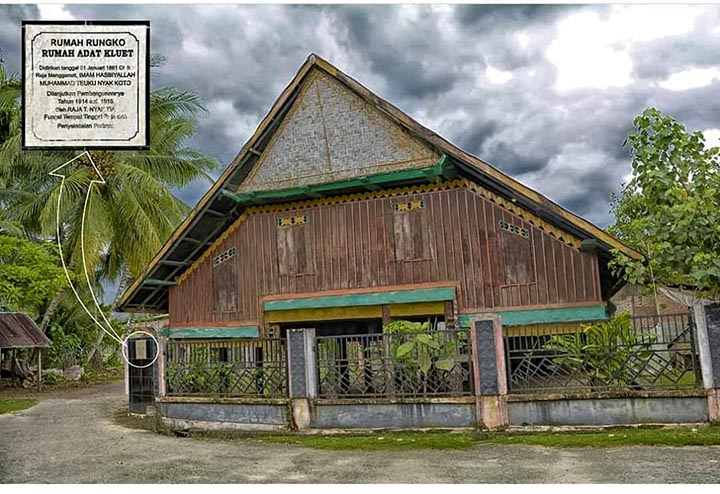
Kluet traditional house

Kluet or Keluwat people are Bataks sub-ethnic in South Aceh Regency, Aceh, Indonesia namely North Kluet, South Kluet, Central Kluet, and East Kluet. The Kluet people are regarded as part of the Batak people sub-ethnicity. The Kluet regions are separated by Lawé Kluet River, where it disgorges from the Mount Leuser and disembogues into the Indian Ocean. Residential region of the Kluet people is 30 km from Tapaktuan city or 500 km from Banda Aceh. Majority of the population and as well as the Kluet people practice Islam.

== History ==
During the colonial period, the Acehnese people are known to have had political influence on the coastal area that became known as Kluet kingdom. Therefore, the Acehnese people also had cultural influence in the culture of the Kluet people to a certain degree, where the adat (customary) authority structure of the Kluet people are historically similar. Farming is the main source of income for the Kluet people.

== Culture ==
Just like any other Batak people, the Kluet people have marga (surnames or family names) of their own that are still being used today namely Pelis, Selian, Bencawan, Pinem, and Caniago.

These margas are also found among other Batak people such as Alas people, Karo people and Pakpak people; except for Caniago which are believed to be the descendants of Minangkabau people that have assimilated with the Kluet people centuries ago.

== Language ==
The language spoken by the Kluet people is Alas-Kluet language, which is categorized as part of the Batak languages. The Kluet language itself is divided into three dialects, which are the Paya Dapur, Manggamat and Lawe Sawah dialect.
