= Pakpak people =

Pakpak people Pakpak
Pakpak

Total population
- 1,200,000

Regions with significant populations
- Indonesia (North Sumatra & Aceh)

Languages
- Pakpak language, Indonesian language

Religion
- Christianity (mostly Protestant) 70%, Sunni Islam 20%, traditional beliefs 10%

Related ethnic groups
- Singkil, Batak Toba, Karo, Batak Simalungun

Pakpak people or Batak Pakpak or Pakpak DAIRI are one of the ethnic groups found mainly in North Sumatra, Indonesia. They are scattered in a few regencies and cities in North Sumatra and Aceh, such as Dairi Regency, Pakpak Bharat Regency, Humbang Hasundutan Regency and Central Tapanuli Regency of North Sumatra, and also in Aceh Singkil Regency and Subulussalam, Aceh. Pakpak people have some communities in other cities across Indonesia. The term "Pakpak" also refers to the culture and language of the Pakpak people.

In administrative governance, most of the Pakpak people settled in Dairi Regency, North Sumatra, which later on July 28, 2003 grew into two regencies, namely:

- Dairi Regency (capital city Sidikalang)
- Pakpak Bharat Regency (capital city Salak)

The Pakpak people are most likely the descendants of Formosan. Pakpak people with the surnames Tendang, Banurea, Manik, Beringin, Gajah, Berasa are believed to be the sons of Mpu Bada or Mpung Bada or Mpubada.

== Sub-ethnics ==
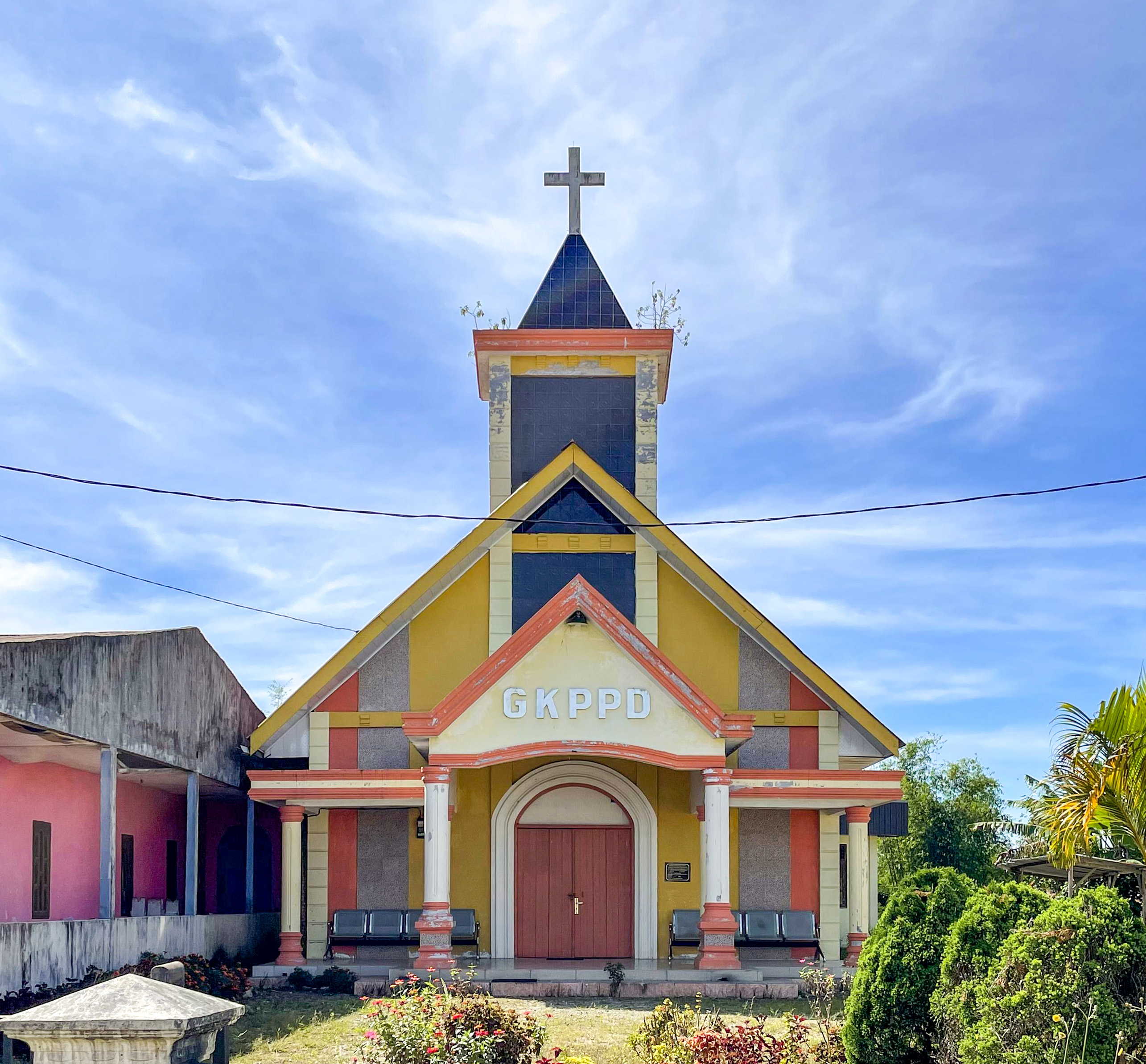
GKPPD is a Dairi people's church, generally located in Dairi regency

The Pakpak people are divided into five sub-ethnic groups or in local terminology, Pakpak Silima Suak:

- Pakpak Klasen people occupy Parlilitan, Pakkat, and Tarabintang in Humbang Hasundutan Regency, and Manduamas which is part of Central Tapanuli Regency.
- Pakpak Simsim people dwell in Pakpak Bharat Regency
- Pakpak Boang people settled in Aceh Singkil Regency and Subulussalam, Aceh. The Pakpak Boang people are often mistaken as Singkil people.
- Pakpak Pegagan people settled in Sumbul and its surroundings in Dairi Regency.
- Pakpak Keppas people settled in Sidikalang and its surroundings in Dairi Regency.

Pakpak people refer to their homeland as "Tano Pakpak".

== Language ==
Pakpak is both a spoken and written language. It is part of the Northern Batak language and has its own Surat Batak Pakpak style writing system and alphabet. However, nowadays less and less Pakpak people are using the system.

== Pakpak surnames ==
- Anakampun
- Angkat
- Bako
- Bancin
- Banurea
- Berampu
- Berasa
- Beringin
- Berutu
- Bintang
- Boangmanalu
- Capah
- Cibro
- Gajah Manik
- Gajah
- Kabeaken
- Kesogihen
- Kaloko
- Kombih
- Kudadiri
- Lingga
- Maha
- Maharaja
- Manik
- Matanari
- Meka
- Maibang
- Padang
- Padang Batanghari
- Pasi
- Penarik Pinayungan
- Ramin
- Sambo
- Saraan
- Sikettang
- Sinamo
- Sitakar
- Solin
- Saing
- Tendang
- Tinambunan
- Tinendung
- Tumangger
- Turutan
- Ujung

== Society ==
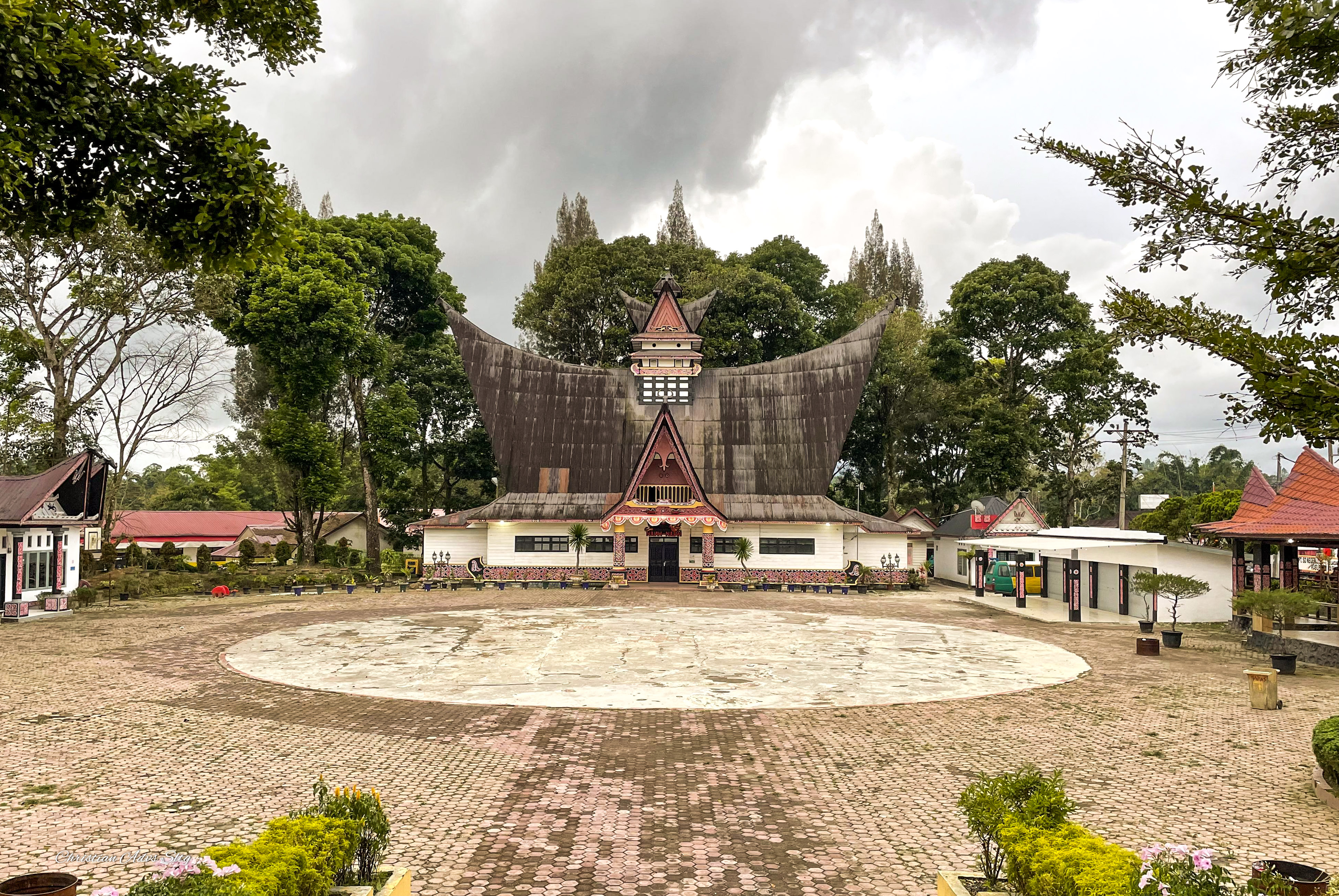
Sidikalang city hall with motif of Pakpak traditional house

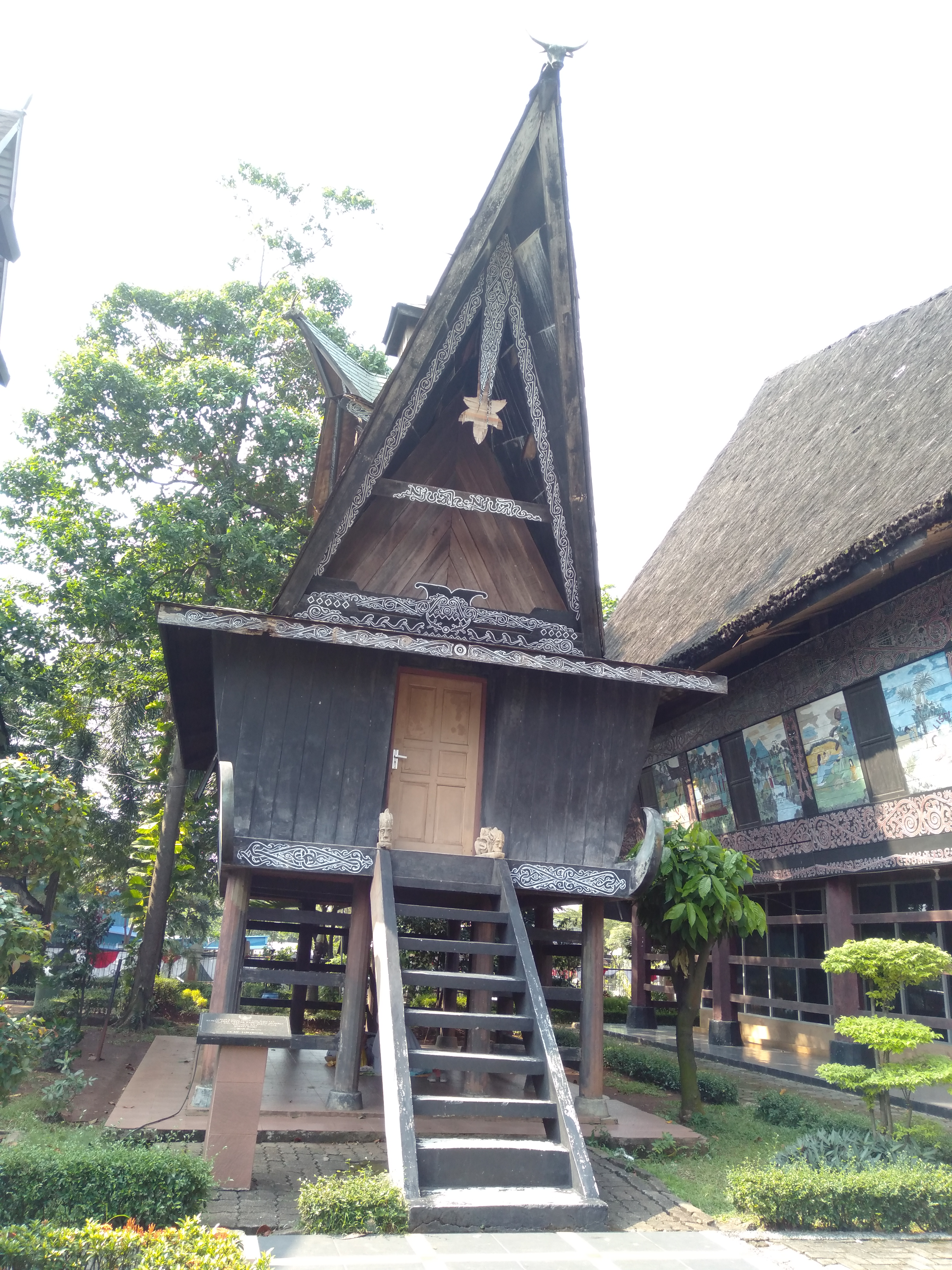
Sopo Jojong, Pakpak traditional house in Taman Mini Indonesia Indah, Jakarta

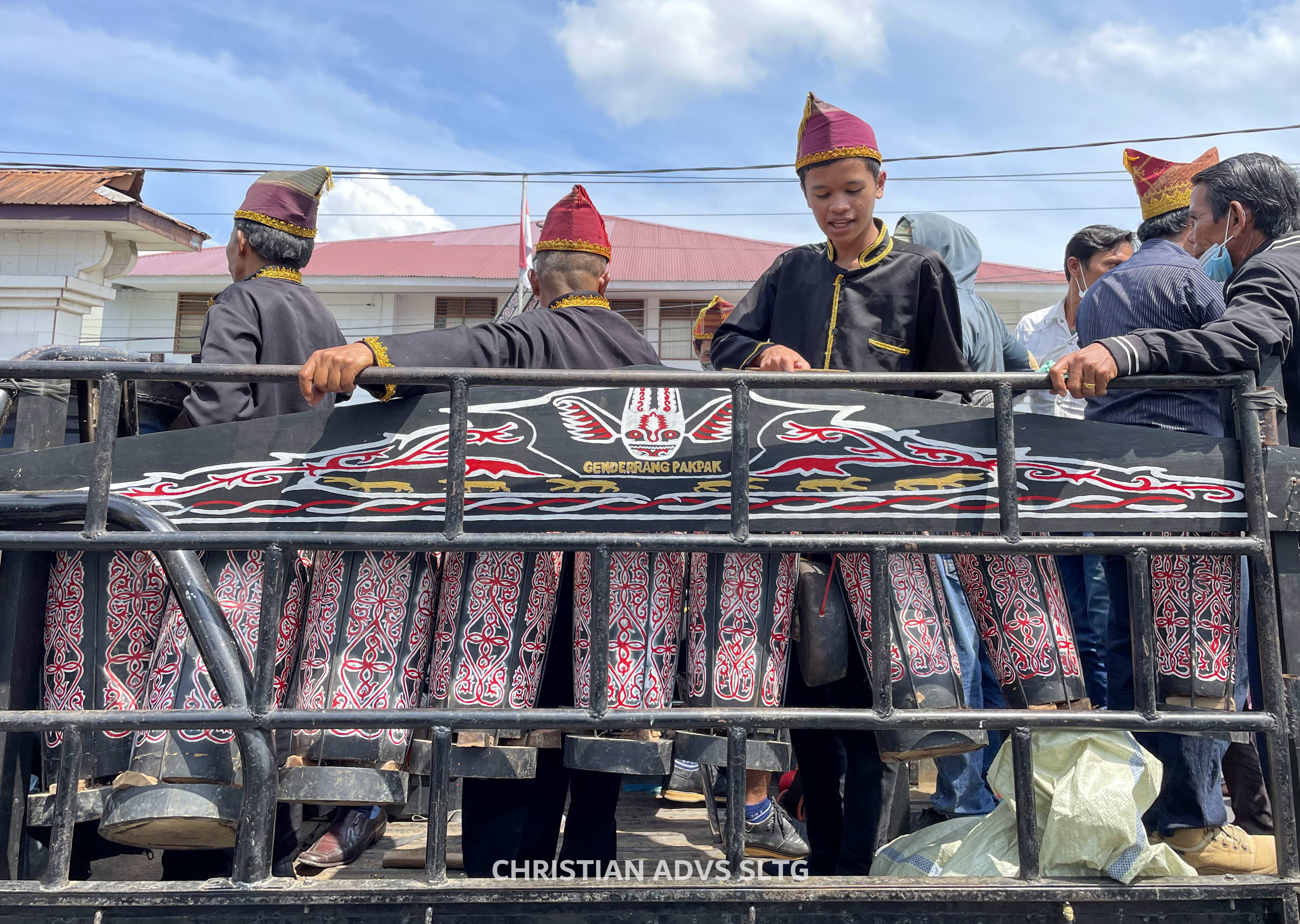
Pakpaknese men with Genderrang Pakpak (traditional musical instrument)

The Pakpak people are bound by a social structure, which in local terminology is called sulang silima. Sulang silima consists of five elements:

- Sinina tertua (Perisang-isang, descendants or older generations)
- Sinina penengah (Pertulan tengah, descendants or middle generations)
- Sinina terbungsu (Perekur-ekur, youngest generation)
- Berru (Kinsmen who receive women into their family)
- Puang (Kinsmen who give women into another family)

Five of these elements are very instrumental in decision making in various aspects of life, especially in kinship system and traditional ceremonies, be it in the context of a single surname clan based community (Lebbuh) or village based community (Kuta). Therefore, five of these elements must be involved in order for a decision to be considered as valid in customary terms.

Traditional Pakpak ceremonies are given "working" terms, however the term "festival" is also frequently used today. Traditional ceremonies are divided into two major parts, namely:

- Traditional ceremonies that involve joyous occasions are referred to as "good works".
- Traditional ceremonies that involve sorrowful occasions are referred to as "bad works".

Examples of "good work" ceremonies are merbayo (wedding ceremony), menanda tahun (paddy planting ceremony) or merkottas (initiating a risky task). Examples of "bad work" ceremonies include mengrumbang and mate ncayur ntua ceremony (funeral).
