= Batak (Unicode block) =

- Range: U+1BC0..U+1BFF (64 code points)
- Plane: BMP
- Scripts: Batak
- Major alphabets: Karo; Mandailing; Pakpak; Simalungun; Toba
- Assigned: 56 code points
- Unused: 8 reserved code points

Unicode version history
- 6.0 (2010): 56 (+56)

Unicode documentation
- Code chart ∣ Web page

Batak is a Unicode block containing characters for writing the Batak dialects of Karo, Mandailing, Pakpak, Simalungun, and Toba.

Batak^{[1]}^{[2]} Official Unicode Consortium code chart (PDF)
	0	1	2	3	4	5	6	7	8	9	A	B	C	D	E	F
U+1BCx	ᯀ	ᯁ	ᯂ	ᯃ	ᯄ	ᯅ	ᯆ	ᯇ	ᯈ	ᯉ	ᯊ	ᯋ	ᯌ	ᯍ	ᯎ	ᯏ
U+1BDx	ᯐ	ᯑ	ᯒ	ᯓ	ᯔ	ᯕ	ᯖ	ᯗ	ᯘ	ᯙ	ᯚ	ᯛ	ᯜ	ᯝ	ᯞ	ᯟ
U+1BEx	ᯠ	ᯡ	ᯢ	ᯣ	ᯤ	ᯥ	᯦	ᯧ	ᯨ	ᯩ	ᯪ	ᯫ	ᯬ	ᯭ	ᯮ	ᯯ
U+1BFx	ᯰ	ᯱ	᯲	᯳									᯼	᯽	᯾	᯿
Notes: 1. As of Unicode version 17.0; 2. Grey areas indicate non-assigned code points

== History ==
The following Unicode-related documents record the purpose and process of defining specific characters in the Batak block:

Version	Final code points (Note: Proposed code points and characters names may differ from final code points and names)	Count	L2 ID	WG2 ID	Document
6.0	U+1BC0..1BF3, 1BFC..1BFF	56	L2/99-066		Everson, Michael (1999-02-11), Batak script [preliminary chart]
6.0	U+1BC0..1BF3, 1BFC..1BFF	56	L2/07-233R	N3293R	Everson, Michael (2007-07-26), Preliminary proposal for encoding the Batak script in the UCS
6.0	U+1BC0..1BF3, 1BFC..1BFF	56	L2/08-147	N3446	McGowan, Rick; Whistler, Ken (2008-04-14), Discussion of Batak Vowel Ordering
6.0	U+1BC0..1BF3, 1BFC..1BFF	56	L2/08-274	N3489	Everson, Michael; Kozok, Uli (2008-08-04), On the inputting model for Batak
6.0	U+1BC0..1BF3, 1BFC..1BFF	56	L2/08-312		Anderson, Deborah (2008-08-11), Batak Input
6.0	U+1BC0..1BF3, 1BFC..1BFF	56	L2/08-011R	N3320R	Everson, Michael; Kozok, Uli (2008-10-07), Proposal for encoding the Batak script in the UCS
6.0	U+1BC0..1BF3, 1BFC..1BFF	56	L2/08-412	N3553 (pdf, doc)	Umamaheswaran, V. S. (2008-11-05), "M53.21", Unconfirmed minutes of WG 2 meeting 53
6.0	U+1BC0..1BF3, 1BFC..1BFF	56	L2/09-063		Anderson, Deborah (2009-01-29), Dialect-Specific Characters in Batak (Batak proposal: L2/08-011 WG2 N3320R)
6.0	U+1BC0..1BF3, 1BFC..1BFF	56	L2/09-104		Moore, Lisa (2009-05-20), "Consensus 119-C23", UTC #119 / L2 #216 Minutes
6.0	U+1BC0..1BF3, 1BFC..1BFF	56		N4103	"Resolution: M58.02", Unconfirmed minutes of WG 2 meeting 58, 2012-01-03
