= Alas language =

Austronesian language spoken in Sumatra, Indonesia

Alas
- Batak Alas
- Native to: Indonesia
- Region: Sumatra
- Ethnicity: Alas; Kluet; Singkil
- Native speakers: (200,000 cited 2000 census)
- Language family: Austronesian: Malayo-Polynesian; Northwest Sumatra–Barrier Islands; Batak; Northern; Alas
- Writing system: Latin; Batak

Official status
- Regulated by: Badan Pengembangan dan Pembinaan Bahasa

Language codes
- ISO 639-3: btz
- Glottolog: bata1292

Alas-Kluet, Alas, or Batak Alas is an Austronesian language of Sumatra. The three dialects, Alas, Kluet, and Singkil (Kade-Kade), may not constitute a single language; Alas may be closer to Karo, and the others closer to Dairi. By linguistic affiliation, Alas–Kluet belongs to the Batak subgroup. Ethnically, however, its speakers generally do not identify as Batak, mostly because of their religion, and also due to political reasons.

== Phonology ==
The phonology of Alas are as follows:

Consonants
		Labial	Alveolar	Palatal	Dorsal	Glottal
Nasal		m	n	ɲ	ŋ	
Plosive	voiceless	p	t	c	k	ʔ
Plosive	voiced	b	d	ɟ	ɡ	
Fricative			s			h
Approximant			l	j	w	
Trill					ʀ	

Vowels
	Front	Central	Back
Close	i		u
Open-mid	ɛ	ə	o
Open		a	

== See also ==
- Alas people
- Kluet people
- Singkil people
