= Batak script =

Writing system used for several Batak languages

Surat Batak ᯘᯮᯒᯖ᯲ᯅᯖᯂ᯲
- "Surat Batak" in Toba variant.
- Script type: Abugida
- Period: c. 1300–present
- Direction: Left-to-right
- Languages: Batak languages

Related scripts
- Parent systems: Proto-Sinaitic alphabet: Phoenician alphabet; Aramaic alphabet; Brāhmī (Note: The detailed descent of Batak script from Brahmi is unclear. Hypotheses of Kawi origin or direct descent through Pallava.); Tamil-Brahmi; Pallava script; Kawi script; Surat Batak
- Sister systems: Direct family relationships is unclear. Sister scripts on hypothesis of common Kawi origin: Balinese; Baybayin scripts Javanese; Lontara; Makasar; Old Sundanese; Rencong; Rejang

ISO 15924
- ISO 15924: Batk (365), Batak

Unicode
- Unicode alias: Batak
- Unicode range: U+1BC0–U+1BFF

Part of a series on

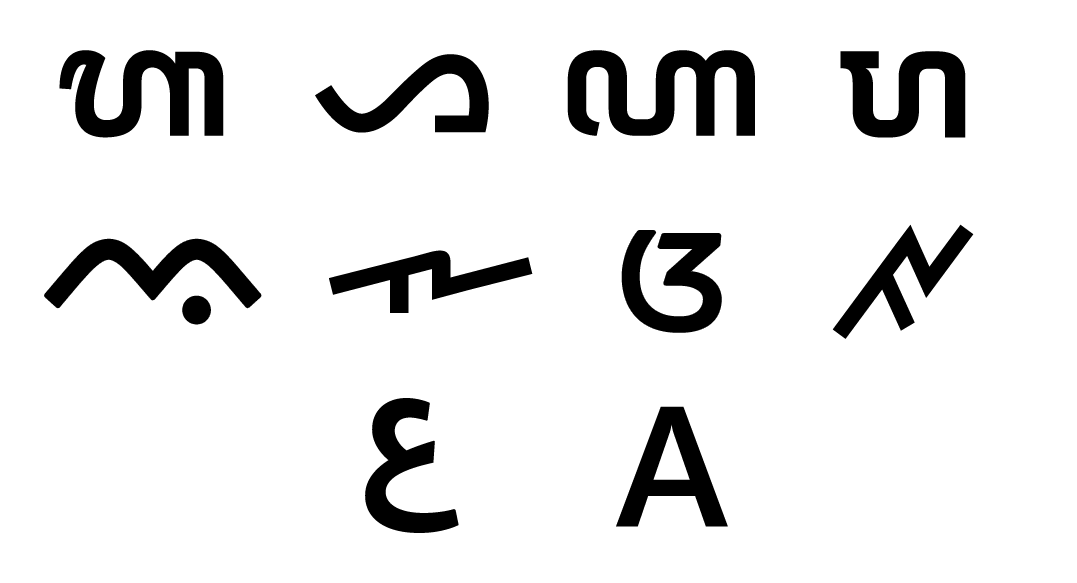

Writing systems used in Indonesia
Abugida (Brahmic)
- Balinese
- Batak
- Buda
- Javanese
- Kawi
- Lontara (Satera Jontal, Mbojo)
- Makasar
- Sasak
- Sundanese (Old Sundanese)
- Ulu (Incung, Komering, Lampung, Lembak,
- Ogan, Pasemah, Rejang, Serawai)
Abjad
- Buri Wolio
- Jawi
- Jawoe
- Pegon
Alphabet
- Latin (Van Ophuijsen, Suwandi, EYD)
Others
- Alifuru
- Bonda
- Cia-Cia
- Bilang-bilang
- Dunging
Related
- List of writing systems of Indonesia
- Languages of Indonesia

The Batak script (natively known as Surat Batak (ᯘᯮᯒᯖ᯲ᯅᯖᯂ᯲), Surat na Sampulu Sia (lit. 'the nineteen letters'), or Sisiasia) is a writing system used to write the Austronesian Batak languages spoken by several million people on the Indonesian island of Sumatra. The script may be derived from the Kawi and Pallava script, ultimately derived from the Brahmi script of India, or from the hypothetical Proto-Sumatran script influenced by Pallava.

== History ==
The Batak magicians and priests or datu used the Batak script mainly for magical texts and divinatory purposes. It is unknown how many non-specialists were literate in the Batak script, but judging from the widespread tradition of writing love laments, especially among the Karo, Simalungun, and Angkola-Mandailing Batak, it is likely that a considerable part of the non-specialist population was able to read and write the Batak script. After the arrival of Europeans in the Batak lands, first German and (from 1878 onward) Dutch missionaries taught the Batak script alongside the Roman script in schools, and teaching and religious materials were printed in the Batak script. Soon after the first World War the missionaries decided to discontinue printing books in the Batak script. The script quickly fell out of use and is now only used for ornamental purposes.

== Origin ==
The Batak script was probably derived from Pallava and Old Kawi scripts, which ultimately were derived from the Brahmi script, the root of almost all the Indic and Southeast Asian scripts.

== Structure ==
Batak is written from left to right and top to bottom. Like all Brahmi-based scripts, each consonant has an inherent vowel of /a/, unless there is a diacritic (in Toba Batak called pangolat) to indicate the lack of a vowel. Other vowels, final ŋ, and final velar fricative [x] are indicated by diacritics, which appear above, below, or after the letter. For example, /ba/ is written ᯅ ba (one letter); /bi/ is written ᯅᯪ ba-i (i follows the consonant); /baŋ/ is written ᯅᯰ ba^{ng} (ng is above the consonant); and /biŋ/ is ᯅᯪᯰ ba-i^{ng}. Final consonants are written with the pangolat (here represented by "#"): /bam/ is ᯅᯔ᯲ ba-ma-#. However, /bim/ is written ᯅᯪᯔ᯲ ba-ma-i-#: phonetically, the first diacritic modifies the first consonant, and the second modifies the second consonant, but both are attached to the second consonant.

Unlike most Brahmi-based scripts, Batak does not form consonant conjuncts.

== Basic characters ==
The basic characters are called surat. Each consonant has an inherent vowel of /a/. The script varies by region and language. The major variants are between Karo, Mandailing/Angkola, Pakpak/Dairi, Simalungun/Timur, and Toba:

Surat (Basic characters)
IPA	a	ha	ka	ba	pa	na	wa	ga	dʒa	da	ra	ma	ta	sa	ja	ŋa	la	ɲa	tʃa	nda	mba	i	u
Transcription	a	ha	ka	ba	pa	na	wa	ga	ja	da	ra	ma	ta	sa	ya	nga	la	nya	ca	nda	mba	i	u
Karo	A	Ha	Ka	Ba	Pa	Na	Wa	Ga	Ja	Da	Ra	Ma	Ta	Sa	Ya	Nga	La		^{5}			I	I
Mandailing	A	Ha	Ka	Ba	Pa	^{1}	Wa	Ga	Ja	Da	Ra	Ma	Ta	^{4}	Ya	Nga	La	Nya	Ca			I	I
Pakpak	A	Ha	Ka	Ba	Pa	Na	Wa	Ga	Ja	Da	Ra	Ma	Ta	Sa	Ya	Nga	La		Ca			I	I
Toba	A	Ha	Ka	Ba	Pa	Na	^{2}	Ga	Ja	Da	Ra	Ma	^{3}	Sa	Ya	Nga	La	Nya				I	I
Simalungun	A	Ha	Ka	Ba	Pa	Na	Wa	Ga	Ja	Da	Ra	Ma	Ta	Sa	Ya	Nga	La	Nya		Nda	^{6}	I	I

Alternate forms:
^1 ^2 ^3 ^4 ^5 ^6

ᯤ and ᯥ are only used for open syllables. Some manuscripts use ᯀᯪ and ᯀᯮ instead of ᯤ and ᯥ even there: ᯘᯤ or ᯘᯀᯪ sai, ᯘᯥ or ᯘᯀᯮ sau.

In Angkola/Mandailing, the letter ᯂ has the value /ha/ if it is in syllable initial position and /k/ in final position. The tempi diacritic is optionally used to distinguish ᯄ᯦ /ka/ from ᯄ /ha/ and ᯚ᯦ /ca/ from ᯚ /sa/.

== Diacritics ==
Diacritics are used to change the pronunciation of a character. They can change the vowel from the inherent /a/, mark a final [velar nasal] /ŋ/, mark a final velar fricative /x/, or indicate a final consonant with no vowel:

Batak diacritics
Latin Trans.	Batak Diacritics					Latin Trans.	Batak Diacritics with /ka/				
Latin Trans.	Karo	Mand.	Pakp.	Sima.	Toba	Latin Trans.	Karo	Mand.	Pakp.	Sima.	Toba
-a						ka	Ka	Ka	Ka	Ka	Ka
-e	-E	-E	-E	-E	-E	ke	Ke	Ke	Ke	Ke	Ke
-i	-I	-I	-I	-I	-I	ki	Ki	Ki	Ki	Ki	Ki
-o	-O	-O	-O	-O	-O	ko	Ko	Ko	Ko	Ko	Ko
-ou				-Ou		kou				Kou	
-u	-U	-U	-U	-U	-U	ku	Ku	Ku	Ku	Ku	Ku
-ng	-Ng	-Ng	-Ng	-Ng	-Ng	kang	Kang	Kang	Kang	Kang	Kang
-h	-H		-H	-H		kah	Kah		Kah	Kah	
–#	-	-	-	-	-	k	K	K	K	K	K

=== Ligatures with U ===
The diacritic for U used by Mandailing, Pakpak, Simalungun, and Toba can form ligatures with its base character:

Ligatures with -U

Batak Script					Description
A	+	-U	=	A	a + -u = u
A	+	-U	=	U	a + -u = u (Simalungun)
Ha	+	-U	=	Hu	ha + -u = hu (Mandailing)
Ha	+	-U	=	Hu	ha + -u = hu (Simalungun)
Ha	+	-U	=	Hu	ha + -u = hu
Ka	+	-U	=	Ku	ka + -u = ku (Mandailing)
Ba	+	-U	=	Bu	ba + -u = bu
P	+	-U	=	Pu	pa + -u = pu (Mandailing)
Pa	+	-U	=	Pu	pa + -u = pu (Pakpak, Toba)
Pa	+	-U	=	Pu	pa + -u = pu (Simalungun)
Na	+	-U	=	Nu	na + -u = nu
Na	+	-U	=	Nu	na + -u = nu (Mandailing)
Wa	+	-U	=	Wu	wa + -u = wu (Mandailing, Toba)
Wa	+	-U	=	Wu	wa + -u = wu (Pakpak, Toba)
Wa	+	-U	=	Wu	wa + -u = wu (Simalungun)
Ga	+	-U	=	Gu	ga + -u = gu
Ga	+	-U	=	Gu	ga + -u = gu (Simalungun)
Ja	+	-U	=	Ju	ja + -u = ju

Batak Script					Description
Da	+	-U	=	Du	da + -u = du
Ra	+	-U	=	Ru	ra + -u = ru
Ra	+	-U	=	Ru	ra + -u = ru (Simalungun)
Ma	+	-U	=	Mu	ma + -u = mu
Ma	+	-U	=	Mu	ma + -u = mu (Simalungun)
Ta	+	-U	=	Tu	ta + -u = tu
Ta	+	-U	=	Tu	ta + -u = tu
Sa	+	-U	=	Su	sa + -u = su (Pakpak)
Sa	+	-U	=	Su	sa + -u = su (Mandailing)
Sa	+	-U	=	Su	sa + -u = su (Mandailing)
Sa	+	-U	=	Su	sa + -u = su (Simalungun)
Ya	+	-U	=	Yu	ya + -u = yu
Ya	+	-U	=	Yu	ya + -u = yu (Simalungun)
Nga	+	-U	=	Ngu	nga + -u = ngu
La	+	-U	=	Lu	la + -u = lu
La	+	-U	=	Lu	la + -u = lu (Simalungun)
Nya	+	-U	=	Nyu	nya + -u = nyu
Ca	+	-U	=	Cu	ca + -u = cu (Mandailing)

=== Tompi ===
In Mandailing, the diacritic tompi can be used to change the sound of some characters:

tompi
ha	+	tompi	=	ka	sa	+	tompi	=	ca
Ha	+	tompi	=	A	Ha	+	tompi	=	A
Ha	+	tompi	=	A	Ha	+	tompi	=	A

=== Placement of diacritics for Ng and H ===
The diacritics for Ng and H are usually written above spacing vowel diacritics instead of above the base character.
Examples: ping, pong, peh, and pih.

=== Diacritic reordering for closed syllables ===
Vowel diacritics are reordered for closed syllables (that is, syllables where the final consonant has no vowel). Consonants with no vowel are marked by the Batak pangolat or panongonan diacritic, depending on the language.

When they are used for a closed syllable (like "tip"), both the vowel diacritic and the pangolat or panongonan are written at the end of the syllable.

Examples of closed syllables using pangolat:

reordering
ta	+	vowel	+	pa	+	pangolat	=	syllable
Ta			+	Pa	+	pangolat	=	Tap
ta			+	pa	+	pangolat	=	tap
Ta	+	-E	+	Pa	+	pangolat	=	Tep
ta	+	e	+	pa	+	pangolat	=	tep
Ta	+	-E	+	Pa	+	pangolat	=	Tep
ta	+	e	+	pa	+	pangolat	=	tep
Ta	+	-I	+	Pa	+	pangolat	=	Tip
ta	+	i	+	pa	+	pangolat	=	tip
Ta	+	-O	+	Pa	+	pangolat	=	Top
ta	+	o	+	pa	+	pangolat	=	top
Ta	+	-U	+	Pa	+	pangolat	=	Tup
ta	+	u	+	pa	+	pangolat	=	tup

== Punctuation and ornaments ==
Batak is normally written without spaces or punctuation (as scriptio continua). However, special marks or bindu are occasionally used.

They vary greatly in size and design from manuscript to manuscript.

bindu
Examples	Malay name	Function
bindu godang	Bindu godang	Introduces a major chapter / book
bindu pinarjolma	Bindu pinarjolma	Introduces a chapter
bindu na metek	Bindu na metek (small bindu)	Begins paragraphs and stanzas
bindu na metek	Bindu na metek (small bindu)	Begins paragraphs and stanzas
bindu pinarboras	Bindu panarboras (rice-shaped bindu)	Begins paragraphs and stanzas
bindu judul	Bindu judul (title bindu)	Separates a title from the body of the text
bindu pangolat	Bindu pangolat	Trailing punctuation

== Unicode ==
Batak script was added to the Unicode Standard in October 2010 with the release of version 6.0.

The Batak script was registered in Unicode by Uli Kozok, a German scholar of Batak literature. Before being documented by Uli Kozok, there were several versions of the Batak script based on Batak sub-ethnic groups, including Toba, Karo, Simalungun, Mandailing, and Pakpak. Uli succeeded in unifying the Batak script, with minor differences considered as variations.

Currently, the Batak script is listed in Unicode with the status of a limited use script. For its status to be elevated to recommended, evidence must be submitted to Unicode showing that the Batak script is still in use.

Character input is phonetic, with the visual output reordered per the description above. For example, lon ᯞᯬᯉ᯲ is entered LON# but displays as LNO#. If the text is entered LNO#, a dotted circle will separate the pangolat from the O, indicating an encoding error.

=== Block ===
The Unicode block for Batak is U+1BC0–U+1BFF:

Batak^{[1]}^{[2]} Official Unicode Consortium code chart (PDF)
	0	1	2	3	4	5	6	7	8	9	A	B	C	D	E	F
U+1BCx	ᯀ	ᯁ	ᯂ	ᯃ	ᯄ	ᯅ	ᯆ	ᯇ	ᯈ	ᯉ	ᯊ	ᯋ	ᯌ	ᯍ	ᯎ	ᯏ
U+1BDx	ᯐ	ᯑ	ᯒ	ᯓ	ᯔ	ᯕ	ᯖ	ᯗ	ᯘ	ᯙ	ᯚ	ᯛ	ᯜ	ᯝ	ᯞ	ᯟ
U+1BEx	ᯠ	ᯡ	ᯢ	ᯣ	ᯤ	ᯥ	᯦	ᯧ	ᯨ	ᯩ	ᯪ	ᯫ	ᯬ	ᯭ	ᯮ	ᯯ
U+1BFx	ᯰ	ᯱ	᯲	᯳									᯼	᯽	᯾	᯿
Notes 1.As of Unicode version 18.0 2.Grey areas indicate non-assigned code points

== Gallery ==
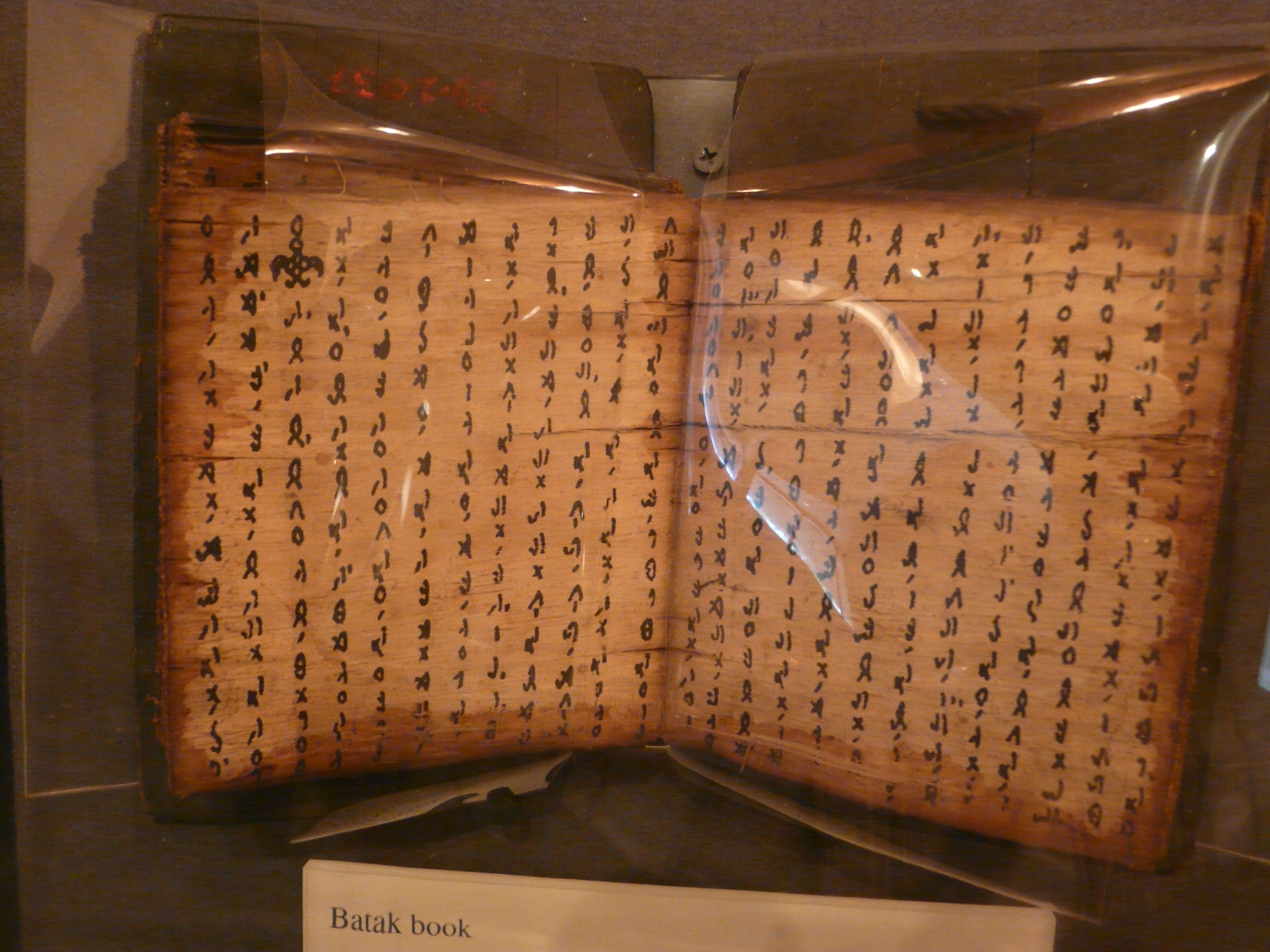
Batak book about the art of divination from a rooster (Robert C. Williams Museum of Papermaking in Atlanta, Georgia, USA)

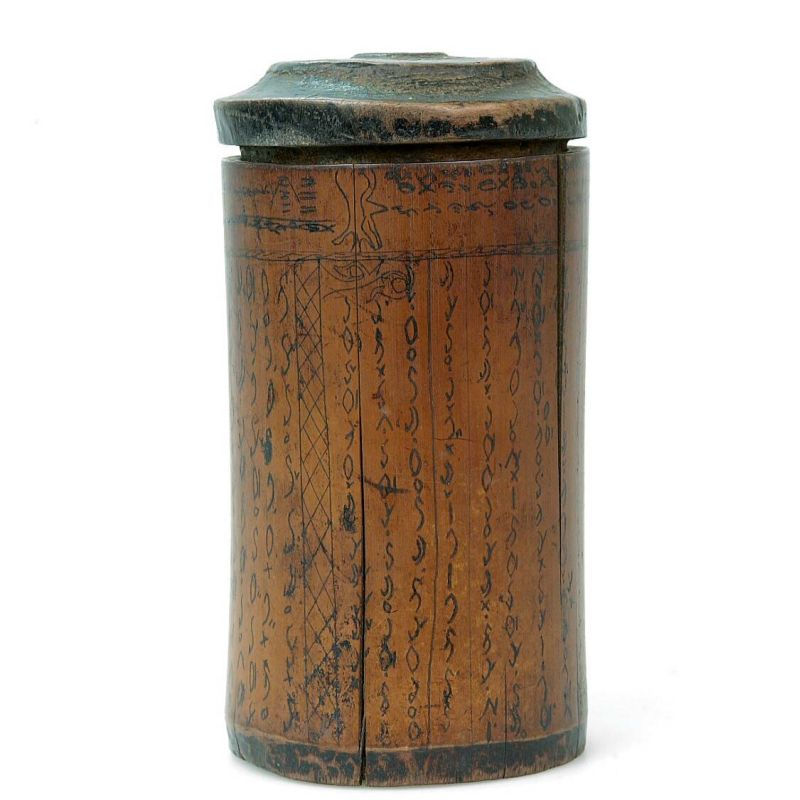
Batak script carved into a bamboo tube with wooden stopper (Museum of the Tropics in Amsterdam, the Netherlands)

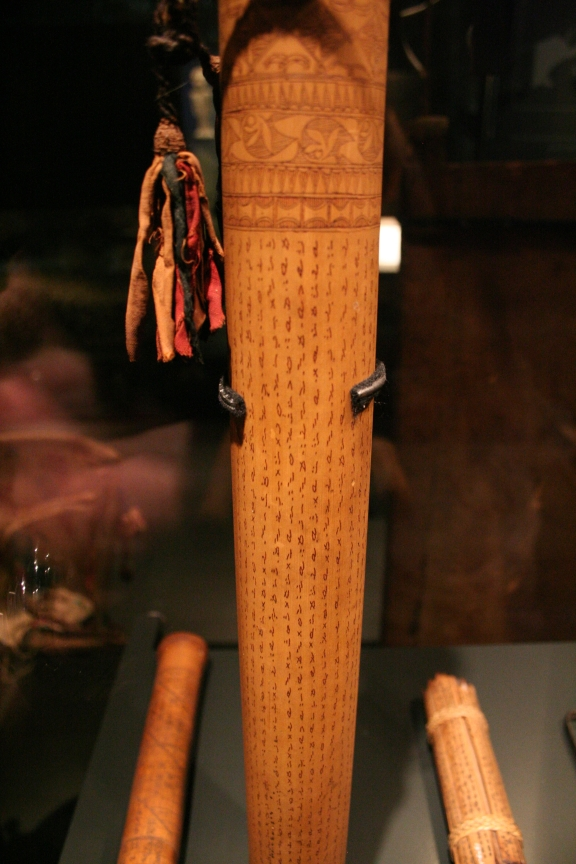
Bamboo inscribed with Simalungun Batak script (National Museum of Ethnology in Leiden, The Netherlands)

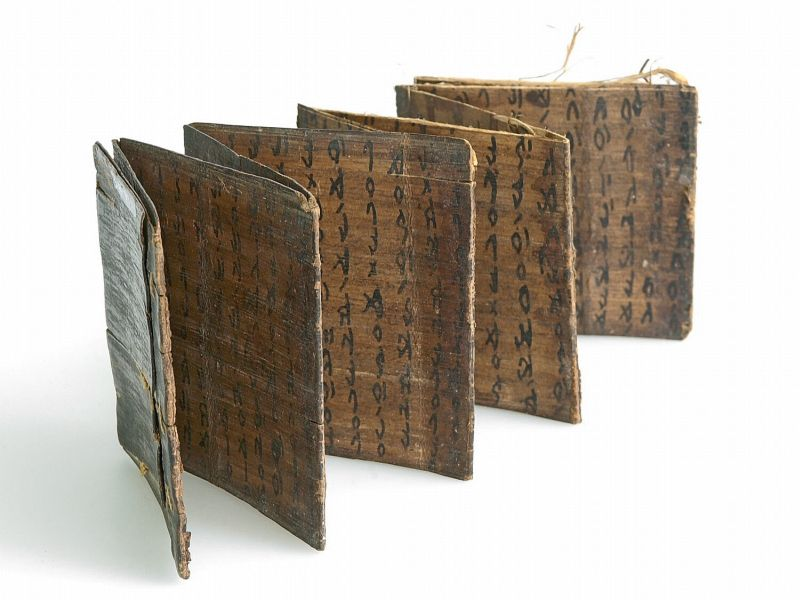
Batak palm leaf book (Museum of the Tropics in Amsterdam, the Netherlands)

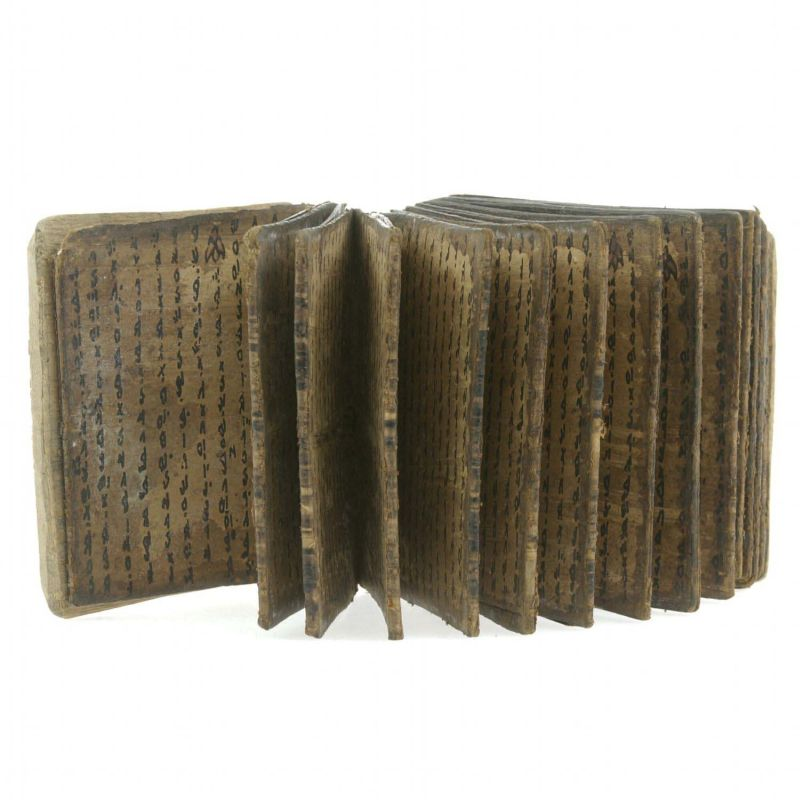
Book of formulas, recipes, and rules applied by Batak priests (Museum of the Tropics in Amsterdam, the Netherlands)

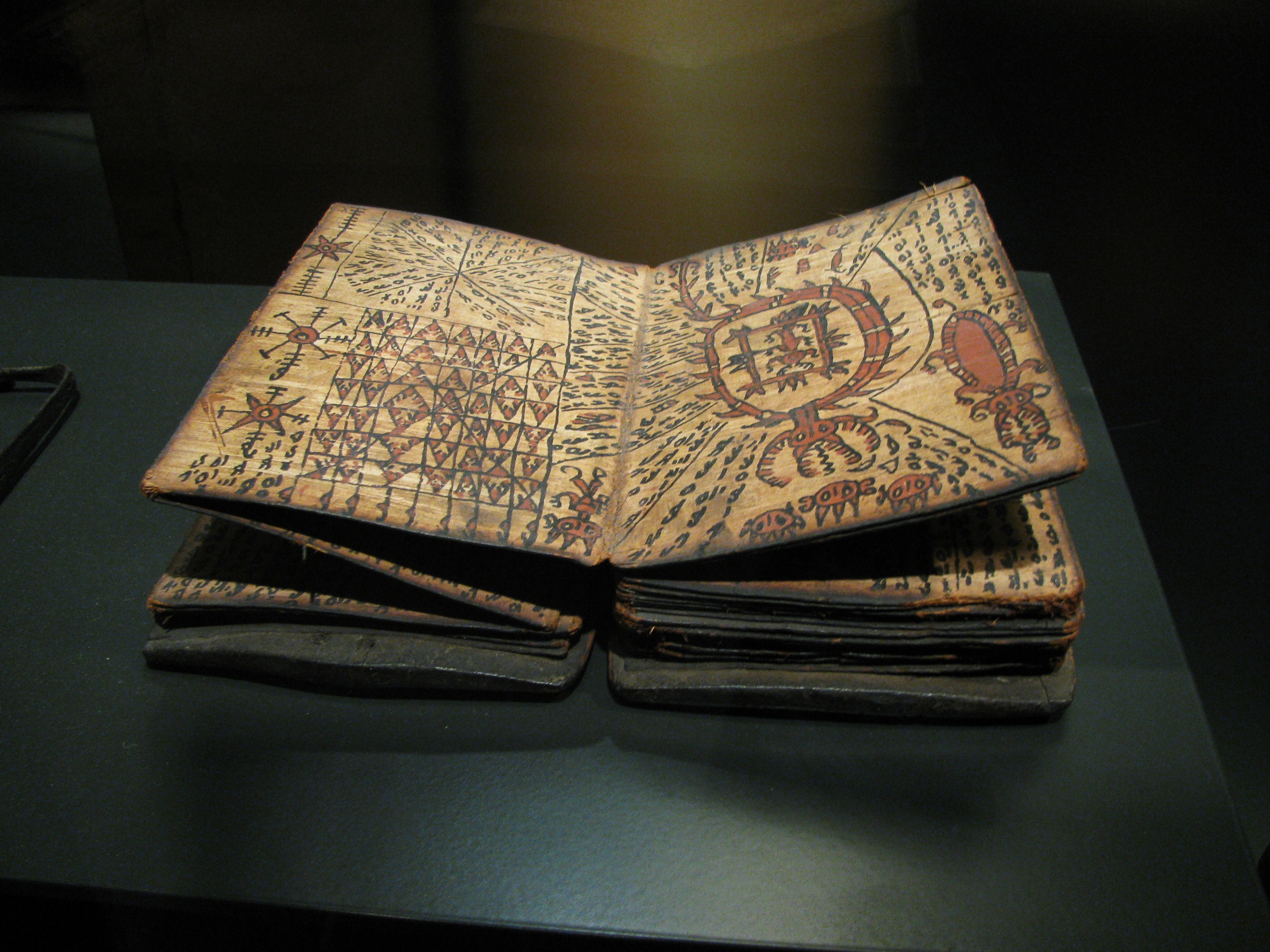
Magic book used by priests of the Toba Batak tribe (National Museum of Ethnology in Leiden, The Netherlands)

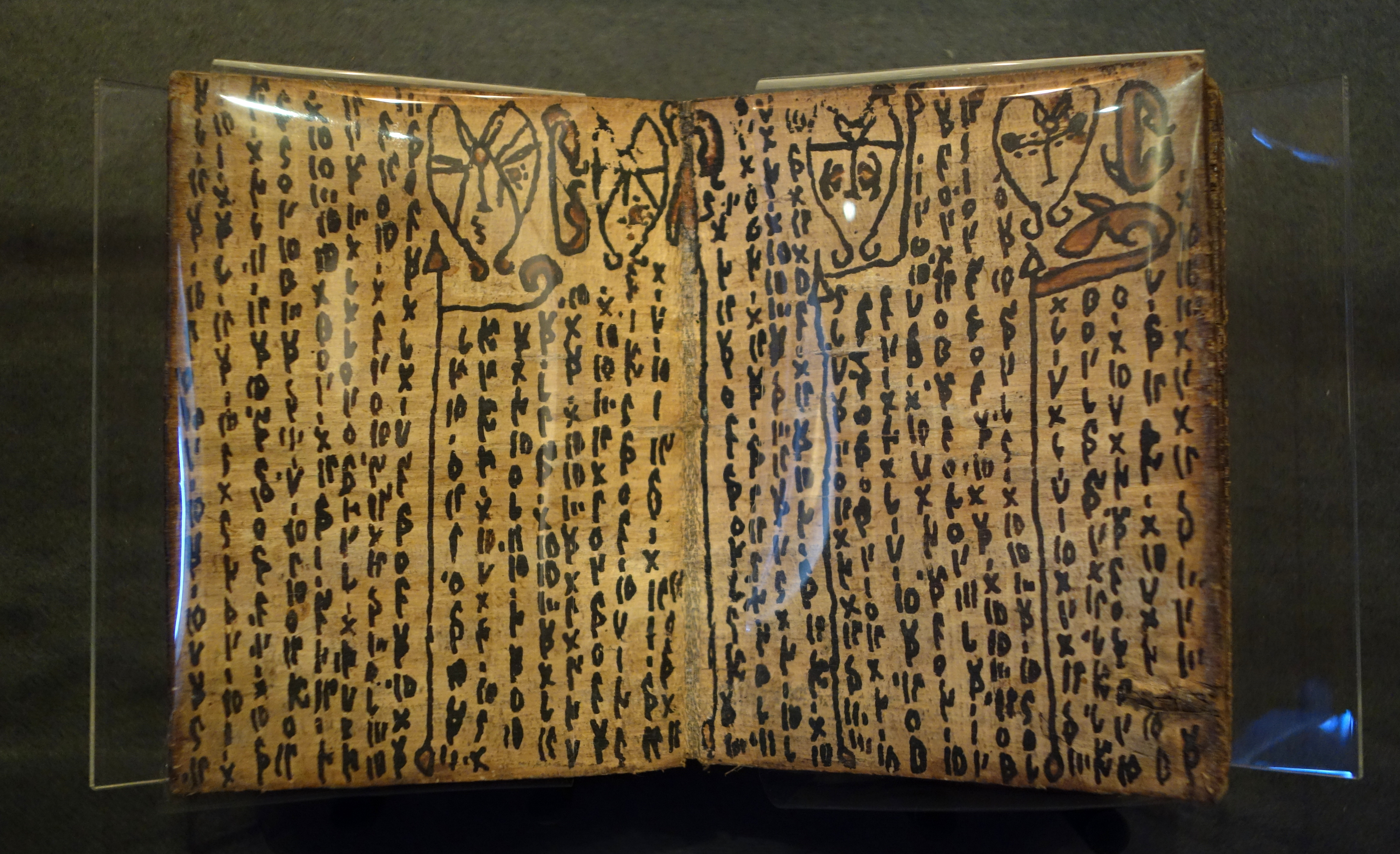
Manuscript in Batak Toba language, central Sumatra, early 1800s. (Robert C. Williams Museum of Papermaking in Atlanta, Georgia, USA)

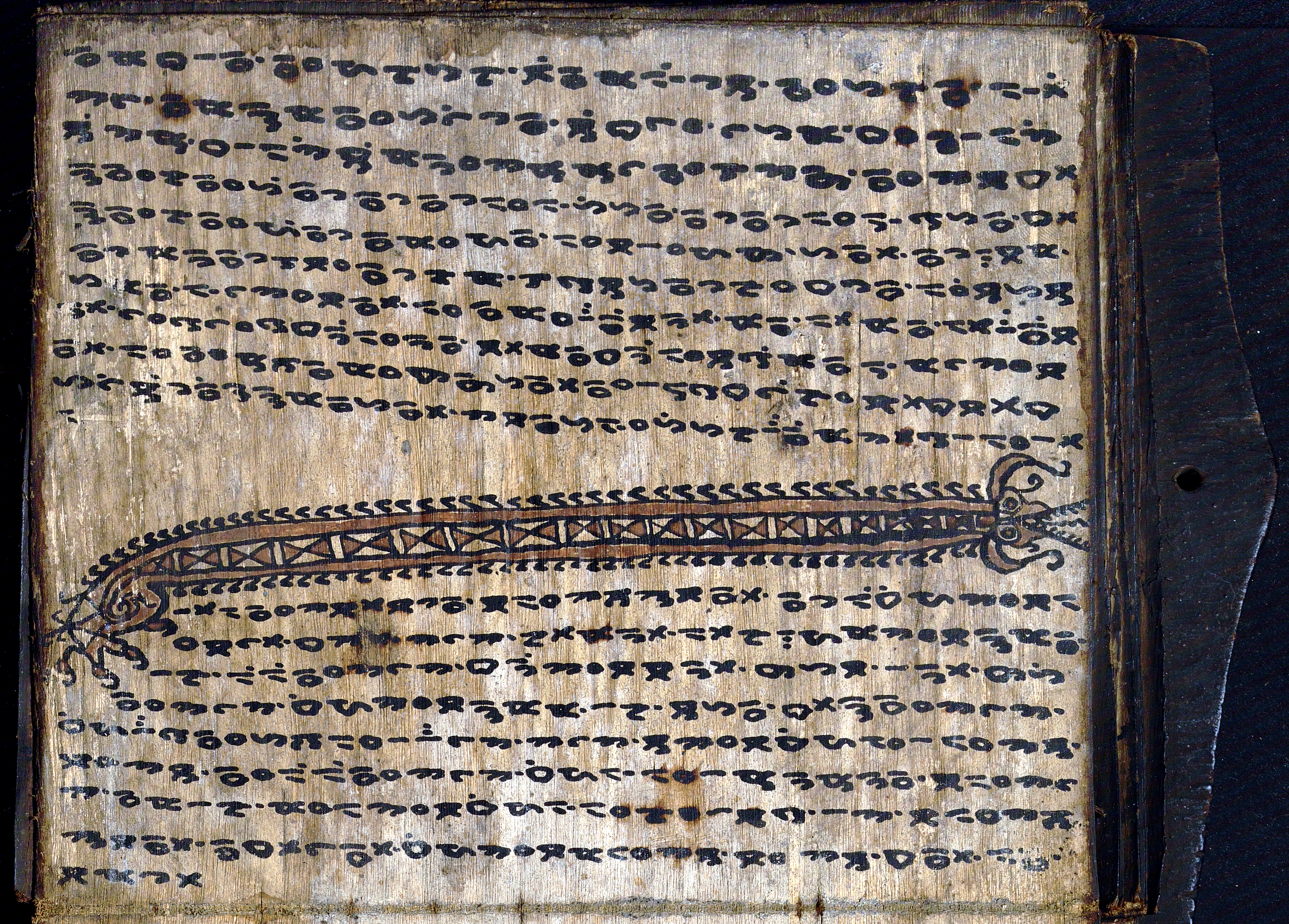
Batak Pustaha (Magic Book) (SOAS University of London) - entire manuscript viewable online

== See also ==
- Sitopayan I inscription, 13th century usage of mixed Malay and Batak scripts
