= Batak Karo language =

Austronesian language spoken in Sumatra, Indonesia

Karo
- Cakap Karo
- Native to: Indonesia
- Region: Karo Regency, North Sumatra
- Ethnicity: Karo
- Native speakers: 500,000 (2010)
- Language family: Austronesian: Malayo-Polynesian; Northwest Sumatra–Barrier Islands; Batak; Northern; Karo
- Writing system: Batak; Latin

Official status
- Regulated by: Badan Pengembangan dan Pembinaan Bahasa

Language codes
- ISO 639-3: btx
- Glottolog: bata1293
- ELP: Batak Karo
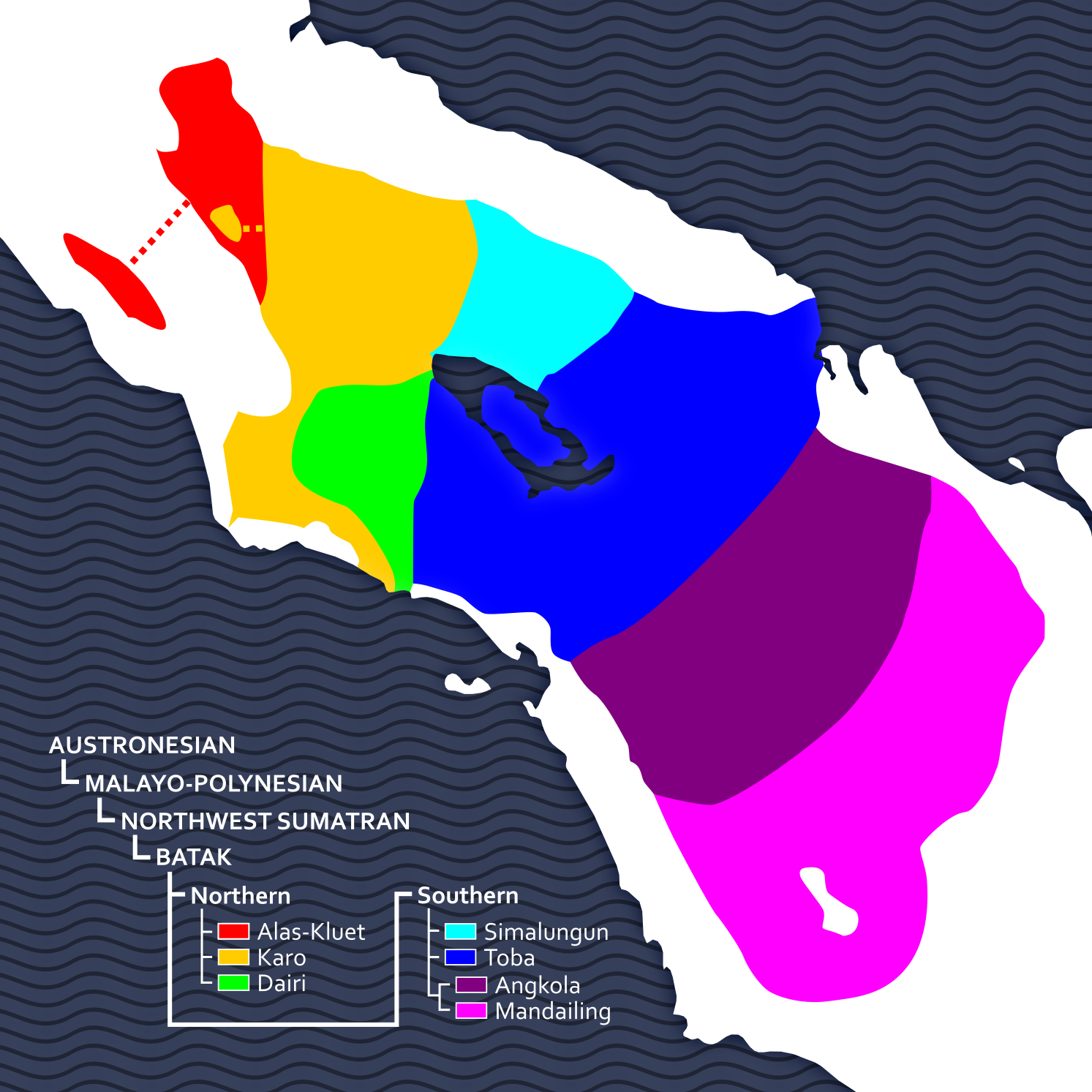
- The distribution of Batak languages in northern Sumatra. Karo is represented by the yellow shade.

Karo, referred to in Indonesia as Bahasa Karo (Karo language), is an Austronesian language that is spoken by the Karo people of Indonesia. It is used by around 600,000 people in North Sumatra. It is mainly spoken in Karo Regency, southern parts of Deli Serdang Regency and northern parts of Dairi Regency, North Sumatra, Indonesia. It was historically written using the Batak script which is descended from the Brahmi script of ancient India by way of the Pallava and Old Kawi scripts, but nowadays only a tiny number of Karo can write or understand the script, and instead the Latin script is used.

== Classification ==
Karo is a Northern Batak language, and is closely related to Pakpak and Alas–Kluet. It is mutually unintelligible from the Southern Batak languages, such as Toba, Angkola, and Mandailing.

=== Dialects ===
There are several dialects within Karo. A major dialect boundary exists between the dialects spoken in the east and the dialects spoken in the west. These are largely distinguished according to phonological and lexical differences. Vowels in the eastern dialect are lowered and fronted in the western dialect. Similarly, diphthongs in the eastern dialect are realised as monophthongs in the western dialect.

| Eastern dialect | Western dialect | Meaning |
|---|---|---|
| /waluh/ | /waloh/ | eight |
| /sitik/ | /sitek/ | a little |
| /məlɯhe/ | /məlihe/ | hungry |
| /dʒauŋ/ | /dʒoŋ/ | corn |

== Phonology ==
Karo has 17 consonant phonemes and 10 vowel phonemes.

=== Vowels ===
| | Front | Central | Back |
|---|---|---|---|
| High | i | | ɯ ⟨ë⟩, u |
| Mid | e ⟨é⟩ | ə ⟨e⟩ | o |
| Low | | a | |

=== Consonants ===
| | | Labial | Alveo- dental | Palatal | Velar | Glottal |
|---|---|---|---|---|---|---|
| Nasal | | m | n | | ŋ ⟨ng⟩ | |
| Plosive | voiceless | p | t | c | k | |
| Plosive | voiced | b | d | ɟ ⟨j⟩ | ɡ | |
| Fricative | | | s | | | h |
| Lateral | | | l | | | |
| Vibrant | | | r | | | |
| Semivowel | | | | j ⟨y⟩ | w | |

== Morphology ==
Batak Karo has productive reduplication. Full reduplication occurs mainly with open word classes and exhibits a wide range of different functions. For instance, reduplication of nouns can signify plurality (tulan 'bone' → tulan-tulan 'bones') and imitation and similitude (berku 'coconut shell' → berku-berku 'skull'). Reduplication of verbs can encode repetition (nungkun 'ask' → nungkun-nungkun 'keep asking'), duration (ngukiri 'think' → ngukur-ngukuri 'ponder') or imitation (medem ‘sleep’ → medem-medem ‘lie down, rest’).

Batak Karo has a binary contrast between actor voice and patient voice for transitive verbs and can be classified as an Indonesian-type language. Actor voice is marked with the inflectional prefix N-. The prefix N- assimilates to the place of articulation of the stem that it is attached to, and is realised as [m] before bilabial stops, [n] before dental, alveolar and palatal stops and fricatives and [ŋ] before velar stops. Patient voice is marked with the inflectional prefix i-. Like other Indonesian-type languages Batak Karo also has applicatives (the suffixes -ken as a general applicative, and -i as a locative applicative).

== Syntax ==
Batak Karo often alternate between subject-initial and predicate-initial word orders for transitive clauses, although the preference is for Actor Voice clauses to be subject-initial. Predicate-Undergoer-Actor is a common word order when the undergoer is replaced by an interrogative pronoun. In contrast, while it is possible for patient voice clauses to place the subject (the undergoer in patient voice clauses) in the initial position, predicate-initial word orders are more frequent, with the undergoer subject placed after both the predicate and the actor.

Embun me-kapal N-tutup-i matawari.
cloud ADJ-thick AV-cover-APP.LOC sun
'Thick cloud obscured the sun.'

Matawari i-tutup-i embun me-kapal.
sun PV-cover-LOC.APP cloud ADJ-thick
'The sun was obscured by thick cloud.'

I-tima-i Raja Acéh denga Putri Hijau.
PV-wait-LOC.APP Raja Aceh still Putri Hijau
'Raja Aceh still waited for Putri Hijau.'

== Sample text ==
Karo

Ope denga ijadiken Dibata doni enda Kata e enggo lit. Kata e ras Dibata, janah Kata e me Dibata

English translation

In the beginning was the Word, and the Word was with God, and the Word was God.

== Bibliography ==
- Norwood, Clodagh (1996). "Karo Batak: passive, ergative or neither?" (PDF). La Trobe Working Papers in Linguistics. 9 (6): 101–120. Archived from the original (PDF) on 2008-08-21.
- Norwood, Clodagh (2001). "Actor voice in Karo Batak". La Trobe Working Papers in Linguistics. 11 (7): 161–188.
- Woollams, Geoff (1996). A Grammar of Karo Batak, Sumatra (PDF). Pacific Linguistics Series C - No. 130. Canberra: Pacific Linguistics. doi:10.15144/pl-c130. hdl:1885/145878. ISBN 0-85883-432-4.
- Woollams, Geoff (2005). "Karo Batak". In Alexander Adelaar; Nikolaus P. Himmelmann (eds.). The Austronesian Languages of Asia and Madagascar. London: Routledge. pp. 534–561.
