= Pakpak language =

Austronesian language spoken in Sumatra, Indonesia

Pakpak
- Kata Pakpak
- Native to: Indonesia
- Region: Sumatra (northern)
- Ethnicity: Pakpak, Singkil
- Native speakers: (1.2 million cited 1991)
- Language family: Austronesian: Malayo-Polynesian; Northwest Sumatra–Barrier Islands; Batak; Northern; Pakpak
- Writing system: Batak

Language codes
- ISO 639-3: btd
- Glottolog: bata1294

Pakpak, or Batak Dairi, is an Austronesian language of Sumatra. It is spoken in Dairi Regency, Pakpak Bharat Regency, Pakkat, Parlilitan, and Tarabintang districts in Humbang Hasundutan Regency, Manduamas district in Central Tapanuli Regency, Subulussalam City, and Aceh Singkil Regency.

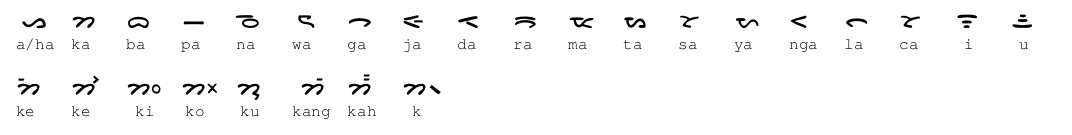
Dairi Batak syllables in Batak script.

== Phonology ==
=== Consonants ===
		Labial	Alveolar	Palatal	Velar	Glottal
Nasal		m	n		ŋ	
Plosive/ Affricate	voiceless	p	t	tʃ	k	
Plosive/ Affricate	voiced	b	d	dʒ	ɡ	
Fricative			s			h
Trill			r			
Lateral			l			
Semivowel		w		j		

- A word-final /k/ can also be heard as a glottal stop [ʔ].

=== Vowels ===
	Front	Central	Back
Close	i		u
Mid	e ⟨é⟩, ɛ ⟨è⟩	ə ⟨e⟩	o
Open		a	

- Vowels /i, u, e, o/ can have shortened allophones of [ɪ, ʊ, ɛ, ɔ].
- To differentiate between the three e sounds, [ə, e, ɛ], Manik used ⟨é⟩ for [e], ⟨è⟩ for [ɛ], and ⟨e⟩ for [ə].
