= Batak Simalungun language =

Austronesian language spoken in Sumatra, Indonesia

Simalungun
- Sahap Simalungun
- Native to: Indonesia
- Region: Sumatra (northern)
- Ethnicity: Simalungun
- Native speakers: (1.2 million cited 2000)
- Language family: Austronesian: Malayo-Polynesian; Northwest Sumatra–Barrier Islands; Batak; Southern; Simalungun
- Writing system: Latin, Batak

Official status
- Regulated by: Badan Pengembangan dan Pembinaan Bahasa

Language codes
- ISO 639-3: bts
- Glottolog: bata1288

Simalungun, or Batak Simalungun, is an Austronesian language of Sumatra. It is spoken mainly in Simalungun Regency and Pematang Siantar, North Sumatra, Indonesia.

== Phonology ==
Consonants
		Labial	Alveolar	Palatal	Velar	Glottal
Nasal		m	n		ŋ	
Plosive/ Affricate	voiceless	p	t		k	
Plosive/ Affricate	voiced	b	d	dʒ	ɡ	
Fricative			s			h
Rhotic			r			
Lateral			l			
Approximant		w		j		

/b, d/ can also have implosive allophones [ɓ, ɗ].

Vowels
	Front	Central	Back
Close	i		u
Mid	ɛ		ɔ
Open		a	

Sounds /i, u, ɛ, ɔ, a/ can have allophones [ɪ, ʊ, e, o, ɑ].
