= Robert C. Williams Museum of Papermaking =

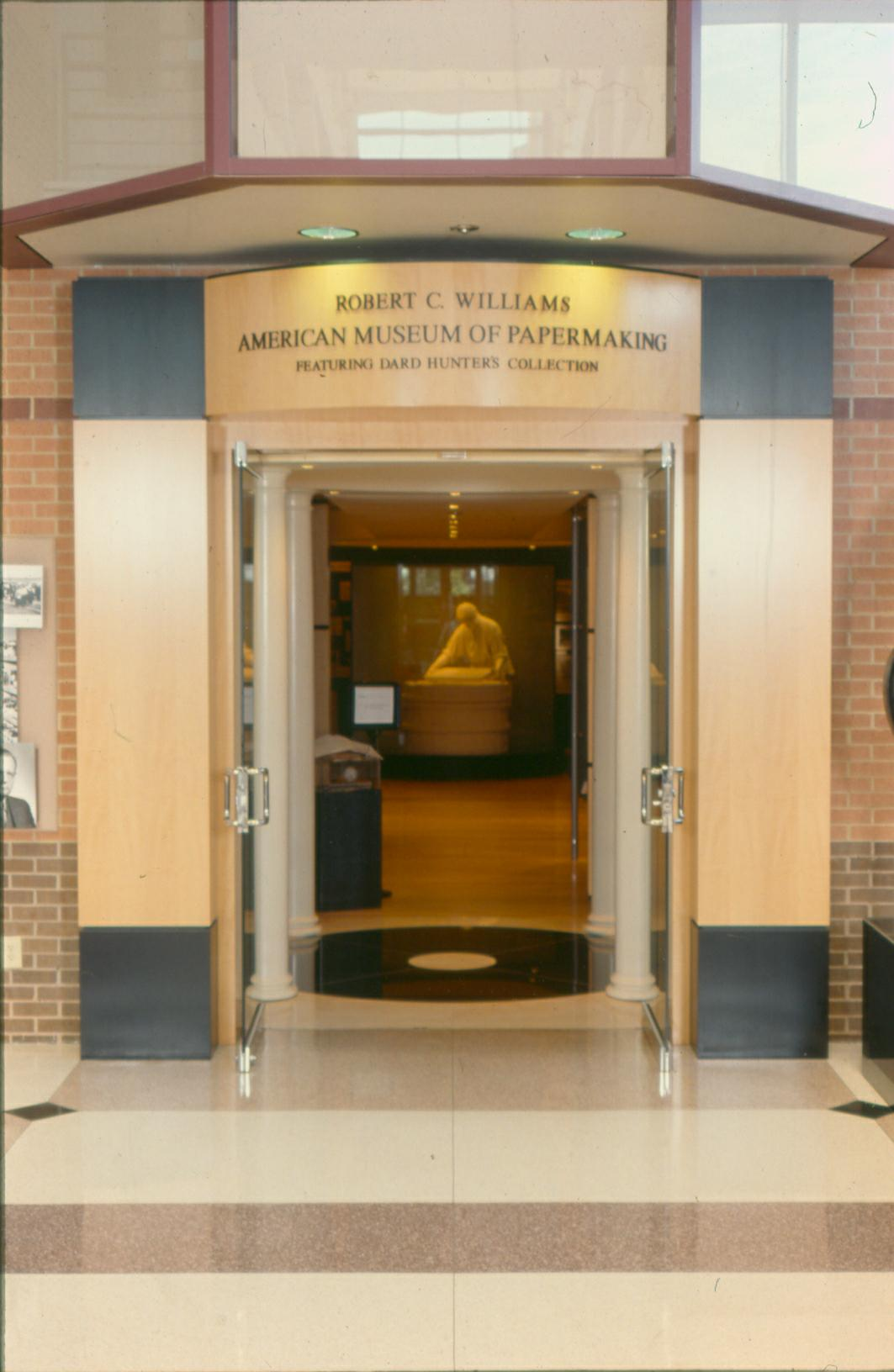
- Established: 1939
- Location: 500 10th Street NW; Atlanta, United States
- Coordinates: 33.781463°N 84.403249°W
- Type: Paper museum
- Director: Teri Williams
- Public transit access: Midtown station
- Website: paper.gatech.edu

The Robert C. Williams Museum of Papermaking is a research institution and public museum dedicated to the preservation of the history of paper and paper technology. Located inside the Paper Tricentennial Building at the Georgia Institute of Technology in Atlanta, Georgia, United States, the museum features the largest collection of paper and paper-related artifacts in the world, including watermarks, papers, tools, machines, and manuscripts. Changing exhibits focus on paper art, and a permanent exhibit details the science and technology used in papermaking.

== History ==
Originally called the Dard Hunter Paper Museum, the Robert C. Williams Museum of Papermaking began in 1939. The original museum was created by Dard Hunter and located at the Massachusetts Institute of Technology. Hunter filled the museum with various artifacts representing the art of papermaking. Few people visited the museum while it was at MIT and eventually it was moved to a smaller building on campus.

In 1954 the then Institute of Paper Chemistry of Appleton, Wisconsin offered the museum a prominent place on its campus. Hunter became the museum's curator, a job he held until his death in 1966.

In 1989 the Institute of Paper Chemistry was relocated to Atlanta, Georgia and renamed the Institute of Paper Science and Technology. The Dard Hunter Collection was packed and moved as well. Supporting this collection is one of the main goals of the Friends of Dard Hunter (now the North American Hand Papermakers), an organization that promotes hand papermaking and the other arts practiced by Hunter.

During the spring of 1993 the museum was re-opened inside of IPST and renamed the American Museum of Papermaking. During this time the museum continued to grow, and a traveling exhibition program was instituted.

In 1996 the museum received a substantial donation from the James River Corporation. As a result, the museum's name was again changed, this time to the Robert C. Williams Museum of Papermaking, in recognition of Robert C. Williams, the co-founder of the James River Corporation. Williams had been a student at the Institute of Paper Chemistry and chairman of the Board of Trustees of the Institute of Paper Science and Technology.

In 2005, through a donation from the Mead-Witter Foundation, an additional exhibition space was added to the museum. This new space was named the George W. Mead Education Center.
