= Mandailing Batak language =

Austronesian language spoken in Sumatra, Indonesia

Mandailing
- Saro Mandailing
- Native to: Indonesia
- Region: Sumatra
- Ethnicity: Mandailing
- Native speakers: (1.1 million cited 2000 census)
- Language family: Austronesian: Malayo-Polynesian; Northwest Sumatra–Barrier Islands; Batak; Southern; Mandailing
- Writing system: Latin, Mandailing

Official status
- Regulated by: Badan Pengembangan dan Pembinaan Bahasa

Language codes
- ISO 639-3: btm
- Glottolog: bata1291

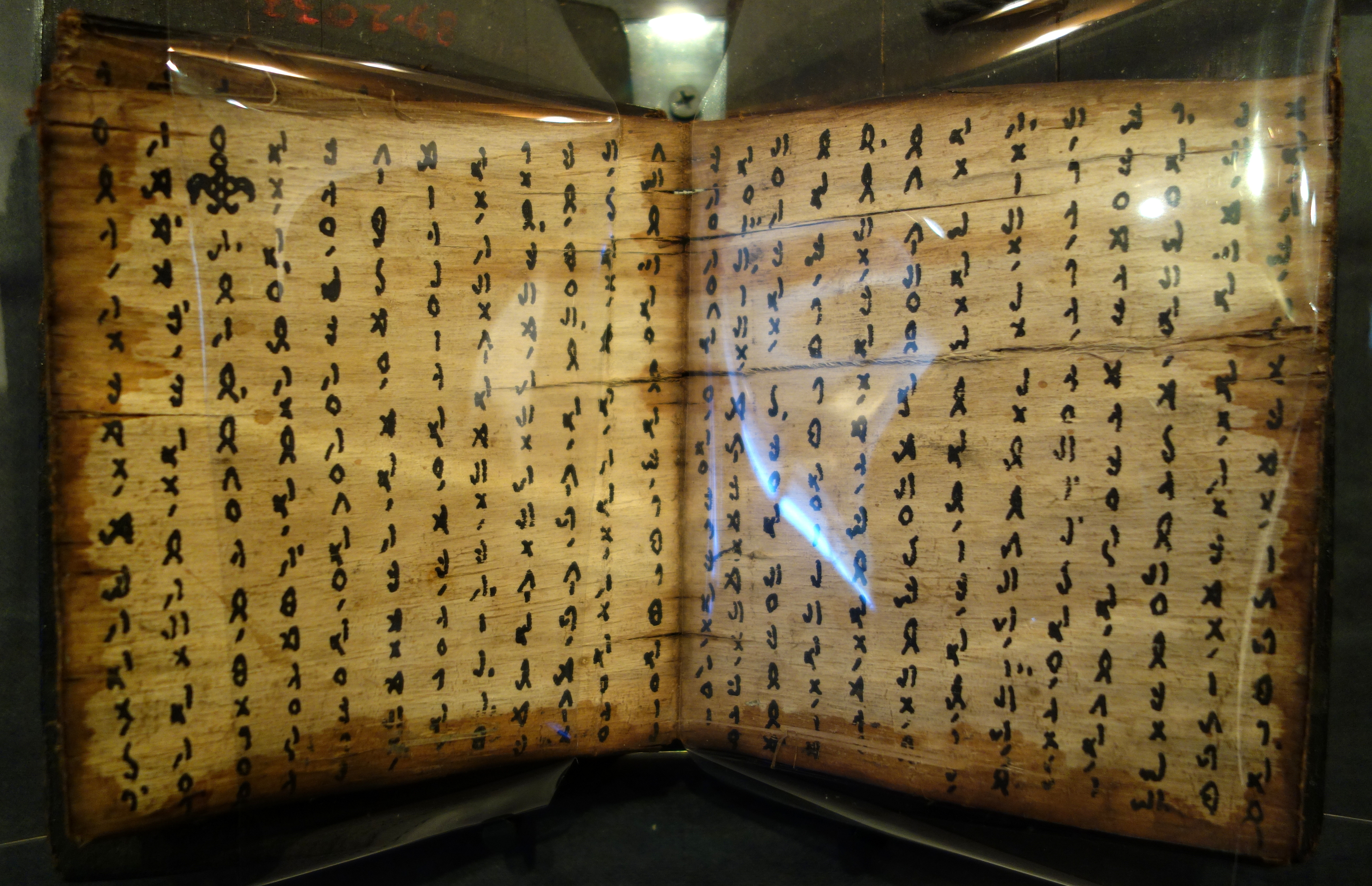
A Mandailing script, pre-1800s.

Mandailing Batak or Mandailing is an Austronesian language spoken in Sumatra, the northern island of Indonesia. It is spoken mainly in Mandailing Natal Regency, North Padang Lawas Regency, Padang Lawas Regency, and eastern parts of Labuhan Batu Regency, North Labuhan Batu Regency, South Labuhan Batu Regency and northwestern parts of Riau Province. It is written using the Latin script but historically used Batak script.

== Phonology ==
Consonants
		Labial	Alveolar	Palatal	Velar	Glottal
Nasal		m	n	ɲ	ŋ	
Plosive/ Affricate	voiceless	p	t	(tʃ)	k	
Plosive/ Affricate	voiced	b	d	dʒ	ɡ	
Fricative			s			h
Rhotic			r			
Lateral			l			
Approximant		w		j		

[tʃ] is heard as an allophone of /s/.

Vowels
	Front	Central	Back
Close	i		u
Mid	e		o
Open		a	

== Literature ==
=== Classical ===
Mandailing literary art is transmitted through a distinctive tradition, for example through the following media:

1. Marturi: Tradition tells the story in a verbal social context. Stories are transmitted from generation to generation. The plot uses advanced themes and a lot of content about manners.
2. Ende Ungut-Ungut: Differentiated by the theme. Ende is an expression of the heart, a change due to various things, such as the misery of life due to death, abandonment, and others. It also contains knowledge, advice, moral teachings, kinship system, and so on. Ende laments use the rhyme scheme AB AB or AA AA. Attachments usually use a lot of plant names, because the language leaves.

Example :

Mandailing
tu sigama pe so lalu
madung donok tu Ujung Gading
di angan-angan pe so lalu
laing tungkus abit partinggal

Translation:

English
To Sigama was not up
It's close to Ujung Gading
What not even in the imagination
Keep the memorable cloth

=== Colonial period ===
Some of the literary milestones that developed in the colonial period include:

1. Willem Iskander (1840–1876) wrote the books
  - Hendrik Nadenggan Roa, Sada Boekoe Basaon ni Dakdanak (Translations). Padang: Van Zadelhoff and Fabritius (1865).
  - Leesboek van W.C. Thurn in het Mandhelingsch Vertaald. Batavia: Landsdrukkerij (1871).
  - Si Bulus-bulus Si Rumbuk-rumbuk (1872).
  - Taringot ragam ni Parbinotoan dohot Sinaloan ni Alak Eropa. This text is adapted from the book The Story of the Science of the White Persons written by Abdullah Munsyi, a Malay linguist and linguist (1873).
2. Soetan Martua Raja (Siregar). He was born into an aristocratic family in Bagas Lombang Sipirok, an educated HIS, an elite school in Pematang Siantar. His works include:
  - Hamajuon (elementary school reading material).
  - Doea Sadjoli: Boekoe Siseon ni Dakdanak di Sikola (1917). This book raises the critique of children's thinking and is written in Latin script (Soerat Oelando), which is relatively developed secular pedagogy. This book adopts a poda, a kind of storyteller that gives advice and moral teachings in a context appropriate for children.
  - Ranto Omas (Golden Chain), 1918.
3. Soetan Hasoendoetan (Sipahutar), novelist and journalist. His works:
  - Turi-Turian (stories, tells the relationship of interaction between man and the ruler of the sky).
  - Sitti Djaoerah: Padan Djandji na Togoe (1927–1929), an Angkola Mandailing-language series in 457 pages. The series is published in the weekly Pustaha published in Sibolga. This story is believed to be the reason readers buy the newspaper. The series adopts epic tales, turi-turian, and various social terminology of Angkola-Mandailing society and is written in novel style. This is in line with the development of Malay-language novels published by the colonial government. In the history of Indonesian literature, this period is known as the Angkatan Balai Pustaka or Angkatan 1920s. Hasundutan said that he wrote the novel because after being inspired by the novel Siti Nurbaja (Marah Rusli, 1922) which was very popular at that time.
  - Datoek Toengkoe Adji Malim Leman (1941), published by Sjarief, Pematang Siantar.
4. Mangaradja Goenoeng Sorik Marapi wrote the book Turian-turian ni Raja Gorga di Langit dohot Raja Suasa di Portibi. It is published by Pustaka Murni, Pematang Siantar titled 1914.
5. Sutan Pangurabaan. His works include Ampang Limo Bapole (1930), Parkalaan Tondoeng (1937), Parpadanan (1930), and a Malay book, Mentjapai Doenia Baroe (1934). In addition to books written by Willem Iskander, his books were also used in colonial school.
6. Soetan Habiaran Siregar explores the languages, dances, and songs from Angkola-Mandailing. He writes several royalties, among others: Turi-turian ni Tunggal Panaluan, Panangkok Saring-Saring tu Tambak na Timbo (1983), and others. In addition, he also composed songs using a rhythmic cha-cha beat.

In addition to Mandailing Angkola's literary language, the growth of Malay-language Indonesian literature adopting local color: for example, the novel Azab dan Sengsara (1921) written by Merari Siregar. This novel includes contextual customs and cultures such as forced marriage, inheritance, kinship relations, and the local traditions of Mandailing-Angkola.

=== Contemporary ===
Contemporary Mandailing literature is no longer developed since pre-independence, as the changing national education curriculum using the national language by itself erodes the use of Mandailing languages.

=== Entertainment ===
Lyrics and musical dramas in the Mandailing language include:

- The musical drama of the 1970s in a tape cassette recorder.
- The drama Sampuraga namaila marina.
- Mandailing song album in an early VCD fragment.
- Album by Tapsel, Madina, Palas and Paluta.

== Variety ==
Pangaduan Lubis proposes that Mandailing has five registers, each having a distinct vocabulary:

1. Hata somal is the variety of language that is used in everyday life.
2. Hata andung is a form of literary language used in the tradition of mangandung (wailing) at traditional ceremonies of marriage or death.
3. Hata teas dohot jampolak is the kind of language used in quarrels or to berate someone.
4. Hata si baso is a variety of language used specifically by the baso (figure shaman) or datu.
5. Hata parkapur is the kind of language that Mandailing people used in the past when they searched for camphor.

Examples of vocabulary:

English	Indonesian	Hata somal	Hata andung	Hata teas	Hata si baso	Hata parkapur
eye	mata	mata	simanyolong	loncot	-	
betel leaf	daun sirih	burangir	simanggurak	-	situngguk	
tiger	harimau	babiat	-	-	-	ompungi/namaradati

In the past, the Mandailing people also had a particular communication tool or kind of language called Hata bulung-bulung ('foliage language'). This language is not a symbol of sound but uses the leaves of plants as a symbol.

== Numbers ==
English	Indonesian	Mandailing
one	satu	sada
two	dua	dua
three	tiga	tolu
four	empat	opat
five	lima	lima
six	enam	onom
seven	tujuh	pitu
eight	delapan	salapan
nine	sembilan	sambilan
ten	sepuluh	sapulu

== Questions ==
English	Indonesian	Mandailing
what	apa	aha
how	bagaimana	songondia/biadoma
how many	berapa	sadia
where	di mana	idia
where to	kemana	tudia
	dari mana	tingondia/ngundia
	mana	idia
who	siapa	ise
why	mengapa	aso
when	kapan	andigan
wow	kenapa	maoa/mangoa

== Sources ==
- (in English) Adelaar, Alexander, The Austronesian Languages of Asia and Madagascar: A Historical Perspective, The Austronesian Languages of Asia and Madagascar, pp. 1–42, Routledge Language Family Series, Londres: Routledge, 2005, ISBN 0-7007-1286-0
- (in Indonesian) Siregar, Ahmad Samin, Kamus Bahasa Angkola/Mandailing Indonesia, Jakarta: Pusat Pembinaan Dan Pengembangan Bahasa, Departemen Pendidikan Dan Kebudayaan, 1977.
