= Aceh Singkil Regency =

Regency in Aceh, Indonesia

Aceh Singkil Regency Kabupaten Aceh Singkil
- Regency
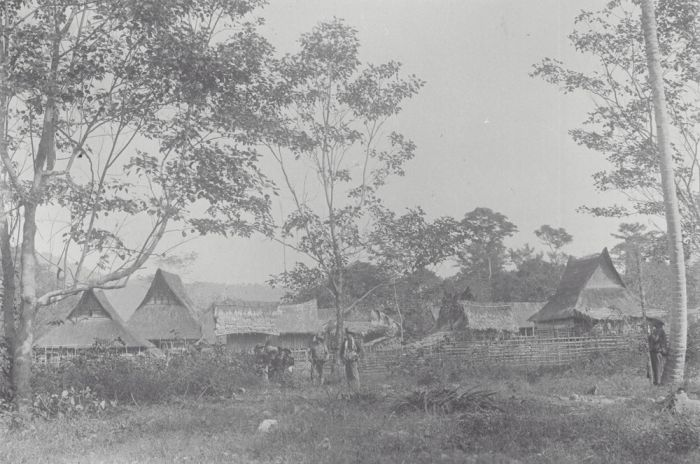

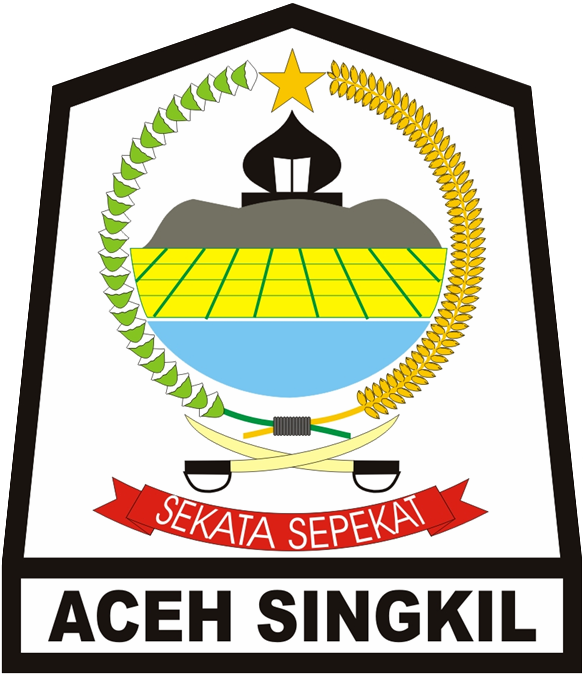
- Seal
- Motto: Sekata Sepekat (Agree)
- Location within Aceh

- Location in Northern Sumatra, Sumatra and Indonesia Aceh Singkil Regency (Sumatra) Aceh Singkil Regency (Indonesia)
- Coordinates: 2°20′N 97°40′E
- Country: Indonesia
- Region: Sumatra
- Province: Aceh
- Established: 1999
- Regency seat: Singkil

Government
  - Regent: Safriadi Manik
  - Vice Regent: Hamzah Sulaiman

Area
  - Total: 1,857.88 km^{2} (717.33 sq mi)

Population (mid 2025 estimate)
  - Total: 138,070
  - Density: 74.316/km^{2} (192.48/sq mi)
- Time zone: UTC+7 (IWST)
- Area code: (+62) 658
- Website: acehsingkilkab.go.id

Aceh Singkil Regency (Indonesian: Kabupaten Aceh Singkil) is a regency in the Aceh province of Indonesia. It is situated largely on the island of Sumatra, but also includes the offshore Banyak Islands, the largest of which is Tuangku (Great Banyak), with the principal town of Alaban. The regency was created on 20 April 1999 from the former southern districts of South Aceh Regency. Until 2007 it included the large town of Subulussalam, but on 2 January 2007 that town was split off in turn to become an autonomous city. It is now bounded to the north by South Aceh Regency and the city of Subulussalam, to the east by North Sumatra Province, and to the south and west by the Indian Ocean. The seat of the Aceh Singkil Regency government is at the port of Singkil on the Sumatra coast. The Regency now covers an area of 1,857.88 km^{2}, and had a population of 102,509 at the 2010 Census, rising to 114,326 at the 2015 Census and to 126,514 at the 2020 Census; the official estimate as of mid 2025 was 138,070 (comprising 69,770 males and 68,300 females).

== Administrative divisions ==
At the time of the 2010 Census, the regency was divided administratively into ten districts (kecamatan). Subsequent to 2010, the Banjak Islands District was divided into two, with a new Western Banjak Islands District (Kecamatan Pulau Banjak Barat) comprising Tuangku and Bangkaru Islands being carved out of the existing district, the residual district now essentially restricted to the numerous small islands situated between Tuangku and the coast of Singkil. The districts are listed below with their areas and their populations at the 2010 Census and the 2020 Census, together with the official estimates as of mid 2025. The table also includes the locations of the district administrative centres, the number of villages (all classed as gampong, and grouped into 16 mukim) and the number of offshore islands in each district, and its post code.

Kode Wilayah	Name of District (kecamatan)	Area in km^{2}	Pop'n Census 2010	Pop'n Census 2020	Pop'n Estimate mid 2025	Admin centre	No. of villages (gampong)	No. of offshore islands	Post code
11.10.01	Pulau Banyak ^{(a)} (Banyak Islands)	15.02	6,570	4,562	4,837	Pulau Balai	3	73	24791
11.10.16	Pulau Banyak Barat ^{(b)} (Western Banyak Islands)	278.63	^{(c)}	3,078	3,256	Haloban	4	2	24790
	(Banyak Islands)	293.65	6,570	7,640	8,093		7	75	
11.10.04	Singkil	135.94	16,292	19,740	21,331	Pulo Sarok	16	1	24785
11.10.10	Singkil Utara (North Singkil)	142.83	8,918	10,533	11,242	Ketapang Indah	7	1	24791
11.10.14	Kuala Baru	45.83	2,173	2,555	2,721	Kuala Baru	4	-	24789
11.10.02	Simpang Kanan	289.96	12,716	15,748	17,198	Lipat Kajang	25	-	24794
11.10.06	Gunung Meriah	224.30	30,630	39,557	44,086	Rimo	25	-	24793
11.10.11	Danau Paris (Lake Paris)	206.04	6,622	7,883	8,446	Biskang	6	-	24784
11.10.12	Suro (Suro Makmur)	127.60	7,559	8,989	9,623	Bulusema	11	-	24787
11.10.13	Singkohor	159.63	5,309	7,265	8,327	Singkohor	6	-	24788
11.10.09	Kota Baharu	232.69	5,720	6,606	7,003	Danau Bungara	9	1	24792
	Totals	1,857.88	102,509	126,514	138,070		116	78	

Note: (a) comprising numerous small islands situated between Tuangku Island and the Sumatran mainland, grouped into the 3 gampong of Pulau Baguk, Pulau Balai and Teluk Nibung.
(b) comprising Tuangku Island (Pulau Tuangku) with the 4 gampong of Haloban, Asantola, Suka Makmur and Ujung Sialit, together with Pulau Bangkaru (which is a state park, to the southwest of Tuangku Island).
(c) The 2010 population of Pulau Banyak Barat District is included in the 2010 figure for Pulau Banyak District, from which it was split out.

== Tourism - Banyak Islands ==
Banyak means "many" because there are 99 islands (75 with names), of which only a few are inhabited. Yachts from Nias Island or directly from abroad carries foreign tourists to Big Palambak Island or Small Palambak Island for fresh water and snorkelling. Tailena Island, Rago-rago Island, Panjang (Long) Island and Matahari (Sun) Island are also suitable for scuba diving, while in Tuangku ("My Master") Island a conservation area for penyu hijau (green sea turtle) and penyu belimbing (leatherback sea turtle) is established.

== See also ==
- List of regencies and cities of Indonesia
