= Batak languages =

Subgroup of Austronesian languages spoken in Indonesia

Batak
- Batakic
- Geographic distribution: Sumatra, Indonesia
- Ethnicity: Batak
- Native speakers: 3.3 million (2010 census)
- Linguistic classification: Austronesian: Malayo-Polynesian; Northwest Sumatra–Barrier Islands; Batak
- Proto-language: Proto-Batak
- Subdivisions: Northern Batak; Southern Batak

Language codes
- ISO 639-2 / 5: btk
- Glottolog: toba1265 Batakic
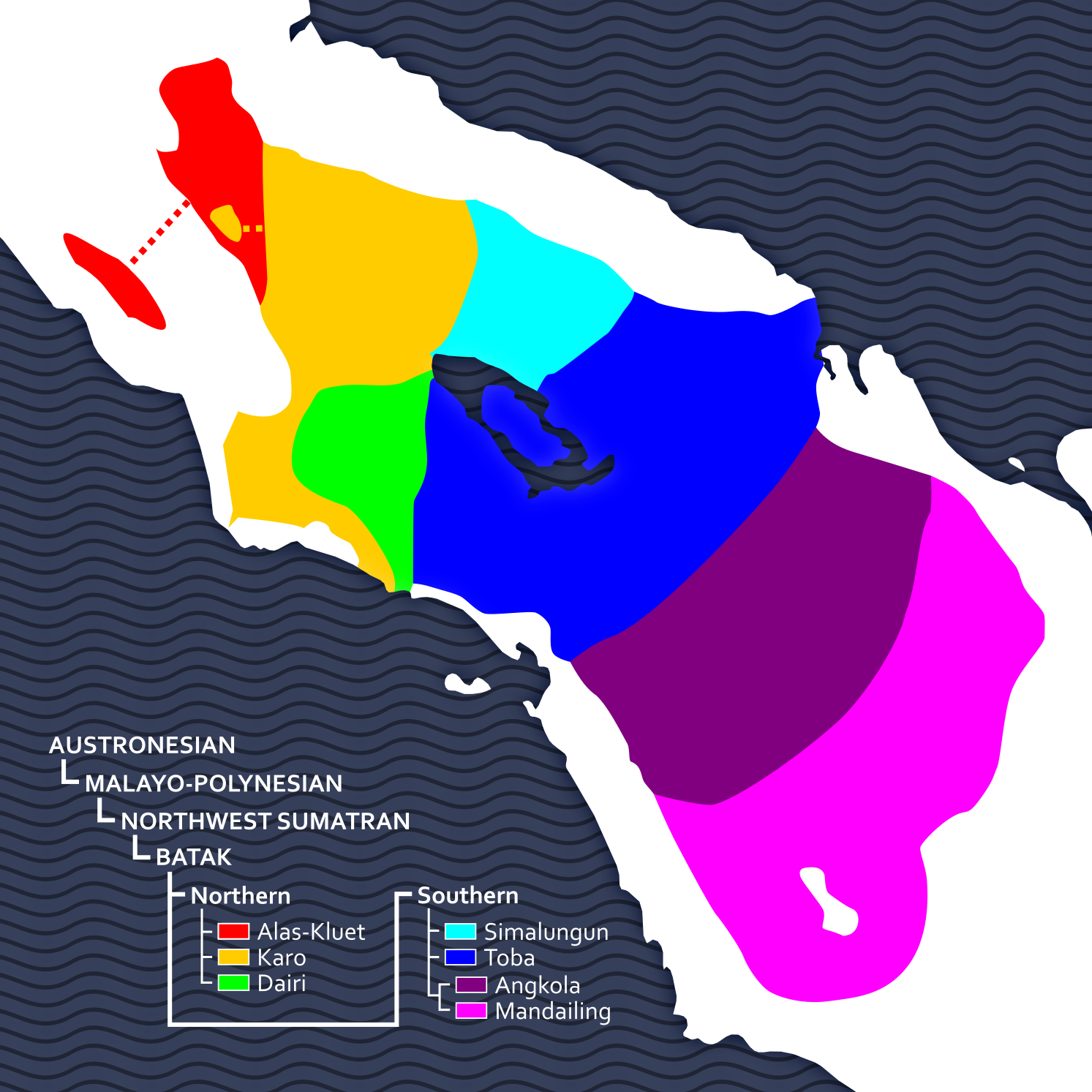
- The distribution of Batak languages in northern Sumatra Interactive map of Batak languages

The Batak languages (/ˈbatək/ BAT-ək) are a subgroup of the Austronesian languages spoken by the Batak people in the Indonesian province of North Sumatra and surrounding areas.

== Internal classification ==
The Batak languages can be divided into two main branches, Northern Batak and Southern Batak. Simalungun was long considered an intermediary, but in current classifications it is recognized as part of the Southern branch. Within Northern Batak, a study noted 80% cognate words between Karo and Alas, 81% with Pakpak, 76% with Simalungun & Toba, and 30% with Malay (Indonesian). Karo and Toba Batak are mutually unintelligible.

- Batak languages
  - Northern
    - Pakpak (Dairi)
    - Karo
    - Alas-Kluet
  - Southern
    - Simalungun
    - - Toba
      - - Angkola
        - Mandailing

Mandailing, Toba and Angkola are related to each other and mutually intelligible. Karo dialects are mutually intelligible with other Northern Batak languages named Alas – Kluet languages in the southern part of Aceh, and are also partially mutually intelligible with Pakpak and Singkil. Some Pakpak (Dairi) dialects are also partially mutually intelligible with Toba dialects. Simalungun dialects are sometimes partially mutually intelligible with both Northern and Southern Batak, but they are more comprehensible with other Southern Batak languages (Toba-Angkola-Mandailing). The geographical influences on the Batak languages can be seen in the map in the infobox; Lake Toba separates the Karo (Northern Batak) from direct contact with the Toba (Southern Batak).

== Reconstruction ==
Proto-Batak
- Reconstruction of: Batak languages
- Reconstructed ancestors: Proto-Austronesian: Proto-Malayo-Polynesian

The Batak languages can be shown to descend from a hypothetical common ancestor, Proto-Batak (which in turn originates from Proto-Austronesian). The sound system of Proto-Batak was reconstructed by Adelaar (1981).

Proto-Batak consonants
		Labial	Alveolar	Palatal	Velar	Glottal
Stop	voiceless	*p	*t	*c	*k	
Stop	voiced	*b	*d	*j	*ɡ	
Fricative				*s		*h
Nasal		*m	*n		*ŋ	
Semivowel		*w		*y		
Lateral			*l			
Trill			*r			

Proto-Batak Vowels
	Front	Central	Back
High	*i		*u
Mid		*ə	
Low		*a	

Final diphthongs: *-uy, *-ey, *-ow.

The Proto-Batak sounds underwent the following changes in the individual daughter languages:

- Proto-Batak *k became h in initial and medial position in the Southern Batak languages:

Proto-Batak *kalak > Toba, Simalungun halak; Karo kalak 'person'
Proto-Batak *dukut > Toba, Simalungun duhut; Karo dukut 'grass'

- Proto-Batak *h was lost in Toba, Angkola and Mandailing:

Proto-Batak *pərəh > Toba poro, Simalungun poroh, Karo pereh /pərəh/ 'wring out'

- Proto-Batak final voiced stops *b, *d, and *g are retained only in Simalungun. In Toba, Angkola and Mandailing, they are unvoiced, while in the Northern Batak languages, they changed to homorganic nasals (/m/, /n/, /ŋ/):

Proto-Batak *dələg > Simalungun dolog, Toba dolok, Karo deleng /dələŋ/ 'mountain'.

- The central vowel *ə is retained in the Northern languages, and shifted to /o/ in the Southern languages:

Proto-Batak *ənəm > Karo enem (/ənəm/), Toba onom 'six'

- Proto-Batak diphthongs are only retained in Simalungun, but shifted to monophthongs in all other Batak languages:

Proto-Batak *apuy > Simalungun apuy; all other languages api 'fire'
Proto-Batak *matey > Simalungun matei; all other languages mate 'dead'
Proto-Batak *pulow > Simalungun pulou; all other languages pulo 'island'

== Writing system ==
Historically, the Batak languages were written using the Batak script, but the Latin script is now used for most writing.

== See also ==
- Horas
