= Subulussalam =

City in Aceh, Indonesia

- City
- City of Subussalam; Kota Subussalam

Other transcription(s)
  - Jawoe: سبل السلام
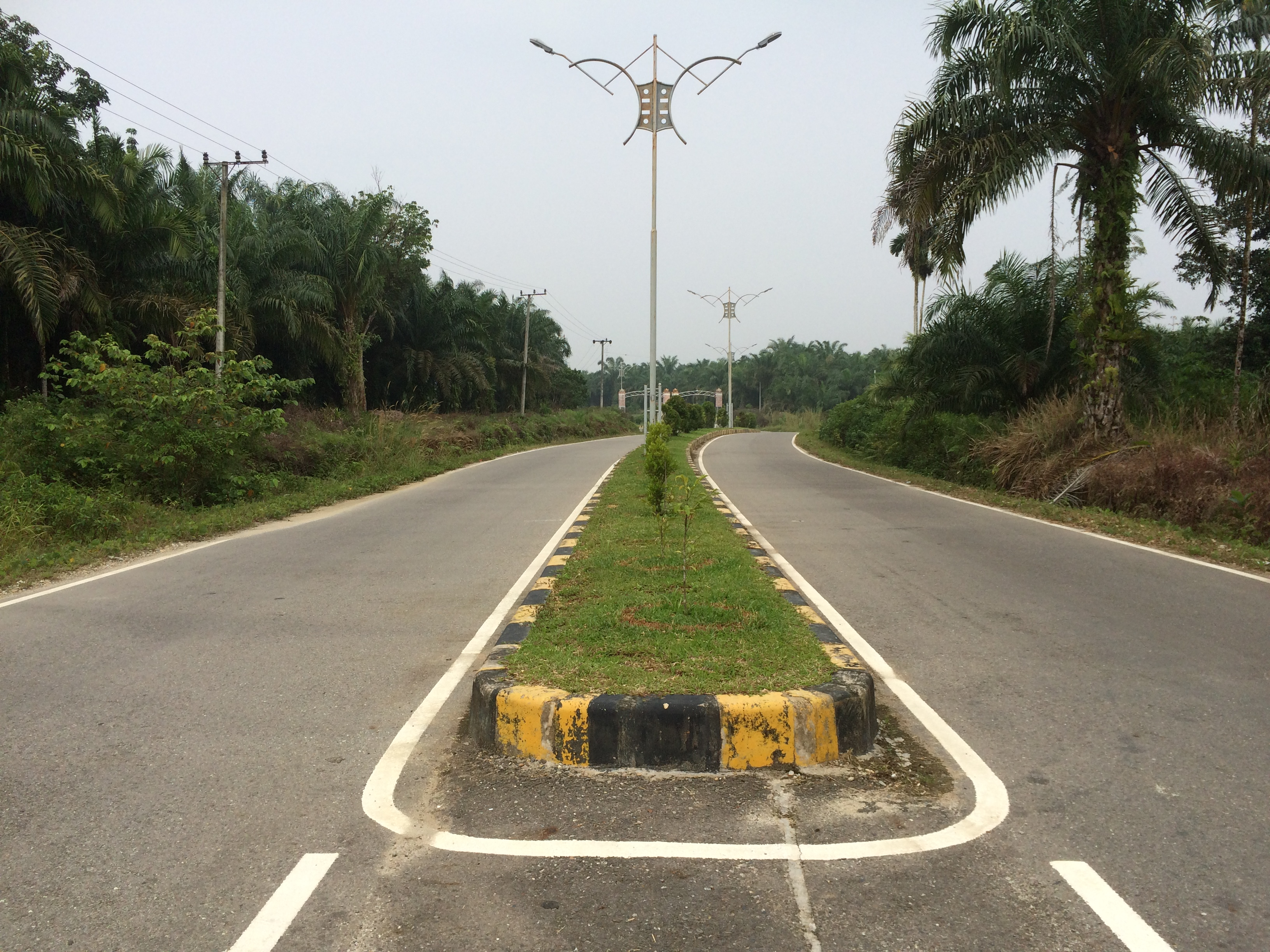
- A road and palm oil plantation in Subulussalam

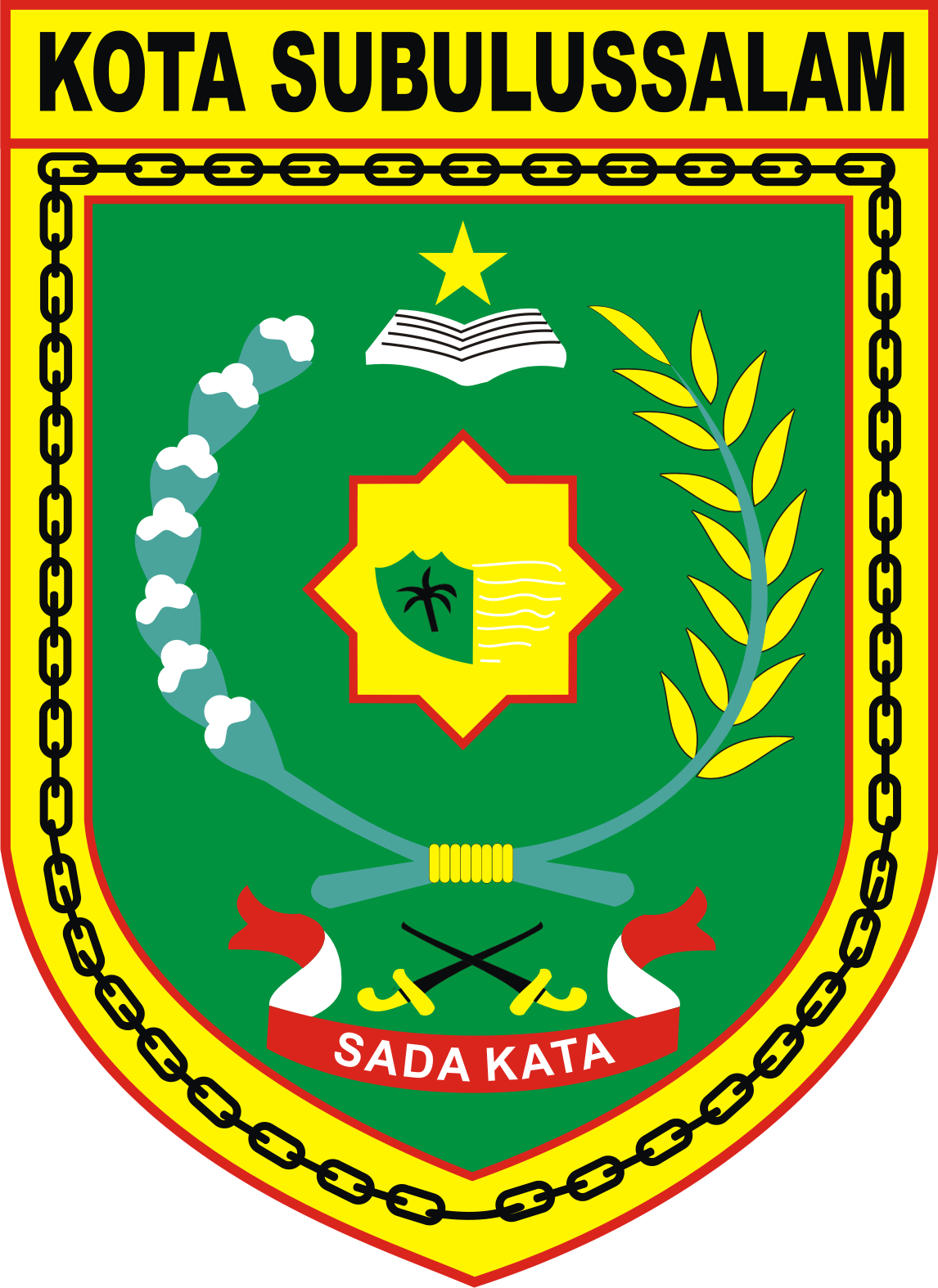
- Coat of arms
- Motto(s): Sada Kata (One Word)
- Location within Aceh

- Location in Northern Sumatra, Sumatra and Indonesia Subulussalam (Sumatra) Subulussalam (Indonesia)
- Coordinates: 2°38′32″N 98°0′15″E
- Country: Indonesia
- Region: Sumatra
- Province: Aceh
- City: 2 January 2007

Government
  - Mayor: Rasyid Bancin
  - Vice Mayor: Nasir Kombih

Area
  - Total: 1,391 km^{2} (537 sq mi)

Population (mid 2025 estimate)
  - Total: 101,282
  - Density: 72.81/km^{2} (188.6/sq mi)
- Time zone: UTC+7 (IWST)
- Area code: (+62) 627
- Website: subulussalamkota.go.id

Subulussalam (Jawoe: سبل السلام) is a city in the south of Aceh province of Indonesia. It is located inland on the island of Sumatra. On 2 January 2007, the provincial government of Aceh declared Subulussalam to be an independent city as a result of the administration being separated from that of Aceh Singkil Regency, of which it was formerly a part. It is located at 2°38′32″N 98°00′15″E. It covers a land area of 1,391 km^{2}, and it had a population of 67,446 at the 2010 Census and of 90,751 at the 2020 Census; the official estimate as at mid 2025 was 101,282 (comprising 51,396 males and 49,886 females). As a result, Subulussalam is the Indonesian city with the most sparse average population, with an overall population density in 2025 of only 72.81 people per km^{2}, and including wide swathes of rural areas; Simpang Kiri District and Penanggalan District are the only districts with urban densities of population.

== Administrative Districts ==
Subulussalam city consists of five administrative districts (kecamatan), tabulated below with their areas and population totals from the 2010 Census and the 2020 Census, together with the official estimates for 2025. The table also includes the number of administrative villages (gampong) in each district, and its postal codes.

Kode Wilayah	Name of District (kecamatan)	Area in km^{2}	Pop'n Census 2010	Pop'n Census 2020	Pop'n Estimate 2025	No. of villages	Post codes
11.75.01	Simpang Kiri	213	27,573	35,886	39,365	17	24781
11.75.02	Penanggalan	93	11,479	16,916	19,704	13	24780
11.75.03	Rundeng	320	10,994	14,142	15,429	23	24779
11.75.04	Sultan Daulat	602	12,960	17,126	18,923	19	24783
11.75.05	Longkib	163	4,440	6,681	7,861	10	24782
	Totals	1,391	67,446	90,751	101,282	82	

== Climate ==
Subulussalam has a tropical rainforest climate (Af) with heavy to very heavy rainfall year-round.

Climate data for Subulussalam
Month	Jan	Feb	Mar	Apr	May	Jun	Jul	Aug	Sep	Oct	Nov	Dec	Year
Mean daily maximum °C (°F)	30.9 (87.6)	31.5 (88.7)	31.8 (89.2)	31.9 (89.4)	32.0 (89.6)	32.1 (89.8)	31.7 (89.1)	31.6 (88.9)	31.0 (87.8)	30.7 (87.3)	30.3 (86.5)	30.4 (86.7)	31.3 (88.4)
Daily mean °C (°F)	26.0 (78.8)	26.3 (79.3)	26.7 (80.1)	26.9 (80.4)	27.0 (80.6)	26.8 (80.2)	26.4 (79.5)	26.4 (79.5)	26.3 (79.3)	26.3 (79.3)	25.9 (78.6)	25.9 (78.6)	26.4 (79.5)
Mean daily minimum °C (°F)	21.2 (70.2)	21.2 (70.2)	21.6 (70.9)	22.0 (71.6)	22.1 (71.8)	21.6 (70.9)	21.2 (70.2)	21.3 (70.3)	21.6 (70.9)	21.9 (71.4)	21.6 (70.9)	21.5 (70.7)	21.6 (70.8)
Average rainfall mm (inches)	246 (9.7)	212 (8.3)	274 (10.8)	344 (13.5)	250 (9.8)	172 (6.8)	179 (7.0)	250 (9.8)	250 (9.8)	366 (14.4)	365 (14.4)	305 (12.0)	3,213 (126.3)
Source: Climate-Data.org

== See also ==
- List of regencies and cities of Indonesia
