= Oesman Sapta Odang =

Indonesian politician

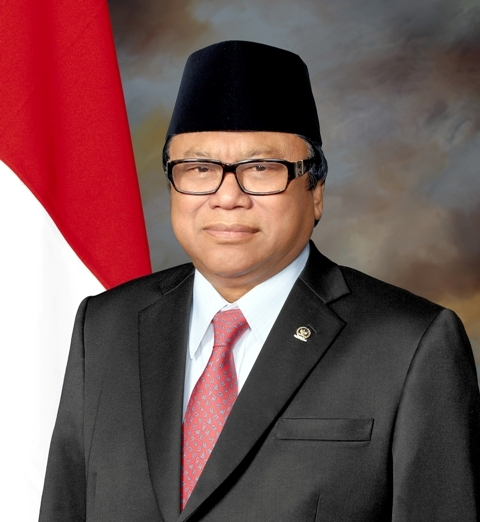
- Official portrait, 2014

4th Speaker of the Senate of Indonesia
- In office 4 April 2017 – 1 October 2019
- Preceded by: Mohammad Saleh
- Succeeded by: La Nyalla Mattalitti

Deputy Speaker of the People's Consultative Assembly
- In office 8 October 2014 – 1 October 2019 Serving with 6 other people
- Speaker: Zulkifli Hasan
- In office 11 August 2002 – 1 October 2004 Serving with 7 other people
- Speaker: Amien Rais

2nd General Chairman of the People's Conscience Party
- Incumbent
- Assumed office 22 December 2016
- Preceded by: Wiranto

Personal details
- Born: 18 August 1950 (age 75) Sukadana, Indonesia
- Party: Hanura
- Other political affiliations: PPD (2002–2010); PPN (2011–2016)
- Spouse: Serviaty Oesman
- Children: Raja Sapta Sermando; Raja Sapta Oktohari; Raja Sapta Aji; Raja Sapta Ervian; Putri Selaras Oesman
- Parents: Odang (father); Asnah Hamid (mother)
- Occupation: Politician

Oesman Sapta Odang (born 18 August 1950) is an Indonesian politician of the People's Conscience Party (Hanura), who served as the speaker of the Regional Representative Council and deputy speaker of the People's Consultative Assembly between 2014 and 2019. He had also served in the latter position between 2002 and 2004.

Originating from the town of Sukadana in West Kalimantan, he built a career as a businessman before entering politics, founding the Regional Unity Party and later joining Hanura, where he has served as chairman since December 2016.

== Personal life ==
Oesman, often nicknamed OSO, was born in the town of Sukadana in West Kalimantan province on 18 August 1950 to parents from other parts of Indonesia. His father Odang originated from Palopo while his mother Asnah Hamid was of Minang descent, originating from Solok. As a child, he worked on rubber plantations and as a cigarette vendor. He did not complete formal education, and only earned his high school degree through a special package ("Paket C") in 2006 at the age of 56.

He obtained an honoris causa degree from the now-defunct Rutherford University in 1999. He competed as a racing car driver in the 1980s, winning national and international level competitions.

=== Family ===
He is married to Serviaty Oesman and the couple has five children, Raja Sapta Sermando, Raja Sapta Oktohari, Raja Sapta Aji, Raja Sapta Aji, and Putri Selaras Oesman.

In 2015, his eldest son Raja Septa Sermando died at the age of 41 due to a heart attack.

== Career ==
He began his business career by trading agricultural commodities such as coconut and ginger between West Kalimantan and Jakarta. At the age of 22, he moved on to the construction industry. As his business grew, he expanded to other sectors, forming the Oso Group. In 2012, he resigned as CEO of the group.

In 2002, he reported his wealth to the Corruption Eradication Commission as Rp 54.6 billion (US$6 million). GlobeAsia placed him on its list of 150 richest Indonesians, placing him 103rd with estimated wealth of US$350 million. According to an official report to the Indonesian government, his wealth amounted to Rp 335.6 billion in April 2015.

=== Politics ===
He became a member of the People's Consultative Assembly (MPR) for the 1999–2004 period, and was appointed deputy speaker of the body on 11 August 2002. He was part of the regional envoys' faction. Following this, he founded the Regional Unity Party on 18 November 2002 and it participated in the 2004 elections, but only gathered 0.58 percent of votes and failed to secure seats in the People's Representative Council (DPR). The party achieved similar results in the 2009 elections, and merged with nine other minor political parties to form the National Unity Party. He attempted to run as governor of West Kalimantan in the 2007 gubernatorial elections, but placed last out of three candidates behind winner Cornelis and incumbent Usman Ja'far.

Following the 2014 election, he was elected into the Regional Representative Council (DPD) as a senator from West Kalimantan, winning 188,528 votes. He was chosen as a deputy speaker for the MPR on 8 October 2014 for the 2014–2019 period. On 22 December 2016, he was elected chairman of Hanura for 2016–2020, replacing Wiranto.

He was elected DPD speaker in April 2017 following the expiry of Bengkulu senator Mohammad Saleh's appointment. His appointment received criticism, since Oesman then held two major parliamentary positions in addition to being chairman in Hanura. According to speaker Zulkifli Hasan, Oesman would resign from the deputy speaker position. It was not until February 2018 however that he submitted his resignation. His replacement was left for the Regional Representative Council to decide.

In January 2018, Hanura Secretary General Sarifuddin Sudding (id) gave him a motion of no confidence. Oesman fired him from the party in response. Deputy chairman of Hanura Wishnu Dewanto said Oesman had violated the party's internal procedures and caused Hanura's popularity to decline. Some others accused him of embezzling Rp 200 billion (US$15 million) of party funds. Following the split, multiple members holding positions in the People's Representative Council were replaced with Hanura legislators in Oesman's faction. The other faction moved to support candidates not initially endorsed by the party in the 2018 regional elections, such as in East Java.

Oesman has proposed Wiranto as incumbent President Joko Widodo's running mate in the 2019 elections. He was set to run for reelection, but the General Elections Commission removed his name from the ballot as he was still affiliated to political parties.
