= 1st Mechanized Infantry Brigade (Indonesia) =

1st Infantry Brigade
- Brigade Infanteri Mekanis 1 Pengaman Ibukota/Jaya Sakti
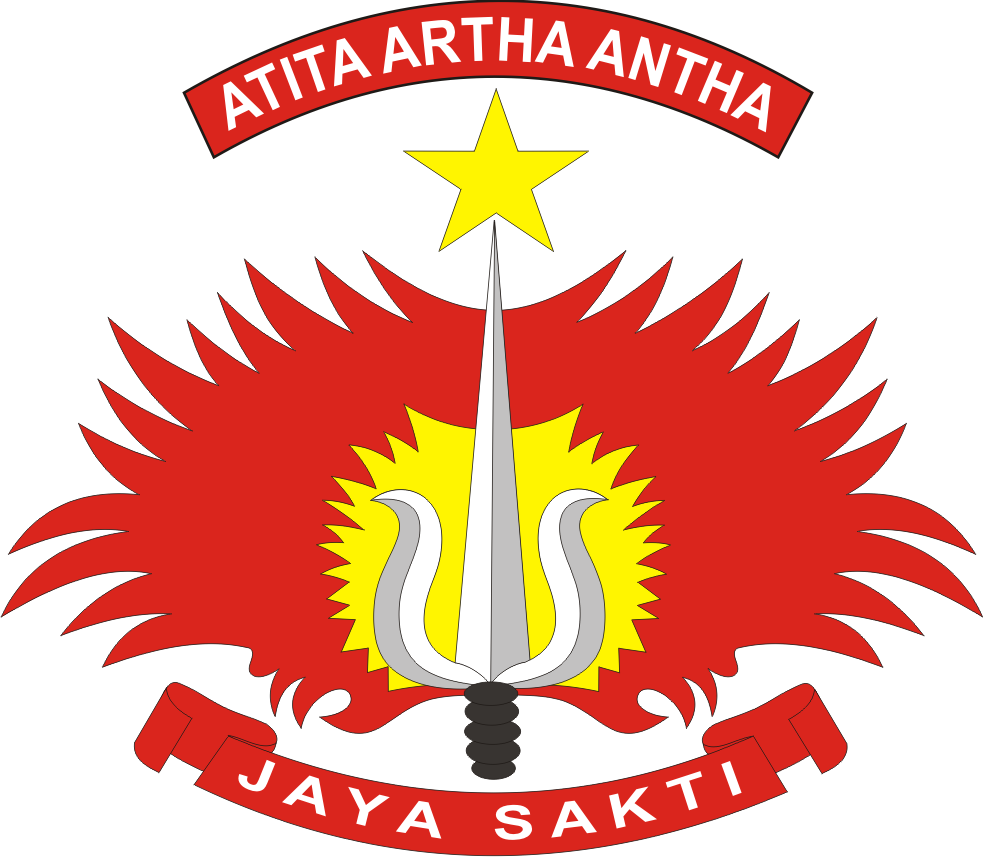
- Logo of the 1st Infantry Brigade
- Founded: 27 December 1963
- Branch: Indonesian Army
- Part of: Kodam Jayakarta
- Garrison/HQ: Pasar Rebo, East Jakarta
- Nickname: Brigif 1/JS

The 1st Mechanized Infantry Brigade (Indonesian: Brigade Infanteri Mekanis 1 Pengaman Ibukota/Jaya Sakti; abbr. Brigif Mekanis-1 PIK/JS) is a mechanized infantry brigade of the Indonesian Army, part of the Jayakarta Military Command. Founded in 1963, it is responsible for the security of the Jakarta region and is based in Pasar Rebo in East Jakarta.

== History ==
The brigade was formed as the 1st Infantry Brigade on 27 December 1963 as an organic unit of Kodam Jayakarta, comprising initially of three infantry battalions (201st, 202nd, and 203rd, the latter two transferred from Siliwangi). In 1965, the brigade's commander Col. Abdul Latief was part of a conspiracy to kidnap a number of generals in a putsch (which Latief later claimed was an attempt to prevent a coup d'etat). Elements of the brigade would take part in the kidnapping of the generals, numbering a little more than a company. The attempt failed, and Latief was arrested and sentenced to life in prison.

Its designation was changed to a light infantry brigade in 1975. The 201st and 202nd battalions of the brigade took part in combat operations in East Timor in 1979. In the immediate aftermath of the resignation of president Suharto in 1998, the brigade was deployed around Suharto's house to block any attempts by mobs to attack his home. One such attempt took place on 19 November 1998, but the brigade's blockade prevented the 8,000-strong crowd from reaching Suharto's home.

On 22 November 2016, the brigade officially became a mechanized infantry unit, and received a name change to the 1st Mechanized Infantry Brigade.

== Organization ==
As of 2025, the brigade is designated as a mechanized infantry brigade and is explicitly tasked with the security of the Jakarta Capital Region. It is headquartered in Kalisari subdistrict, Pasar Rebo, East Jakarta, and has command over the following subunits:

- 1st Mechanized Infantry Brigade
  - 201st Mechanized Infantry Battalion – based in Gandaria, Kebayoran Lama, East Jakarta
  - 202nd Mechanized Infantry Battalion – based in Rawalumbu, Bekasi
  - 203rd Mechanized Infantry Battalion – based in Jatiuwung, Tangerang
  - Security Reconnaissance Platoon – special platoon often detached to the Presidential Security Force during major events
  - Headquarters unit
    - Protocol company – special company tasked with ceremonial duties such as raising and lowering of the Indonesian flag during state events

The brigade also used to contain a cavalry battalion, the 9th Cavalry Battalion, but it was transferred to the newly formed 1st Cavalry Brigade upon its formation in 2021.

=== Equipment ===
The brigade uses the Anoa armoured personnel carrier.

== Notable members ==
- Soedjiman – commander (1969–1970), later became Governor of West Kalimantan
- Haris Sudarno – commander (1985–1987), later became commander of Kodam V/Brawijaya and member of the House of Representatives
- Fachrul Razi – commander (1990–1992), later became Deputy Commander of the Indonesian National Armed Forces and Minister of Religious Affairs
- Moeldoko – commander (1999–?), later became Commander of the Indonesian National Armed Forces and Presidential Chief of Staff
- Gatot Nurmantyo – commander (2001–2003), later became Commander of the Indonesian National Armed Forces
- Agus Harimurti Yudhoyono – 203rd battalion commander, later Chairman of the Democratic Party, Coordinating Minister for Infrastructure and Regional Development, and Minister of Agrarian Affairs and Spatial Planning
