= Bonar Sianturi =

Indonesian military officer (1944–2022)

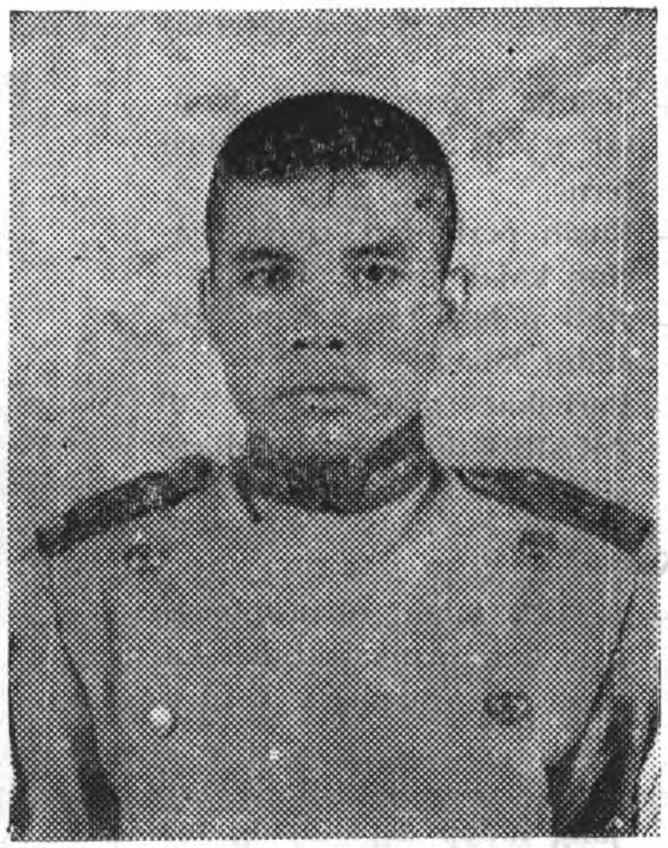
- Sianturi as a cadet in the National Military Academy, 1968

Regent of Sintang
- In office 27 March 1989 – 5 April 1994
- Governor: Parjoko Suryokusumo; Aspar Aswin
- Preceded by: Daniel Toding
- Succeeded by: Abdillah Kamarullah

Personal details
- Born: 18 June 1944 Sidikalang, Sumatra, Japanese-occupied Dutch East Indies
- Died: 22 May 2022 (aged 77) Gatot Soebroto Army Hospital, Jakarta, Indonesia
- Spouse: Lambok Royana Hutabarat (m. 1971)
- Children: 3

Military service
- Allegiance: Indonesia
- Branch/service: Indonesian Army
- Years of service: 1968—1999
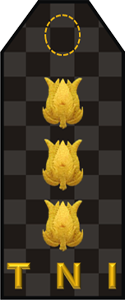
- Rank: Colonel
- Unit: Infantry

Bonar Sianturi (18 June 1944 – 22 May 2022) was an Indonesian military officer who served as the Regent of Sintang in West Kalimantan from 1989 to 1994. Previously, he served as the commander of the Sanggau Military District from 1986 until 1989.

== Early life and military career ==
Sianturi was born on 18 June 1944 in Sidikalang in Sumatra. After three years of studying machinery in Balige, Sianturi entered the National Military Academy in 1965, from which he graduated in 1968. His first assignment in the military was as a platoon commander in the 328th Infantry Battalion. He rose through the ranks and became the commander of the 623rd Infantry Battalion in Banjarbaru from 1985 to 1986 and commander of the Sanggau Military District until his election as regent in 1989.

== Regent of Sintang ==
Sianturi was elected as the Regent of Sintang in a parliamentary election held by the local council on 14 March 1989. In the election, Bonar obtained 25 out of the 34 votes cast, defeating the two other candidates. He was installed on 27 March by the governor.

During Sianturi's term as regent, the government sponsored the construction of elementary schools in impoverished and secluded areas of the region. Most of these schools were constructed by Muslim and Christian education foundations. At a speech in front of the Sintang council in 1991, Sianturi stated that the government has provided a budget of about one and a half billion rupiah for the development of education and culture. The government also managed to upgrade the status of the Dharma Bakti Teacher's Academy—at that time the only higher education in the region—into a full-fledged university. The university, which was named the Kapuas University, was inaugurated on 17 June 1992.

Sianturi also initiated road repairs and the construction of a connecting bridge between the Tebelian and Nanga Pinoh subdistrict. He commissioned the Eva Kalbar company for the project, but the company failed to finish the project in a timely manner. He later transferred the project to a different company and allocated a budget of three billion rupiahs for the completion of the project.

Towards the end of Sianturi's term, the government nominated Dayak bureaucrat L.H. Kadir to replace Sianturi, and put forward the Malay Abdillah Kamarullah and Abdul Hadi Karsoem as puppet candidates in the elections. Unexpectedly, Abdillah Kamarullah won the election, angering Dayak politicians inside the council. Dayak politicians lobbied the central government to use their veto powers to cancel the election results, but to no avail. On the other side, the Malays consider the election of Kamarullah as fair and lauded the council for electing a popular candidate instead of a pre-determined government candidate. As a result of this dispute, the government briefly extended Sianturi's term in order to ease tensions between the supporters of Kamarullah and Kadir. Sianturi was officially replaced by Kamarullah on 5 April 1994.

== Later life ==
Sianturi retired from the military on 18 June 1999. Sianturi died at the Gatot Soebroto Army Hospital in Jakarta on the evening of 22 May 2022.
