= 1st Cavalry Brigade (Indonesia) =

- Brigade Kavaleri 1/Limpung Alugoro
- Founded: 14 October 2021
- Country: Indonesia
- Branch: Indonesian Army
- Type: Armoured cavalry
- Part of: Kodam Jaya
- Garrison/HQ: Serpong, South Tangerang

The 1st Cavalry Brigade (Indonesian: Brigade Kavaleri 1/Limpung Alugoro; abbr. Brigkav 1/LA) is an armoured cavalry brigade of the Indonesian Army, part of the Jayakarta Military Command. It was initially active from 1963 to 1985 as a part of Kostrad, and it was reactivated in 2021. It consists of two cavalry battalions.

== History ==
=== Kostrad unit ===
The 1st Cavalry Brigade was initially established on 10 November 1963, and on 27 February it was integrated as a part of Kostrad, with the strength of one tank battalion, one mechanized infantry battalion, and a field artillery battery supported by army aviators. It was headquartered in Bandung, West Java.

One company from its mechanized infantry battalion took part in army operations in the immediate aftermath of the 30 September movement, conducting maneuvers across Jakarta to distract Indonesian Air Force personnel and allowing other units to occupy Halim Air Base. The brigade proceeded to take part in operations against PKI members and alleged members in Jakarta and Central Java. On 18 March 1985, the brigade was dissolved and its constituent battalions were absorbed into its parent unit, the Kostrad 1st Infantry Division.

=== Kodam Jaya ===
Starting in 2018, the brigade was recreated, and it was officially inaugurated by Army Chief of Staff Andika Perkasa on 14 October 2021 as a combat unit under Kodam Jayakarta. Its new headquarters were established on a 8.2-hectare plot in Serpong, South Tangerang, and the brigade had two battalions: the 7th and 9th Cavalry Battalions. It was the only cavalry brigade in the Indonesian Army upon its reestablishment.

== Organization ==
As of 2025, the brigade has command over the following subunits:

- 1st Cavalry Brigade
  - 7th Cavalry Battalion – Based in Cijantung, Pasar Rebo, East Jakarta.
  - 9th Cavalry Battalion – Based in Serpong, South Tangerang. Formerly part of the 1st Mechanized Infantry Brigade.
  - Headquarters unit – 316 personnel as of October 2021.
    - Signal Company
    - Maintenance Company
