= Sianturi =

Batak surname originating in Indonesia

Sianturi is one of Toba Batak clans originating in North Sumatra, Indonesia. People of this clan bear the clan's name as their surname. Notable people of this clan include:

- Azhar Levi Sianturi, Indonesian musician
- Bonar Sianturi (1944-2022), Indonesian politician and military officer
- Kristomei Sianturi (born 1976), Indonesian army general
- Ronnie Sianturi (born 1965), Indonesian singer and actor
