= 11th Combat Engineer Battalion (Indonesia) =

- Batalyon Zeni Tempur 11/Durdhaga Wighra
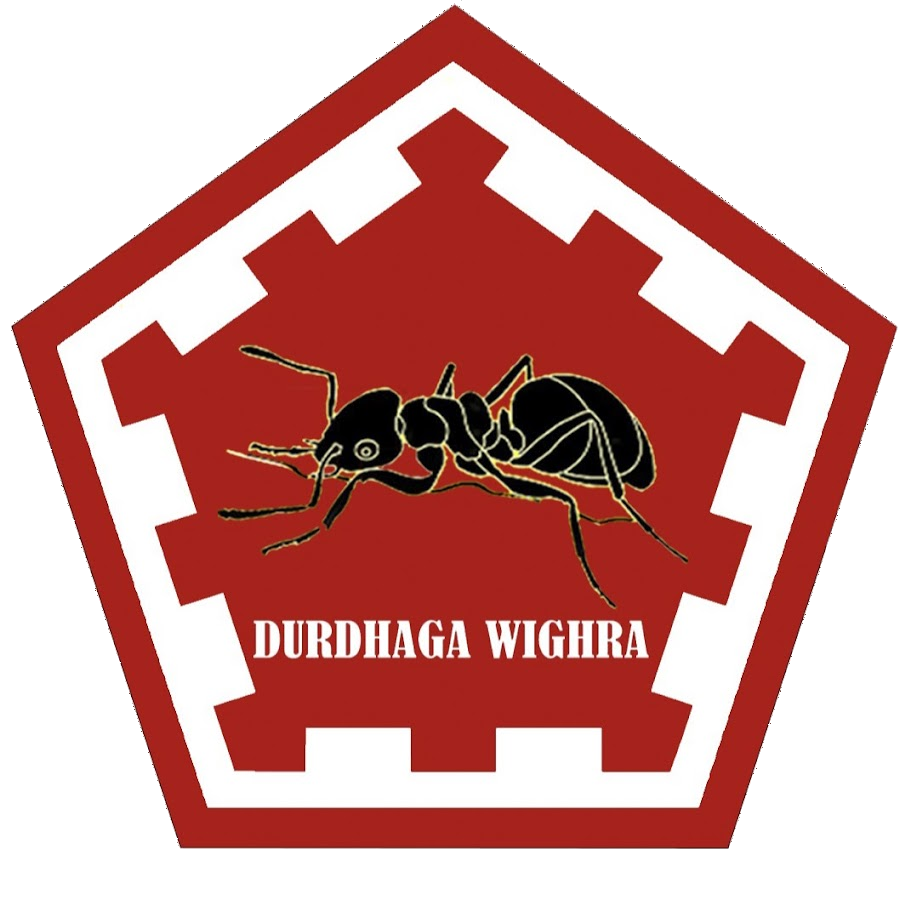
- Founded: 13 June 1959
- Country: Indonesia
- Branch: Indonesian Army
- Type: Combat engineer
- Part of: Kodam Jaya
- Garrison/HQ: Matraman, East Jakarta

The 11th Combat Engineer Battalion (Indonesian: Batalyon Zeni Tempur 11/Durdhaga Wighra, abbr. Yonzipur 11/DW) is a combat engineer battalion of the Indonesian Army. It has been part of the Jayakarta Military Command since 2020, having initially been founded as a Kostrad unit before its absorption into the Indonesian Army Corps of Engineers.

== History ==
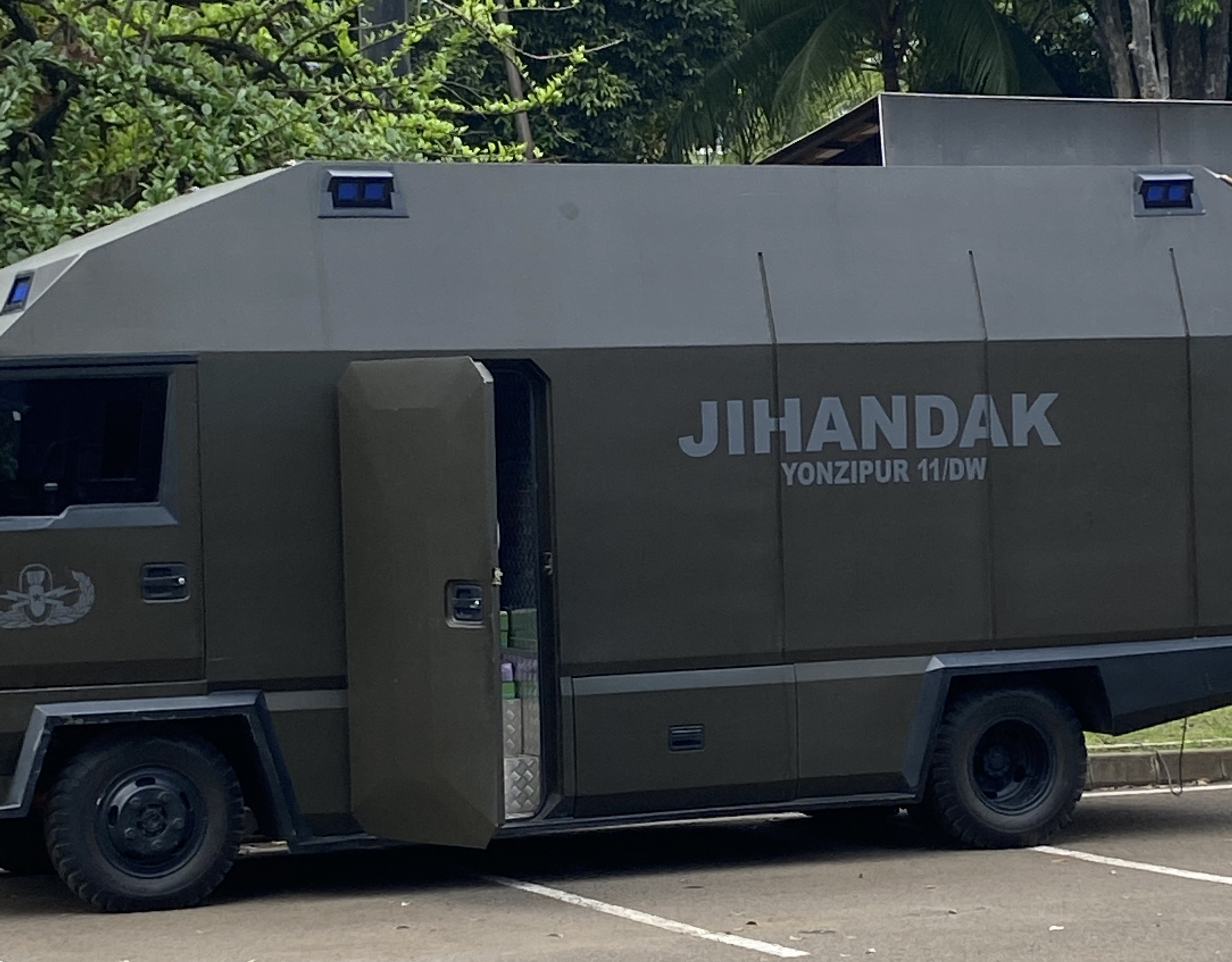
An EOD truck of the 11th Battalion.

The battalion was established on 13 June 1959. It was initially part of Kostrad, and had been established in preparation for Operation Trikora (the Indonesian military operation against Netherlands New Guinea). In November 1963, the battalion was transferred to the Indonesian Army Corps of Engineers and was renamed the 11th Construction Engineer Battalion. It took part in operations against suspected Indonesian Communist Party members and later in the Indonesian invasion of East Timor.

The battalion was transferred to Kodam Jaya on 23 October 2020, becoming the military command's first combat engineer battalion in its 71-year history. Kodam Jaya commander Dudung Abdurachman cited the need for the battalion's bomb disposal capabilities as a reason for his efforts to incorporate the battalion into Kodam Jaya. By 2021, the battalion had been designated as a Combat Engineer battalion. It is headquartered in Matraman, East Jakarta.

In 2022, troops from the battalion formed the core engineering unit of the Indonesian peacekeeping mission in the Democratic Republic of the Congo (MONUSCO), with a company-sized detachment from Yonzipur 11 out of the 175 participating engineering personnel. The unit has taken part in disaster reconstruction in Greater Jakarta and in emergency response – such as an ammunition warehouse fire in 2024.
