= List of governors of West Kalimantan =

Governor of West Kalimantan
- Coat of arms of the Province

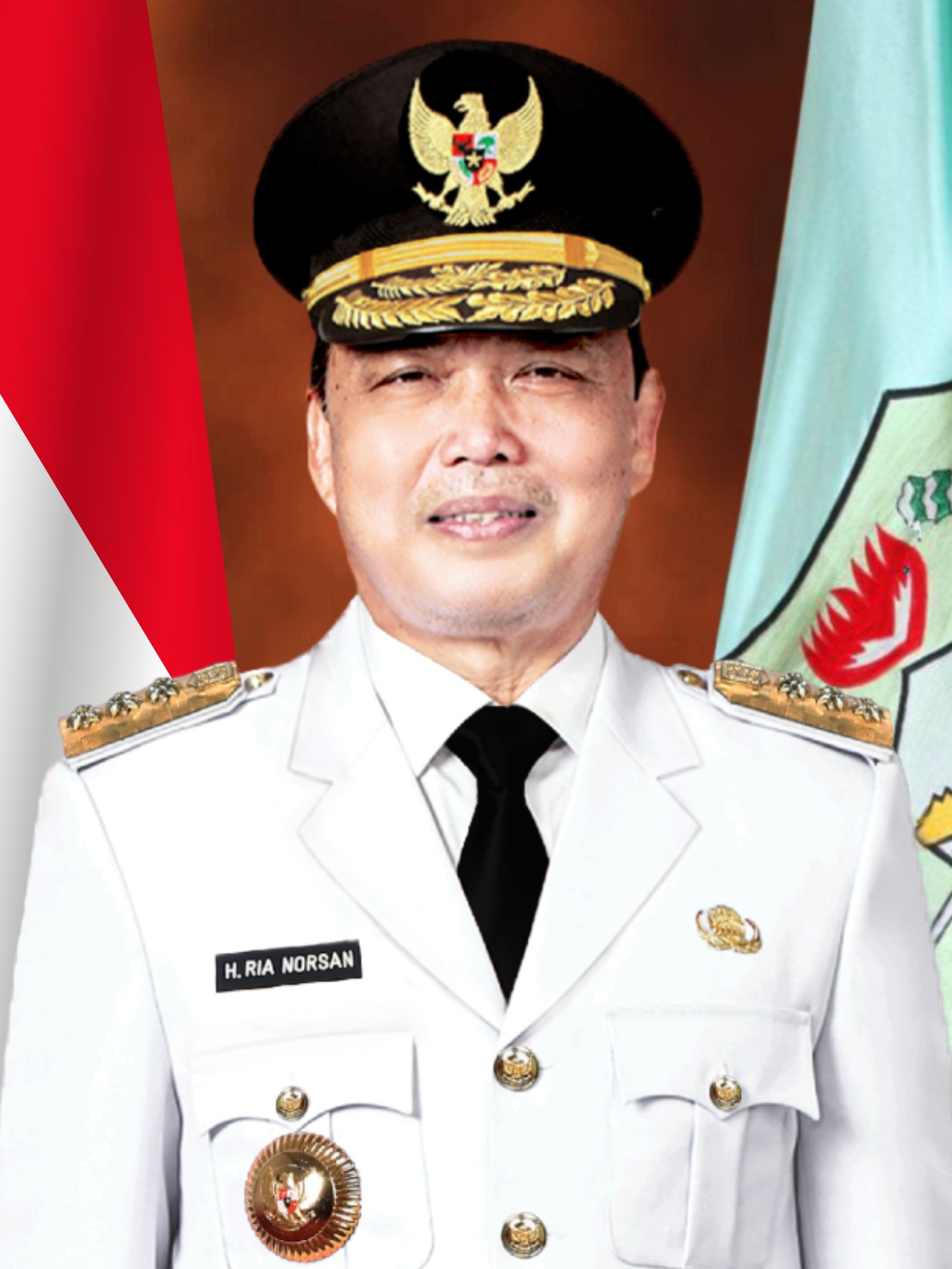
- Incumbent; Ria Norsan since 20 February 2025
- Style: His/Her Excellency
- Residence: Jalan Ahmad Yani, Pontianak
- Term length: Five years
- Inaugural holder: Adji Pangeran Afloes
- Formation: 1957
- Deputy: Vacant
- Website: www.kalbarprov.go.id

This is the list of the governors of West Kalimantan, a province in Indonesia.

#	Photo	Name	Took office	Left office	Remarks	Deputy Governor
–		Adji Pangeran Afloes (Acting)	1957	1958		
–		Djenal Asikin Judadibrata (Acting)	1958	1960		
1		Johanes Chrisostomus; Oevaang Oeray	1960	1966		
2		Soemadi	1967	1972		
3		Kadarusno	1972	1977		
4		Soedjiman	1977	1982		
4		Soedjiman	1982	1987		
5		Parjoko Suryokusumo	1987	1993		
6		Aspar Aswin	1993	1998		
6		Aspar Aswin	1998	13 January 2003		
7		Usman Ja'far	13 Januari 2003	14 Januari 2008		Laurentius Herman Kadir
8		Cornelis	14 January 2008	14 January 2013	First Governor elected directly by the people	Christiandy Sanjaya
8		Cornelis	14 January 2013	14 January 2018		Christiandy Sanjaya
—		Doddy Riyadmadji (Acting)	15 January 2018	5 September 2018		-
9		Sutarmidji	5 September 2018	5 September 2023	12 (2018)	Ria Norsan
—		Harison Az-roi (Acting)	5 September 2023	20 February 2025		-
10		Ria Norsan	20 February 2025	Incumbent	13 (2024)	Krisantus Kurniawan
