= 1st Air Defense Artillery Regiment (Indonesia) =

- Resimen Artileri Pertahanan Udara 1/Faletehan
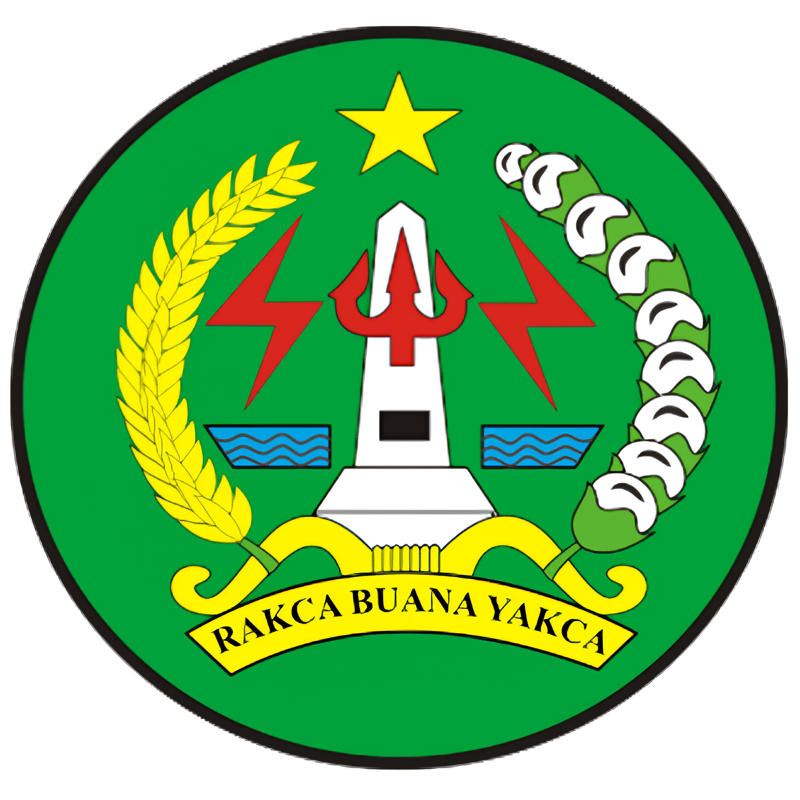
- Founded: 13 August 1966
- Country: Indonesia
- Branch: Indonesian Army
- Type: Air defense artillery
- Part of: Kodam Jaya
- Garrison/HQ: Bintaro, South Jakarta
- Website: menarhanud1.tni-ad.mil.id

The 1st Air Defense Artillery Regiment (Indonesian: Resimen Artileri Pertahanan Udara 1/Faletehan; abbr. Menarhanud 1/F) is an air defense regiment of the Indonesian Army under the command of Kodam Jaya. It was founded in 1966 initially as a brigade. It is based in Bintaro in South Jakarta, and contains two battalions and a missile unit.

== History ==
Jakarta's Kodam Jaya had contained an organic air defense unit by 1962 in the form of three battalions (two transferred from Lumajang) and two radar stations. The overall air defense unit was formed on 13 August 1966 as the 1st Air Defense Brigade, which was redesignated as the 1st Air Defense Artillery Regiment on 23 March 1968, containing three air defense battalions and two radar detachments. One of its battalions was transferred to the Kostrad 1st Infantry Division in 1978.

It was initially based in Tanjung Priok, but was relocated to Bintaro in South Jakarta in 2004.

== Organization ==
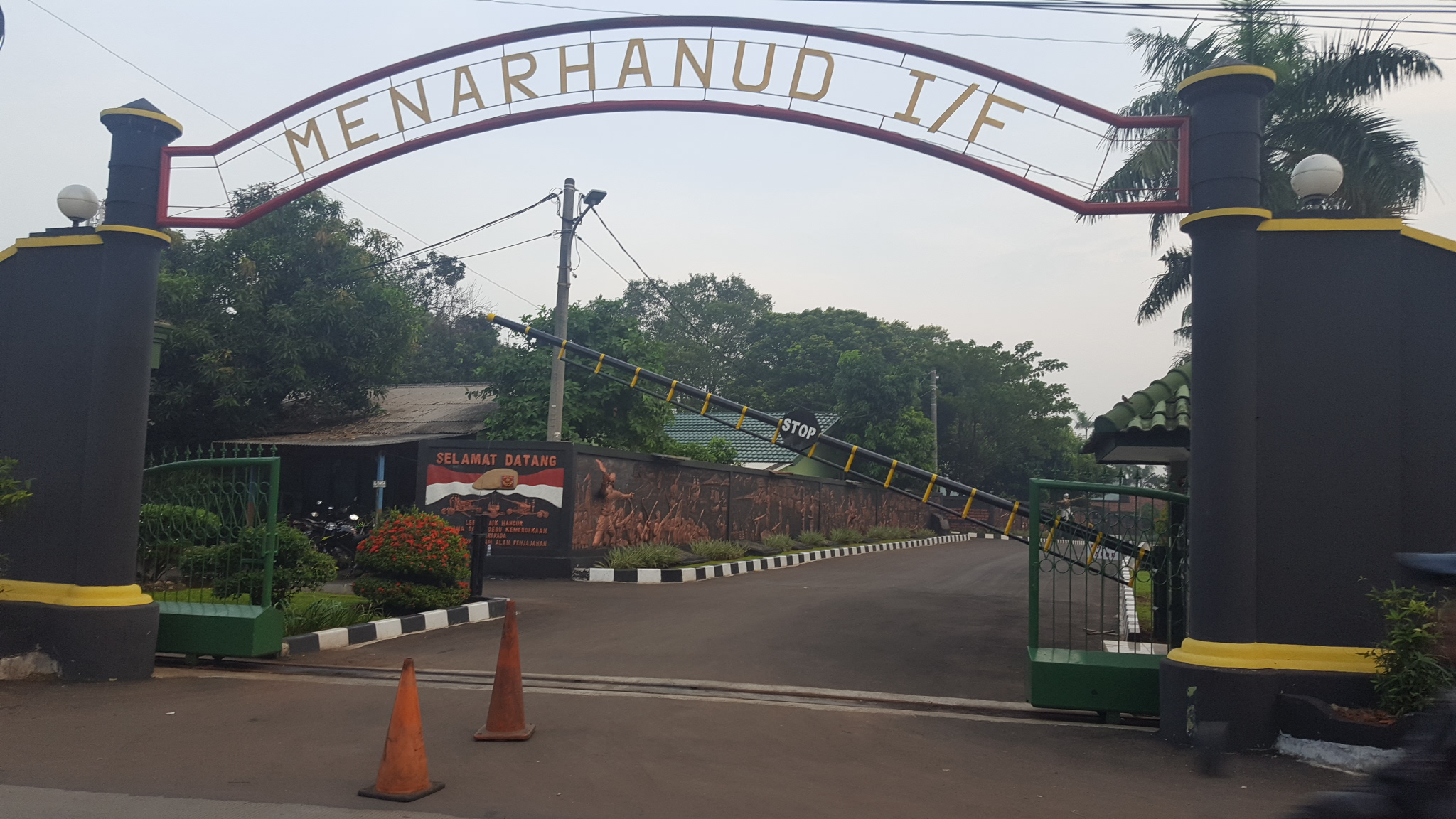
The regimental base in Bintaro.

As of 2025, the regiment has command over the following subunits:

- 1st Air Defense Artillery Regiment
  - 6th Air Defense Artillery Battalion – based in Tanjung Priok, North Jakarta.
  - 10th Air Defense Artillery Battalion – based out of the regimental base in Bintaro.
    - Air Defense Artillery Batteries A-D
  - 3rd Missile Detachment – based in Cikupa, Tangerang Regency. Specifically tasked with the defense of the Istana Negara, the Soekarno–Hatta International Airport, and the Science and Technology Research Center in Serpong.
  - Headquarters Battery

=== Equipment ===
As of 2024, units of the regiment still operates the 57 mm AZP S-60 anti-aircraft gun, acquired from the Soviet Union in the 1960s, and the 10th Battalion possesses Mistral ATLAS launchers. Until 2007, the Missile Detachment operated the Rapier missile system, when it was replaced by Grom missiles.
