= I Dewa Gde Oka =

Indonesian Military officer

- ᬇᬤᬾᬯᬕ᭄ᬤᬾᬑᬓ
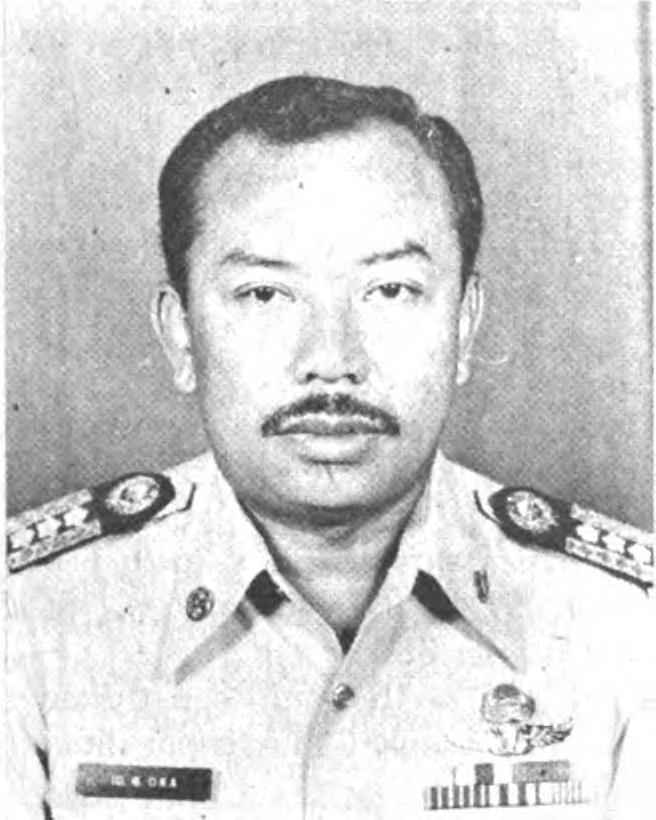

Member of the House of Representatives
- In office 1 October 1997 – 1 October 1999
- President: Suharto; B. J. Habibie
- Constituency: Bali

2nd Vice Governor of Bali
- In office 2 March 1985 – 2 September 1989
- Governor: Ida Bagus Mantra; Ida Bagus Oka
- Preceded by: I Gusti Ngurah Pindha (1971)
- Succeeded by: Aspar Aswin

5th Regent of Badung
- In office 1975–1985
- Governor: Soekarmen; Ida Bagus Mantra
- Preceded by: I Wayan Dhana
- Succeeded by: Pande Made Latra

Personal details
- Born: 20 November 1936 (age 89) Badung, Dutch East Indies
- Party: Golkar

Military service
- Allegiance: Indonesia
- Branch/service: Indonesian Army
- Years of service: 1959–1989
- Rank: Brigadier general
- Unit: Engineer (CZI)

I Dewa Gde Oka (born 20 November 1936) is an Indonesian military officer and politician who served as the 2nd Vice Governor of Bali from 1985 to 1989 and as a member of the House od Representatives from 1997 to 1999.

== Early life and education ==
Oka was born on 20 November 1936 in Badung, Bali, as the son of I Dewa Anom Undisan and I Dewa Ayu Alit. Oka began his studies at the People's School (equivalent to elementary school) in Bangli in 1942 and finished in 1948. He then continued his junior high school education in Bangli and graduated from junior high school in 1953. From Bangli, Oka moved to Singaraja, the province's capital, where he enrolled at the Singaraja High School. During Oka's senior year, he managed to win third place in a slogan-making competition held by the Nusa Tenggara information agency.

== Military career ==
Oka enrolled at the Indonesian Army Engineers Academy in 1956 following his graduation from high school. His classmates in the academy included future vice president Try Sutrisno and ambassador to Thailand I Gede Awet Sara. He graduated from the academy in 1959. From 1962 to 1975, Oka attended various military courses related to engineering and civic service.

After several years of service, Oka reached the rank of major in 1970 and was tasked to attend the Army Command and Staff College. He finished from the college in 1972 and was appointed as the Commander of the Badung Military District after attending a short-term course for military district commanders, making him the first indigenous Balinese to ever held the post. Two years after that, he was transferred to the Wira Satya (Bali) Military Regiment as the chief of staff of the regiment. He ended his military career following his election as the Regent of Badung in 1975. He retired from the military with the rank of brigadier general on 12 November 1989.

== Political career ==
Oka was elected as the Regent of Badung by the local parliament in 1975. Shortly after his election, Oka appointed a new public works chief. The new public works chief under Oka began to introduce pavements in Denpasar, which at that time was a city under the jurisdiction of the Badung government. Oka was re-elected for a second term and was installed on 3 November 1980.

A year before the end of his second term, in 1984 I Dewa Gde Oka was nominated as the Vice Governor of Bali, which had been vacant since 1971. His nomination was approved and he was installed as the vice governor on 2 March 1985. He accompanied governor Ida Bagus Mantra until Mantra's end of term in 1988. The government nominated Ida Bagus Oka to replace Mantra, but Bagus Oka nomination was soon blocked by veterans due to his father's cooperation with the Dutch military during Indonesian National Revolution. Several parties nominated Gde Oka as an alternative candidate for the Bali governor, but the government insisted on Bagus Oka and he became the governor shortly after.

I Dewa Gde Oka was elected as the chairman of the Golkar—the ruling party—branch in Bali for the 1988–1993 period. According to Tempo, Gde Oka, who was one year away from retirement, was elected at the instruction of the armed forces headquarters. Gde Oka later denied this allegation, stating that he was elected purely through the regional conference.

Less than a year after assuming the leadership of Golkar in Bali, I Dewa Gde Oka was dismissed from the vice governor post. He was replaced by Aspar Aswin, a non-Balinese military officer in 1989. I Dewa Gde Oka was nominated as the chairman of the Bali regional parliament during the 1992 Indonesian legislative election, but he suddenly withdrew his nomination. I Dewa Gde Oka involved himself in social organizations after his term as the chairman of Golkar in Bali ended in 1993. Gde Oka resumed his political career after he was elected as a member of the People's Representative Council from Bali in 1997 and held the office until 1999.

In January 2016, I Dewa Gde Oka was nominated as a potential candidate for the chairman of the advisory council of Golkar's Bali branch.

== Personal life ==
I Dewa Gde Oka is married to Walniyati and has children.
