= Christiandy Sanjaya =

Indonesian politician

Drs. Christiandy Sanjaya S.E., M.M.
- 黃漢山
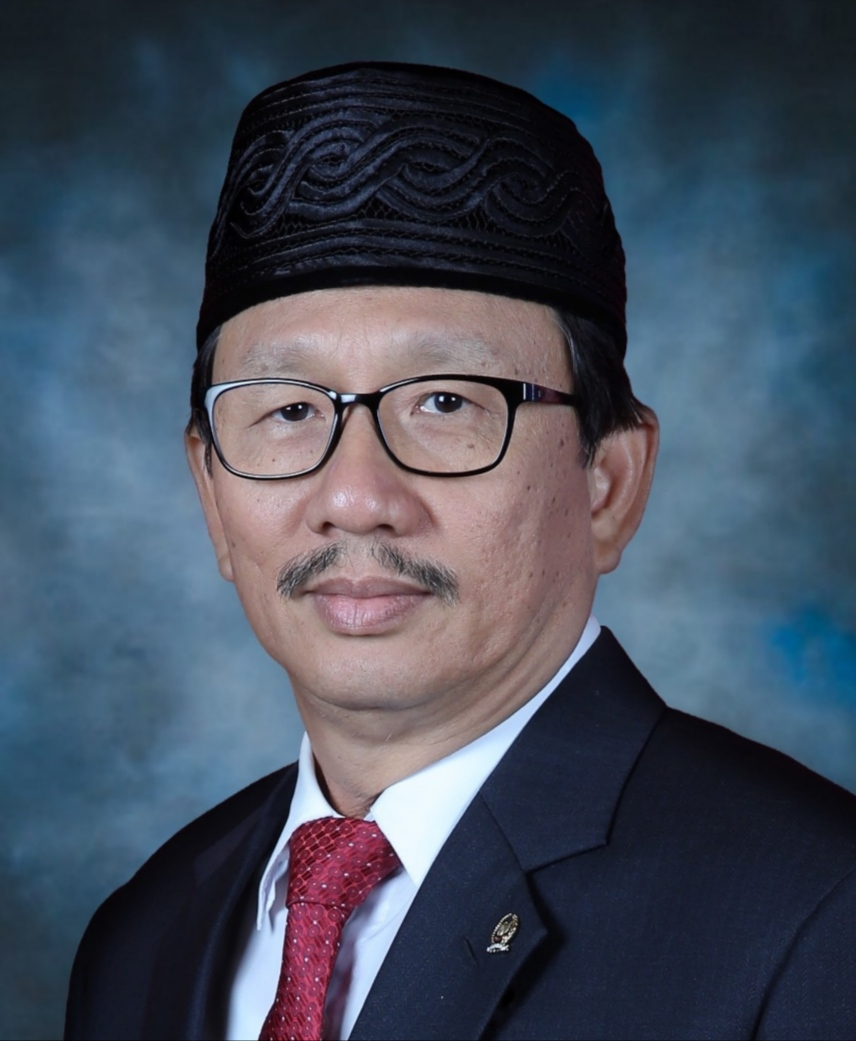

Senator for West Kalimantan
- In office 1 October 2019 – 1 October 2024

Vice Governor of West Kalimantan
- In office 14 January 2008 – 14 January 2018
- President: Susilo Bambang Yudhoyono; Joko Widodo
- Governor: Cornelis
- Preceded by: Laurentius Herman Kadir
- Succeeded by: Ria Norsan

Personal details
- Born: Bong Hon San; 29 March 1964 (age 62) Singkawang, West Kalimantan, Republic of Indonesia
- Party: Partai Demokrat (until 2018)
- Spouse: Karyanti Tjung
- Children: Arkan Dhanu
- Education: Tanjungpura University
- Profession: Teacher, school principal, politician

Christiandy Sanjaya, born Bong Hon San (Chinese: 黃漢山; pinyin: Huáng Hànshān; born 29 March 1964) is an Indonesian politician who served as senator for the Regional Representatives Council from 2019 to 2024. Previously, he served as Vice Governor of West Kalimantan between 2008 and 2018. He was elected to the post together with his running mate, incumbent Governor Cornelis, after winning the 2007 West Kalimantan gubernatorial election. They were re-elected for the second term on the 2012 West Kalimantan gubernatorial election.

== Career ==
Before elected as deputy governor, he was the principal of Immanuel Christian Vocational School.

Political offices
Preceded by Laurentius Herman Kadir	Deputy Governor of West Kalimantan; 2008–2018	Succeeded by Ria Norsan
