= Regional Unity Party =

Regional Unity Party Partai Persatuan Daerah
- Chairman: Oesman Sapta Odang
- Secretary-General: Adhie M. Massardi
- Founded: 18 November 2002
- Dissolved: 1 June 2011
- Merged into: National Unity Party
- Headquarters: Jakarta
- Youth wing: Gerakan Pemuda Daerah (Regional Youth Movement)
- Ideology: Pancasila; Indonesian nationalism Regional interest
- Political position: Centre
- Ballot number: 12

Website
- partaipersatuandaerah.com

The Regional Unity Party (Indonesian: Partai Persatuan Daerah) was a political party in Indonesia. The party was founded as a result of the reforms to the People's Consultative Assembly, Indonesia's supreme law-making body which used to consist of the elected People's Representative Council plus members appointed from the regions and functional groups. When these unelected members were removed in 1999 after the first democratic elections following the fall of Suharto, several regional representatives' led by Oesman Sapta, tried to reestablish the Regional Representatives Faction. The members of this faction took the view that the elected Regional Representatives Council, which replaced the unelected members of the People's Consultative Assembly, would not be effective as it was too small. They therefore decided to establish a political party to represent the interests of the regions.

In the 2004 legislative elections, the party won 0.6% of the popular vote and no seats in the People's Representative Council. It contested the 2009 elections, but won only 0.53 percent of the vote, less than the 2.5 percent electoral threshold, and once again was awarded no seats in the People's Representative Council.

The party's program included support for free education and healthcare the eradication of corruption, particularly in Papua, Kalimantan and Sulawesi.

Following its poor result in the 2009 vote, the party joined nine other smaller parties to form the National Unity Party (Indonesian: Partai Persatuan Nasional).

== Election results ==
=== Presidential election results ===
Election	Ballot number	Candidate	Running mate	1st round (Total votes)	Share of votes	Outcome	2nd round (Total votes)	Share of votes	Outcome
2004	Neutral	Neutral					Neutral		
2009	Neutral	Neutral							

=== Legislative election results ===
Election	Ballot number	Leader	Seats		Total votes	Share of votes	Outcome of election
Election	Ballot number	Leader	No.	±	Total votes	Share of votes	Outcome of election
2004	23	Oesman Sapta Odang	0 / 550		657,916	0.57%	Opposition
2009	12	Oesman Sapta Odang	0 / 560	0	550,581	0.53%	Opposition
