= Soedjiman =

Indonesian military officer and politician (1928–2014)

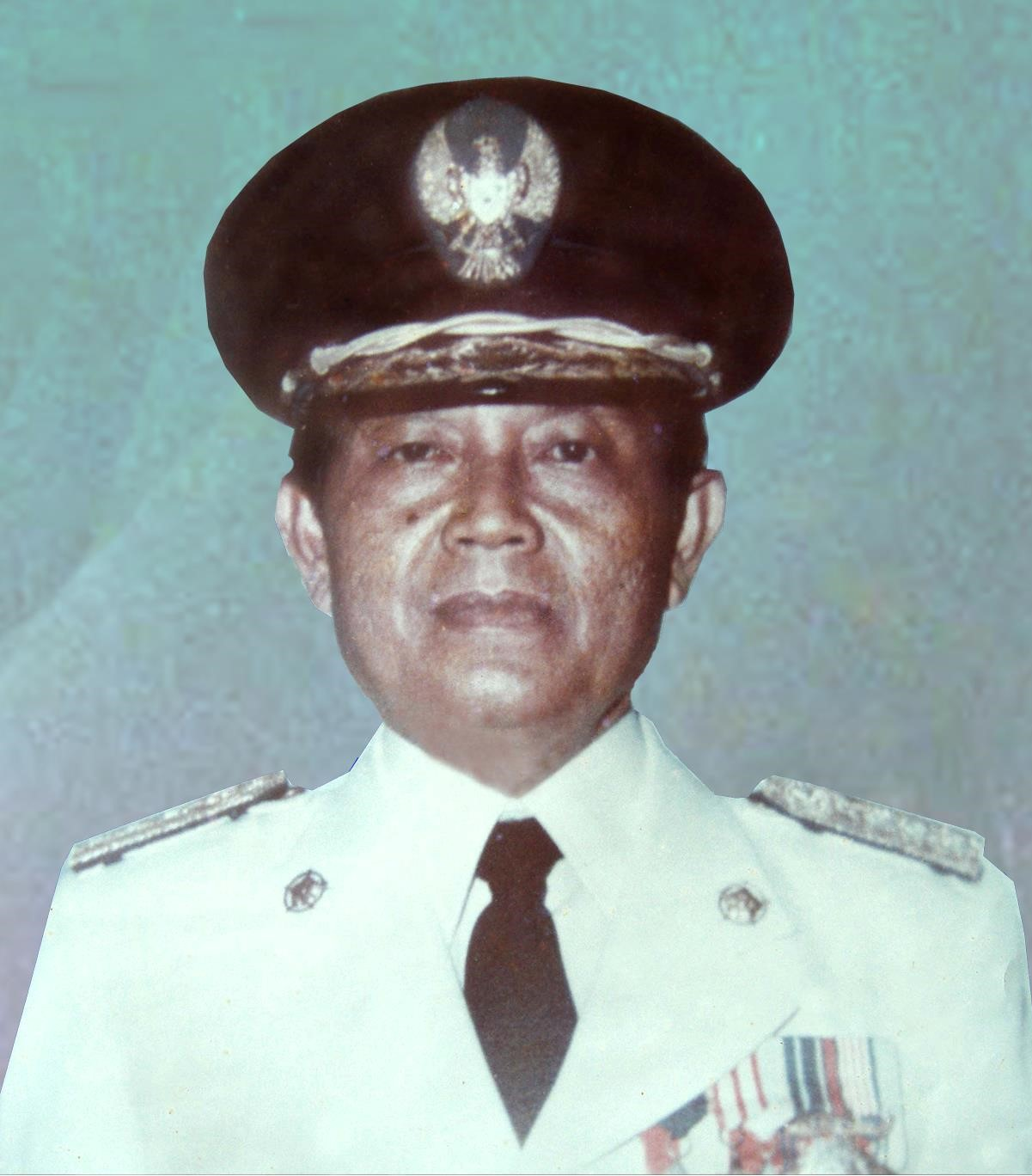

Governor of West Kalimantan
- In office 27 September 1977 – 8 January 1988
- President: Suharto
- Deputy: Abassuni Abubakar; Jimmi Mohamad Ibrahim
- Preceded by: Kadarusno
- Succeeded by: Parjoko Suryokusumo

Personal details
- Born: 1 July 1928 Yogyakarta Sultanate, Dutch East Indies
- Died: 3 December 2014 (aged 86) Jakarta, Indonesia
- Resting place: Kalibata Heroes' Cemetery
- Party: Golkar
- Spouse: Sri Sunarsih

Military service
- Allegiance: Indonesia
- Branch/service: Indonesian Army
- Years of service: 1948—1977
- Rank: Major General
- Battles/wars: Indonesian National Revolution

Soedjiman (1 July 1928 – 3 December 2014) was an Indonesian military officer and politician who served as the governor of West Kalimantan from 1977 until 1988.

== Early life and education ==
Soedjiman was born on 1 July 1928 in the Bantul area of the Yogyakarta Sultanate, which at that time was part of the Dutch East Indies. He went to study at the Standard School – a second-class elementary school in Dutch East Indies – and graduated from the school in 1940. After he graduated from the Standard School, he continued his education at the Schakelschool, which he finished in 1942, and at the Junior Advanced School (equivalent to Junior High School), which he finished in 1944. Subsequently, he enrolled at a carpentry high school for a year until 1945.

== National Military Academy ==
Following the proclamation of Indonesian independence, Soedjiman enrolled at the Yogya Military Academy in Yogyakarta. At that time, the academy was just recently established on 31 October 1945. Soedjiman, along with 441 other cadets, was accepted into the academy.

After he finished his final exam, he was deployed to Surakarta on 19 September 1948 to quell the Madiun Affair. Soedjiman was assigned to the Nasuhi Battalion. The battalion began its campaign from Surakarta and ended it in Ponorogo. The conflict finally ended at the end of October 1948, and Soedjiman was withdrawn from the battlefield to prepare for his graduation.

Soedjiman officially graduated with the rank of second lieutenant on 28 November 1948 in a ceremony at the Istana Negara. From the 442 cadets who were accepted into the academy, only 196 cadets – including Soedjiman – graduated from the academy.

== Deployments ==
A month after his graduation from the academy, the Dutch began a military offensive codenamed Operation Kraai. As a second lieutenant, Soedjiman was put as the commander of a military under-district in the Yogyakarta Military Sub-Territorial Command. After the operation ended and a peace treaty was signed between the Dutch and Indonesians, Soedjiman was posted to South Sumatra, and was put in command of a platoon in the Red Garuda Battalion. Later, Soedjiman became a quartermaster in South Sumatra.

In 1952, following the Darul Islam rebellion in West Java, Soedjiman was posted to the province and commanded a company inside the 328th Battalion. Following his duty in West Java, Soedjiman was posted to Jakarta and served as a company commander in the city.

After serving as a company commander in Jakarta, Soedjiman returned to West Java in the regency of Tasikmalaya in 1955 to fought Darul Islam rebels. The Indonesian Army had deployed Soedjiman as part of Operation Bharatayuda, a military offensive aimed at destroying Darul Islam entirely. Soedjiman remarked that a military offensive was required as both sides failed to negotiate terms. During this operation, Soedjiman was deployed again at the Nasuhi Battalion, which at that time has been renamed to Airborne Raider Infantry Battalion 305/Skull. After his deployment in West Java had ended, Soedjiman returned again to Jakarta to command the Regional Training Regiment of the city.

Less than a year later, Soedjiman was assigned on a military offensive to crack down the Revolutionary Government of the Republic of Indonesia (PRRI). Soedjiman was put in charge of section I of the Siliwangi Combat Team Regiment. The regiment, which was under the command of Umar Wirahadikusumah, was deployed in Sibolga city to fight against the Batara I battalion of PRRI under the command of Aladin Sitompul.

With the help of a subdistrict chief from Sibolga, Soedjiman attempted to persuade Sitompul to surrender instead of launching an attack against his forces. Sitompul agreed to meet with Soedjiman alone in a forest in Sibolga. After several minutes of negotiation, Sitompul finally agreed with Soedjiman's terms of surrender, and Sitompul's 700-men battalion surrendered their firearms. Soedjiman's successful negotiations with Sitompul shocked Wirahadikusumah. Wirahadikusumah then contacted Abdul Haris Nasution – at that the Indonesian Army chief of staff – to ask for approval regarding the surrender. Nasution initially feared the backlash that would occur after the surrender, but he approved the surrender after being convinced by Wirahadikusumah.

Soedjiman returned to West Java after his successful deployment in Sibolga. In West Java, Soedjiman held various military posts, namely as the Deputy Commander of the 304th Infantry Battalion, Commander of the Garut Military District, Head of Section 5 of the Central Priangan Military Area, Head of Section 2 of the Banten Military Area, and as the Commander of the 327th Infantry Battalion in Cilincing.

In 1962, Soedjiman, who at that time was a lieutenant colonel, returned to Jakarta to serve as the Commander of the Central Jakarta Military District.

== 30 September Movement and aftermath ==
On 1 October 1965, a group of Indonesian National Armed Forces calling themselves the 30 September Movement members assassinated six Indonesian Army generals in an abortive coup d'état. A group of left-wing politicians and military officials were deemed guilty in the coup d'état and became fugitive. Supardjo, Soedjiman's former superior in the army, was also named as a suspect. Slowly, almost all of the fugitives were either arrested or assassinated by the armed forces. As of 1966, only two fugitives remained: Supardjo and a communist politician named Anwar Sanusi. Suharto, who at that time has just recently appointed as the President of Indonesia, stated that Supardjo's arrest would be "very valuable to Indonesia's populace."

An analysis from the Indonesian Army concluded that both Supardjo and Anwar Sanusi were hiding in a Navy base or Air Force base in Central Jakarta. Suharto instructed the Army, Navy, and Air Force to create a task force with the main goal of arresting Supardjo. Soedjiman, as the army's military commander in Central Jakarta, spearheaded the arrest efforts. Soedjiman formed the Kalong Djaja (literally Glorious Flying Fox) task force to arrest Supardjo.

The first raid to arrest Supardjo was conducted by the task force on 13 October 1966. The target was a house owned by Bowo, a civil servant who worked for the Navy. However, the task force failed to arrest Supardjo, as Supardjo had fled from the house prior to the arrival of the task. Subsequent raids by the task forces, conducted between December 1966 until January 1967, failed to found Supardjo.

However, on 12 January 1967, an Air Force intelligence found out that both Supardo and Anwar Sanusi were hiding in a cluster area of airmen's house. Supardjo and Sanusi were arrested without any resistance in a sudden raid by the Kalong Djaja task force. Both were arrested and kept captive in the Central Jakarta Military District HQ.

After the arrest, Soedjiman intended to report the arrest to Amirmachmud, who at that time was the military commander for Jakarta. However, Amirmachmud's bodyguard prohibited Soedjiman to enter Amirmachmud's office, as at that time he was in the middle of the Eid prayers. Soedjiman insisted on Amirmachmud's bodyguard that he had something important to deliver. Amirmachmud's bodyguard finally relented and allowed Soedjiman to meet Amirmachmud.

After saluting Amirmachmud, Soedjiman reported to him that both Supardjo and Anwar Sanusi has been arrested and kept captive in the Central Jakarta Military District HQ. Feeling very excited, Amirmachmud spontaneously hugged and kissed Soedjiman. In a later interview, Soedjiman admitted that Amirmachmud's kiss was the first time he was ever kissed by a man. Amirmachmud and Soedjiman then went to the HQ. After scolding Supardjo and Anwar Sanusi in the HQ, Amirmachmud returned to his headquarters, while Soedjiman stayed at the Central Jakarta Military District HQ to prepare for the press conference. The press conference was held at 10.00 on 12 January 1967. At the conference, Soedjiman stated that the arrest of Supardjo could be conducted properly with the coordination of the Navy, Airforce, and the Army. Soedjiman also informed that the task force also arrested several communist politicians and reporters before arresting Supardjo and Anwar Sanusi.

Following the movement's suppression, Soedjiman would be appointed commander of the 1st Infantry Brigade under Kodam Jayakarta.

== Governor of West Kalimantan ==
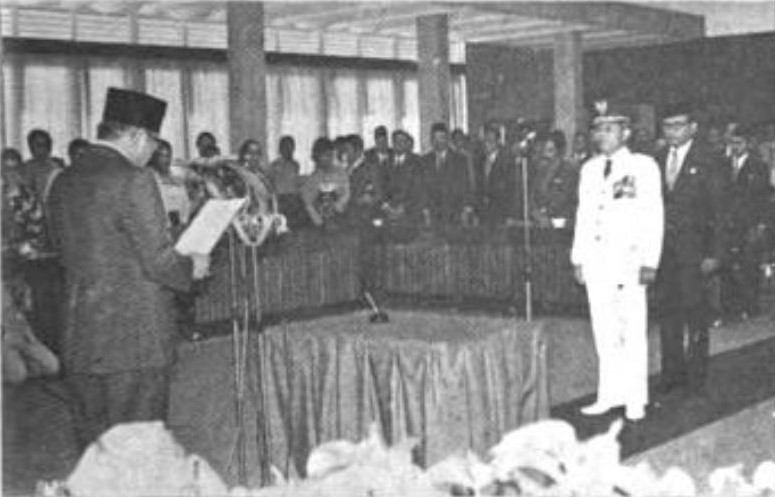

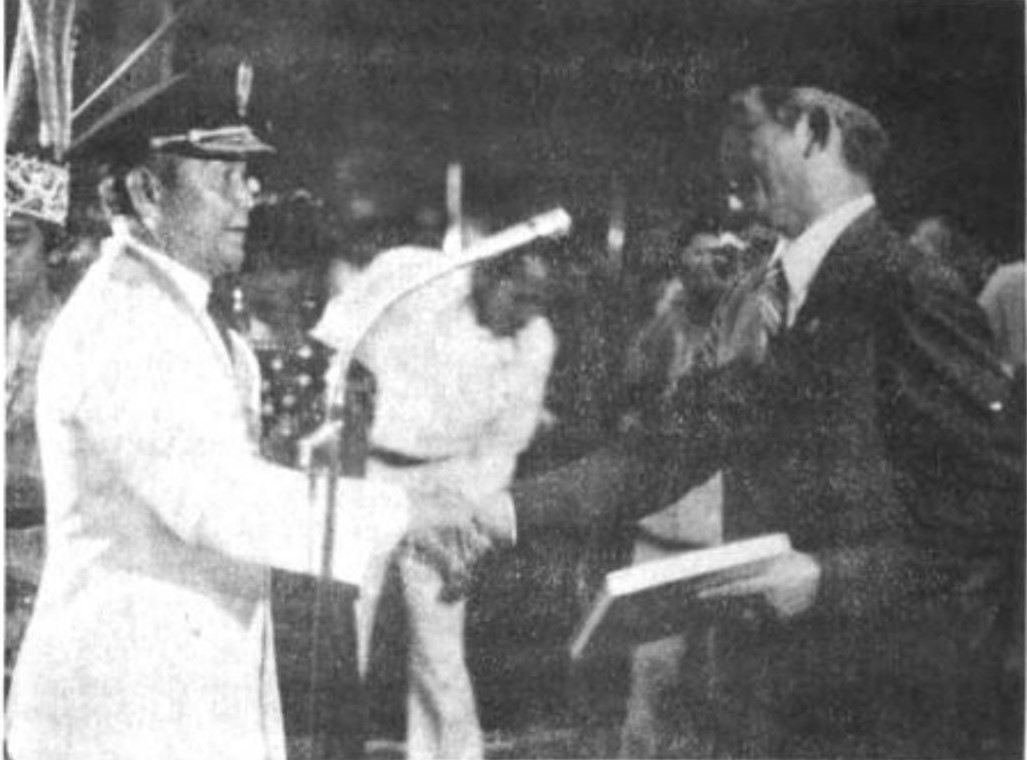
Inauguration of Soedjiman as the Governor of West Kalimantan for his first term (top) and second term (bottom).

=== Background ===
After almost three years serving as the Commander of the Defence and Security Headquarters Corps, Soedjiman was planned to be transferred to North Sumatra as a commander of the 1st Military Regional Command/Bukit Barisan. However, to Soedjiman's surprise, the commander of the armed forces, General Maraden Panggabean canceled the transfer order and Muhammad Ismail was appointed as the replacement.

Soedjiman was nominated as the Governor of West Kalimantan instead. His appointment acts as a reconciliation between the military and the West Kalimantan people, who had different opinions on who should be the next governor. The Regional Military Commander in West Kalimantan, Norman Sasono, actively campaigning for Colonel Marjans Saragih as the next governor, while the civilian officials and the West Kalimantan officials opted for Governor Kadarusno, the previous governor, to continue for a second term. Thus, Soedjiman was inaugurated as the acting governor on 27 September 1978. Soedjiman, who was nominated by Panggabean for the governor's office, won the gubernatorial election and was inaugurated as a governor for a five-year term on 4 January 1978.

Soedjiman's first term as governor would end on 4 January 1983. The Regional People's Representative Council of West Kalimantan held an election to elect a governor for the next term. The election saw four candidates, including Soedjiman, running for the office. Soedjiman won the election with 30 out of 39 votes and he was inaugurated for his second term on 8 January 1983. He ended his second term exactly five years later after he handed over his office to Parjoko Suryokusumo.

== Awards ==
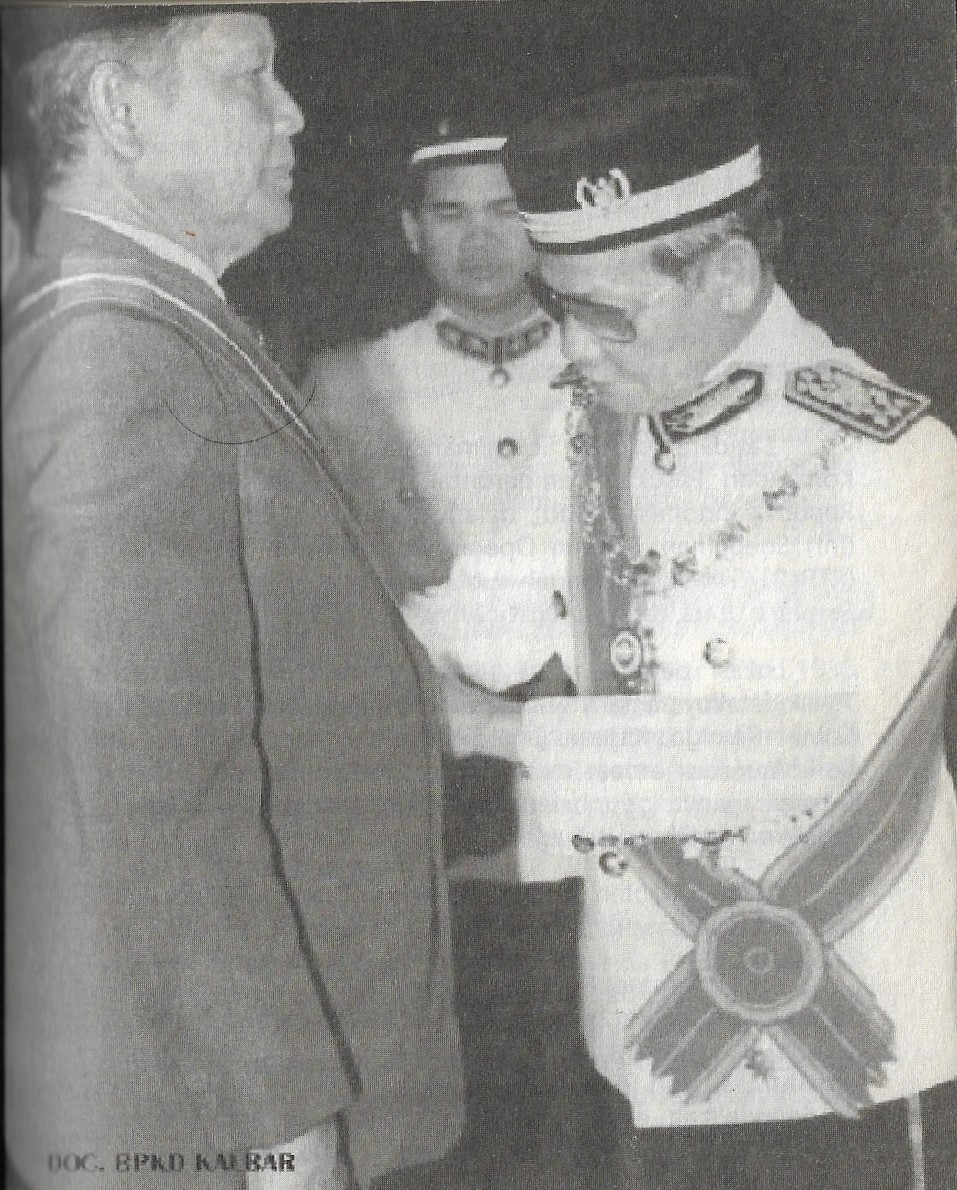
Soedjiman receiving the Knight Commander of the Most Exalted Order of the Star of Sarawak from Ahmad Zaidi Adruce, the Yang di-Pertua Negeri of Sarawak.

=== Domestic ===
- Military Distinguished Service Star (Bintang Dharma)
- Guerilla Star (Bintang Gerilya)
- Grand Meritorious Military Order Star, 3rd class (Bintang Yudha Dharma Nararya)
- Army Meritorious Service Star, 1st class (Bintang Kartika Eka Pakçi Pratama) (26 November 1985)
- Army Meritorious Service Star, 3rd class (Bintang Kartika Eka Pakçi Nararya)
- Armed Forces Eight Years’ Service Star (Bintang Sewindu Angkatan Perang)
- Military Long Service Medals, 2nd category (Satyalancana Kesetiaan 24 Tahun)
- Independence War Medal I (Satyalancana Perang Kemerdekaan I)
- Independence War Medal II (Satyalancana Perang Kemerdekaan II)
- Military Operational Service Medal I (Satyalancana Gerakan Operasi Militer I)
- Military Operational Service Medal V (Satyalancana Gerakan Operasi Militer V)
- Satyalancana Sapta Marga
- Satyalancana Penegak
- Satyalancana Dharma Pala

=== Foreign ===
- Knight Commander of the Most Exalted Order of the Star of Sarawak (Darjah Utama Yang Amat Mulia Panglima Negara Bintang Sarawak) (10 October 1987)

== Bibliography ==
- General Elections Institution (1982), Buku Pelengkap VI Pemilihan Umum 1982: Ringkasan Riwayat Hidup dan Riwayat Perjuangan Anggota Majelis Permusyawaratan Rakyat Hasil Pemilihan Umum 1982 yang Bukan Anggota Dewan Perwakilan Rakyat [Supplement VI of the 1982 General Elections: Summary of Biography and Battle Records of the Members of the People's Consultative Assembly Elected at the 1982 General Elections Who is Not Part of the People's Representative Council] (in Indonesian), Jakarta
- General Elections Institution (1987), Buku Pelengkap IX Pemilihan Umum 1987: Ringkasan Riwayat Hidup dan Riwayat Perjuangan Anggota Majelis Permusyawaratan Rakyat [Supplement IX of the 1987 General Elections: Summary of Biography and Battle Records of the Members of the People's Consultative Assembly] (in Indonesian), Jakarta
- Moehkardi (7 August 2019), Akademi Militer Yogya dalam Perjuangan Fisik 1945 sampai dengan 1949, Gadjah Mada University, ISBN 978-602-386-416-4
- Aju (2016), Soedjiman: Tokoh Penting di Balik Penangkapan Brigjen Soepardjo, Derwait Press, ISBN 978-602-0869-70-4
- Military History Office of Siliwangi Regional Military Command (1968), Siliwangi dari masa kemasa (in Indonesian), Fakta Mahjuma
