= Haris Sudarno =

Indonesian army general and politician (born 1941)

Member of the House of Representatives
- In office 1 June 1995 – 1 October 1997
- President: Suharto
- Preceded by: Suwito Sumodarmodjo
- Parliamentary group: Armed Forces

Personal details
- Born: December 17, 1941 Trangkil, Pati, Central Java, Dutch East Indies
- Died: August 3, 2025 (aged 83) Jakarta, Indonesia
- Party: Indonesian Justice and Unity Party
- Spouse: Rantina Haris (m. 1969)
- Children: 3
- Parent: Sodiwirjo (father)
- Education: National Military Academy

Military service
- Allegiance: Indonesia
- Branch/service: Army
- Years of service: 1965 – 1997
- Rank: Major general
- Unit: Infantry

Haris Sudarno (17 December 1941 – 3 August 2025) is an Indonesian retired army general and politician who served as a member of the House of Representatives from 1995 until 1997. Previously, he was the commander of the Brawijaya (East Java) Regional Military Command from 1993 to 1995.

== Early life ==
Haris was born on 17 December 1941 in Trangkil, a small village 10 kilometres (6.2 mi) from the Pati Regency in Central Java. Haris's father, Sodiwirjo, died while he was six years old. His mother re-married several years later to a Dutch plantation employee who was a religious teacher. Haris was taught to read the Quran by his stepfather.

Haris entered elementary school in 1949 and completed it in 1955. According to a later interview, Haris recalled being always elected as the class chairman. Similarly, while he was in junior high school and high school, he was appointed as chairman for sports in his school, and later as the chairman of the school union. Later on, he was elected as the all-Pati student leader.

After completing his high school education in 1961, Haris applied to the engineering, agriculture, and science major of the Gadjah Mada University. He was accepted at the National Military Academy in 1962 and joined the infantry corps. He graduated from the academy in 1965 and was commissioned as an infantry second lieutenant.

== Career ==
Shortly after his graduation, Haris was deployed to quell the 30 September Movement. In 1966, he attended a unit course for infantry officers (kursus lanjutan perwira infanteri) and fought in Kalimantan during the Indonesia–Malaysia confrontation. After the confrontation ended, Haris was sent to the region again in 1968 to crush the North Kalimantan Communist Party. Sometime in the 1970s, he was assigned as the deputy commander of the 100th Airborne Battalion, with commander Aswin Tombak Surungan Siagian as his superior.

From 1973 to 1974, Haris attended an advanced course for infantry officers. He completed the course in early 1974 and was assigned to the Jayakarta (Jakarta) regional command as an officer at the 1st Infantry Brigade. He, along with the brigade, was sent to stabilize Jakarta following the Malari incident. After the incident, he was promoted to become the commander of the administrative support regiment of the brigade. He held this position until shortly before the 1977 elections.

Haris became the chief of training of the regional military command from 1977 to 1978 before being promoted to the rank of lieutenant colonel in 1979. He then assumed command of the 203rd Infantry Battalion from 1978 to 1979. He underwent education at the Indonesian Army Command and General Staff College from 1979 to 1980 before assigned to assume command of the West Jakarta military district until 1982. Haris was promoted to the rank of colonel and became the commander of the 1st Infantry Brigade from 1985 until 1987. He underwent further military education at the Joint Command and General Staff College in 1987.

== Political career ==
Haris began his involvement in politics as an appointee from the armed forces to the House of Representatives on 1 June 1995, replacing Soewito Sudarmodjo. During his two-year stint, Haris was seated in the 6th commission, which handles matters relating to fees, investment, and mining.

== Personal life ==
Haris was married to Rantina Haris, a North Sumatran-born Javanese woman, in 1969, after his return from military operation in Kalimantan. The couple has two daughters and one son.

== Bibliography ==
- Anam, Choirul (1995), Haris Sudarno: Jenderal Bintang Dua, Surabaya
- Tim Penyusun (1997), Buku Kenangan Anggota Dewan Perwakilan Rakyat Republik Indonesia Masa Keanggotaan 1992-1997 (PDF), Jakarta: Sekretariat Jenderal Dewan Perwakilan Rakyat Republik Indonesia, archived from the original (PDF) on 2018-09-09
