= Kodam Jayakarta =

Jayakarta Jaya Military Regional Command
- Komando Daerah Militer Jaya Jayakarta; Kodam Jaya
- Coat of Arms
- Active: 24 December 1949 – present
- Country: Indonesia
- Branch: Indonesian National Armed Forces (TNI)
- Type: Territorial army
- Role: Defending the Greater Jakarta area (excluding Bogor), supporting law enforcement, providing additional security for VVIPs during State Visits, and securing vital installations in the capital city region (as-per request from civil authorities)
- Size: At least 15,000
- Part of: Indonesian Army
- Garrison/HQ: Cawang, East Jakarta
- Mottos: Aneka Daya Tunggal Bhakti "Various Powers, One Devotion"
- Website: kodamjaya-tniad.mil.id

The Jayakarta Jaya Military Regional Command (Indonesian: Komando Daerah Militer Jaya Jayakarta), or Kodam Jaya Jayakarta, more commonly known as Kodam Jaya, is a regional military command of the Indonesian Army responsible for the defense and security of the Greater Jakarta area. Officially established on 24 December 1949, it originated from local resistance forces during the Indonesian National Revolution, and was designated as the military command for Jakarta Raya following Dutch recognition of Indonesian independence.

Headquartered in Cawang, East Jakarta, Kodam Jaya is responsible with safeguarding the national capital, supporting law enforcement operations, securing critical infrastructure, and providing protection for visiting heads of state. It oversees a mix of combat, combat-support, training, and territorial units, including:

- 1st Mechanized Infantry Brigade (“Jayasakti” or “Capital Security Forces”), composed of the 201st, 202nd, and 203rd Mechanized Infantry Battalions.
- 1st Cavalry Brigade (Limpung Alugoro), which includes the 7th and 9th Cavalry Battalions.
- 1st Air Defense Artillery Regiment (Falatehan) consisting of two battalions and a missile detachment.

Kodam Jaya’s territorial command extends through several Military Resort Commands (Korem), which are further subdivided into District Military Commands (Kodim) covering Jakarta, Bekasi, Depok, and Tangerang.

The training component is managed by the Kodam Jaya Training Regiment (Resimen Induk Kodam Jaya or Rindam Jaya), which includes combat, skills, officers, enlisted, and national defense training schools.

Support units include military police, medical, public relations, intelligence, logistics, engineers, signals corps, chaplaincy, ordnance, and various other specialized services.

== History ==
On 1 September 1945, the Jakarta branch of the People's Security Agency (Badan Keamanan Rakyat/BKR) was founded with Lt. Col. Mufraeni Mukmin as its branch leader. On 29 September 1945, allied forces (with Netherlands Indies Civil Administration personnel attached) under the command of Lt. Gen. Sir Philip Christison landed from HMS Cumberland in Tanjung Priok Harbor to disarm Japanese troops and to liberate prisoners of war. BKR and Indonesian youth in API, Kris Hisbulah, and other paramilitary organizations confronted the allied forces. To increase armed resistance against the Allied forces, the government of the Republic of Indonesia founded the People's Security Armed Forces (Tentara Keamanan Rakyat/TKR) on 5 October 1945. One infantry regiment of TKR in Jakarta was organized under the command of Lt. Col. Mufraini Mukmin.

On 24 December 1949, there began a transfer of power from the Dutch government to the Republic of Indonesia. With that transfer came a signing of documents to shift the Jakarta Raya region from Dutch-based Batavia En Ommelanden to Indonesia-based Jakarta Raya, under the supervision of the UN Security Council's Three Nations Commission, "Komisi Tiga Negara" (KTN). In December 1949, some units such as "Kala Hitam" Battalion and "Siluman" Battalion were dispatched to reinforce Basis Commando Jakarta Raya, following which Lt. Col. R. Taswin Natadiningrat was appointed as commander of Basis Commando Jakarta Raya.

In January 1950, Basis Commando Jakarta Raya changed its name to Greater Jakarta Military Base Command (Komando Militer Pangkalan Jakarta Raya or KMP Jakarta Raya). Then, following instructions from the Army HQ on 10 May 1950, City Military Command (Komando Militer Kota or KMK) was changed to Greater Jakarta City Military Command (Komando Militer Kota Besar Jakarta Raya or KMKB-DR). As the Republic of Indonesia continued to develop, the Army Chief of Staff released two letters of command numbered SP 1671/10/1959 and SP 1672/10/1959 (both dated 24 December 1959), which reorganized the Army command for the capital, thus the 5th Military Regional Command/Jayakarta (Komando Daerah Militer V/Jayakarta, also known as the Jakarta Military Region, MRC 5/Jaya, Kodam V/Jaya or Region V/Jayakarta) was founded in the basis of the KMKB-DR which a new commander was to be named for this separate command for the region. After that, on 19 January 1960, at 9:00 am in Lapangan Banteng, the Chief of Staff of the Army, Lt. Gen. Abdul Haris Nasution, appointed Col.(inf) Umar Wirahadikusumah as the first Commander of Kodam V/Jaya.

The 1st Mechanized Infantry Brigade (formerly known as the 1st Infantry Brigade) took part in the events of the 30 September Movement, its commander being one of the attempted coup's leaders. Col. Wirahadikusumah was spared from any action due to pressure from Maj. Gen. Suharto, then-commander of Kostrad, for him to prevent having to join the rebel forces in his area of operations. In 1984, the command simply became Kodam Jaya as part of an armed forces-wide reorganization, its numerical designation removed.

The name "Jayakarta" comes from the original name of the city of Jakarta before the arrival of the Dutch and is rooted in the historic name of Jakarta, coming from Sanskrit: "Jaya" (“victorious”) and "Karta" (“achieved”), literally “achieved through victory”, translated as "Complete Victory" or "Great Deed". It refers to the historical background of the historical city when the Army of Fatahillah successfully defeated the Sunda Kingdom and drove the Portuguese forces out of Jakarta, then known as Sunda Kelapa, in the 16th century.

== Territorial units ==
The Territorial Units under Kodam Jaya consist of two Military Area Commands (Korem) units and one self-supporting Military District Command (Kodim BS).

- 051 Military Area Command/Wijayakarta, located in Bekasi

- 0504 Military District Command - South Jakarta
- 0505 Military District Command - East Jakarta
- 0507 Military District Command - Bekasi
- 0508 Military District Command - Depok
- 0509 Military District Command - Bekasi Regency

- 052 Military Area Command/Wijayakrama, in Tangerang

- 0502 Military District Command - North Jakarta
- 0503 Military District Command - West Jakarta
- 0506 Military District Command - Tangerang
- 0510 Military District Command - Tigaraksa

- 0501 Military District Command (self-supporting unit), located in Central Jakarta

There are also two Territorial Development infantry battalions under Kodam Jaya:

- 843rd Territorial Development infantry battalion - Cibitung, Bekasi
- 899th Territorial Development infantry battalion - Depok

== Combat Units ==
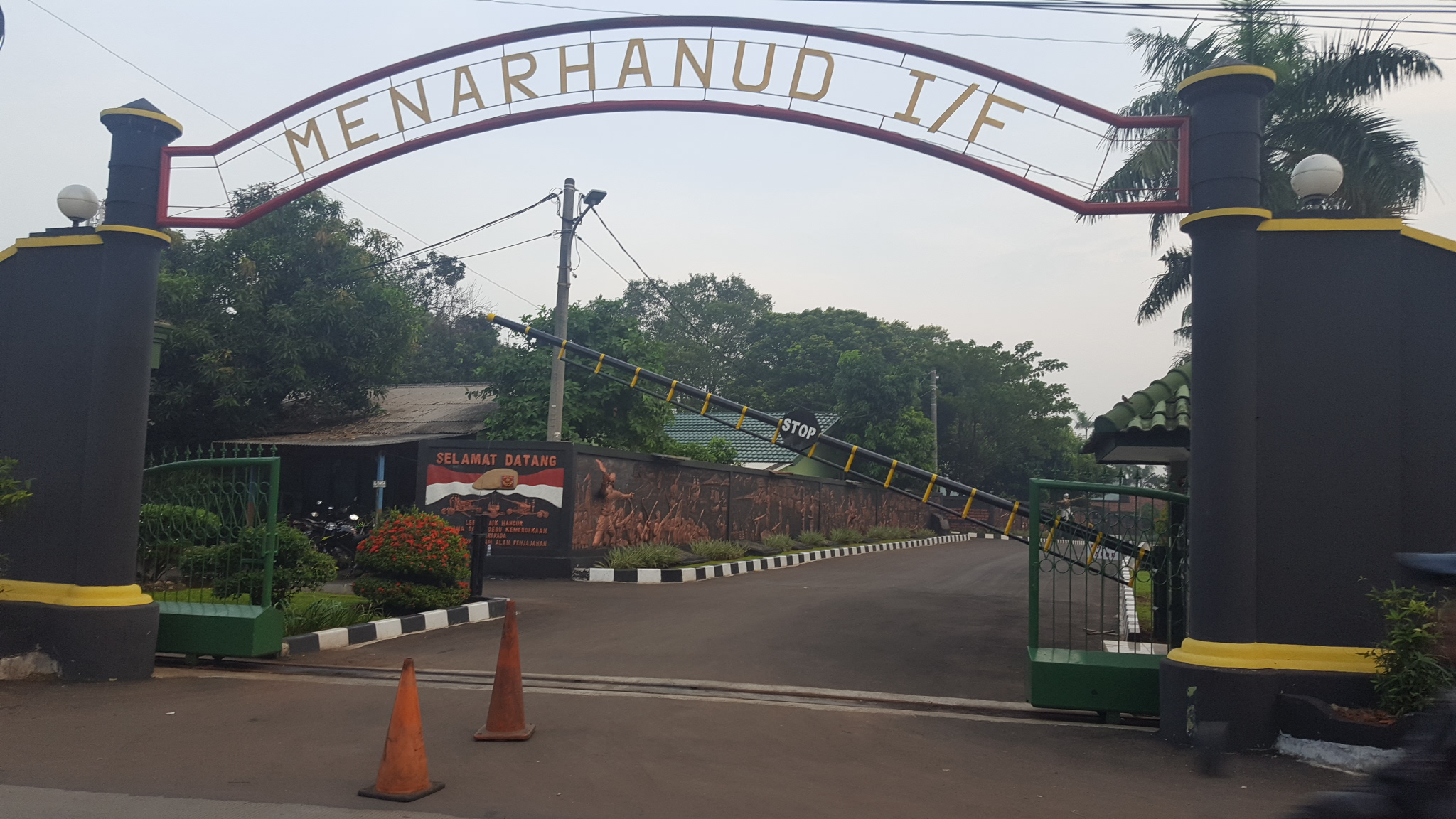
The 1st Air Defence Artillery Regiment under the command of Kodam Jaya

Kodam Jaya also oversees several Army combat and combat support units:

- 1st Mechanized Infantry Brigade/Jayasakti (Pengaman Ibu Kota or Capital Security Forces)
  - 201st Mechanized Infantry Battalion/Jaya Yudha
  - 202nd Mechanized Infantry Battalion/Tajimalela
  - 203rd Mechanized Infantry Battalion/Arya Kemuning
- 1st Cavalry Brigade/Limpung Alugoro
  - 7th Cavalry Battalion/Pragosa Satya (equipped with wheeled V-150 and its variants)
  - 9th Cavalry Battalion/Satya Dharma Kala (equipped with Scorpion 90 tanks and its variants)
- 1st Air Defense Artillery Regiment/Falatehan
  - 6th Air Defense Artillery Battalion
  - 10th Air Defense Artillery Battalion
  - 003 Air Defense Artillery Detachment (Missile)
- 11th Combat Engineer Battalion/Durdhaga Wighra
- 7th Field Artillery Battalion/Biring Galih
- 3rd Combat Engineers Detachment/Agni Tirta Dharma

== Training units ==
Training units under Kodam Jaya are organized into the Kodam Jaya Training Regiment (Resimen Induk Kodam Jaya or "Rindam Jaya"). The units are:

- Satuan Dodik Latpur (Combat Training Command Unit)
- Satuan Dodik Kejuruan (Specialized Training Command Unit)
- Sekolah Calon Bintara (Non-Commissioned Officer Training School)
- Sekolah Calon Tamtama (Enlisted Training School)
- Satuan Dodik Bela Negara (National Defense Training Command Unit) – a defense auxiliary components training center
  - Reserve Component Battalion Kodam Jayakarta

== Supporting units ==
- Kodam Jaya Capital Military Police Command (Pomdam Jaya)
- Kodam Jaya Capital Public Affairs and Press Office (Pendam Jaya)
- Kodam Jaya Office of the Adjutant General (Anjendam Jaya)
- Kodam Jaya Military Physical Fitness and Sports Office (Jasdam Jaya)
- Kodam Jaya Medical Department (Kesdam Jaya)
- Kodam Jaya Veterans and National Reserves Administration (Babiminvetcadam Jaya)
- Kodam Jaya Topography Service (Topdam Jaya)
- Kodam Jaya Chaplaincy Corps (Bintaldam Jaya)
- Kodam Jaya Finance Office (Kudam Jaya)
- Kodam Jaya Legal Affairs Office (Kumdam Jaya)
- Kodam Jaya HQ and HQ Services Detachment (Detasemen Jaya)
- Kodam Jaya Information and Communications Technology Office (Infolahtadam Jaya)
- Kodam Jaya Logistics and Transportation Division (Bekangdam Jaya)
- Kodam Jaya Signals Corps (Hubdam Jaya)
- Kodam Jaya Ordnance Department (Paldam Jaya)
- Kodam Jaya Engineers Command (Zidam Jaya)
- Kodam Jaya Cyber Operations Unit (Sandidam Jaya)
- Kodam Jaya Intelligence Command (Deninteldam Jaya)
