= Sidikalang =

Town in North Sumatra, Indonesia

Coordinates: 1.9210°N 98.5660°E

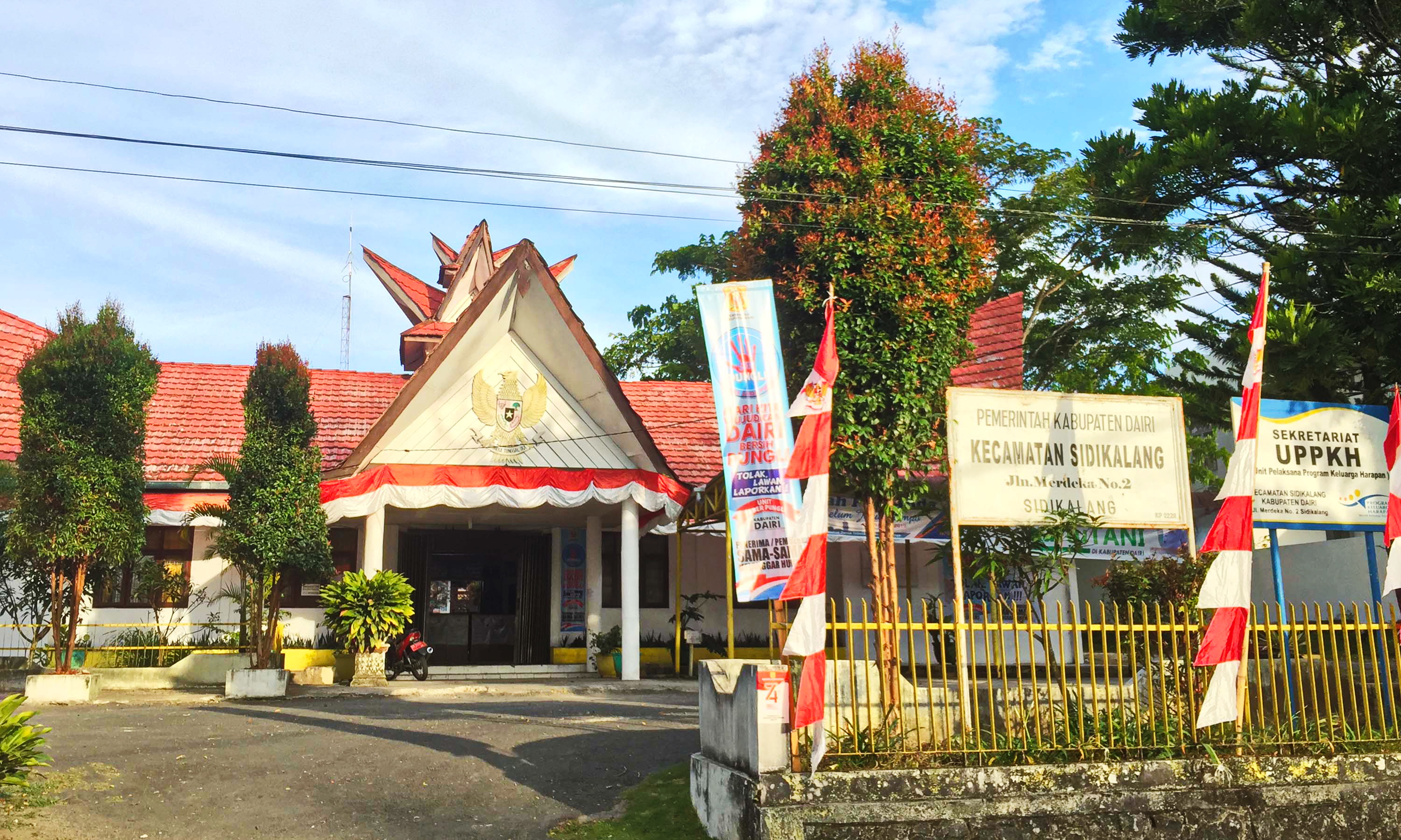
Government office in Sidikalang

Sidikalang is a town in North Sumatra province of Indonesia and it is the seat (capital) of Dairi Regency. Sidikalang is very well known for its coffee.

== Climate ==
Climate data for Sidikalang (elevation 1,066 m)
Month	Jan	Feb	Mar	Apr	May	Jun	Jul	Aug	Sep	Oct	Nov	Dec	Year
Mean daily maximum °C (°F)	26.2 (79.2)	26.8 (80.2)	26.8 (80.2)	26.9 (80.4)	27 (81)	26.8 (80.2)	26.4 (79.5)	26.3 (79.3)	25.8 (78.4)	25.5 (77.9)	25.4 (77.7)	25.8 (78.4)	26.3 (79.4)
Daily mean °C (°F)	21.1 (70.0)	21.4 (70.5)	21.5 (70.7)	21.8 (71.2)	21.8 (71.2)	21.4 (70.5)	21 (70)	21 (70)	21 (70)	21 (70)	20.9 (69.6)	21.1 (70.0)	21.3 (70.3)
Mean daily minimum °C (°F)	16.1 (61.0)	16 (61)	16.3 (61.3)	16.7 (62.1)	16.6 (61.9)	16.1 (61.0)	15.7 (60.3)	15.8 (60.4)	16.2 (61.2)	16.6 (61.9)	16.5 (61.7)	16.4 (61.5)	16.3 (61.3)
Average precipitation mm (inches)	194 (7.6)	194 (7.6)	218 (8.6)	279 (11.0)	196 (7.7)	93 (3.7)	98 (3.9)	176 (6.9)	185 (7.3)	287 (11.3)	315 (12.4)	325 (12.8)	2,560 (100.8)
Source 1: Climate-Data.org
Source 2: Deutscher Wetterdienst

== Notable people ==
- Bonar Sianturi (1944–2022), former Regent of Sintang (1989–1994)
