= Usman Ja'far =

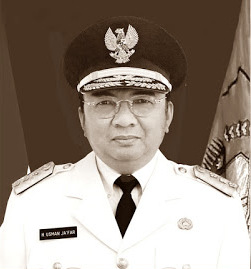
- Usman Ja'far as governor

Governor of West Kalimantan
- In office 13 January 2003 – 14 January 2008
- Preceded by: Aspar Aswin
- Succeeded by: Cornelis

Member of the People's Representative Council
- In office 1 October 2009 – 15 May 2015
- Succeeded by: Firmansyah Mardanus

Personal details
- Born: 10 September 1951 Sekadau, Kalimantan, Indonesia
- Died: 15 May 2015 (aged 63) Jakarta, Indonesia
- Party: United Development Party

Usman Ja'far (10 September 1951 – 15 May 2015) was an Indonesian politician and businessman who served as the Governor of West Kalimantan between 2003 and 2008, and as a member of the People's Representative Council from 2009 until his death in 2015.

== Early life and education ==
Usman Ja'far was born in Sekadau, today part of West Kalimantan, on 10 September 1951. His father died when he was five, and he completed elementary and middle school in Sekadau. When he enrolled at high school in Pontianak, he lived with his uncle Abdussjukur, an Indonesian National Party politician who at that time served as speaker of the provincial legislature. His uncle was relocated to Jakarta after six months when he was elected to the People's Representative Council (DPR), the lower house of Indonesia's parliament, and Usman Ja'far followed him and continued his education there. He then enrolled at a management academy, graduating in 1974.

== Retail career ==
By 1974, he was working as an accounting staff in Jakarta, being promoted to his company's accounting and purchasing department by 1977. He was then hired as general manager of PT Pasaraya Tosersajaya, a department store company, where he worked from 1981 to 1991. In 1992, he was appointed as a director of the company. It was one of the largest retail chains in Indonesia at the time. He was eventually appointed to lead a number of companies owned by businessman Abdul Latief, and also as the president director of Lativi. He was particularly well-known in the retail industry, and was considered a pioneer in the market.

== Political career ==
=== Governor of West Kalimantan ===
He entered politics and ran for governor of West Kalimantan in 2002, with the endorsement of the United Development Party. In the voting by the West Kalimantan Regional People's Representative Council, Usman Ja'far and his running mate Laurentius Herman Kadir managed to secure 32 of 54 votes to win the election. He was the first locally born governor to be elected in West Kalimantan in nearly forty years. They were sworn in on 13 January 2003. The pair represented the ethnic composition of the province: Usman Ja'far was an ethnically Malay Muslim, while Kadir was a Dayak Christian. In his reelection bid, however, he lost to Cornelis in the 2007 direct election, winning 659,279 votes to Cornelis' 930,679.

=== People's Representative Council ===
After the end of his tenure as governor, Usman Ja'far successfully ran for election to the DPR in the 2009 election, being elected as a representative of West Kalimantan with 81,963 votes. He was elected for his second term in 2014. During his tenure in DPR, he had served as a member of the council's honour board.

== Death ==
Usman Ja'far died on 15 May 2015 at Jakarta's Medistra Hospital from heart disease after several days of treatment. He was buried the same day at San Diego Hills cemetery. Shortly prior to his death, Usman Ja'far had been investigated as a suspect for graft. Under suspicion of misusing Rp 22 billion in social aid funds, Usman Ja'far was questioned for 12 hours by police, before falling comatose after a bypass surgery several days after in March 2015.
