= Specialized Unit for Special Tactics =

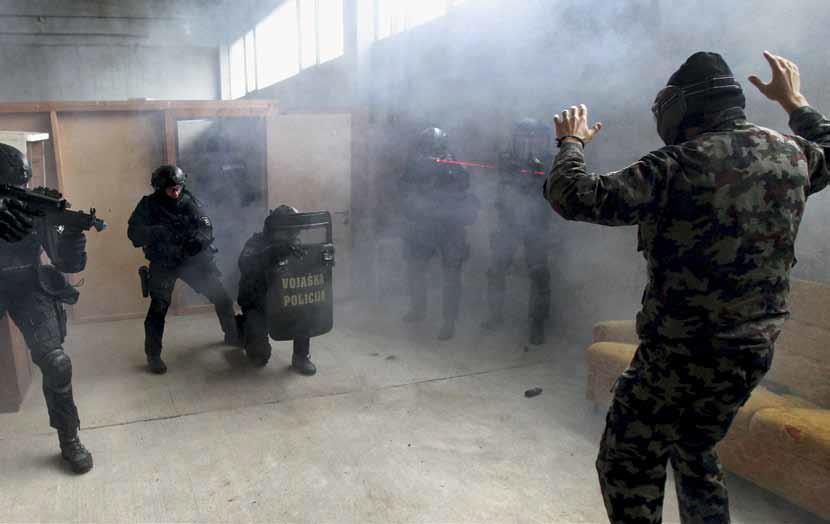
Specialized Unit for Special Tactics in a training exercise.

The Specialized Unit for Special Tactics (Slovenian: Posebna Enota za Specialno Taktiko (PEST; eng. "FIST")) is a special forces unit of the Slovenian Military Police.

PEST is a military and special forces component of the Special Military Police Unit (SMPU) of Slovenian Armed Forces. This is a small platoon-sized unit, trained and equipped for special operations such as: Counter-Terrorism, Combat Search and Rescue, Maritime Opposed and Unopposed Boarding Operations, Deep Reconnaissance, Direct Action, Sabotage, Unconventional Warfare, etc.

== Vehicles ==
- BOV-M
- Valuk
- HMMWV
