= Cornelis (Indonesian politician) =

Indonesian politician

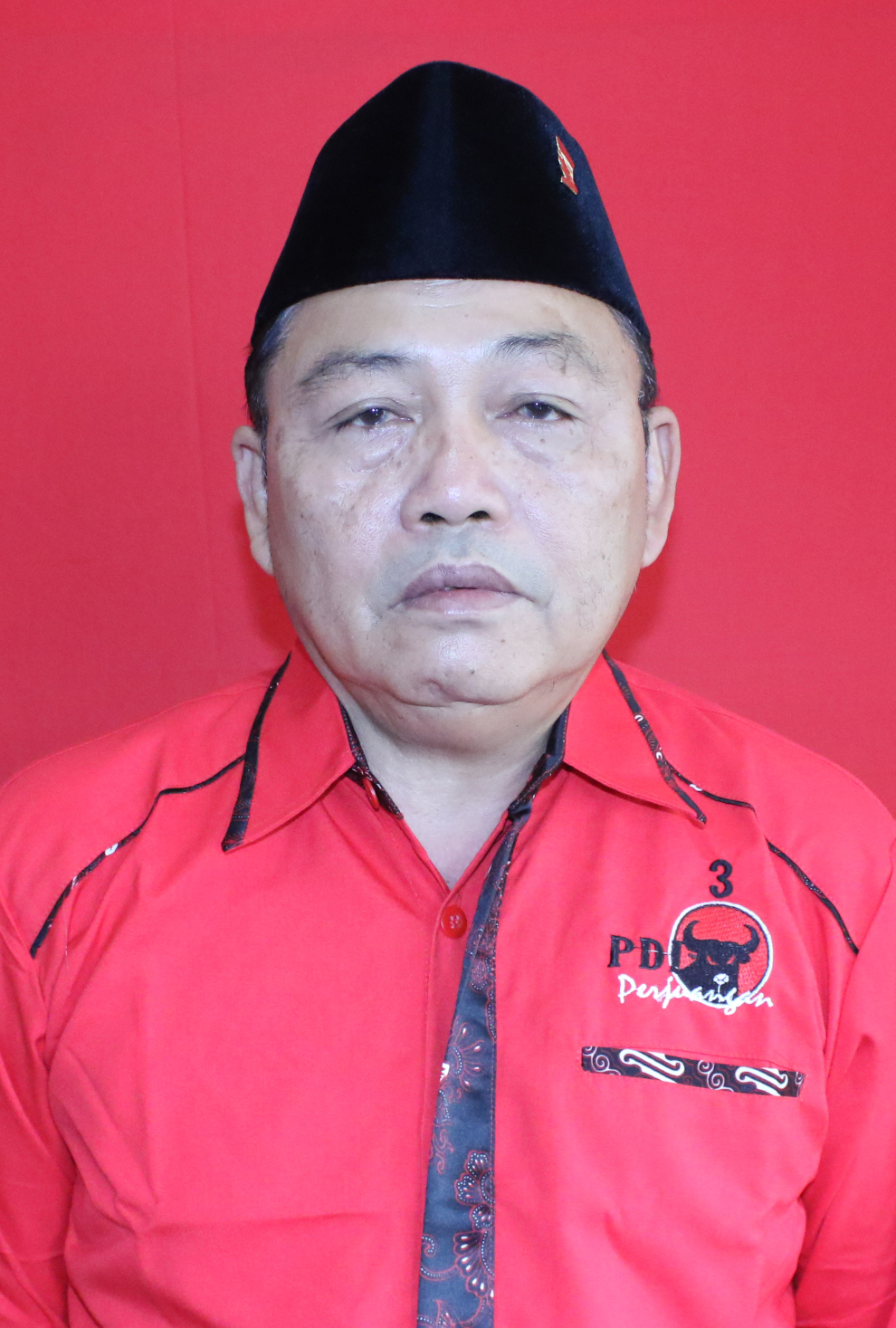

Governor of West Kalimantan
- In office 14 January 2008 – 14 January 2018
- President: Susilo Bambang Yudhoyono; Joko Widodo
- Deputy: Christiandy Sanjaya
- Preceded by: Usman Ja'far
- Succeeded by: Dody Riyadmadji (acting); Sutarmidji

Personal details
- Born: 27 July 1953 (age 72) Sanggau, West Kalimantan, Indonesia
- Party: PDI-P
- Spouse: Frederika
- Children: 2, including Karolin

Cornelis (born 27 July 1953) is a West Kalimantan governor from 2008 to 2018. He got his master's degree in law from a university in Pontianak in 2004. He is the second Dayak governor in the province after Oevaang Oeray.

He has been accused by Agus Setiadji, leader of the United Malay People, of sidelining Malays and only giving government jobs and funds to Dayaks. He was reelected once in 2013, and his second term expired on 14 January 2018.

Political offices
| Preceded by Usman Ja'far | Governor of West Kalimantan; 2008–2018 | Succeeded by Sutarmidji |
| Preceded by Agus Salim | Regent of Landak; 2001–2008 | Succeeded by Adrianus Asia Sidot |
