= Parjoko Suryokusumo =

Indonesian politician (1940–2007)

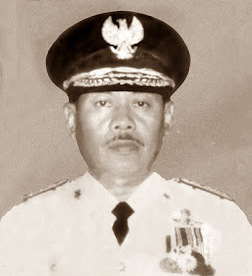
- Suryokusumo as Governor

Governor of West Kalimantan
- In office 8 January 1988 – 12 January 1993
- Preceded by: Soedjiman
- Succeeded by: Aspar Aswin

Personal details
- Born: 5 January 1939; Purwokerto, Dutch East Indies
- Died: 21 October 1994 (aged 55); Jakarta, Indonesia

Military service
- Allegiance: Indonesia
- Branch/service: Indonesian Army
- Rank: Major general

Parjoko Suryokusumo (5 January 1939 – 21 October 1994) was an Indonesian military officer who also served as the Governor of West Kalimantan between 1988 and 1993. Suryokusumo was born in Purwokerto, today in Central Java province. During his military career, he served as head of the cavalry center in Bandung, and then as chief of staff before becoming commander of the Tanjungpura Military District in Kalimantan. When he held the rank of brigadier general, he appointed as governor of West Kalimantan and was sworn in on 8 January 1988. During his tenure, he allocated funding to renovate and improve the Equator Monument, in addition to creating a duplicate to be placed in a more accessible location.

He had two sons and a daughter when he was sworn in as governor. Suryokusumo received local support for a second term, but he refused to extend his governorship. His tenure ended on 12 January 1993, when he was replaced by Aspar Aswin. By that time, he had been promoted to major general. He died at Pertamina Central Hospital in Jakarta on 21 October 1994 due to an illness.
