= Aspar Aswin =

Indonesian politician (1940–2007)

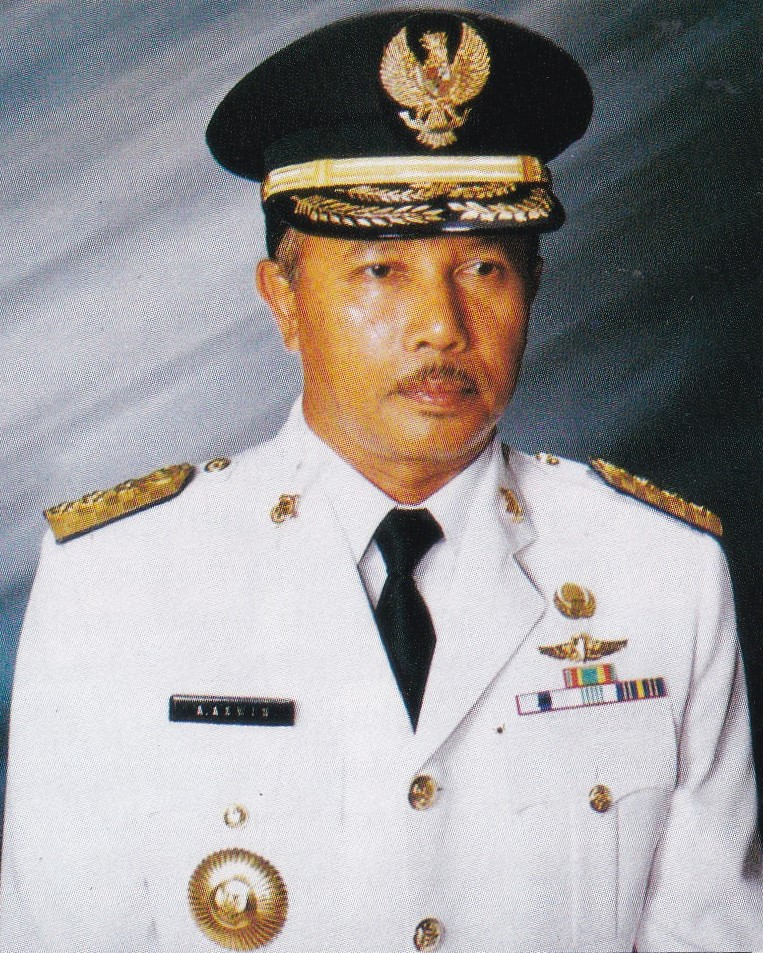

Governor of West Kalimantan
- In office 12 January 1993 – 12 January 2003
- Preceded by: Parjoko Suryokusumo
- Succeeded by: Usman Ja'far

3rd Vice Governor of Bali
- In office 2 September 1989 – 12 January 1993
- Preceded by: I Dewa Gde Oka
- Succeeded by: Ahim Abdurahim

Personal details
- Born: 13 April 1940 Samarinda, Dutch East Indies
- Died: 19 December 2007 (aged 67) Pontianak, West Kalimantan, Indonesia

Military service
- Allegiance: Indonesia
- Branch/service: Indonesian Army
- Rank: Major general

Aspar Aswin (13 April 1940 – 19 December 2007) was an Indonesian politician and military officer who served two terms as Governor of West Kalimantan between 1993 and 2003 and was also Vice Governor of Bali. His second term as governor occurred during the early Reform era, which saw significant ethnic tensions in West Kalimantan and attempts to remove him from power.

== Early life ==
Aswin was born in Samarinda on 13 April 1940, as the fifth of nine living siblings. After graduating from high school he applied to several universities, and while awaiting for responses, he also applied to and was accepted in the Indonesian Military Academy, from which he graduated in 1963.

== Career ==
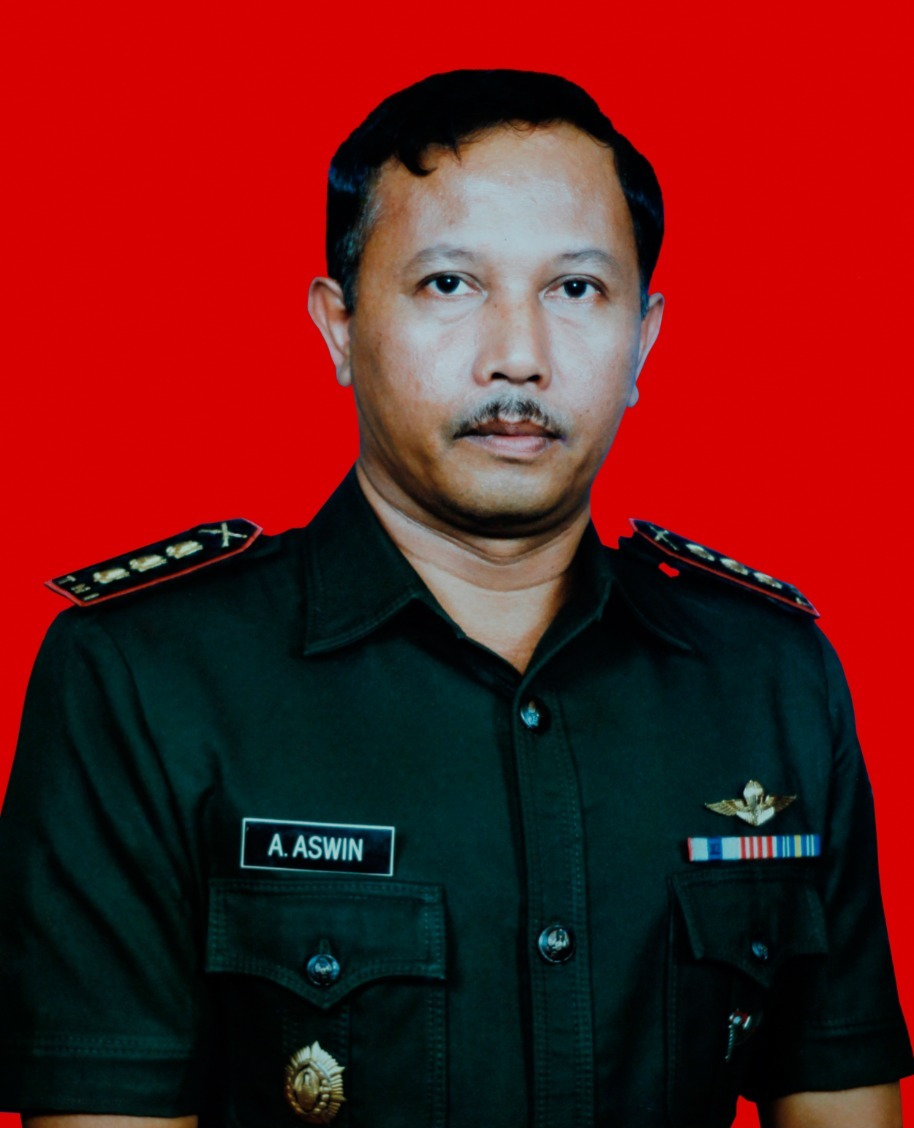
Aswin as a colonel, c. late 1980s

Within the Indonesian Army, Aswin was first assigned as a platoon commander within Kodam Siliwangi, until he was reassigned to Kostrad in 1971. In 1973, he began serving in the Regional Training Regiments, gradually rising up the ranks until he became a regimental commander based in Kodam Udayana in 1985. Aswin was also appointed as a member of the People's Consultative Assembly (MPR) representing West Kalimantan in 1987, but he was honorably discharged from the assembly on 16 November 1989. At that time, he held the rank of colonel. Before his removal from MPR, he was sworn in as Vice Governor of Bali on 2 September 1989. He was promoted to brigadier general on 11 October 1991.

He was then elected as governor of West Kalimantan, being sworn in on 12 January 1993. He was reelected for the 1998–2003 term, and was sworn in for his second term on 12 January 1998. He was promoted to major general in his first term, on 8 April 1994. In his second term, the province of West Kalimantan saw an increase in the number of regencies, with Bengkayang and Landak regencies being split off in 1999. Aswin had previously wrote in 1998 that West Kalimantan would need to be split into fourteen regencies, compared to six at the time of his writing.

During the Sambas riots of 1999, the provincial government under Aswin established a refugee center for Madurese refugees, allocating around 12,500 hectares for permanent resettlement of the displaced Madurese. The riots were concurrent with the national political upheaval following the fall of Suharto, and in that period there were routine demonstrations by students in the provincial capital of Pontianak calling for Aswin's resignation, as he was seen as a representation of the fallen New Order regime. A student was killed during one of these demonstrations in 2000, triggering a wave of condemnations and causing political tensions to escalate. By October, the central government had leaned towards removing Aswin from office. However, on 25 October, a major riot broke out between Pontianak's Malay and Madurese populations, and the immediate attempt to impeach Aswin was shelved. At the end, Aswin held on to the gubernatorial seat until the end of his second term.

After the end of his tenure, Aswin became one of the founding members of the People's Conscience Party.

== Death ==
Aswin died in the early morning on 19 December 2007, after abruptly collapsing in his home several hours earlier. In the days prior to his death, he had been travelling from Jakarta before continuing on to Ketapang Regency for Hanura party affairs, with many people familiar with Aswin speculating that his death was caused by overexhaustion. Following a request he made prior to death, his body was buried in Temanggung.
