= Pasar Rebo =

Coordinates: 6.3277°S 106.8545°E

Pasar Rebo (literally Wednesday Market in Betawi) is a district (kecamatan) of East Jakarta, Indonesia. The boundaries of Pasar Rebo District are the Ciliwung to the west and north; and Bogor Raya Road and Cipinang River to the east. The city of Depok is located to the south of Pasar Rebo District.

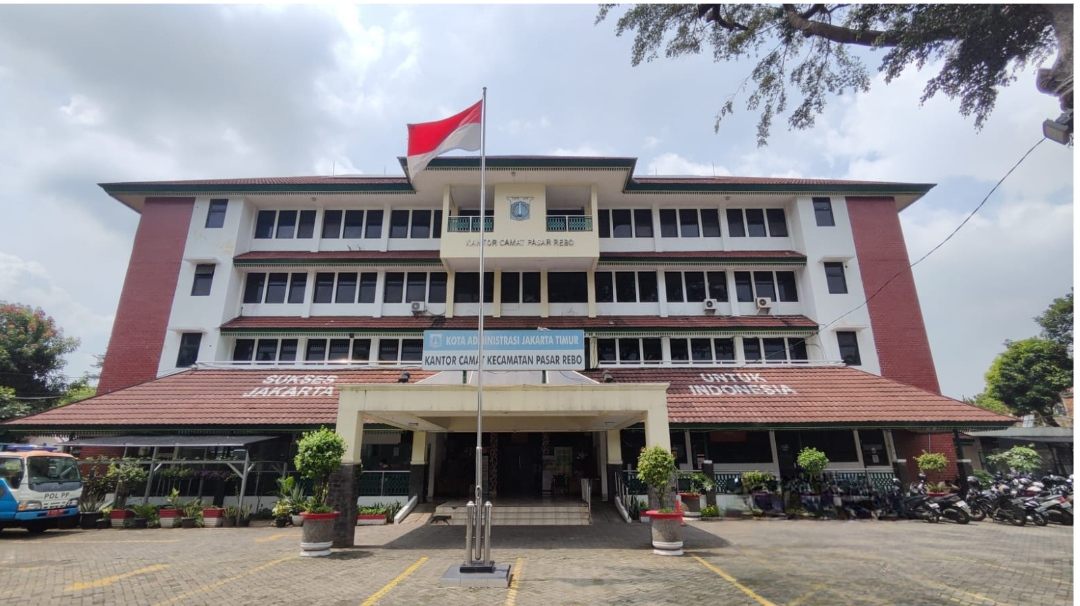
Pasar Rebo Sub-district office

Geographically Pasar Rebo consists of dry lands and rice fields. It is the district with the third highest percentage of greenery in Jakarta (54.8%, highest percentage of greenery is in Cakung (68.1%) and Cilincing Districts (64.2%)).

== Kelurahan (administrative village) ==
The District of Pasar Rebo is divided into five administrative villages (kelurahan):

- Pekayon - area code 13710
- Kampung Gedong - area code 13760
- Cijantung - area code 13770
- Kampung Baru - area code 13780
- Kalisari - area code 13790
