= List of mines in Indonesia =

This list of mines in Indonesia is subsidiary to the list of mines article and lists working, defunct and future mines in the country and is organised by the primary mineral output. For practical purposes stone, marble and other quarries may be included in this list.

Mine	Product(s)	Coordinates	Owner	Dates	Comments
Ombilin	Coal				Open pit
Sebuku	Coal		Straits Asia Resources		
GAM	Coking coal				
Pasir	Coking coal		Kideco		
Buli	Nickel				
Konawe Utara	Nickel				
Sorowako	Nickel		Vale Indonesia		
Beutong	Copper				
Batu Hijau	Copper and gold		Newmont Nusa Tenggara		Open pit
Grasberg	Copper and gold		Freeport Indonesia		Open pit
Bangka Island	Tin		Timah		
Buton Island	Asphalt		Buton Asphalt Indonesia		
Lhokseumawe	Natural gas		Arun Natural Gas Liquefaction		
Sangatta	Coal		Kaltim Prima Coal		
Kencana	Gold and silver				
Pongkor	Gold		Aneka Tambang		Underground
Halmahera	Nickel		Eramet		
Senakin	Coal		Arutmin Indonesia		
Satui	Coal		Arutmin Indonesia		
Asam-Asam	Coal		Arutmin Indonesia		
Batulicin	Coal		Arutmin Indonesia		
Dumai	Petroleum		Chevron Pacific Indonesia		
Bintan Island	Bauxite		Aneka Tambang		
Tayan	Bauxite				
Gosowong	Gold				Underground
Cempaka	Diamond				
Martapura	Diamond				
Bengalon	Coal				
North Konawe	Nickel				
Kendawangan	Bauxite				
Peranap	Coal				
Dairi	Zinc and lead		Dairi Prima Mineral		
