= Kerajaan =

- District
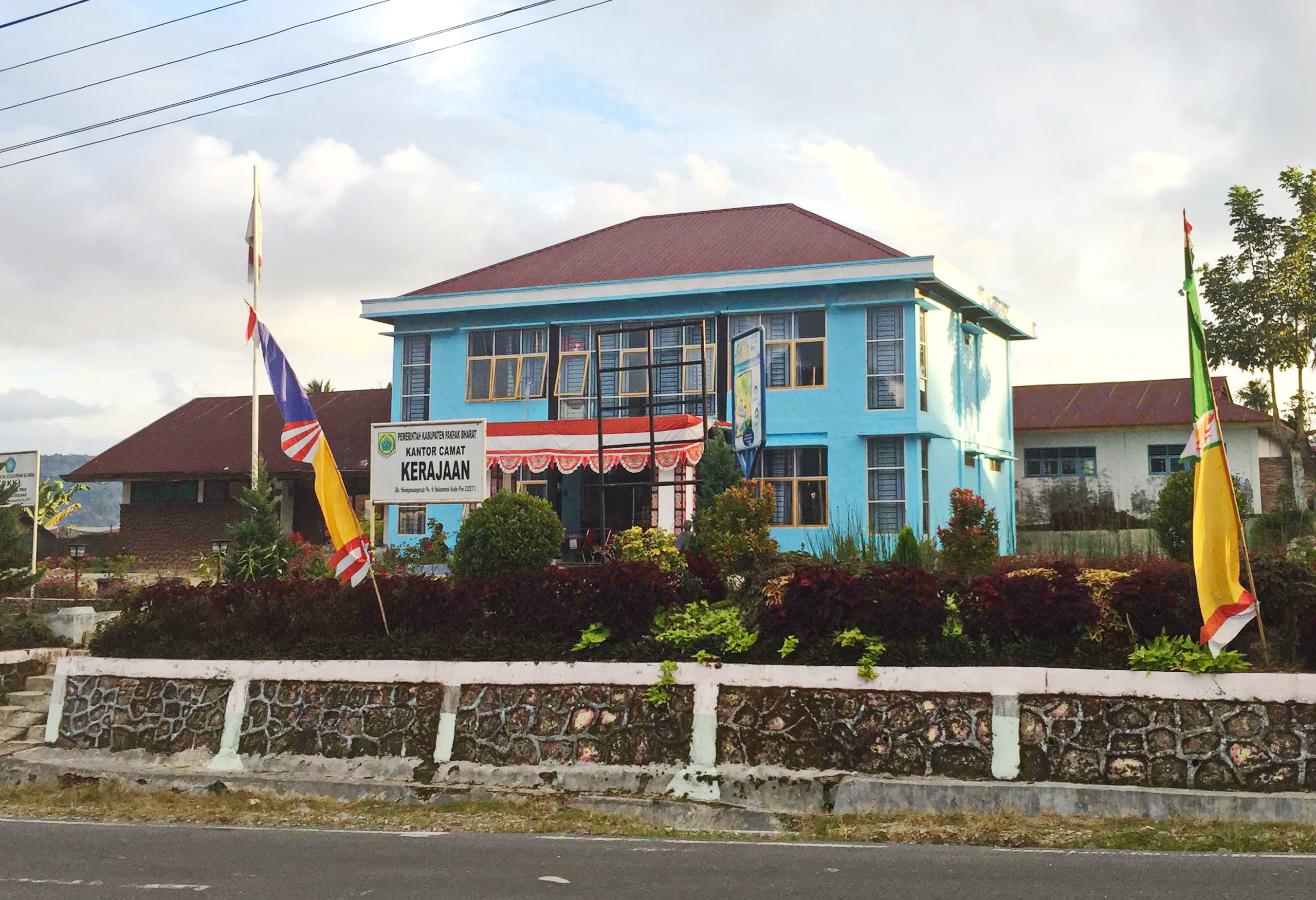
- Kerajaan District Office

- Location map of Kerajaan district in Pakpak Bharat Regency
- Country: Indonesia
- Province: North Sumatra
- Regency: Pakpak Bharat
- District seat: Sukaramai

Area
  - Total: 139.26 km^{2} (53.77 sq mi)

Population (2020)
  - Total: 10,078
  - Density: 72.368/km^{2} (187.43/sq mi)
- Time zone: UTC+7 (IST)
- Postal code: 22271

Kerajaan is an administrative district (kecamatan) in Pakpak Bharat Regency, North Sumatra Province, Indonesia.

== History ==
In 2003, Kerajaan was one of three districts that pioneered the expansion of Pakpak Bharat Regency from Dairi Regency.

== Geography ==
Map of village area divisions in Kerajaan district

Kerajaan district consists of 10 villages (desa), namely:

- Kuta Dame
- Kuta Meriah
- Kuta Saga
- Majanggut I
- Majanggut II
- Pardomuan
- Parpulungan
- Perduhapen
- Sukaramai
- Surung Mersada
