= Dairi Prima Mineral =

Indonesian mining company

- Logo
- Industry: Zinc mining
- Headquarters: Indonesia
- Key people: Suseno Kramadibrata (president commissioner); Gong XueDong (president director); Ryno Chandra Mulya (technical director)
- Website: www.ptdpm.co.id

Dairi Prima Mineral, officially PT Dairi Prima Mineral, is an Indonesian metal mining company and the owner of the Dairi mine in the Dairi Regency of North Sumatra, Indonesia.

== Activities ==
Dairi Prima Mineral is an Indonesian metal mining company and the owner of the Dairi mine in the Dairi Regency of North Sumatra, Indonesia.

== Organization ==
Key staff include president commissioner Suseno Kramadibrata, president director Gong XueDong, and technical director Ryno Chandra Mulya.

== Ownership ==
In 2021 DW News and 2023 The Guardian reported, major shareholders in the company as the Indonesian company Bumi Resources Minerals and China Non-Ferrous Metal Industry’s Foreign Engineering and Construction Co., Ltd., which is a subdivision the Government of China owned China Nonferrous Metal Mining Group. As of April 2023, the official website of the mine indicated that shareholders are 51% NFC Hongkong and 49% PT Bumi Resources Minerals Tbk.

== See also ==
- Mining in Asia
- Zinc mining
