= Peranap coal mine =

Coal mine in East Kalimantan, Indonesia

Peranap Coal Mine
- Location: East Kalimantan, Indonesia
- Products: Coking coal

The Peranap Coal Mine is a coal mine located in East Kalimantan. The mine has coal reserves amounting to 1.16 billion tonnes of coking coal, one of the largest coal reserves in Asia and the world.

== See also ==
- List of mines in Indonesia
