= Salak, North Sumatra =

- Town
- Location of Salak in North Sumatra
- Coordinates: 2°33′16.7″N 98°19′25.4″E
- Country: Indonesia
- Province: North Sumatra
- Regency: Pakpak Bharat

Area
  - Total: 245.57 km^{2} (94.82 sq mi)
- Elevation: 922 m (3,025 ft)

Population (2020 Census)
  - Total: 10,057
  - Density: 40.954/km^{2} (106.07/sq mi)
- Time zone: UTC+7 (Western Indonesian Time)
- Area code: +62627

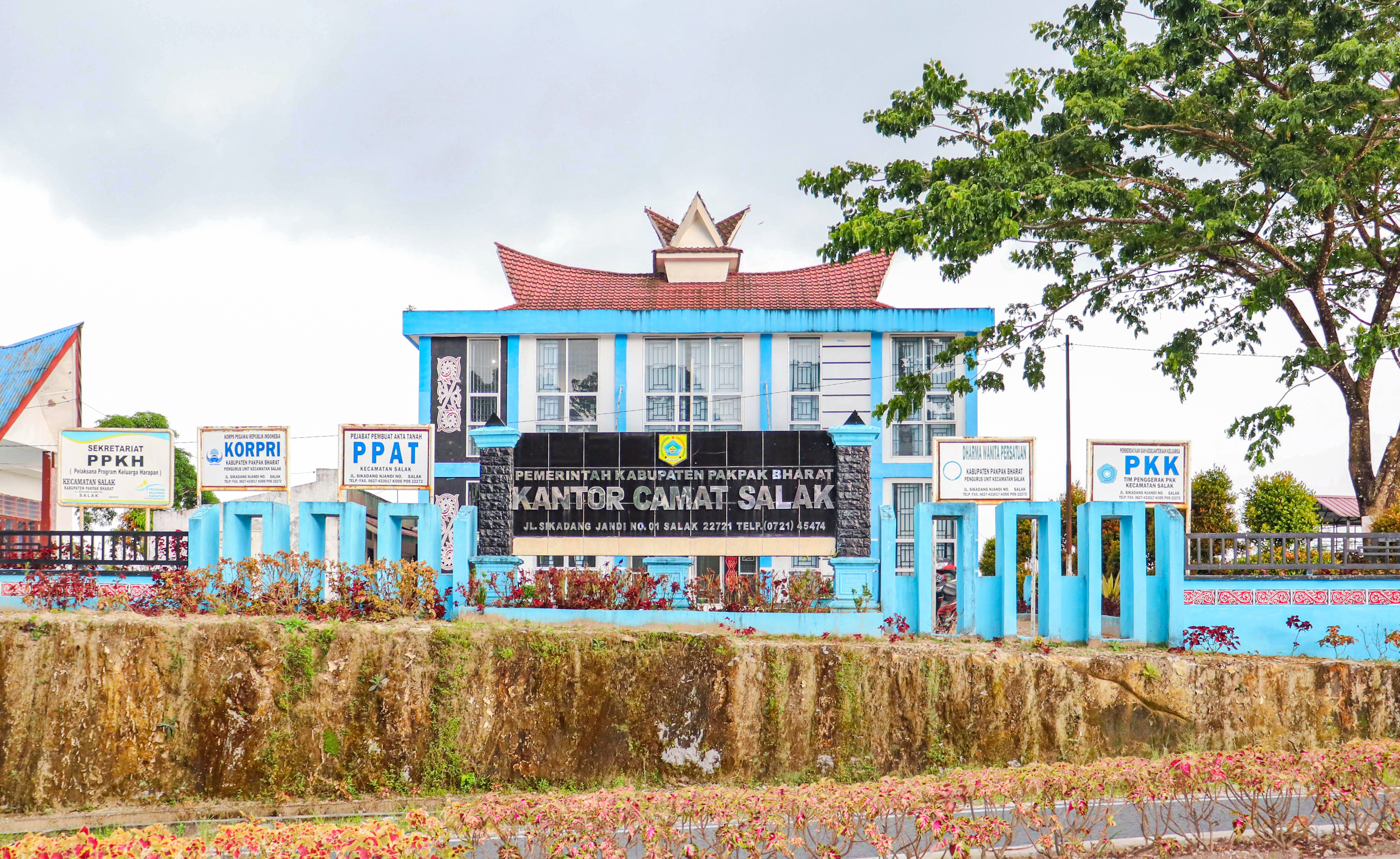
Office of Salek, Pakpak Bharat

Salak is a town and district in North Sumatra province of Indonesia, the capital of Pakpak Bharat Regency.

== Climate ==
Salak has an elevation moderated tropical rainforest climate (Af) with heavy rainfall year-round.

Climate data for Salak
Month	Jan	Feb	Mar	Apr	May	Jun	Jul	Aug	Sep	Oct	Nov	Dec	Year
Mean daily maximum °C (°F)	27.0 (80.6)	27.5 (81.5)	27.5 (81.5)	27.5 (81.5)	27.7 (81.9)	27.5 (81.5)	27.2 (81.0)	27.0 (80.6)	26.5 (79.7)	26.2 (79.2)	26.1 (79.0)	26.5 (79.7)	27.0 (80.6)
Daily mean °C (°F)	21.9 (71.4)	22.1 (71.8)	22.2 (72.0)	22.4 (72.3)	22.5 (72.5)	22.1 (71.8)	21.9 (71.4)	21.8 (71.2)	21.7 (71.1)	21.7 (71.1)	21.6 (70.9)	21.8 (71.2)	22.0 (71.6)
Mean daily minimum °C (°F)	16.8 (62.2)	16.7 (62.1)	17.0 (62.6)	17.4 (63.3)	17.4 (63.3)	16.8 (62.2)	16.6 (61.9)	16.6 (61.9)	16.9 (62.4)	17.3 (63.1)	17.2 (63.0)	17.1 (62.8)	17.0 (62.6)
Average rainfall mm (inches)	229 (9.0)	183 (7.2)	254 (10.0)	281 (11.1)	199 (7.8)	127 (5.0)	108 (4.3)	156 (6.1)	220 (8.7)	302 (11.9)	307 (12.1)	280 (11.0)	2,646 (104.2)
Source: Climate-Data.org
