= Tinada =

- District
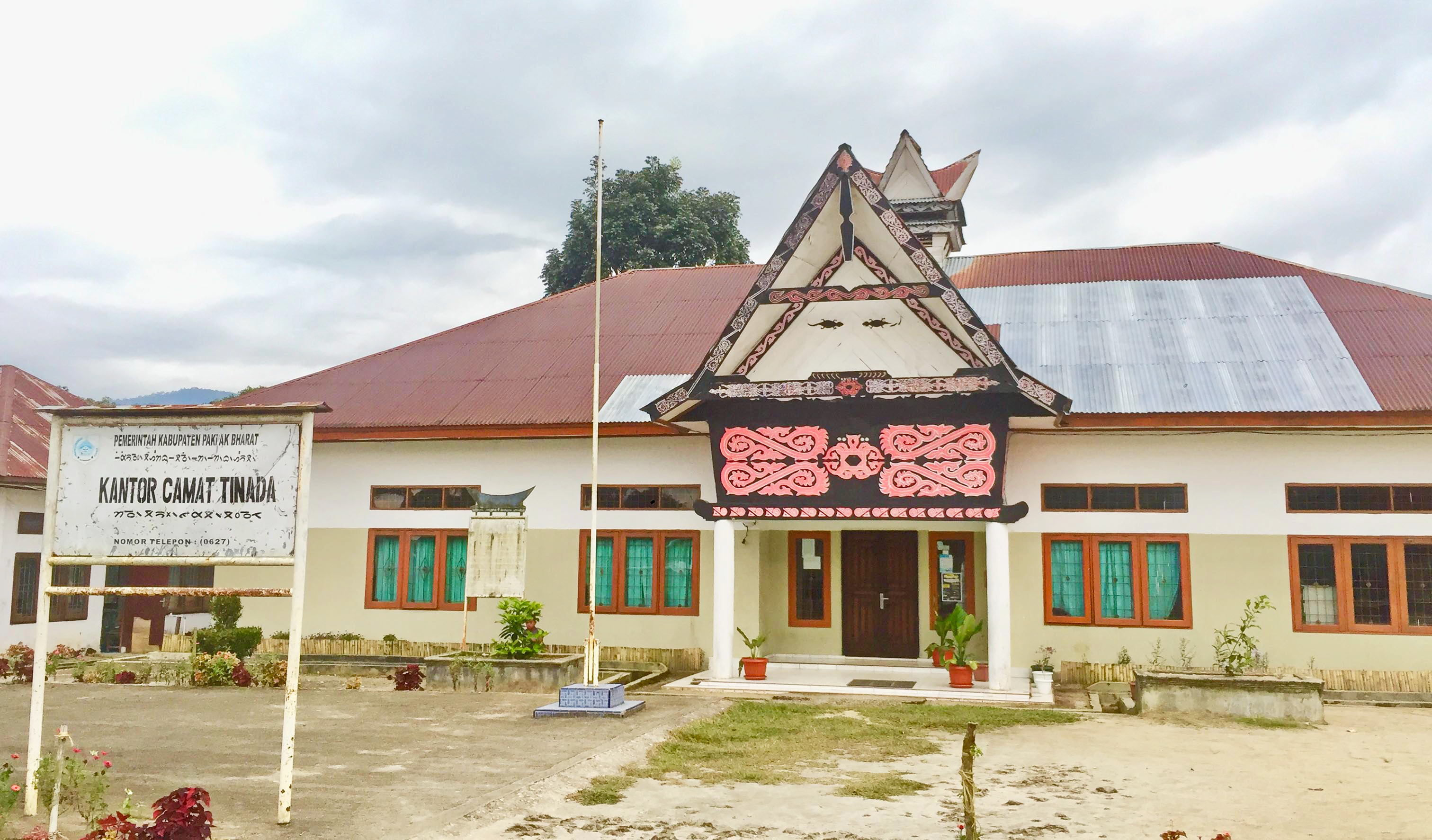
- Tinada District Office

- Location map of Tinada district in Pakpak Bharat Regency
- Country: Indonesia
- Province: North Sumatra
- Regency: Pakpak Bharat
- District seat: Tinada

Area
  - Total: 58.42 km^{2} (22.56 sq mi)

Population (2020)
  - Total: 4,827
  - Density: 82.63/km^{2} (214.0/sq mi)
- Time zone: UTC+7 (IDT)
- Postal code: 22277

Tinada is an administrative district (kecamatan) in Pakpak Bharat Regency, North Sumatra Province, Indonesia.

== Geography ==
Map of village area divisions in Tinada district

Tinada consists of 6 villages (desa), namely:

- Buluh Tellang,
- Kuta Babo
- Mahala
- Prongil
- Silima Kuta
- Tinada
