= Dairi Regency =

Regency in North Sumatra, Indonesia

Coordinates: 3°N 99.1667°E

Dairi Regency Kabupaten Dairi
- Regency
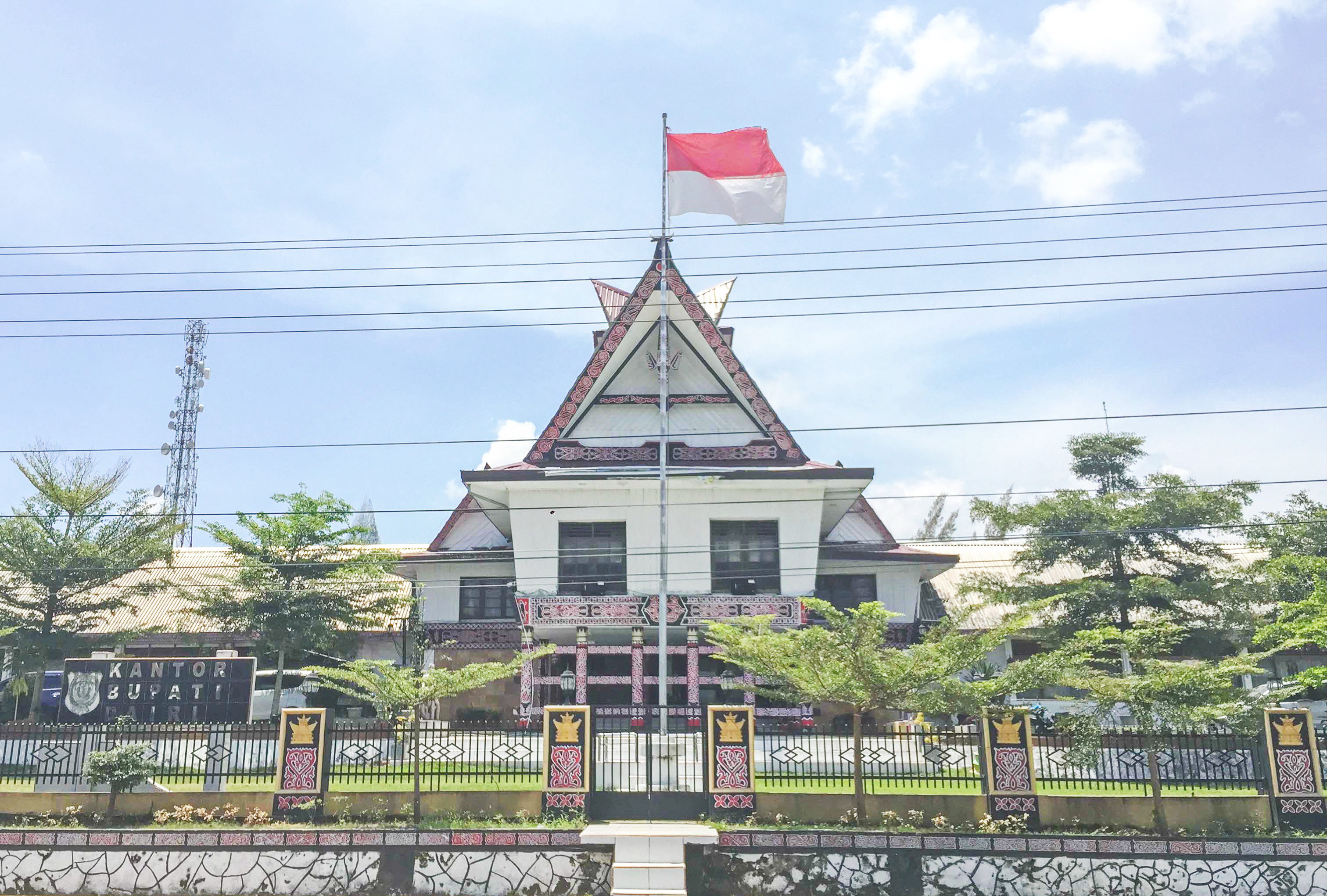
- Regent's office of Dairi Regency

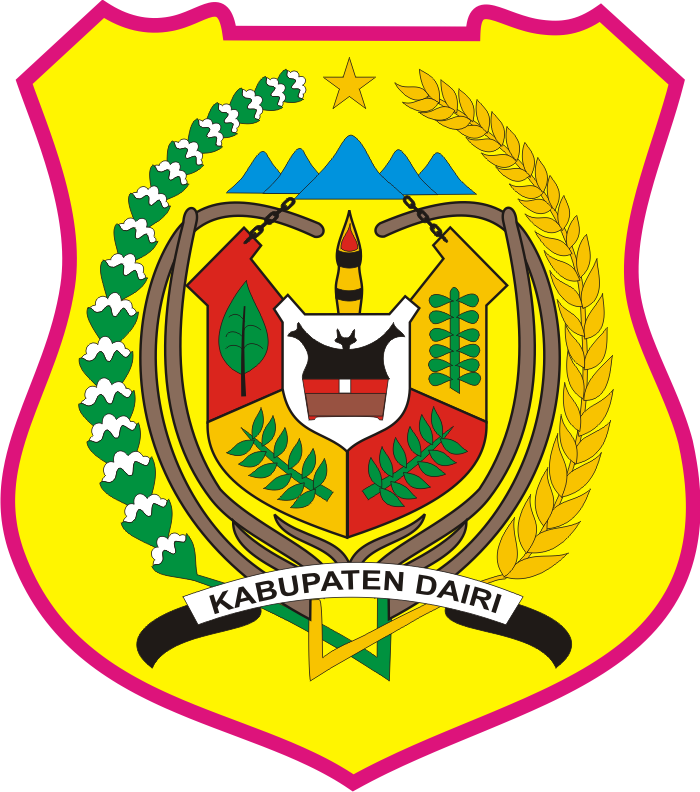
- Coat of arms

- Country: Indonesia
- Province: North Sumatra
- Regency seat: Sidikalang

Government
  - Regent: Vickner Sinaga
  - Vice Regent: Wahyu Daniel Sagala
  - Chairman of Council of Representatives: Sabam Sibarani (Golkar)
  - Vice Chairmen of Council of Representatives: Alvensius Tondang (PDI-P) and Wanseptember Situmorang (Partai Demokrat)

Area
  - Total: 1,927.8 km^{2} (744.3 sq mi)

Population (mid 2025 estimate)
  - Total: 336,403
  - Density: 174.50/km^{2} (451.96/sq mi)
- Time zone: UTC+7 (WIB)
- Website: www.dairikab.go.id

Dairi Regency is an inland regency on the western shore of Lake Toba in North Sumatra Province of Indonesia. The regency was created on 23 September 1964 from what were previously the north-western districts of North Tapanuli Regency; however the southern districts of this new regency were in turn split off on 25 February 2003 to form the new Pakpak Bharat Regency. The reduced regency covers an area of 1,927.80 square kilometres (744.33 mi^{2}) and it had a population of 269,848 people at the 2010 Census and 308,764 at the 2020 Census; the official estimate as of mid 2025 was 336,403 (comprising 168,924 males and 167,479 females). Its administrative seat is at the town of Sidikalang.

== Geography and climate ==
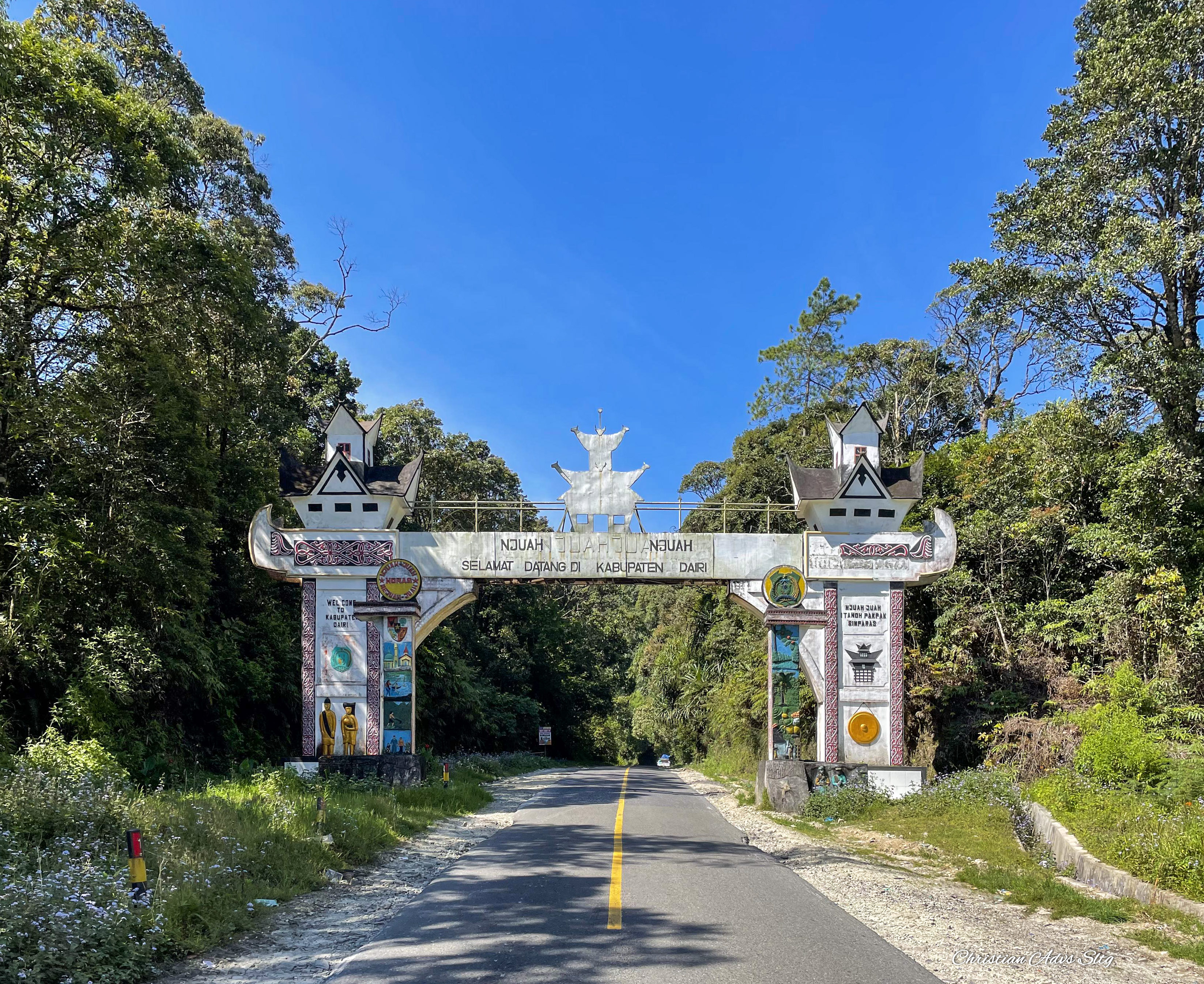
Welcome gate to Dairi Regency

Dairi is mostly hills and mountains, averaging 700 to 1,250 metres (2,300 to 4,100 ft) above sea level. It has a tropical rainforest climate, with the heaviest rainfall between September and May.

== Demographics ==
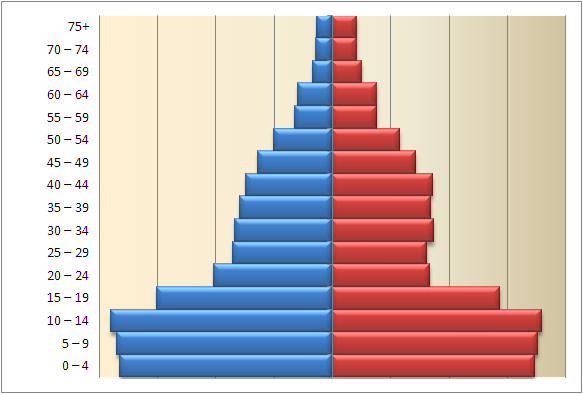
Population pyramid for Dairi as of 2008; males are in blue and females are in red

A 2008 estimate by the Dairi government put Dairi's population at 271,983, with a sex ratio of 99.43. Of the population, 39.96% is under the age of 14. At the 2010 Census the population was 269,848, at the 2020 Census it was 308,764 and for mid 2025 it was estimated as 336,403.

== Bordering territories ==
The Dairi Regency is bordered to the north by Karo Regency, to the east by Samosir Regency and Lake Toba, to the south by Pakpak Bharat Regency, and to the west by Aceh Province (Southeast Aceh Regency and the City of Subulussalam).

== Administrative districts ==
Dairi Regency is divided into fifteen districts (kecamatan), tabulated below with their areas and their populations at the 2010 Census and the 2020 Census, together with the official estimates as of mid 2025. The table also includes the locations of the district administrative centres, the number of administrative villages in each district (totaling 161 rural desa and 8 urban kelurahan), and its post code.

Kode Wilayah	Name of District (kecamatan)	Area in km^{2}	Pop'n Census 2010	Pop'n Census 2020	Pop'n Estim. mid 2025	Admin centre	No. of villages	Post code
12.11.01	Sidikalang	70.67	48,646	53,433	58,727	Sidikalang	11 ^{(a)}	22211 -22219
12.11.13	Berampu	40.85	7,908	9,031	9,663	Berampu	5	22251
12.11.15	Sitinjo	53.15	11,235	14,429	15,780	Sitinjo	4 ^{(b)}	22219
12.11.10	Parbuluan	235.40	20,637	25,236	28,642	Sigalingging	11	22282
12.11.02	Sumbul	192.58	39,365	45,606	48,408	Sumbul	19 ^{(c)}	22284
12.11.14	Silahisabungan	75.62	4,471	5,242	6,233	Silalahi	5	22280
12.11.05	Silima Pungga-Pungga	88.35	12,651	14,448	15,950	Parongil	16 ^{(d)}	22262
12.11.11	Lae Parira	42.75	13,567	14,526	16,108	Lae Parira	9	22281
12.11.04	Siempat Nempu	60.15	17,979	20,241	21,711	Buntu Raja	13	22261
12.11.07	Siempat Nempu Hulu (Upper Siempat Nempu)	93.93	17,663	20,183	21,584	Silumboyah	12	22254
12.11.08	Siempat Nempu Hilir (Lower Siempat Nempu)	105.62	10,423	11,746	12,782	Sopobutar	10	22263
12.11.03	Tigalingga	197.00	21,444	24,428	25,993	Tigalingga	14	22252
12.11.12	Gunung; Sitember	77.00	9,090	10,714	11,349	Gunung; Sitember	8	22250
12.11.09	Pegagan Hilir (Lower Pegagan)	155.33	14,740	16,740	18,803	Tiga Baru	13	22283
12.11.06	Tanah Pinem	439.40	20,234	22,761	24,670	Kuta Buluh	19	22253
	Totals	1,927.80	269,848	308,764	336,403	Sidikalang	169	

Notes: (a) comprising five kelurahan (Batang Beruh, Bintang Hulu, Kuta Gambir, Sidiangkat and Sidikalang Kota) and six desa.
(b) including the kelurahan of Panji Dabutar. (c) including the kelurahan of Pegagan Julu I. (d) including the kelurahan of Parongil.

== Coat of arms ==
The coat of arms of Dairi has many connotations. Indonesia's date of independence, 17 August 1945, is indicated by the 17-budded cotton plant on the left side, 8 rattan branches in the center, and 45 seeds of rice on a stalk to the right. The shield in the centre is divided into five, four parts indicating different cash crops important to the area (benzoin resin, coffee, tobacco and patchouli), while the fifth shows a traditional Pakpak Batak house; the house signifies protection. The five point star in the top center signifies the Pancasila-respecting habits of the Dairi people, while the mountains represent tranquility and the chains represent gotong royong, or cooperating and collaborating. The central sharpened bamboo spear represents the Dairi people's struggle for independence.

== History ==
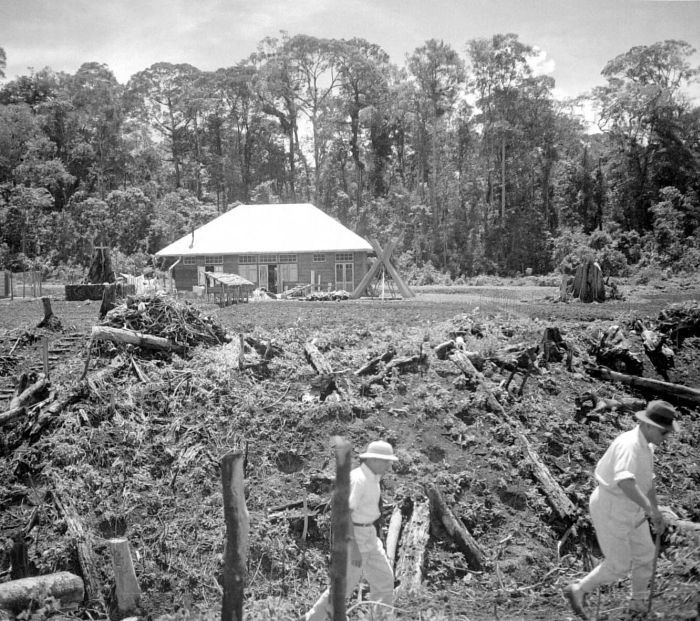
An early Dutch settlement in Dairi

Prior to the arrival of the Dutch East India Company, the people of what is now Dairi lived in traditional adat-regulated communities, with unelected local leaders. After the arrival of the Dutch they established an ethnic-Dutch controleur to be in charge of the Dairi onder afdeling, as well as a native Indonesian demang, or lieutenant. When the Japanese occupied Indonesia beginning in 1942, the Dairi area was also occupied; during this time, local youths were used as forced labour to build the 65 kilometres (40 mi) long Sidikalang road and the Dutch were removed.

After Indonesia's independence, the residents attempted to build a foundation for a new government. However, after the Dutch army recaptured nearby East Sumatra in 1947, they chose a new leader for the Dairi area. Another leader was chosen in 1949; later that year, after the Netherlands and Indonesia signed an agreement for Indonesian independence

== Economy ==
Farming is a large business in Dairi. Major crops in Dairi are coffee, both robusta and arabica, corn, and potatoes. Approximately 6,770 tonnes of robusta coffee are produced every year, in addition to 2,639 tonnes of arabica; corn fields take up 63% of suitable farming land. Other minor trades are damar collecting, fish farming, and rattan.

Since 1997, Dairi Prima Mineral have operated the Dairi mine near the Sopokomil hamlet of Longkotan [id] village in the Silima Pungga-Pungga [id] subdistrict of the regency.
