= Mining in Asia =

Mining in Asia involves the extraction of minerals and metals for commercial sale. However, the industry has its concerns ranging which include concerns about financial stability, labor rights, and the impact on the environment. There are several sustainability pathways that can be followed in the future to build methods to reduce environmental damage and maintain long-term operations.

Work and labor concerns are a pressing matter for this industry: low regulation amongst small mines can sometimes lead to exploitation of child labor and lower than fair wages. Additionally, work safety is not always at the forefront of concerns, which also stems from a lack of regulation for these smaller scale mines.

Pollution is another concern for industry researchers and professionals. The fumes and air waste can contaminate the air, making it hard to breathe and toxic around these areas. Additionally, as the waste mixes with ground water and liquids used for operation, they can pollute the soil and spread toxic materials to nearby water sources and residential areas. Furthermore, they can drastically change the physical features of a landscape, making it hard to utilize land and increasing the risk of flooding.

== Work safety ==
Safety has long been a concern in the mining industry, especially in underground mining. There are many occupational hazards associated with mining, such as mining equipment produces considerable noise and puts miners at risk of hearing loss. Although all miners have right to require a safe and healthy workplace, this can be objectified for some workers. Mining industry has made significant contributions to the growth of gross domestic product (GDP), however, it can pose health and safety threats to the laborers of this industry. In order to effectively address the Occupational Safety and Health (OSH) problems for the miners in Asia, 11 countries discussed this issue in Ulaanbaatar, Mongolia. One of the solutions was to set up a union check inspector in all countries. They could promote institutions to improve working conditions for miners. The government offers a policy called ‘Fitness for Work’ which require companies be responsible for the health of miners. ‘Mine Safety and Health Convention’ (NO.176) was proposed as a core of the occupational safety and health work in 1995. However, few states have ratified Convention No. 176. Philippines is the only Asian member State ratifies the convention. Therefore, the Council decided to hold a two-day seminar in the Asian area to outline good practices for safe mining.

== Illegal labor ==
The main feature of small-scale mining (SSM) is a family business, which means a group of families gather resources together and attempt to find precious metals from known deposits or excavated mines abandoned by large mining companies. According to data statistics, 4 million workers are found to be in Asia who engaged in SSM activities out of 6 million, mostly in China, Philippines and India. The issues brought about by SSM are similar globally and locally. SSM provides a number of career opportunities for women and children who lack of educated and unskilled, most of them live in rural areas and undergo poverty. Actually, they were all forced to join the SSM, driven by poverty and lack of food.

Another driver for child labor is the lack of affordable education and schooling. Therefore, for many children, school is not an option and they therefore decide to go straight to the work force. Additionally, it is influenced by macroeconomic factors such as tendencies for cheap products and labor. This makes child labor attractive to mine owners as they are able to pay less money in labor expenses. However, as education has become more available, the problem is decreasing, although still very prevalent.

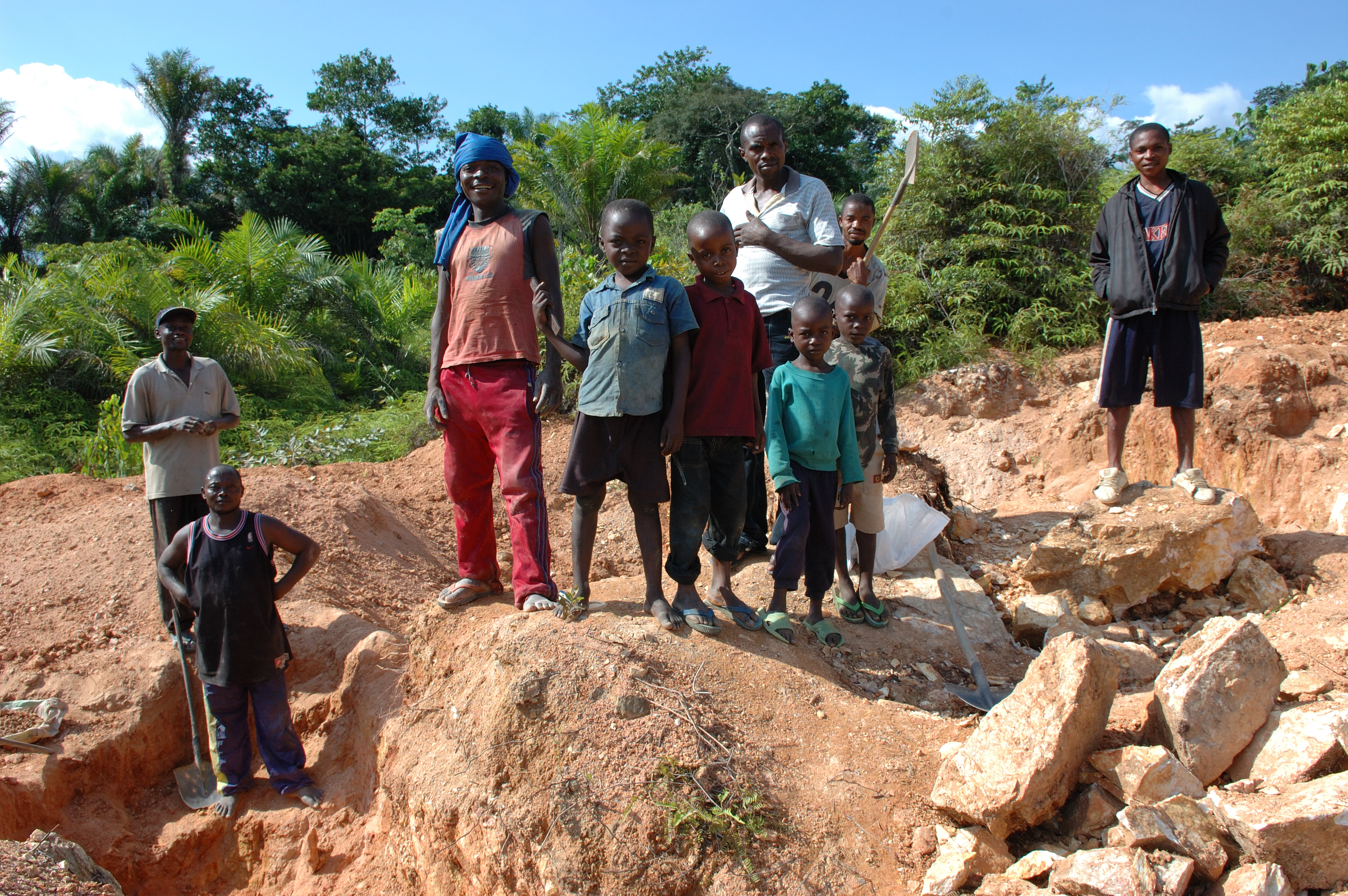
Child labor, Artisan Mining in Kailo Congo

The recent ILO’s global report confirms that there are estimated 127.3 million economically active children age from 5 to 14 in Asia. According to a survey by the National Bureau of Statistics in 1995, the mining department employed about 15626 children in mining. More than 31% of children drop out of high school, and others do poorly at school. Poverty is the common reason for why child labour exists. The purpose of child labor is to assist parents to subsidize their families. Their annual income accounts for 30 percent of total household income, approximately PhP36,614. The majority of child labour are male, but girls are also involved. Girls are more vulnerable than boys to other forms of exploitation, such as child prostitution. Children are deprived of their childhood and education by child labour and exposed to occupational hazards related to working conditions in SSM. Children work in the mine under an incredible conditions. The soil, water and the air were polluted by heavy metal, such as mercury due to environmental hazards. In most of the mines, children have to work underground in darkness and airless. There is only one rope to get in and out of the mine. Sometimes they will use flashlights for lighting.

On Friday, June 10, the annual meeting of the International Labour Organization held in Geneva, Switzerland. At the same time, a global initiative was launched by the International Labour Organization (ILO) that to eliminate child labour in SSM with the government. With regard to mining, the Asian Labour Organization has taken positive measures to combat child labour in small-scale mining, while a number of technical cooperation projects have been carried out to illustrate how to crack down child labour in the mining industries. The best way to help child laborers is to improve the survivability, environmental sustainability and safety of the SSM economy.

== Mining pollution ==
Due to the irregular operation of mining, it has caused irreversible damage to the environment. Mining produces a lot of chemicals, causing serious pollution to air, soil and water resources.

=== Air pollution ===
Underground mining is a common method of mining. In the process of mining, drilling and blasting are usually used to underground mining. Large amounts of dust and toxic gas are emitted after blasting, such as carbon monoxide, methane and sulfur dioxide. These particles are harmful to the human body if consumed or exposed to in large amounts.

Coal is the primary energy need of most countries in Northeast Asia. In terms of energy usage, coal accounts for 77% of China, 85% of South Korea and 80% of Mongolia. In Northeast Asia, coal is used for both industrial and residential activities. In general, the main problem is that the sources of air pollution are generated during the coal combustion and conversion phases. The air pollution will result in respiratory diseases.

=== Water pollution ===
In China, coal mines pollute both air and water resources. Chemicals from coal mining begin to erode the soil, then gradually seep into the groundwater. According to the research, each ton of coal mined will pollute 1 - 2.5 cubic meters of water resources. Mine water is essential for mine operation, and in the process of mining, mine water will be contaminated with different acidic chemicals which form acid mine drainage (AMD). A large number of sulfides-containing rocks are exploited during mining. These rocks react with oxygen and water in the air to produce sulfuric acid. As long as the rocks are exposed to the air, sulfuric acid seeps from them. These acidic substances will pass through rainwater into the river and soil.

==== Mining spill in Fujian, China ====
In Fujian Province, China, a leakage accident occurred in the mining waste pool of a Zijinshan Copper Mine, resulting in reservoir pollution. This damaged the local fishing industry as more than 4 million pounds of fish were lost with the spill. Xinghua news reported that Zijin Mining Company will take full responsibility for the incident. The company will compensate the fishermen for their losses. At the same time, the government issued a notice and mobilized local villagers to help salvage the toxic fish from the rivers.

==== Gold mine in Lao ====
The mining industry is the main source of income for Lao. Gold mining in Vientiane has contaminated nearby rivers with cyanide, which is one of the most common mining chemicals and used mainly to dissolve gold. Cyanide leaks usually occur during the rainy season. Overflow from sewage treatment plant caused cyanide to enter rivers through the soil.

==== Coal mining around Gujiao ====
The basin around Gujiao in China features the confluence of four major rivers, and this mining center is positioned near the peak of the mountain bordering this valley. Coal mining requires large amounts of water. Large volumes of contaminated water flow down the mountainside and mix with the river water. This affects farmers and local villages that live downstream of the mine. Mining has been operating in the Gujiao area for two centuries years, which had caused the landscape to change dramatically since these mining facilities' inception.

=== Soil pollution ===
Soil is important to humanity. People use soil to develop agriculture and rely on soil-grown crops to survive. However, due to the large number of mining companies to develop the mining industry, soil pollution has become more prevalent. Chemicals from mining minerals tend to create biochemical reactions when exposed to air. The resulting new material will slowly seep into the soil. As a result, over time, these chemicals accumulate more and more. The accumulated chemicals eventually form a variety of toxins that harm human health. Farmers grow crops on the contaminated soil. During the growth of crops, nutrients are drawn from the soil. These toxins are absorbed through the roots of the plant. When the crops are ripe, they are sold to the market and end up being eaten by people. These toxins are absorbed by human body and threaten their health.

The staple food in China is rice, and the annual production of rice is also considerable. According to the industrial and commercial bureau investigation, some rice was found to contain excessive levels of heavy metals. These heavy metals are all carcinogens to human body.

China has always been beset by soil pollution. According to the study, more than 2/3 of the cultivated land is polluted, and 82.8% of the soil samples contain nickel, lead, arsenic, copper, mercury, chromium, zinc and cadmium.

=== Mine runoff ===
In addition to chemicals, Gold, Copper, Coal, and Zinc mines in Asia require substantial amounts of water for operation. As this water is used, it creates runoff which is released from the perimeter of the mine. As this water travels down hills and mountains, it slowly erodes the geographical landscape of the area. Additionally, this runoff carries soil and loose sediment with it, usually taking it from its original place to rivers or valleys. This decreases the potential use of the land by making it difficult to build on or utilize, given that this shift in sediment will make the land too rocky or too soft.

== Soil displacement and erosion ==
Due to the abundant use of water in mining, soil displacement and ground erosion are common. Thus, it can be difficult to use the land around a mine after the mining operation has begun.

Below are results from studies conducted in Oregon and Illinois by the United States Environmental Protection Agency

=== Surface characteristics over time ===
In mined areas, the EPA has found drainage and discharge levels to be far worse. With surface and open pit mining, vegetation and foliage are typically removed to make space for equipment and to expose the ground area. This vegetation would usually absorb and store water in the ground, which helps prevent floods. Therefore, when it is removed, less water is absorbed resulting in more surface water and a higher risk of serious floods. Additionally, these unmined areas have developed over time to naturally be able to drain water. However, when this is altered by processes like mining, these drainage systems are often severely changed or removed entirely, causing the water to consolidate in one place, and cause floods.

These changes also lead to higher peak flows in rivers and streams. As these basins fill with more water and absorb less water into the ground, they tend to consolidate towards moving bodies of water. This causes more water to build up here, and therefore increase the speed and rate of flows. This can be extremely harmful to the ecosystem because some of these rivers and streams are not built for high volumes of water. It can damage the landscapes by displacing rocks and soil sediments, and by moving soil further and further downstream. In extreme cases, it can wipe out river banks up to civilization, which can destroy houses and man-made structures like bridges.

However, these residential areas are not the only affected areas: industries like farming can suffer as well. As these ground structures and drainage systems change, it can restrict water flows to particular areas. This can eliminate sources of irrigation for people and industries that rely on this water as a resource. Additionally, in opposite cases, these increased peak flows near mined basins can wipe out or flood fields of crops, which can decrease or completely cut income for particular individuals.

=== Runoff qualities ===
As rainfall collects and releases from mines, it mixes with the materials and minerals that line the surface of the facilities. Normally, this would be regular, however, due to the high concentration of elements in these exposed mines, water will react with more metals than usual. When this water eventually escapes, it will be considered toxic and will eventually combine with regular water that people and animals utilize.

Runoff levels spike sharply in late spring and early summer, as this is when rainfall levels typically increase. Additionally, this is when snow begins to melt, surface water levels increase and cause more water to be displaced. Therefore, the information stated in the previous section can be exacerbated during summer periods. According to a study conducted in Illinois by the EPA, these summer or warm weather flows represent most areas' highest peak discharge levels. In conclusion, these soil displacement and potential contamination factors are typically most active during summer and warm weather conditions.

As seen in the case study with Gujiao, when this water is released or gradually runs out, it can destroy an area's ecosystem. In this case, the hydrology reports contain that this rainwater mixed with toxic chemicals, indicating that the area is not suitable for animals to survive in the area.

In areas occupied by industries such as farmland, water flow and toxicity levels are normally observed as relatively normal. This is because although the land is altered like with mining, they are replacing this ground foliage with crops, which absorb ample amounts of runoff or excess water. Even though preservatives on crops can increase toxicity levels, the elevation levels are typically flatter which contains the water. Additionally, the crops and fertile soil will consume a majority of these toxic chemicals. With this being said, farming still can be harmful to the environment through these pesticides, however, it is lower on average than the effects exhibited by mining.

== Sustainability ==
Mineral sector and sustainable development need to be considered from four aspects: society, economy, environment and management, which as a new framework. The mineral industry is an important economic activity in contemporary society. Governance systems need to be constantly developed and improved if the government departments want to promote sustainable development to demonstrate the continuous improvement of their economic, social and environmental contributions.

Minerals are a diversified sector with more than 80 different products, although the mineral sector is relatively small in the global economy. Some metals were discovered and used thousands of years ago, while others have only recently been used. With the improvement of automatic mechanization, the employment rate of mining industry is declining rapidly. According to the Labor Bureau, 30 million people are engaged in large-scale mining and 13 million people are involved in small-scale mining activities (SSM), accounting for 1 percent of the world's labour force. Partly estimated, the number of people who dependent on mining industry as their main source of income is approximately 300 million.

As an important economic activity in the world, mineral production accounts for at least 25% of commodity exports in 34 countries. Moreover, mineral production activities are gradually concentrated in developing countries. In the past few centuries, the prices of some mineral commodities have fluctuated with the continuous improvement of mining technology and the different demand for mineral resources in the market. Minerals are widely used in all fields of society, and society is also highly dependent on the value of minerals. The use and production of minerals is essential for livelihood and economic development through employment and income generation. With the increasing population and per capita income, the demand for mineral products is also increasing. Therefore, developing countries choose to expand mineral consumption to meet the basic needs of the population. Ecologically, most mineral resources are non-renewable resources. Even if the continued use of minerals for centuries has not led to the scarcity of minerals, there is no guarantee that they will last into the future.
