= Pakpak Bharat Regency =

Regency in North Sumatra, Indonesia

Coordinates: 2.5667°N 98.2833°E

Pakpak Bharat Regency Kabupaten Pakpak Bharat
- Regency
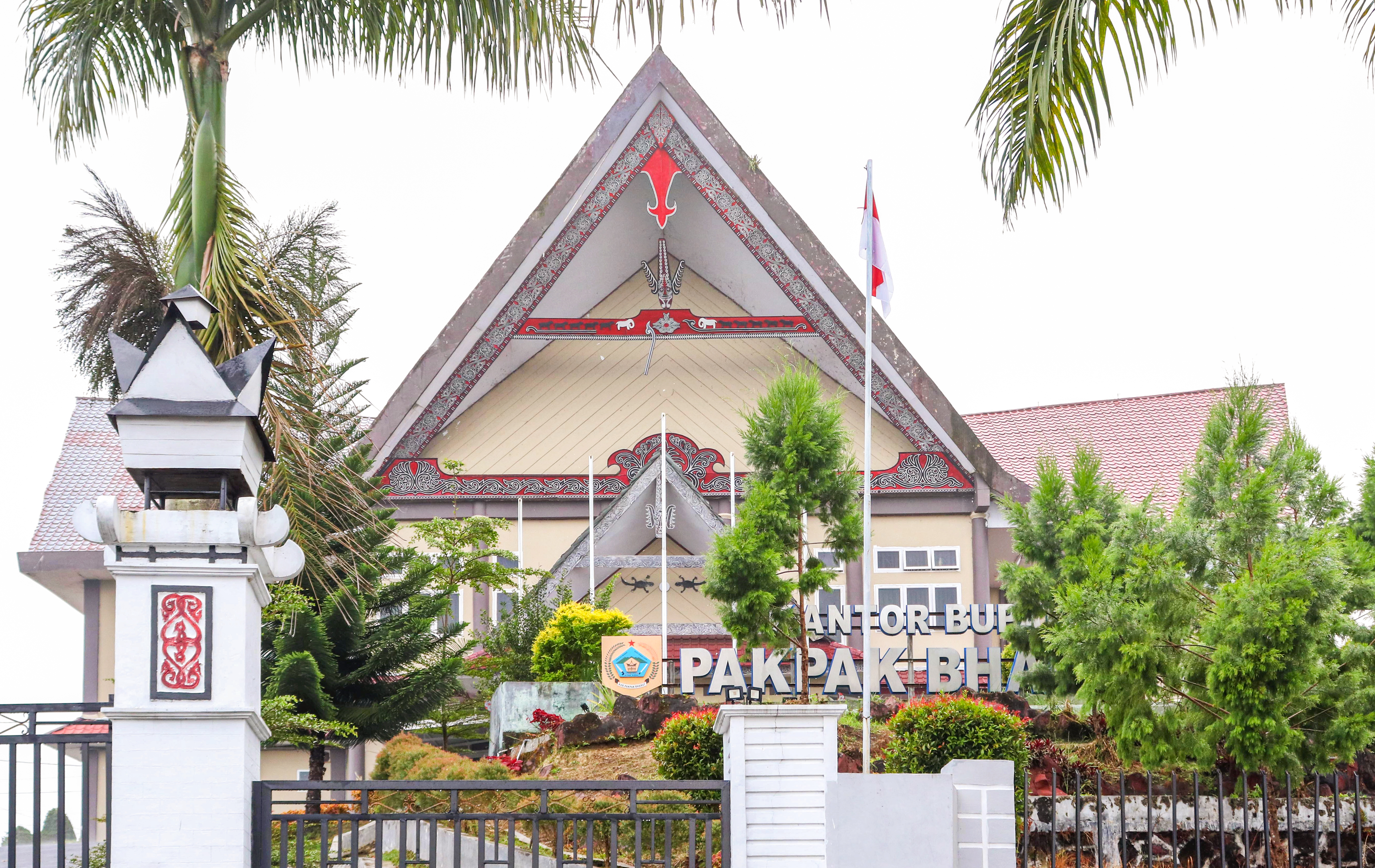
- Regent's office of Pakpak Bharat

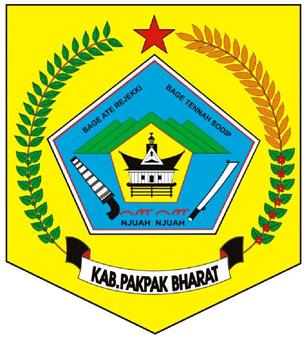
- Coat of arms
- Mottoes: Bage Ate Rejekki Bage Tennah Sodip ("Of the heart, a provision. Of the prayer, a message."); Njuah njuah ("Greeting!")
- Country: Indonesia
- Province: North Sumatra
- Regency seat: Salak

Government
  - Regent: Franc Bernhard Tumanggor
  - Vice Regent: Mutsyuhito Solin
  - Chairman of Regency's Council of Representatives: Sonni P Berutu (Partai Demokrat)
  - Vice Chairmen of Regency's Council of Representatives: Elson Angkat (Golkar) and Mansehat Manik (Gerindra)

Area
  - Total: 1,365.61 km^{2} (527.26 sq mi)

Population (mid 2025 estimate)
  - Total: 57,246
  - Density: 41.920/km^{2} (108.57/sq mi)

Demographics
  - Religion: Christianism 57,54% –Protestantism 53,45% –Catholicism 4,09% Islam 42,46%
- Time zone: UTC+7 (WIB)
- Website: www.pakpakbharatkab.go.id

Pakpak Bharat Regency is a landlocked regency in North Sumatra Province of Indonesia. It was created on 25 February 2003 from the southern districts of Dairi Regency. The regency covers an area of 1,365.61 square kilometres and it had a population of 40,481 at the 2010 census and 52,351 at the 2020 Census; the official estimate as of mid 2025 was 57,246 (comprising 28,949 males and 28,297 females). Its seat is the town of Salak. It is the least populated regency in North Sumatra; its population is roughly the same as Greenland, the island with the lowest population density in the world.

== Administrative districts ==
The regency is divided administratively into eight districts (kecamatan), tabulated below with their reas and their populations at the 2010 Census and the 2020 Census, together with the official estimates as of mid 2025. The table also includes the locations of the district administrative centres, the number of administrative villages (all classed as rural desa) in each district and its post code.

Kode Wilayah	Name of District (kecamatan)	Area in km^{2}	Pop'n Census 2010	Pop'n Census 2020	Pop'n Estimate mid 2025	Admin centre	No. of villages	Post code
12.15.03	Salak	238.16	7,216	10,057	11,411	Salak	6	22272
12.15.01	Sitellu Tali Ureng Jehe	380.62	9,365	11,486	12,251	Sibande	10	22275
12.15.06	Pagindar	296.76	1,211	1,476	1,570	Pagindar	4	22270
12.15.04	Sitellu Tali Ureng Julu	63.82	3,376	4,321	4,705	Ulu Merah	5	22276
12.15.05	Pergetteng-Getteng; Sengkut	75.37	3,740	4,751	5,154	Kecupak	5	22273
12.15.02	Kerajaan	139.82	8,115	10,078	10,814	Sukarame	10	22271
12.15.07	Tinada	53.96	3,639	4,827	5,348	Tinada	6	22277
12.15.08	Siempat Rube	117.10	3,843	5,355	5,993	Jambu Rea	6	22274
	Totals	1,365.61	40,505	52,351	57,246	Salak	52	

== Demographics ==
=== Ethnic groups ===
The indigenous peoples that inhabit Pakpak Bharat Regency in general are the Pakpak people. Besides Pakpak, other Batak ethnicities include Toba and Karo; there are also other ethnic groups such as Malay and Nias and so on.

Most of the territory of Pakpak Bharat Regency is the ulayat land of the Pakpak people Suak Simsim, so the majority of Pakpak clan in Pakpak Bharat Regency are from Suak Simsim. However, there are also other Pakpak clans from the other four phylums.

The Pakpak clans inhabiting Pakpak Bharat Regency include:

- Bancin
- Banurea
- Berutu
- Boangmanalu
- Cibro
- Kabeakan
- Kesogihen
- Limbong
- Manik
- Padang
- Padang Batanghari
- Sinamo
- Sitakar
- Solin
- Tinendung

=== Religion ===
Religious composition in Pakpak Bharat Regency.
1. Protestantism (53.5%)
2. Islam (42.5%)
3. Catholicism (4.09%)

The number of houses of worship by type of places of worship in 2016 in Pakpak Bharat Regency is as follows:

- Church Protestant 98 buildings
- Church Catholic 13 buildings
- Mosque as many as 78 buildings

In Pakpak Bharat Regency, Christianity is the religion with the majority of the population, followed by adherents of the Islam religion which also has a large population. There are a total of 189 places of worship (111 churches (98 Protestant and 13 Catholic)), and 78 mosques.

residents of Pakpak Bharat Regency who are Protestant Christians are members of the Church GKPPD.
