= Gosowong mine =

Gold mine in North Maluku, Indonesia

- Interactive map of Gosowong mine
- Location: North Maluku, Indonesia; 1.101893°N 127.7029945°E
- Products: Gold, silver

The Gosowong mine is one of the largest gold mines in Indonesia and in the world. The mine is located in the east of the country in North Maluku. The mine has estimated reserves of 6 million oz of gold.
