= Tayan mine =

Bauxite mine in Indonesia

- Location: Sulawesi, Indonesia
- Products: Bauxite

The Tayan mine is a large mine located in the eastern part of Indonesia in West Kalimantan. Tayan represents one of the largest bauxite reserve in Indonesia and one of the largest in Asia, having estimated reserves of 115.8 million tonnes.
