= Sangatta Coal Mine =

Coal mine in Indonesia

Coordinates: 0.5966°N 117.4940°E

- Interactive map of Sangatta Coal Mine
- Location: East Kalimantan, Indonesia
- Products: Coking coal

The Sangatta Coal Mine is a coal mine located in East Kalimantan. The mine has coal reserves amounting to 3.6 billion tonnes of coking coal, one of the largest coal reserves in Asia and the world. The mine has an annual production capacity of 35.7 million tonnes of coal.

== See also ==
- Bengalon coal mine - part of the same mine complex (KPC Operation)
