= Konawe Utara mine =

Nickel mine in Sulawesi, Indonesia

- Location: Sulawesi, Indonesia
- Products: Nickel

The Konawe Utara mine is a large mine in the east of Indonesia in Sulawesi. Konawe Utara represents one of the largest nickel reserve in Indonesia having estimated reserves of 100 million tonnes of ore grading 2.86% nickel. The 100 million tonnes of ore contains 2.86 million tonnes of nickel metal.
