= Halmahera mine =

Mine in North Maluku, Indonesia

- Location: North Maluku, Indonesia
- Products: Nickel
- Company: Eramet

The Halmahera mine is a large mine in the east of Indonesia in the North Maluku. Halmahera represents one of the largest nickel reserve in Indonesia having estimated reserves of 466 million tonnes of ore grading 1.5% nickel. The 466 million tonnes of ore contains 7 million tonnes of nickel metal.
