= Dairi mine =

Zinc mine in Indonesia

- Location in Sumatra
- Location: Near the Sopokomil hamlet of Longkotan village, Silima Pungga-Pungga subdivision, Dairi Regency, North Sumatra; 2°49′N 98°07′E
- Products: Lead, Zinc
- Discovered: 1997
- Company: Dairi Prima Mineral
- Website: www.ptdpm.co.id

The Dairi mine is a zinc and lead mine in the Dairi Regency of the North Sumatra province of Indonesia.

It is owned by Dairi Prima Mineral, which obtained a permit to explore the area in 1988 and started drilling in 1997. The largest of the ore bodies is 26.7 million tons, reportedly estimated by the mining company as comprising 7% lead and 12% zinc.

== Location and description ==
The underground mine is located near the Sopokomil hamlet of Longkotan [id] village in the Silima Pungga-Pungga [id] subdistrict of Dairi Regency, in the North Sumatra province on the island of Sumatra, in Western Indonesia. The location is 25 kilometres west-northwest of Sidikalang, the capital town of Dairi Regency.

The mine sits on the Great Sumatran fault line. The earthquake-prone land around the mine is unstable because it is composed of ash from the local volcanoes. Stanford University civil engineer Richard Meehan said that the mine's design is "almost certain" to result in a disaster due to the instability of the tailings dam. The owners of the mine partly rejected Meehan's assertions.

== Ownership ==
The mine is owned by Dairi Prima Mineral, officially known as PT Dairi Prima Minera). Key staff include technical director Ryno Chandra Mulya.

It was previously owned by West Perth company Herald Resources Inc.

== History ==
In 1998, Dairi Prima Mineral was given a mining permit covering 24,000 hectares (59,000 acres). Drilling began in 1997, during which an ore body with high concentrations of Zinc. The ore body was named Anjing Hitam (English: Black dog) after Blacky the drilling team's pet dog. Exploration of the site continued for six years. A 2002 and 2004 studies estimated the ore body to be 7.7 million tonnes in weight, containing 16% zinc sulfide and 9.8% galena, the naturally occurring form of lead sulfide. 2012 updated from the owners indicate reserves of 26.6 million tonnes of ore graded at 7% lead and 12% zinc.

Since then, local villagers have raised concerns about the storage of explosives, the location of a tailings dam, the killing of fish and flash flooding, that occurred in 2018 allegedly as a result of mining activity. The company blamed the flooding on illegal forestry in the region. In 2019, the local community officially registered their complaint with the Compliance Advisor/Ombudsman of the International Finance Corporation, a division of the World Bank, who partly financed the mine. The 2022 report of the ombudsman “suggests shortcomings in the design of DPM’s tailings dam and assessment of associated risks compared with good international industry practice for the construction of such facilities, particularly considering the topographical, geological, seismic and climatological characteristics of the site.”

Advocacy group Bakumsu stated that it “is clear they [the government] are willing to sacrifice these communities’ safety to big business.”

After a series of Addenda to their Environmental Impact Assessment, in 2022, DPM were provided Environmental Approval for changes to their mine by the Indonesian Ministry of Environment and Forestry. This decision was challenged by legal groups acting for concerned citizens from around the proposed mine. In July 2023, the Jakarta Administrative Court released a verdict upholding the community complaint in its entirety, obliging the Ministry of Environment and Forestry to revoke DPM's Environmental Approval. (https://sipp.ptun-jakarta.go.id/index.php/detil_perkara. Enter the case number 59/G/LH/2023/PTUN.JKT.)
