= Buli mine =

Nickel mine in Indonesia

- Location: Halmahera, Indonesia
- Products: Nickel

The Buli mine is a large mine in the east of Indonesia in Halmahera. Buli represents one of the largest nickel reserve in Indonesia having estimated reserves of 161.2 million tonnes of ore grading 1.37% nickel. The 161.2 million tonnes of ore contains 2.2 million tonnes of nickel metal.
