= GAM coal mine =

GAM Coal Mine
- Location: East Kalimantan, Indonesia
- Products: Coking coal

The GAM Coal Mine is a coal mine located in the East Kalimantan. The mine has coal reserves amounting to 500 million tonnes of coking coal, one of the largest coal reserves in Asia and the world. The mine has an annual production capacity of 12 million tonnes of coal.
