= North Konawe mine =

Nickel mine in Indonesia

- Location: Sulawesi, Indonesia
- Products: Nickel

The North Konawe mine is a large mine in the east of Indonesia in Sulawesi. North Konawe represents one of the largest nickel reserve in Indonesia having estimated reserves of 498 million tonnes of ore grading 1.36% nickel. The 498 million tonnes of ore contains 6.77 million tonnes of nickel metal.

There are conflicting opinions on this mining business of state-owned mining company PT Aneka Tambang (Antam). While the Indonesian government, in 2022, considered it a National Vital Object (Obvitnas), there has been significant resistance by the population against the mining permits from 2007 on.
