= Kencana mine =

Mine in Indonesia

- Location: North Maluku, Indonesia
- Products: Gold, silver

The Kencana mine is one of the largest gold mines in Indonesia and in the world. The mine is located in the east of the country in North Maluku. The mine has estimated reserves of 4.63 million oz of gold and 6 million oz of silver.

Underground development of the Kencana mine commenced in February 2005 and the first underground ore was mined in March 2006.
