= Beutong mine =

Copper mine in Sumatra, Indonesia

- Location: Sumatra, Indonesia
- Products: Copper

The Beutong mine is a large copper mine located in Nagan Raya Regency, Sumatra, Indonesia. Beutong represents one of the largest copper reserve in Indonesia and in the world having estimated reserves of 505 million tonnes of ore grading 0.59% copper, 2.1 million oz of gold and 20 million oz of silver.
