= Pasir coal mine =

Mine in Indonesia

Pasir Coal Mine
- Location: East Kalimantan, Indonesia
- Products: Coking coal
- Company: Kideco

The Pasir Coal Mine is a coal mine located in East Kalimantan. The mine has coal reserves amounting to 1.38 billion tonnes of coking coal, one of the largest coal reserves in Asia and the world. The mine has an annual production capacity of 32 million tonnes of coal.
