= Bengalon coal mine =

Bengalon Coal Mine
- Location: East Kalimantan, Indonesia
- Products: Coking coal

The Bengalon coal mine is located in East Kalimantan. The mine has coal reserves amounting to 871 million tonnes of coking coal, one of the largest coal reserves in Asia and the world. The mine has an annual production capacity of 4.3 million tonnes of coal.

In 2004, Henry Walker Eltin was appointed the mining services contract.

== See also ==
- Sangatta Coal Mine - part of the same mine complex (KPC Operation)
