= Indonesian Army Corps of Engineers =

- Pusat Zeni Angkatan Darat
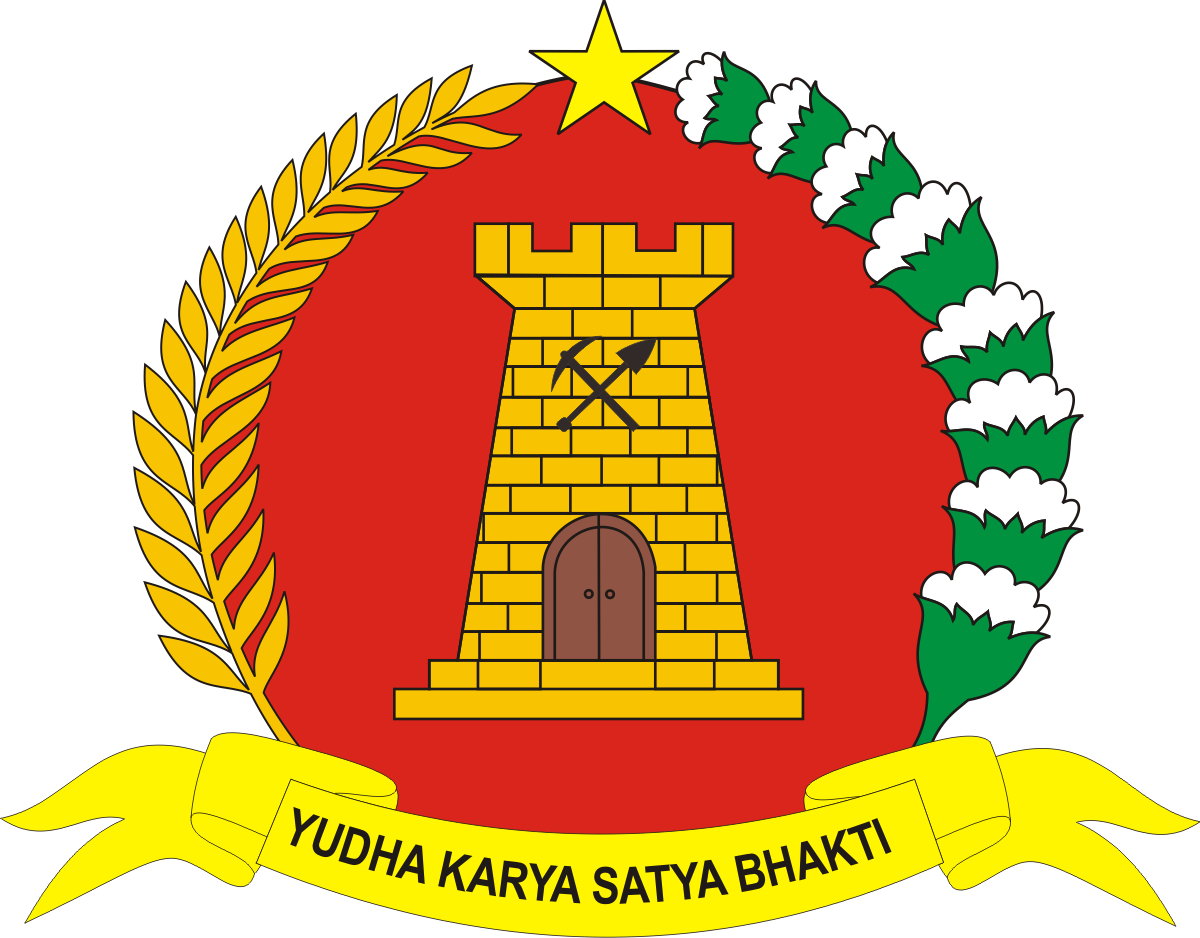
- Insignia of Indonesian Army Corps of Engineers
- Active: 15 October 1945
- Country: Indonesia
- Branch: Indonesian Army Central Executive Agencies
- Type: Military engineering corps
- Garrison/HQ: Matraman, Jakarta
- Mottos: Yudha Karya Satya Bhakti ("fight by works, with loyalty and devotion")
- Colors: Red, gold, green and brown
- Engagements: Indonesian National Revolution; Republic of South Maluku rebellion 1950; Permesta/PRRI rebellion of 1957-58; Darul Islam rebellion Operation Trikora; Indonesia-Malaysia confrontation Indonesian invasion of East Timor; United Nations peacekeeping operations
- Website: pusziad.tni-ad.mil.id/

Commanders
- Chairman: Maj.Gen. I Nengah Wiraatmaja
- Deputy Chairman: Brig.Gen. Maryono

The Indonesian Army Corps of Engineers (Indonesian: Pusat Zeni Angkatan Darat, lit. 'Indonesian Army Engineering Center'), abbreviated Pusziad, or simply Zeni is an Indonesian Army Central Executive Agency made up of some 15,000 civilian and military personnel, making it one of Southeast Asia's and the ASEAN's, largest public engineering, design, and construction management agencies. The Corps is involved in a wide range of disaster relief and public works projects within the republic, as well as in combat support operations. The Indonesian term for military engineers, Zeni, is derived from the Dutch genie, meaning sapper.

Their most visible missions include:

- Public works construction (especially in villages, under the wider Tentara Manunggal Membangun Desa /TMMD program (previously known as ABRI Masuk Desa/ AMD program), flood control, beach nourishment, and dredging for waterway navigation.
- Design and construction of flood protection systems through various national mandates.
- Design and construction management of military facilities for the Army, Air Force, and other Defence and national agencies.
- Environmental regulation and ecosystem restoration in coordination with the national government and the private sector.
- Providing the Army with an active EOD detection and nuclear, biological and chemical defence capability.

== Brief history of the Pusziad ==
Founded on October 15, 1945, the Indonesian Army Corps of Engineers was raised as one of the oldest major support commands of the Army in the onset of the military operations of the Indonesian National Revolution, its baptism of fire. Army Engineers were present in all major battles of the National Revolution until 1949, when the Royal Netherlands East Indies Army ceased to exist and the independence of the republic was recognized. Army combat engineers were part of the military operations during the Liberal democracy period in Indonesia, in Operation Trikora, the Indonesia-Malaysia confrontation, the Indonesian invasion of East Timor and rebel counter-insurgency operations from the 1980s until today.

First Lieutenant Pierre Tendean (later promoted posthumously to captain), who perished in the events of the 30 September Movement of 1965, was one of the more famous Army combat engineers, having joined the Corps while serving as a cadet in the Military Technical Academy and was officially commissioned a second lieutenant upon graduation. Before being made adjutant to General Abdul Haris Nasution, his first assignment was as a platoon commander with the Corps of Engineers in Kodam I/Bukit Barisan. Other well known Army Engineers include former Vice President Try Sutrisno and retired Generals GPH Djatikoesoemo and Budiman, both of whom, alongside Try, served as Chief of Staff of the Army.

Army Engineers have also been active as part of the Garuda Contingent overseas and in public works and civil disaster relief operations through the years.

== Trades ==
All military personnel of the Pusziad are trained combat engineers and all privates and non-commissioned officers also have another trade. These trades include: air conditioning fitter, electrician, general fitter, plant operator mechanic, plumber, bricklayer, plasterer / painter, carpenter & joiner, fabricator, building materials technician, design draughtsman, electrical & mechanical draughtsman, geographic support technician, survey engineer, armoured engineer, driver, engineer IT, engineer logistics specialist, amphibious engineer, bomb disposal specialist, diver or search specialist. Civil personnel of the Corps come from engineering graduates and civil service workers.

== Organizational structure ==
=== Headquarters and Training School ===
The Director General and Chief of Engineers, who is an Army officer holding the rank of major general, and the Deputy Director General Corps of Engineers, who is an army brigadier general, are both appointed by and report directly to the Chief of Staff of the Indonesian Army. The Corps of Engineers headquarters is located in East Jakarta. The headquarters staff is responsible for Corps of Engineers policy and plans the future direction of all other Pusziad organizations.

The Corps of Engineers Training School (Pusat Pendidikan Zeni (Pusdikzi)) was established in Bandung in 1946 to train future Army engineers regardless of rank. Today, the Pusdikzi is based in Bogor and has an active training program for personnel serving in the Corps.

=== Construction Engineers Regiment "Cakti Ring Karya" ===
Indonesian Army Engineer units outside of Corps Divisions and not listed below fall under the Construction Engineers Regiment of the Indonesian Army Corps of Engineers. Army engineers include both combat engineers and support engineers more focused on construction and sustainment. The vast majority of military personnel in the Indonesian Army Corps of Engineers serve in this Engineer Regiment. The Construction Engineers Regiment, led by the Engineer Commandant, who is an Army officer of Colonel rank, is headquartered at Pasar Rebo in East Jakarta and is organized into:

- Regiment HQ
  - 12th Construction Engineers Battalion/Karana Jaya
  - 13th Construction Engineers Battalion/Karya Etmaka
  - 14th Construction Engineers Battalion/Serada Wirya Camertitaya

=== Organization of the Corps ===
Together with the Construction Engineers Regiment under its direct control, the Indonesian Army Corps of Engineers is organized geographically into 27 permanent divisions, a special administrative regiment for the Kostrad with two battalions, two specialized companies reporting directly to the HQ and a special battalion which is under the operational control of the Paspampres. Within each division, there are several Engineer detachments and battalions of combat and construction engineers and engineering departments and bureaux in each area and district. Each of the 16 divisions correspond to the 21 military regions of the Army proper and employ more than 3,500 people per division. Divisions are defined by political boundaries for military and civil projects and their commanders report both to the Director General and the commanders of their respective military regions.

==== Territorial divisions ====
- Military Regional Command IM Engineering Division - Headquartered in Banda Aceh, Aceh.
  - 16th Combat Engineer Battalion
  - 1st Divisional Construction Engineer Detachment
  - 2nd Divisional Construction Engineer Detachment
- 1st Military Regional Command Engineering Division - Headquartered in Medan, North Sumatera.
  - 1st Combat Engineer Battalion
  - 2nd Combat Engineer Detachment
  - 1st Divisional Construction Engineer Detachment
  - 2nd Divisional Construction Engineer Detachment
  - 3rd Divisional Construction Engineer Detachment
  - 4th Divisional Construction Engineer Detachment
- 2nd Military Regional Command Engineering Division - Headquartered in Palembang, South Sumatera.
  - 2nd Combat Engineer Battalion
  - 14th Combat Engineer Detachment
  - 1st Divisional Construction Engineer Detachment
  - 2nd Divisional Construction Engineer Detachment
  - 3rd Divisional Construction Engineer Detachment
  - 4th Divisional Construction Engineer Detachment
- Military Regional Command Jaya Engineering Division - Headquartered in Cawang, East Jakarta.
  - 11th Combat Engineer Battalion
  - 3rd Combat Engineer Detachment
  - 1st Capital Construction Engineer Detachment
  - 2nd Capital Construction Engineer Detachment
  - 3rd Capital Construction Engineer Detachment
- 3rd Military Regional Command Engineering Division - Headquartered in Bandung, West Java.
  - 3rd Combat Engineer Battalion
  - 1st Divisional Construction Engineer Detachment
  - 2nd Divisional Construction Engineer Detachment
  - 3rd Divisional Construction Engineer Detachment
- 4th Military Regional Command Engineering Division - Headquartered in Semarang, Central Java.
  - 4th Combat Engineer Battalion
  - 1st Divisional Construction Engineer Detachment
  - 2nd Divisional Construction Engineer Detachment
  - 3rd Divisional Construction Engineer Detachment
  - 4th Divisional Construction Engineer Detachment
- 5th Military Regional Command Engineering Division - Headquartered in Surabaya, East Java.
  - 5th Combat Engineer Battalion
  - 1st Divisional Construction Engineer Detachment
  - 2nd Divisional Construction Engineer Detachment
  - 3rd Divisional Construction Engineer Detachment
  - 4th Divisional Construction Engineer Detachment
- 6th Military Regional Command Engineering Division - Headquartered in Balikpapan, East Kalimantan.
  - 17th Combat Engineer Battalion
  - 8th Combat Engineer Detachment
  - 1st Divisional Construction Engineer Detachment
  - 2nd Divisional Construction Engineer Detachment
- 9th Military Regional Command Engineering Division - Headquartered in Denpasar, Bali.
  - 18th Combat Engineer Battalion
  - 1st Divisional Construction Engineer Detachment
  - 2nd Divisional Construction Engineer Detachment
  - 3rd Divisional Construction Engineer Detachment
- 12nd Military Regional Command Engineering Division - Headquartered in Pontianak, West Kalimantan.
  - 6th Combat Engineer Battalion
  - 1st Divisional Construction Engineer Detachment
  - 2nd Divisional Construction Engineer Detachment
- 13rd Military Regional Command Engineering Division - Headquartered in Manado, North Sulawesi.
  - 19th Combat Engineer Battalion
  - 15th Combat Engineer Detachment
  - 1st Divisional Construction Engineer Detachment
  - 2nd Divisional Construction Engineer Detachment
  - 3rd Divisional Construction Engineer Detachment
- 14th Military Regional Command Engineering Division - Headquartered in Makassar, South Sulawesi.
  - 8th Combat Engineer Battalion
  - 1st Divisional Construction Engineer Detachment
  - 2nd Divisional Construction Engineer Detachment
  - 3rd Divisional Construction Engineer Detachment
- 15th Military Regional Command Engineering Division - Headquartered in Ambon, Maluku.
  - 5th Combat Engineer Detachment
  - 1st Divisional Construction Engineer Detachment
  - 2nd Divisional Construction Engineer Detachment
- 17th Military Regional Command Engineering Division - Headquartered in Jayapura, Papua.
  - 10th Combat Engineer Detachment
  - 11th Combat Engineer Detachment
  - 12th Combat Engineer Detachment
  - 1st Divisional Construction Engineer Detachment
  - 2nd Divisional Construction Engineer Detachment
- 18th Military Regional Command Engineering Division - Headquartered in Sorong, West Papua.
  - 20th Combat Engineer Battalion
  - 1st Divisional Construction Engineer Detachment
  - 2nd Divisional Construction Engineer Detachment

==== Specialized units ====
Note: due to the formation of the 3rd Kostrad Infantry Division in 2018, a Combat Engineer battalion is planned for potential activation in the future within the division.

- Kostrad Engineers Section
  - 9th Combat Engineer Battalion, 1st Kostrad Infantry Division
  - 10th Combat Engineer Battalion, 2nd Kostrad Infantry Division
- Paspampres EOD and Bomb Detection and Disposal Detachment
- Army Explosive Ordance Disposal (EOD) Company
- Army CBRN Defense Company

== See also ==
- Military engineering
- Combat engineer
- Indonesian Army
