= Indonesian Army infantry brigades =

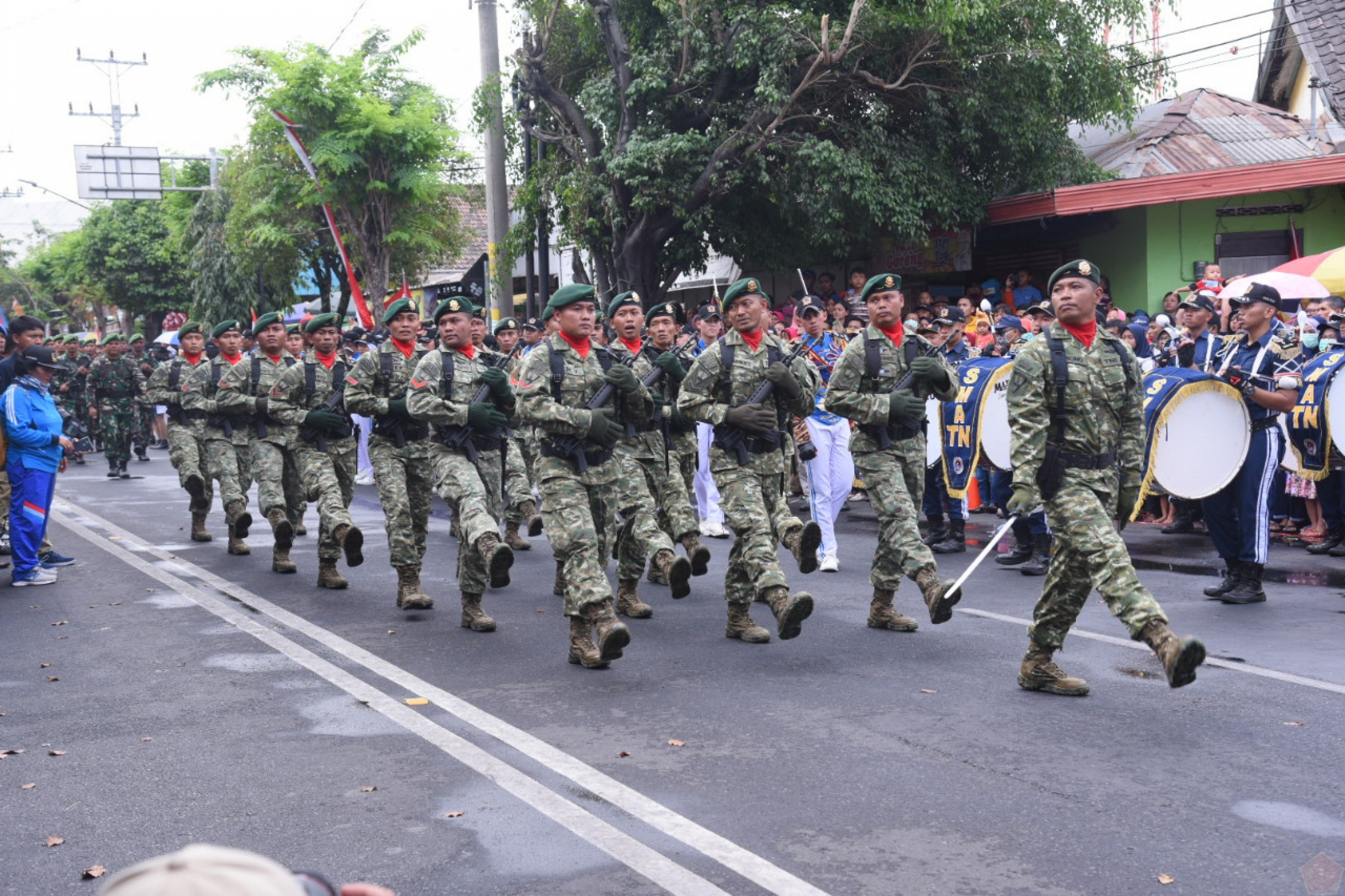
Members of the Kostrad 6th Raider Mechanized Infantry Brigade on a parade in Sukoharjo City, 2019

The Indonesian Army and Marine Corps have several infantry brigades (Indonesian: Brigade Infanteri, shortened as Brigif). Korpasgat have Paracommando Qualified Infantry Brigade. These brigades normally consisted of about three infantry battalions. Currently the Army has 22 brigades, the Marine Corps has 4 brigades, and the Quick Reaction Force Corps has 3 brigades.

== Infantry Brigades in Indonesia ==
There are two types of infantry brigades in Indonesia: ordinary brigades and "Raider"-qualified brigades. Raider-qualified brigades consisted of Raider Battalions which are under the management of the Kodams and Kostrad.

=== Infantry Brigades ===
No	SSI	Name	Commands' office	Part of
1.		4th Infantry Brigade/Dewa Ratna	Slawi, Tegal, Central Java	IV Military Regional Command/Diponegoro
2.		7th Infantry Brigade/Rimba Raya	Deli Serdang, North Sumatra	I Military Regional Command/Bukit Barisan
3.		8th Infantry Brigade/Garuda Cakti	Rejang Lebong, Bengkulu	II Military Regional Command/Sriwijaya
4.		11th Infantry Brigade/Badik Sakti	Parepare, South Sulawesi	XIV Military Regional Command/Hasanuddin
5.		15th Infantry Brigade/Kujang	Cimahi, West Java	III Military Regional Command/Siliwangi
6.		19th Infantry Brigade/Khatulistiwa	Singkawang, West Kalimantan	XII Military Regional Command/Tanjungpura
7.		21st Infantry Brigade/Komodo	Kupang, East Nusa Tenggara	IX Military Regional Command/Udayana
8.		22nd Infantry Brigade/Ota Manasa	North Gorontalo, Gorontalo	XIII Military Regional Command/Merdeka
9.		24th Infantry Brigade/Bulungan Cakti	Tanjung Selor, North Kalimantan	VI Military Regional Command/Mulawarman
10.		26th Infantry Brigade/Gurana Piarawaimo	Teluk Bintuni, West Papua	XVIII Military Regional Command/Kasuari
11.		27th Infantry Brigade/Nusa Ina	Amahai, Maluku	XV Military Regional Command/Pattimura

=== Raider Infantry Brigades ===
Raider infantry brigades are responsible for the Raider Infantry Battalions.

No	SSI	Name	Commands' office	Part of
1.		9th Raider Infantry Brigade/Daraka Yudha	Jember, East Java	2nd Kostrad Infantry Division
2.		13th Raider Infantry Brigade/Galuh	Tasikmalaya, West Java	1st Kostrad Infantry Division
3.		20th Raider Infantry Brigade/Ima Jaya Keramo	Timika, Central Papua	3rd Kostrad Infantry Division
4.		25th Special Raider Infantry Brigade/Siwah	Lhoksukon, North Aceh, Aceh	Iskandar Muda Military Regional Command

=== Para Raider Infantry Brigades ===
Para Raider infantry brigades head Para Raider Battalions. These were formerly Lintas Udara (Linud) / Airborne brigades.

No	SSI	Name	Commands' office	Part of
1.		3rd Para Raider Infantry Brigade/Tri Budi Sakti	Tanralili, Maros, South Sulawesi	Kostrad 3rd Infantry Division
2.		17th Para Raider Infantry Brigade/Kujang I	Cijantung, East Jakarta, Jakarta	Kostrad 1st Infantry Division
3.		18th Para Raider Infantry Brigade/Trisula	Jabung, Malang, East Java	Kostrad 2nd Infantry Division

=== Raider Mechanized Infantry Brigade ===
Raider Mechanized brigades are under the command of Kostrad.

No	SSI	Name	Commands' office	Part of
1.		6th Raider Mechanized Infantry Brigade/Tri Sakti Balajaya	Mojolaban, Sukoharjo, Sukoharjo, Central Java	Kostrad 2nd Infantry Division
2.		14th Raider Mechanized Infantry Brigade/Mandala Yudha	Lebak, Banten	Kostrad 1st Infantry Division

=== Mechanized Infantry Brigade ===
These brigades are under the command of Kodam.

No	SSI	Name	Commands' office	Part of
1.		1st Mechanized Infantry Brigade/Jaya Sakti	East Jakarta, Jakarta	Jayakarta Jaya Military Regional Command
2.		16th Mechanized Infantry Brigade/Wira Yudha	Kediri, East Java	V Military Regional Command/Brawijaya

=== Marine Infantry Brigade ===
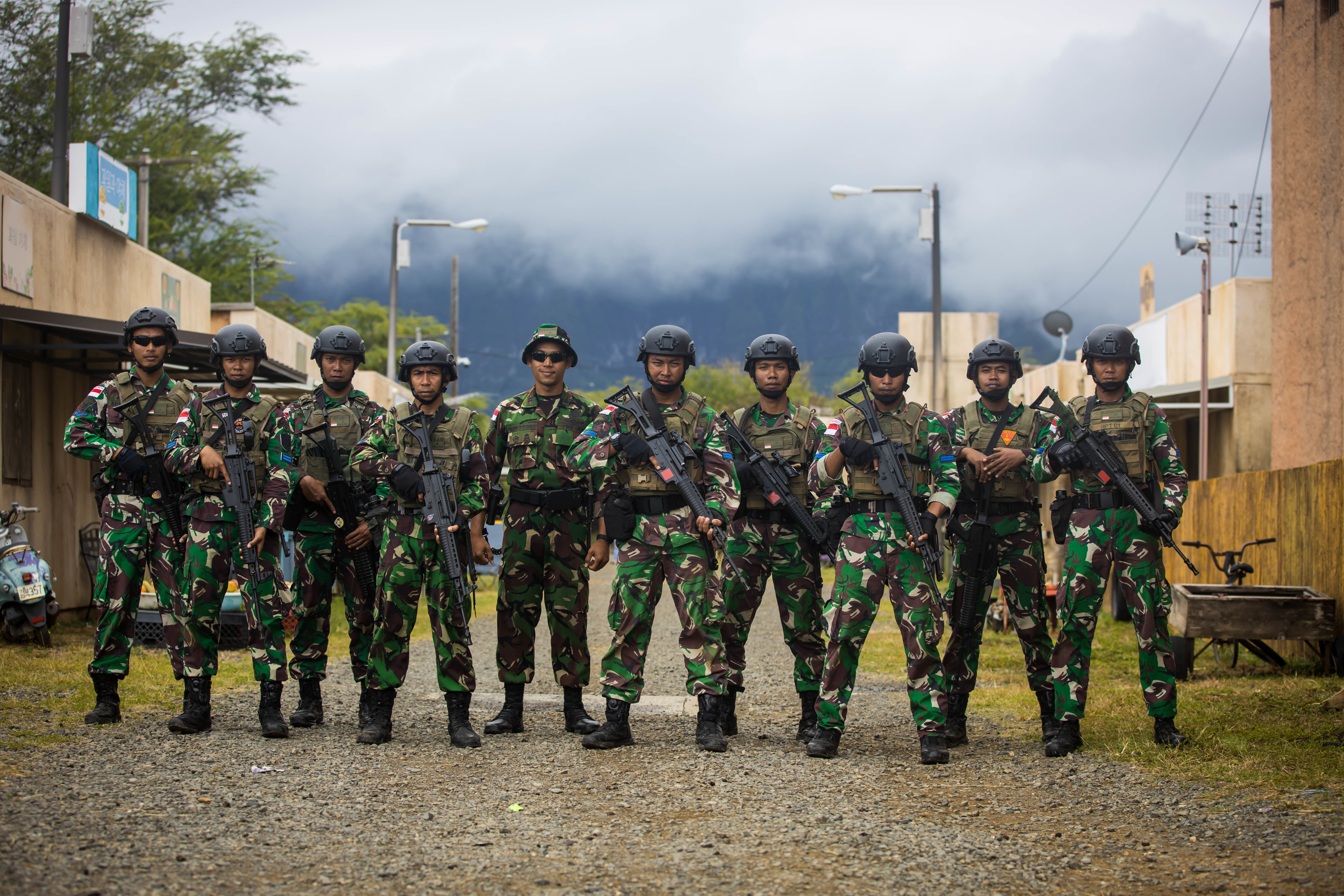
Indonesian Korps Marinir RI during RIMPAC 2022

While not part of the Army, the Indonesian Navy's Korps Marinir also have Brigade sized units.

No	SSI	Name	Commands' office	Part of
1.		1st Marine Infantry Brigade	Cilandak, South Jakarta, Jakarta	1st Marine Force
2.		2nd Marine Infantry Brigade	Gedangan, Sidoarjo, East Java	2nd Marine Force
3.		3rd Marine Infantry Brigade	Salawati, Sorong, West Papua	3rd Marine Force
4.		4th Marine Infantry Brigade	Padang Cermin, Pesawaran, Lampung	Independent/Standalone

=== Quick Reaction Force Paracommando Brigade ===
The Indonesian Air Force's Korpasgat have Paracommando Qualified Infantry Brigade.

No	SSI	Name	Commands' office	Part of
1.		1st Quick Reaction Force Paracommando Brigade	East Jakarta, Jakarta	Quick Reaction Force Paracommando Division
2.		2nd Quick Reaction Force Paracommando Brigade	Malang, East Java	Quick Reaction Force Paracommando Division
3.		3rd Quick Reaction Force Paracommando Brigade	Medan, North Sumatera	Quick Reaction Force Paracommando Division

=== Former Infantry Brigade ===
Previously existing Infantry Brigade units that has been liquidated, consolidated, or disbanded.

No	SSI	Name	Commands' office	Part of
1.		5th Infantry Brigade/Lukitasari		VII Military Regional Command/Diponegoro

== Training Regiment of the Infantry Forces Center (Resimen Pusat Kesenjataan Infanteri) ==
In addition to the brigades, there is also another regiment stationed at the Infantry Branch Center in the city of Bandung, West Java. The training regiment trains all officers, warrant officers, NCOs and enlisted personnel for basic skills intended for service in this branch. The Training Regiment falls under the responsibility of Commanding General Infantry (Komandan Pussenif), a general officer of lieutenant general rank, actual command of the regiment falls under the Director for Weapon Systems (Direktur Kesenjataan). The Infantry Branch Center was created on 9 May 1950 on the basis of both Republican infantry brigade depots and the educational institutions of the Royal Netherlands East Indies Army under the Indonesian Army Doctrine, Education and Training Development Command.
