= Rindam =

Main Regiments of the Military Area Commands (Indonesian: Resimen Induk Komando Daerah Militer, abbreviated Rindam) are Indonesian training centers and regimental depots serving newly recruited enlisted personnel of the 15 Military Area Commands of the Indonesian Army. These regiments are the regional command's home base for recruiting and training of personnel within their areas of responsibility.

== Definition ==
Rindams are defined as a military educational institution under the direct control of the Military Area Command for enlisted and non-commissioned officers (other than Akmil, Seskoad, and Secapa) which have the main task of helping organize military training and education for all ranks of the RMC (Kodam) to produce soldiers who are professional, reliable, quality and have achieved basic military skills and tactical work for peace and wartime actions and are loved by the people not just of their communities but of the country at large. Rindam has several units in charge of conducting first, vocational and qualification education (Secata, Secaba, Dodiklatpur, Dodikjur, and Dodikbelanegara). Main Regiments are stationed in all 21 territorial commands of the Indonesian Army and are stationed in key Indonesian cities.

== Organization ==
Each Main Regiment is led by a Commander commonly called Danrindam (Commandant of the Kodam Main Regiment) who is of Colonel rank, and is organized into :

- Headquarters
- Satuan Dodik Latpur (Combat Training Command Unit)
- Satuan Dodik Kejuruan (Specialized Training Command Unit)
- Sekolah Calon Bintara (Non-Commissioned Officer Candidate School)
- Sekolah Calon Tamtama (Enlisted Candidate School)
- Satuan Dodik Bela Negara (National Defense Training Command Unit)

When the Armed Forces Reserve Component was officially activated in 2021, 6 regional Rindam regiments gained an additional reserve battalion for the training and education of reserve personnel of the Army under these battalions, which come from all sectors of society. Each reserve battalion has 550 personnel and are under the direct control of the Rindam for training purposes.

The Commandant is assisted by the Main Regiments Executive Officer (Kesrindam) who holds the billet of a Lieutenant Colonel.

=== Regional NCO Candidate Schools ===
The Rindam NCO Candidate Schools or Sekolah Calon Bintara Rindam are the training battalions for basic and advanced training of newly promoted non-commissioned officers of the army's RMCs. These battalions provide necessary training for personnel advancement into NCO status. Civilian direct entry NCO cadets also train under these units and then directly enlist into the Army as sergeants.

== List of Rindam in Indonesia ==
The following are the 27 Main Regiments organized in each of the 27 Military Area Commands:

No	Name	Command Office	Command
1.	Kodam I / Bukit Barisan Main Regiment	Pematangsiantar	Kodam Bukit Barisan
2.	Kodam II / Sriwijaya Main Regiment	Karang Raja, Muara Enim	Kodam Sriwijaya
3.	Kodam Jaya Main Regiment	Pasar Rebo, East Jakarta	Kodam Jaya
4.	Kodam III / Siliwangi Main Regiment	Bandung	Kodam Siliwangi
5.	Kodam IV / Diponegoro Main Regiment	Magelang	Kodam Diponegoro
6.	Kodam V / Brawijaya Main Regiment	Malang	Kodam Brawijaya
7.	Kodam VI / Mulawarman Main Regiment	Banjarbaru	Kodam Mulawarman
8.	Kodam IX / Udayana Main Regiment	Tabanan Regency	Kodam Udayana
9.	Kodam VI / Tanjungpura Main Regiment	Singkawang	Kodam Tanjungpura
10.	Kodam XIII / Merdeka Main Regiment	Kakaskasen, Tomohon	Kodam Merdeka
11.	Kodim XIV / Hasanuddin Main Regiment	Pakatto, Gowa	Kodam Hasanuddin
12.	Kodim XV / Pattimura Main Regiment	Salahutu, Central Maluku	Kodam Pattimura
13.	Kodam XVII / Cenderawasih Main Regiment	Jayapura Regency	Kodam Cendrawasih
14.	Kodam XVIII / Kasuari Main Regiment	Manokwari	Kodam Kasuari
15.	Iskandar Muda Main Regiment	Mata Ie, Aceh Besar	Kodam Iskandar Muda
16.	Kodam XIX / Tuanku Tambusai Main Regiment		Kodam XIX/Tuanku Tambusai
17.	Kodam XX / Tuanku Imam Bonjol Main Regiment		Kodam XX/Tuanku Imam Bonjol
18.	Kodam XXI / Radin Inten Main Regiment		Kodam XXI/Radin Inten
19.	Kodam XXII / Tambun Bungai Main Regiment	Banjarbaru	Kodam XXII/Tambun Bungai
20.	Kodam XXIII / Palaka Wira Main Regiment		Kodam XXIII/Palaka Wira
21.	Kodam XXIV / Mandala Trikora Main Regiment		Kodam XXIV/Mandala Trikora
