= Hari Pahlawantoro =

Indonesian army general

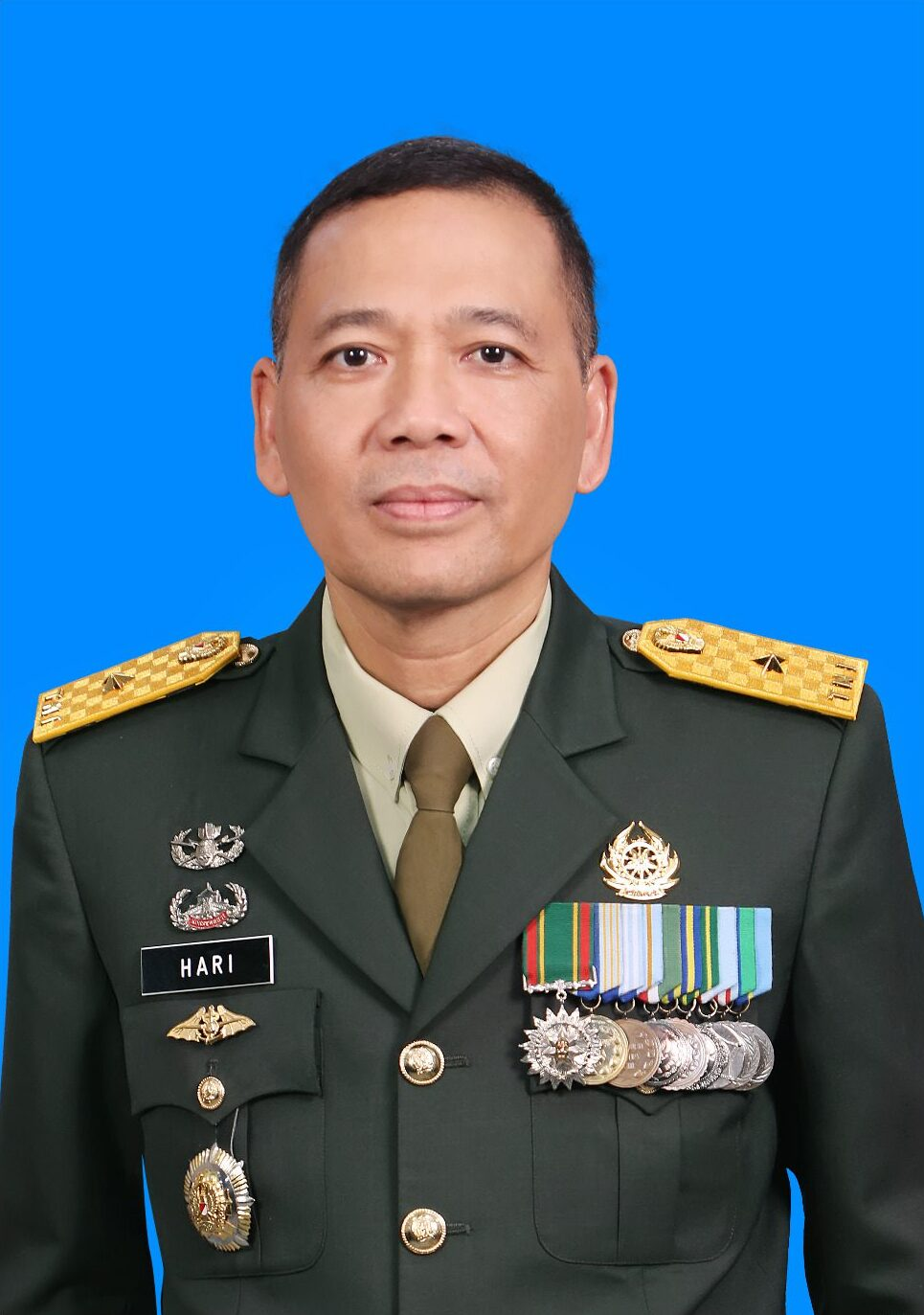
- Born: November 26, 1970 (age 55); East Java, Indonesia
- Military career
- Allegiance: Indonesia
- Branch: Indonesian Army
- Service years: 1992–present
- Rank: Brigadier general
- Unit: Engineer Corps
- Commands: Engineer Task Forces, Garuda Contingent XX-B/MONUC; Trenggalek Military District; 9th Combat Engineer Battalion; Nani Wartabone Military Area
- Conflicts: Ituri conflict

Hari Pahlawantoro (born 26 November 1970) is an Indonesian army general who is currently assigned to the army headquarters. Prior to his assignment, he was assigned to various territorial and combat unit, commanded an engineer task force in the Garuda Contingent, and served as the chief of army procurement services. He then served as the commander of the Nani Wartabone Military Area from 2024 to 2025.

== Career ==
Hari Pahlawantoro was born on 26 November 1970. He began his career in the army after graduating from the Indonesian Military Academy in 1992. In 2004, as a major, Hari was entrusted to command an engineer task force in the 20th Garuda Contingent. His task force of 163 men was sent to Bunia in the Democratic Republic of the Congo. The task forces provided health services to the locals, constructed roads, and assisted the local authorities in maintaining public infrastructure in the midst of the Ituri conflict. The task force was replaced by a new one in September 2005.

After his return to Indonesia, Hari commanded several territorial units in the army, including the 9th Combat Engineers Battalion in the Army Strategic Reserve Command from 2010 to 2011 and Trenggalek Military District. He became the engineer chief of the Wirabuana Regional Military Command in Sulawesi for about a year until 27 October 2015.

Less than a month later, on 13 November 2015, Hari officially became the engineer chief of the Brawijaya Regional Military Command in East Java. He ended his tenure as engineer chief on 5 December 2017 and was reassigned as the assistant for logistics to the commander of the Brawijaya Regional Military Command.

After his stint in East Java, Hari was appointed by the Commander of the Cenderawasih Regional Military Command in Papua, Yosua Pandit Sembiring, as his expert staff in economics. He served in the position until 2020 and was posted to the Army Procurement Services as the head of the material, engineering, construction, and services procurement section. Two years later, on 3 September 2022 Hari was made as the Chief of the Army Procurement Services and he received promotion to the rank of brigadier general on 14 October 2022.

Hari was named as the commander of the Nani Wartabone Military Area, which covers the Gorontalo province, on 1 April 2024. He officially assumed the position three days later. His tenure as the area's commander commenced on 28 May 2025, and he was reassigned to the army headquarters.
