= Andika Perkasa =

Indonesian general (born 1964)

General Andika Perkasa
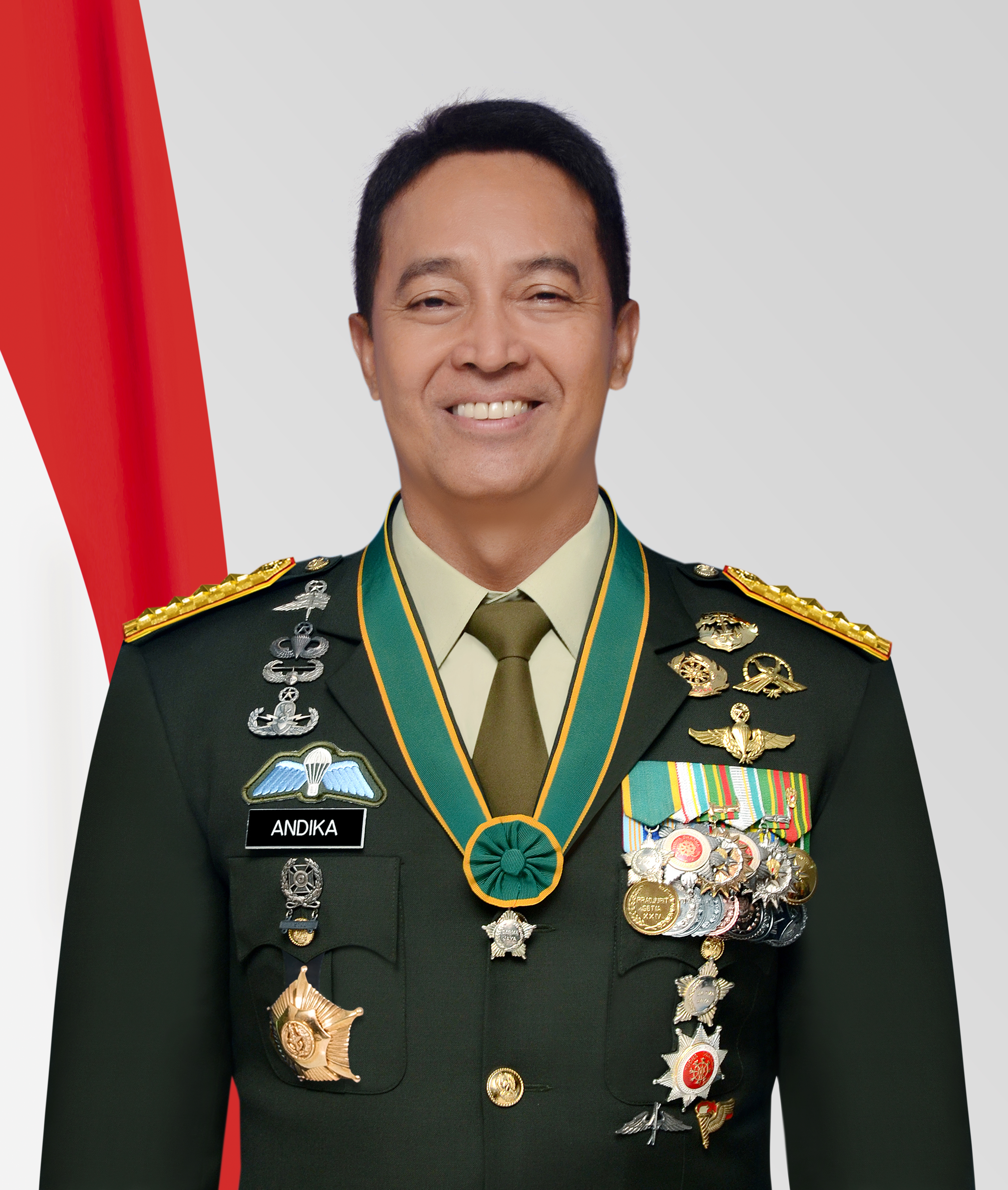

Commander of the National Armed Forces
- In office 17 November 2021 – 19 December 2022
- President: Joko Widodo
- Preceded by: ACM Hadi Tjahjanto
- Succeeded by: Admiral Yudo Margono

Chief of Staff of the Army
- In office 22 November 2018 – 17 November 2021
- Preceded by: General Mulyono
- Succeeded by: General Dudung Abdurachman

Commander of Army Strategic Command
- In office 23 July 2018 – 22 November 2018
- President: Joko Widodo
- Preceded by: Lieutenant General Agus Kriswanto
- Succeeded by: Lieutenant General Besar Harto Karyawan

Personal details
- Born: Fransiskus Xaverius Emanuel Andika Perkasa; 21 December 1964 (age 61) Bandung, West Java, Indonesia
- Party: PDI-P (since 2024)
- Spouse: Diah Erwiany
- Awards: US Legion of Merit (2020); Kartika Eka Paksi Utama (2019); Bintang Dharma (2008)

Military service
- Allegiance: Indonesia
- Branch/service: Indonesian Army
- Years of service: 1987–2022
- Rank: General
- Unit: Infantry (Kopassus); Indonesian Strategic Intelligence Agency; Presidential Security Force of Indonesia
- Commands: Commander of the Indonesian National Armed Forces; Chief of Staff of the Indonesian Army; Commander of the Army Strategic Command; Commander of the 12th Military Regional Command; Commander of the Presidential Security Force
- Battles/wars: Insurgency in East Timor; Insurgency in Aceh; Papua Conflict

Andika Muhammad Perkasa (born Fransiskus Xaverius Emanuel Andika Perkasa; 21 December 1964) is a retired Indonesian general who previously served as the 21st Commander of the Indonesian National Armed Forces (Panglima TNI). He was appointed by the President of Indonesia Joko Widodo in November 2021, replacing the retiring ACM Hadi Tjahjanto.

Upon graduating from the Military Academy in 1987, he began his career in the Infantry and was first commissioned to the 2nd Group Para Commandos, Army Special Forces Command in 1987. He then continued his studies in the United States for eight years. He became the Commander of the Presidential Security Force in 2014 and saw a rapid rise through his career, holding important and strategic positions and being promoted from a one-star brigadier general to a four-star general just within five years.

== Background ==
Perkasa was born in Bandung, West Java on 21 December 1964.

He is married (1992) to Diah Erwiany Trisnamurti Hendrati Hendropriyono, who is the daughter of the then Indonesian State Intelligence Agency chief, Hendropriyono. They have two sons, Alexander Akbar Wiratama Perkasa Hendropriyono, and Andrew Nanda Malik Perkasa Hendropriyono, and one daughter, Angela Adinda Nurrina Perkasa Hendropriyono.

== Education ==
=== Indonesia ===
- Indonesian Military Academy, graduated in 1987
- Indonesia Open University
- Indonesian Army Command and General Staff College, the best graduate of class XXXVII (37) 1999/2000.
- National Resilience Institute

=== International ===
- The Military College of Vermont, Norwich University (Northfield, Vermont, United States).
- National War College, National Defense University (Washington D.C., United States).
- Harvard University, (Cambridge, MA, USA).
- The Trachtenberg School of Public Policy and Public Administration, The George Washington University (Washington D.C., USA).

== Military career ==
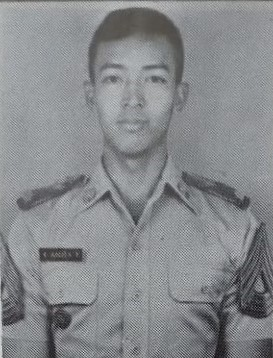
Perkasa as an officer cadet in the Indonesian Military Academy (Akmil), 1987

Perkasa graduated from the Indonesian Military Academy in 1987 (Class 1987) and was assigned to the Army Special Forces as a platoon commander. He spent most of his early career as a junior officer in the Army Special Forces for fifteen years, eventually later becoming a lieutenant colonel and a battalion commander in the unit by 2002. During his career in the Army Special Forces, at the rank of major in 2000–2001, he was temporarily assigned to the Department of Defence as an analyst at the Directorate of Defence Strategy Policy, then eventually assigned back to the Army Special Forces clandestine unit in 2002 as the commander of Battalion 32, Group 3 Sandi Yudha after being promoted to lieutenant colonel.

After serving as a battalion commander in the Army Special Forces, he was transferred to the territorial army in 2002, where he became the head section officer for Intelligence in the 051 "Wijayakarta" Military Area Command (Korem) under the Greater Jakarta Regional Command in 2002. Less than a year later, he was assigned to the Strategic Intelligence Agency (BAIS TNI). During his career in the Army Special Forces (Kopassus), Perkasa participated in various operations, such as in East Timor (1992), Aceh (1994), and Papua, and was also involved in the 2002 capture of Al-Qaeda member Omar al-Faruq in Bogor.

Between 2003 and 2011, Perkasa went to the United States where he received military education at the National War College and Norwich University, and also studied for a master's degree at Harvard University in addition to a doctorate at George Washington University. After returning to Indonesia, he was promoted to Colonel and was appointed the Commander of the Kodam Jaya Regional Training Regiment in 2011, and then in 2012, he was appointed Commander of the 023 "Kawal Samudera" Military Area Command (Korem) under the 1st (I) "Bukit Barisan" Regional Command in North Sumatra.

By 2013, he was promoted to brigadier general and was appointed the head of the Army Public Relations office. Several days after the inauguration of President Joko Widodo, Perkasa was appointed the commander of the Presidential Security Force and was promoted to major general. By 2016, he was appointed the commander of the 12th (XII) "Tanjungpura" Regional Command, and in early 2018 he was promoted to Lieutenant general and was appointed the head of the Indonesian Army Doctrine, Education and Training Development Command. In July 2018, Perkasa was appointed the Commander of the Army Strategic Command (Kostrad).

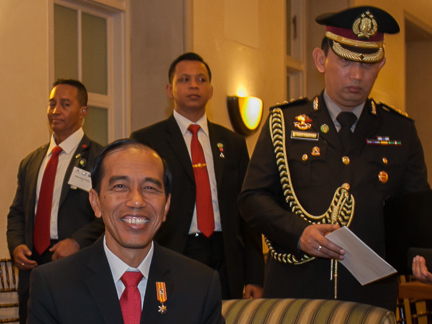
Major General Perkasa (far rear-left) when he was the commander of the Presidential Security Force monitoring President Joko Widodo during the US-ASEAN Business Council meeting in 2015.

On 22 November 2018, Perkasa was promoted to four-star general, before being appointed the Chief of Staff of the Indonesian Army. Perkasa was one of the four candidates proposed by Commander of the National Armed Forces Hadi Tjahjanto to replace the retiring General Mulyono.

As of 5 November 2021, Perkasa was the single candidate to replace the retiring ACM Hadi Tjahjanto by the President of Indonesia to the People's Representative Council. On 17 November 2021, Perkasa was officially promoted and assigned as Commander of the National Armed Forces by the President of Indonesia.

On 30 March 2022, Perkasa lifted the ban on descendants of the Communist Party of Indonesia from joining the military, stating that the ban had "no legal basis".

== Political career ==
After his retirement from the military, Perkasa joined the Indonesian Democratic Party of Struggle (PDI-P) in May 2024. He took part as PDI-P's candidate in the 2024 Central Java gubernatorial election, but was defeated by the KIM candidate Ahmad Luthfi.

== Awards and decorations ==
General Andika has received the following awards:

Right breast
Left breast

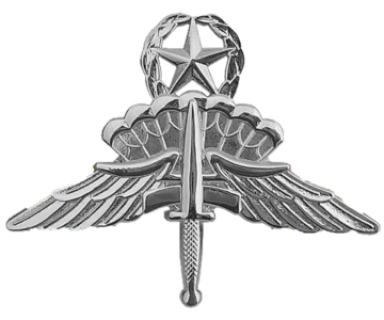
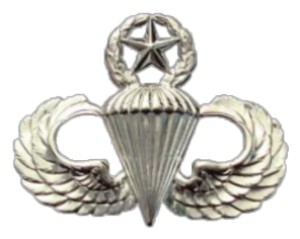
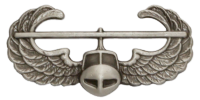
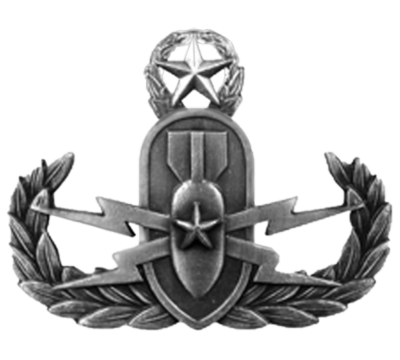
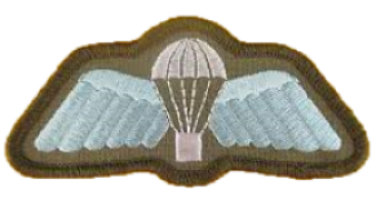
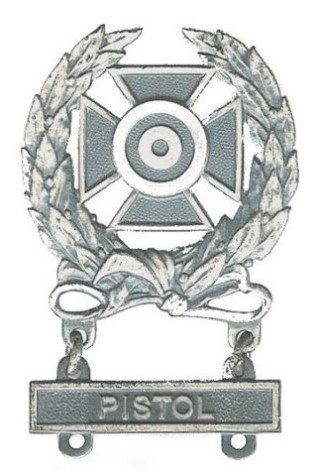

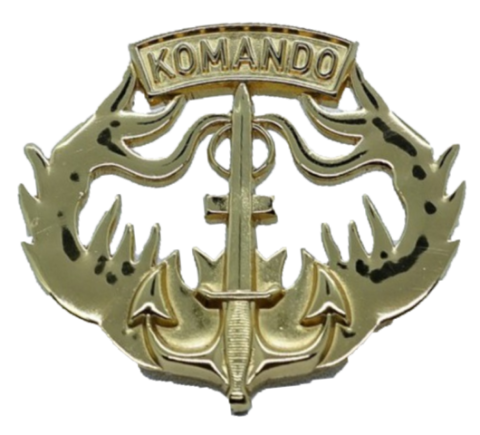
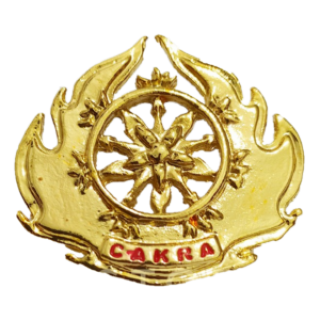
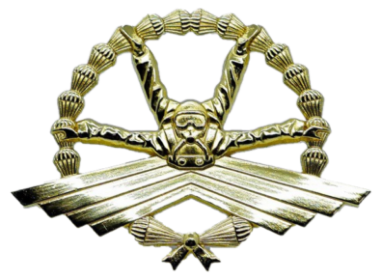
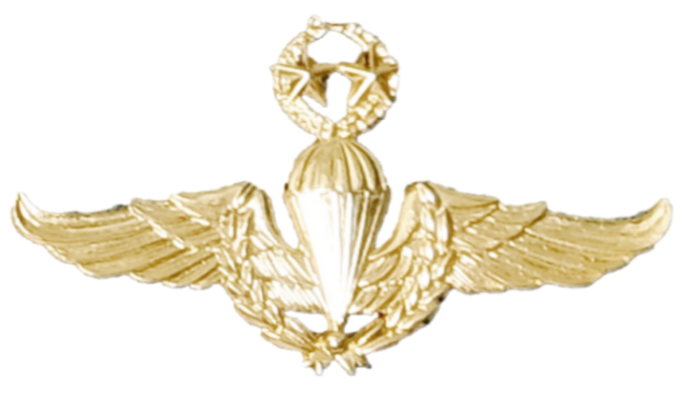
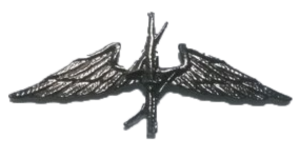
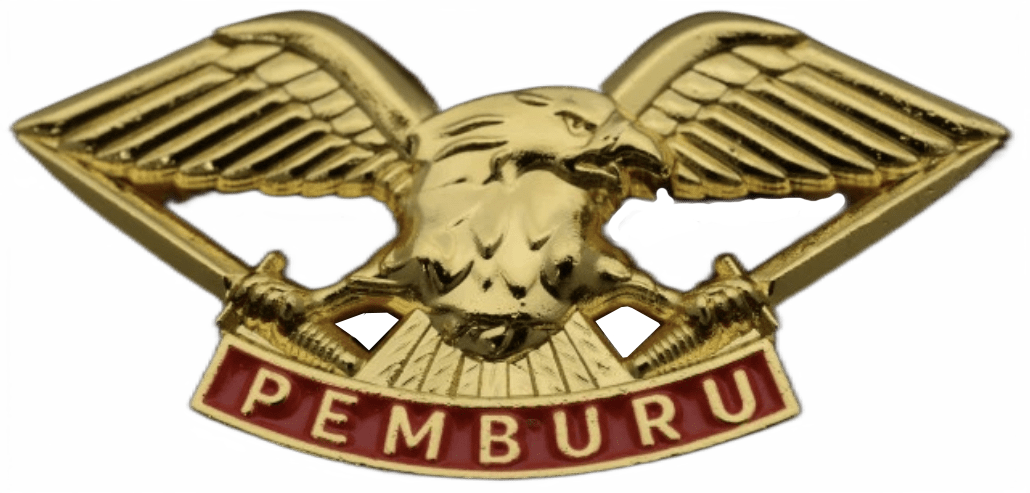
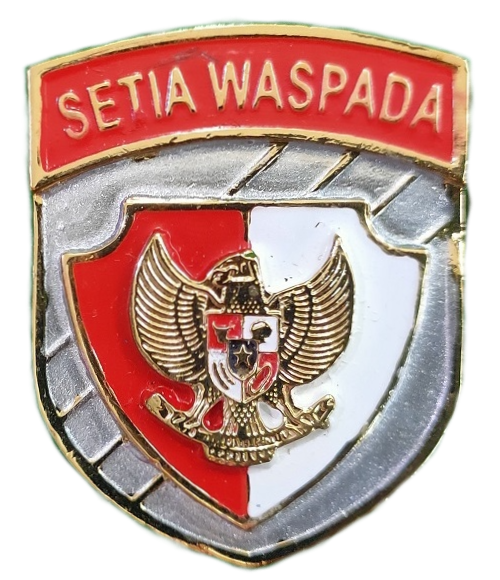
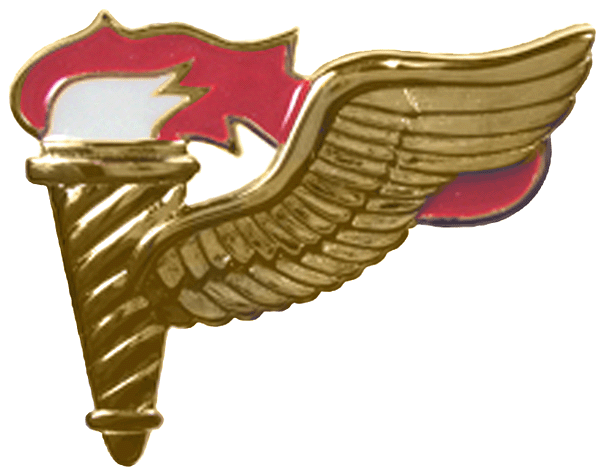

US Army Military Freefall Parachutist badge
US Army Master Parachutist badge
US Army Air Assault badge
US Army Master Explosive Ordnance Disposal badge
1st Battalion, Royal Australian Regiment Parachutist badge
US Army Expert Marksmanship badge with Pistol tab

Badge	Indonesian Army Special Forces "Commando" badge			
Badge	Indonesian Army Strategic Command "Chakra" badge		Indonesian Army Free fall badge	
Badge	Indonesian Army Master Parachutist badge			
1st row	Star of Mahaputera, 2nd Class (Bintang Mahaputera Adipradana) (2024)	Military Distinguished Service Star (Bintang Dharma) (2018)	Grand Meritorious Military Order Star, 1st Class (Bintang Yudha Dharma Utama) (2022)	Army Meritorious Service Star, 1st Class (Bintang Kartika Eka Pakçi Utama) (2019)
2nd row	Navy Meritorious Service Star, 1st Class (Bintang Jalasena Utama) (2019)	Air Force Meritorious Service Star, 1st Class (Bintang Swa Bhuwana Pakça Utama) (2019)	National Police Meritorious Service Star, 1st Class (Bintang Bhayangkara Utama) (2019)	Commander of the Legion of Merit - United States (2020), (2024)
3rd row	Pingat Jasa Gemilang - Tentera (P.J.G.) - Singapore (2022)	Commander of the Ordre national du Mérite - France (2022)	Darjah Paduka Keberanian Laila Terbilang Yang Amat Gemilang - Peringkat Pertama (D.P.K.T.) - Brunei (2022)	Medal of Merit - East Timor (2022)
4th row	Courageous Commander of the Most Gallant Order of Military Service (P.G.A.T.) - Malaysia (2022)	Honorary Officer of the Order of Australia (Military Division) (A.O.) - Australia (2022)	Darjah Utama Bakti Cemerlang (Tentera) (D.U.B.C.) - Singapura (2023)	Grand Meritorious Military Order Star, 2nd Class (Bintang Yudha Dharma Pratama) (2016)
5th row	Army Meritorious Service Star, 2nd Class (Bintang Kartika Eka Paksi Pratama)	Grand Meritorious Military Order Star, 3rd Class (Bintang Yudha Dharma Nararya)	Army Meritorious Service Star, 3rd Class (Bintang Kartika Eka Paksi Nararya)	Knight of the Order of Military Merit - Jordan
6th row	Medal for 32 Years Service in the Military (Satyalancana Kesetiaan 32 tahun)	Medal for Active Duty in the Army (Satyalancana Dharma Bantala)	Medal for 24 Years Service in the Military (Satyalancana Kesetiaan 24 tahun)	Medal for 16 Years Service in the Military (Satyalancana Kesetiaan 16 tahun)
7th row	Medal for 8 Years Service in the Military (Satyalancana Kesetiaan 8 tahun)	Military Operations in Aceh Service Medal (Satyalancana Gerakan Operasi Militer VII)	Medal for National Defense Service (Satyalancana Dharma Nusa)	Medal for Active Duty as a Border Guard (Satyalancana Wira Dharma)
8th row	Medal for Presidential and Vice Presidential Guards Personnel (Satyalancana Wira Siaga)	East Timor Military Campaign medal (Satyalancana Seroja)	Medal for Service as a Military Educator (Satyalancana Dwidya Sistha)	Medal for Providing an Example of Meritorious Personality (Satyalancana Wira Karya)
Badge	Indonesian Army Counter-terrorist badge			
Badge	Indonesian Army Hunter (Pemburu) badge			
Badge	Presidential Security Force (Setia Waspada) badge			
Badge	Pathfinder badge			

Honorary badges
Indonesian Army Field Artillery badge (2018)
Indonesian Army Cesar badge (2018)
Indonesian Army Astros badge (2018)
Indonesian Air Force 1st Class Pilot badge (2019)
Indonesian Marine Corps Amphibious reconnaissance badge (2022)
Indonesian Navy Counter-terrorist badge (2022)
Indonesian Air Force Special Forces Command badge (2022)
Indonesian Air Force Counter-terrorist badge (2022)
Indonesian Air Force Combat Controller badge (2022)

Military offices
Preceded by Hadi Tjahjanto	Commander of the Indonesian National Armed Forces; 17 November 2021 − 19 December 2022	Succeeded by Yudo Margono
Preceded by Mulyono	Chief of Staff of Indonesian Army; 22 November 2018 − 17 November 2021	Succeeded by Dudung Abdurachman
Preceded by Agus Kriswanto	Commander of Kostrad; 15 July 2018 − 22 November 2018	Succeeded by Besar Harto Karyawan
