= 26th Infantry Brigade (Indonesia) =

- Brigade Infanteri 26/Gurana Piarawaimo
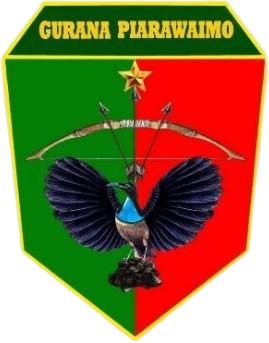
- Logo of the 26th Infantry Brigade
- Founded: 29 December 2020
- Branch: Indonesian Army
- Part of: Kodam Kasuari
- Garrison/HQ: Teluk Bintuni, West Papua

The 26h Infantry Brigade (Indonesian: Brigade Infanteri 26/Gurana Piarawaimo; abbr. Brigif 26/GP) is an infantry brigade of the Indonesian Army under the Kasuari Military Command. It is based in Teluk Bintuni Regency.

== History ==
After the Kasuari Military Command was established in 2016, it initially lacked organic combat elements above the battalion size. In April 2020, Army Chief of Staff Andika Perkasa ordered the formation of an infantry brigade for Kasuari, and on 29 December 2020 the formation was completed and inaugurated. The 762nd and the 764th Infantry Battalions were transferred from Kasuari's direct command to that of the brigade, in addition to the newly formed 763rd Battalion.

By April 2023, the brigade's base in Teluk Bintuni still lacked some infrastructure and facilities.

== Organization ==
As of 2025, the brigade consists of the following units:

- 26th Infantry Brigade
  - 762nd Infantry Battalion – rifle companies A-D plus supporting units, based in Sorong, Southwest Papua
  - 763rd Infantry Battalion – rifle companies A-C plus supporting units, based in Teluk Bintuni Regency
  - 764th Infantry Battalion – rifle companies A-C plus supporting units, based in Kaimana Regency
