= Petrus Lengkong =

Indonesian military officer and artist

Benius Petrus Peter Lengkong (12 December 1946 – 5 January 2018), better known as Petrus Lengkong, was an Indonesian artist and former Indonesian Army officer best known for popularizing Dayak arts, especially wood carving and sculpture. Due to his work in preserving Dayak arts and culture, he received several awards from Indonesian government.

== Early life ==
Petrus Lengkong was born in the village of Rangkang, Bengkayang Regency, West Kalimantan, on 12 December 1946. His parents were both Minahasan migrants from North Sulawesi. Since his childhood, he was interested in native Dayak culture which were practiced by people around him. At the age of 13, he often participated in traditional rituals and dances.

== Career ==
During the Indonesia–Malaysia Confrontation, he volunteered to join the Indonesian Army as a soldier. During his spare time in the barracks, he started practicing wood carving and making several Dayak sculptures. Later, he was also deployed against insurgents of the North Kalimantan Communist Party and, beginning in 1974, was deployed for three years in Indonesian-occupied East Timor. He was among several soldiers chosen to receive special training from Kodam XII/Tanjungpura, where he then rose through the ranks. He was offered higher education in the Indonesian Military Academy but refused and decided to retire from the military in 1994 with rank of master corporal. During his time in the military, he continued to practice wood carving during his spare time. He started to focus on art around 1996 after his retirement.

Among his arts were Dayak traditional carvings and paintings with Dayak motifs, which he improvised with his own style based on interpretation of Dayak philosophies. He was offered several times by the government to patent his original designs under his name, which he refused. He also choreographed dances based on Dayak culture and nature. In total, he produced 37 wood carving statues and 14 paintings, from which he garnered 14 different awards, including from the government of West Kalimantan, the Ministry of Education and Culture, and the Ministry of Tourism and Creative Economy. In 2011 he was invited as a guest by the West Kalimantan Department of Forestry to the IndoGreen Expo in Jakarta. As a senior artist, he appeared in several events abroad such as in France, Germany, the Netherlands, and Malaysia.

== Death ==
His health deteriorated after suffering from cholecystitis and an infection in his respiratory organs. He died on 5 January 2018 at St. Vincentius General Hospital, Singkawang.
