= Agus Isrok Mikroj =

Indonesian army general

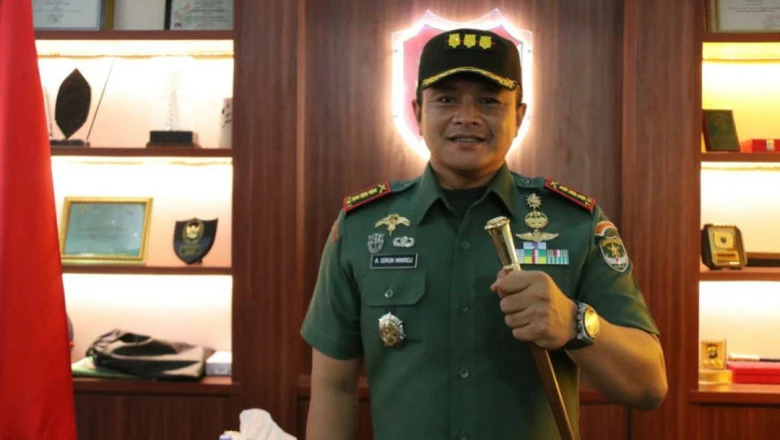
- Born: 6 August 1975 (age 51); Serang, West Java, Indonesia
- Education: Indonesian Military Academy; General Achmad Yani University
- Military career
- Allegiance: Indonesia
- Branch: Indonesian Army
- Service years: 1997–present
- Rank: Major general
- Service number: 11970036740785
- Unit: Infantry
- Commands: Depok Military District

Agus Isrok Mikroj (born 6 August 1975) is an Indonesian army general who is currently serving as the senior expert staff to the armed forces commander for social, culture, law, human rights, and drugs. He served in the position since 2025. He began his military career in Kopassus, but was removed from the unit after being convicted for recreational drug use. Upon his release, he was assigned to various positions in the Presidential Security Force, State Intelligence Agency, army territorial units, the Ministry of Defence, and the army headquarters.

== Career ==
Agus Isrok Mikroj was born on 6 August 1975 in Serang. Agus's father, Subagyo Hadi Siswoyo, was a military general who served as the army chief of staff. Agus graduated from the Indonesian Military Academy in 1997 and underwent infantry and English language course before starting his career as an officer in Kopassus, Indonesia's army special forces. He was appointed as the deputy commander of the special unit in the 441th detachment of Kopassus.

On 8 August 1999, Agus and his friend, Donny Hendriawan, was arrested by the police at a hotel in West Jakarta after being found using drugs. The police was part of the Kilat Jaya Operation, held by the West Jakarta police to arrest drug users. Due to his father's position at that time, Agus evaded trial and was sent to his parents' home by the police. The case was reopened a year later and he was put to trial by the military court on 22 June 2000. Agus was sentenced to four years in prison, a fine of Rp 10 million, and discharged from the army. He appealed the verdict and managed to revert his discharge as well as lowering his sentence and fine. Agus was imprisoned for seven months and was released on 18 November 2001.

Agus continued his service after imprisonment and underwent an advanced infantry course in 2008. He also studied at the Navy Command and Staff College in 2012 and the General Achmad Yani University, where he received a degree in governance sciences. He then served as the chief of operation in the Wira Sakti Military Area Command in Bali from 18 January until 25 September 2012. Afterwards, he was reassigned to the Udayana Regional Military Command as assistant officer for operations.

From Bali, Agus was transferred to the Presidential Security Force as the commander of the 2nd detachment in Group C, deputy commander of Group C, and deputy assistant for operations. His posting in the Presidential Security Force ended on 11 January 2019 and he was assigned to the State Intelligence Agency as a senior agent. Less than a year later, on 9 August Agus became the Commander of the Depok Military District. During his tenure in Depok, the military district received grants in the form of vehicles from the city government. The military district also played a major role in handling the COVID-19 pandemic by assisting the local authority in distributing masks and vaccination. Aside from handling COVID-19, the military district was tasked to safeguard the 2020 Depok local elections.

After three years in Depok, in December 2021 Agus was reassigned to the Siliwangi Regional Military Command as the deputy commander of the main regiment of the regional military command. Agus underwent military education at the Indonesian Armed Forces Staff and Command School for about a year. He received promotion to the rank of brigadier general on 3 August and he was assigned to the defense ministry as the Director for Defense Resources on 28 August.

On 12 December 2023, Agus became the chief of the army feasibility services. He continued to held his office in the Ministry of Defence until 5 January 2024. He served as the chief of the army feasibility services until 28 May 2025 and was promoted to the post of the senior expert staff to the armed forces commander for social, culture, law, human rights, and drugs. He was promoted to major general on 27 May 2025.
