= F. X. Sudjasmin =

Indonesian army officer (1943–2021)

Lieutenant General F. X. Sudjasmin
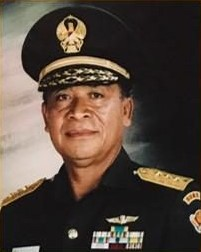
- Born: Fransiskus Xaverius Sudjasmin; 26 August 1943; Salatiga, Japanese East Indies
- Died: 22 January 2021 (aged 77); Jakarta, Indonesia
- Spouse: Agnes Situmeang
- Military career
- Allegiance: Indonesia
- Branch: Indonesian Army
- Service years: 1964–1997
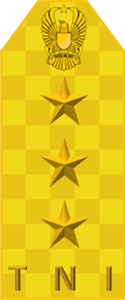
- Rank: Lieutenant General
- Service number: 19726
- Unit: Infantry

Lieutenant General Fransiskus Xaverius Sudjasmin (26 August 1943 – 22 January 2021) was an Indonesian military officer. He served as the deputy chief of staff of the Indonesian Army from 1995 until 1997.

== Early life and military education ==
Sudjasmin was born on 26 August 1943 in Salatiga. Both his mother and father were Javanese. He attended the National Military Academy in 1961 and graduated as a first lieutenant in 1964.

== Military career ==
A year after Sudjasmin graduated from the academy, the 30 September Movement occurred. He was deployed to crush the Indonesian Communist Party. From 1965 until 1987, he was promoted several times, from first lieutenant to colonel. Sudjasmin's command assignments during this period were: Platoon Commander in the 123rd Infantry Battalion, Company Commander in the 123rd Infantry Battalion, Section 2 Officer in the 121st Infantry Battalion, Deputy Commander of the 121st Infantry Battalion, Head of the 4th Section in the 7th Infantry Brigade, teacher in the Regional Training Regiment of the Siliwangi Regional Military Command (RMC), Head of the 2nd Section in the 15th Infantry Brigade, Commander of the 320th Infantry Battalion, Commander of the Non-Commissioned Officer Training School in the Siliwangi RMC, Head of Research and Development Bureau in PBN-VI, Chief of Staff of the Wira Dharma Military Resort (covering the now-dissolved East Timor province), Assistant for Territorial Affairs to Chief of Staff of the Udayana RMC, and as the personal secretary to the Chief of Staff of the Indonesian Army.

From 12 January 1987, Sudjasmin, who at the time was a colonel, became the Commander of the Salatiga Military Resort. During his tenure as commander, Sudjasmin received a promotion to brigadier general in July 1988. He served as a commander until 12 September 1988 and became the Chief of Staff of the 1st Division of the Army Strategic Command. Sudjasmin briefly assumed the chief of staff post, as on 6 September 1988 he became the commander of the division. He served as commander for a year and was transferred to Irian Jaya (now Papua) on 11 October 1989 to become the chief of staff of the Trikora Regional Military Command (covering Maluku and Irian Jaya). Sudjasmin was relieved of his position on 27 April 1991 and was instructed to study in the National Resilience Institute. He graduated from the institute in 1992.

After finishing his study at the institute, Sudjasmin was posted to South Sumatra and assumed office as the chief of staff of the Sriwijaya Military Region on 24 February 1992. Sudjasmin only held the office for 159 days, as on 31 July 1992 he was replaced by Soeyono. During the chief of staff handover, an unofficial singing contest was held, with Theo Syafei (Sudjasmin's chief of staff predecessor) and Soewardi as the judges. Sudjasmin joined the contest and won first place, defeating three other contestants.

After his brief stint as a chief of staff, Sudjasmin was promoted to commander of the military region on 7 August 1992, replacing Soewardi. In accordance with the dual function of the military at that time, Sudjasmin also became a member of the Golkar party, the ruling party at that time.

Several months after, a friendly football match was held between officers from the armed forces and politicians from Golkar. Sudjasmin almost became the team's captain, but Sudjasmin's chief of staff, Soeyono, replaced him. The armed forces won with a score of 6–1. During the half-time break, Sudjasmin mocked the Golkar team for failing to score any goals.

Sudjasmin was relieved of his position of commander on 3 August 1993. Seventeen days later, Sudjasmin was posted to Jakarta and became the Inspector General of the Indonesian Army. Sudjasmin became the inspector general for about two years, as on 27 February 1995, he became the Deputy Chief of Staff of the Indonesian Army, the second highest position in the Indonesian Army. Sudjasmin also became a member of the Honorary Council of Officers (DKP, Dewan Kehormatan Perwira), an extraordinary council that was held to investigate the 12 January 1995 shootings in Liquiçá, East Timor. A year later, on 3 June 1996, Sudjasmin was inaugurated as a member of the People's Consultative Assembly, replacing his Deputy Chief of Staff predecessor Soerjadi. He served as the member of the People's Consultative Assembly until 1 October 1997. During his tenure as the Deputy Chief of Staff of the Indonesian Army, Sudjasmin led an Army Chief of Staff Consideration Board meeting, which discussed the rank promotions for soldiers who were involved in the hostage release operation in Irian Jaya.

Sudjasmin officially retired from the military at the end of May 1997. He handed over his office to Subagyo HS on 4 June 1997. A retirement ceremony for Sudjasmin and 96 other retired flag officers was held on 11 November in Magelang. He attended the ceremony by riding a motorbike alone from Jakarta to Magelang.

== Later life and death ==
After his retirement from the military, Sudjasmin worked as a board member in several companies, namely Bintuni Minaraya, Daya Guna Samudera and Lippo Karawaci.

Sudjasmin died on 22 January 2021 in Jakarta.

== Personal life ==
Sudjasmin was married to Agnes Ruminsan Situmeang. The marriage resulted in five children, namely Christine Retno YW, Adrian R. Batara, Yohanes Bosco Sahat Sampurno, Stella Maris Retno Tiurida Sudjasmin and Agnes Retno Adriani Sudjamin.

Sudjasmin was a Catholic.

== Awards ==
Indonesia:

- Military Distinguished Service Star (Indonesian: Bintang Dharma)
- Star of Yudha Dharma, 2nd Class (Indonesian: Bintang Yudha Dharma Pratama)
- Star of Yudha Dharma, 3rd Class (Indonesian: Bintang Yudha Dharma Nararya)
