= Babinsa =

Non-commissioned Indonesian territorial army officer

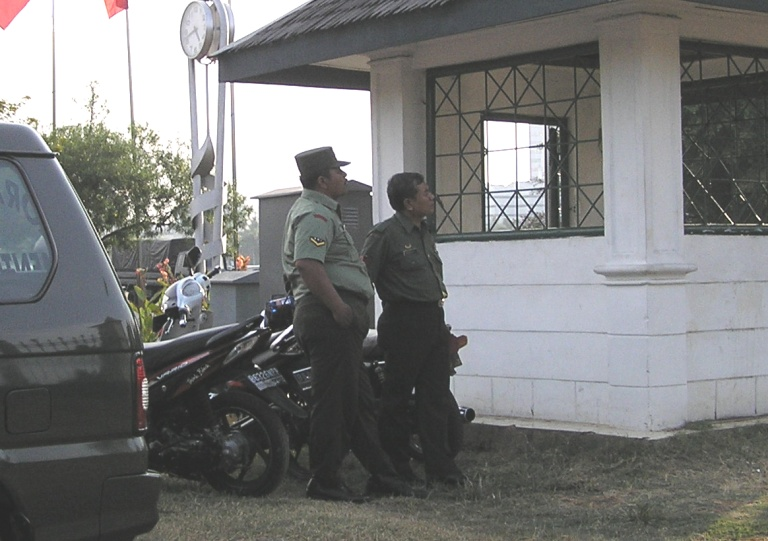
Babinsa officers monitoring an Independence Day Ceremony in Indonesia

Babinsa (from Indonesian: Bintara Pembina Desa, lit. "Village Trustee NCO") is a senior Indonesian territorial army Non-commissioned officer or senior Enlisted rank official who is in charge for carrying out territorial defence, development and monitoring duties for a community in the village/Kelurahan level in Indonesia. They report to and are under the command of the local Military Sector Command (Koramil). In urban areas, Babinsas hold the rank of sergeant major or master sergeant, and in rural areas Babinsas hold the rank of master corporal.

== History ==
The history of the Babinsas in Indonesia can be traced back to the New Order era under the Suharto regime. During the era of Suharto's dictatorship and his dependence on the military in his governance, Babinsas were used as the regime's political power in the villages. Babinsas were tasked to gather intelligence on people who were indicated as political dissidents of the regime. In East Timor, they were used for active monitoring and surveillance of the respective community, by taking part in traditional suco councils and to single out potential resistance fighters. It was just after the Fall of Suharto in 1998, the roles of the Babinsas as political powers in the villages were slowly eradicated by President B. J. Habibie to revert them to their original roles as defence representative village trustees.

== Duties and tasks ==
The Babinsa as a community partner, is expected to be able to overcome social problems that can disrupt the integrity of the community's unity by being actively involved in community activities in their area, and also being active in carrying out activities which is to increase the awareness of national defence towards members of the community. As a territorial defence official, Babinsas are also expected to help and become advisors for villagers in need to improve and help realize the nation's welfare and defence from the lowest level of society. Babinsas are also tasked to support and help civil authorities, law enforcement and security in their area, especially during the COVID-19 pandemic, Babinsas are required to be the front-liners in socializing the importance of compliance to health protocols and the importance of vaccination towards villagers and members of the community, especially in rural areas where illiteracy still exists.

The ability of the Babinsas to determine the success of their territorial duties is to coordinate regularly with relevant officials in the village or Kelurahan such as community leaders, religious leaders and youth leaders to avoid social disturbance and threats in the community. The capabilities that Babinsas must obtain are:

- Territorial Intelligence
- Regional Development in the village level
- Regional Monitoring and Supervision
- Mentoral skills towards villagers and village leaders
- Ability as a Development Innovator

Babinsas are also able and responsible to track down and prevent members of their community from radical and extremist ideologies which may lead to terrorism, by this coordinating with the Community Police Officers (Bhabinkamtibmas).

== Position of the Village Trustee Non-Commissioned Officer ==
=== Authority ===
Babinsas are not law enforcement officers. Village/Kelurahan trustee officers from the Indonesian National Police are the Community Police Officers (Bintara Pembina Keamanan dan Ketertiban Masyarakat abbreviated "Bhabinkamtibmas") which coordinate with the Babinsa closely in monitoring their areas.

==== Jurisdiction ====
- Babinsa = Territorial defence management. Representative of the Indonesian Army to their community
- Babinpotmar = Territorial defence management. Representative of the Indonesian Navy to their community
- Babinpotdirga/Babinsa = Territorial defence management. Representative of the Indonesian Air Force to their community
- Bhabinkamtibmas = Security and Law enforcement official. Representative of the National Police to their community

=== Identification ===
Army Babinsas wear a red armband on their upper-left sleeve bearing the word "BABINSA" and they wear the same uniform as other army personnel, sometimes in camo uniform and sometimes in service uniform. As majority of serving personnel come from the Infantry Branch, they wear army-green berets as their headdress in service dress.

== See also ==
- Regional Military Command
- Non-Commissioned Officer
