= Mulyono =

Indonesian general

General (Ret.) Mulyono
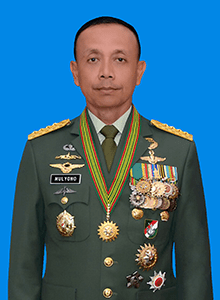
- Born: 12 January 1961 (age 65); Boyolali, Central Java, Indonesia
- Military career
- Allegiance: Indonesia
- Branch: Indonesian Army
- Service years: 1983–2018
- Rank: General
- Commands: Chief of Staff of Indonesian Army; Commander of Kostrad; Commander of Kodam Jaya

General (Ret.) Mulyono (born 12 January 1961) is an Indonesian former general who previously served as the Chief of Staff of the Indonesian Army (Indonesian: Kepala Staf Angkatan Darat, abbreviated Kasad or KSAD). He was appointed by President of Indonesia Joko Widodo in 2015, replacing Gatot Nurmantyo who became commander (Panglima) of the Indonesian National Armed Forces.

Mulyono had graduated from the Indonesian Military Academy in 1983. Before becoming chief of staff, he had served as Chief of the Indonesian Strategic Reserve Command (Kostrad).

== Military career ==
Mulyono graduated from Akmil (Indonesian Military Academy) in 1983 and first served as platoon commander in Sulawesi (712nd infantry battalion, 7th Military Regional Command). He later became company commander and operational officer before continuing to advanced officer education in Bandung, staying there as a member of the teaching staff until 1995.

His career carried on and he became battalion commander in 1st Military Regional Command by 1997, and then was promoted to commander of the Samarinda military district (part of 6th Military Regional Command) in 2000. He was transferred to Kostrad in 2006, initially as operational assistant to the Kostrad commander, before moving back to Magelang in 2009 to serve as commander of the cadet regiment. He was promoted to brigadier general on 10 May 2011. Until 2013, he took up multiple positions in the Army's educational and training center before becoming operational assistant to the army chief of staff in 2013. He was promoted to a major general on 22 August 2013.

On 21 March 2014, he was moved to Jakarta to serve as the commander of the capital's military province Kodam Jaya, replacing its former commander E Hudawi Lubis (who moved to the KSAD's office). During the aforementioned position, he publicly challenged Jakarta's governor Basuki Tjahaja Purnama to normalize Jakarta's rivers and illegal street vendors, offering support from Kodam Jaya's personnel.

Six months into his leadership in Kodam Jaya, he was transferred to Kostrad and became its commander, replacing Gatot Nurmantyo who became KSAD. Mulyono was further promoted to lieutenant general on 3 October 2014.

Upon the appointment of Gatot as Commander of TNI in 2015, Mulyono was selected from three likely candidates to replace him and he became KSAD on 15 July 2015. Shortly afterwards, he was made a four-star general on 27 July.

He was set to retire in 2019. On 22 November 2018, Kostrad commander Andika Perkasa was appointed to replace him.

== Honours ==

Star of Mahaputera, 3rd Class (Bintang Mahaputera Utama) (2020)	Military Distinguished Service Star (Bintang Dharma) (2015)	Army Meritorious Service Star, 1st Class (Bintang Kartika Eka Pakçi Utama) (20 January 2016)
Navy Meritorious Service Star, 1st Class (Bintang Jalasena Utama) (2017)	Air Force Meritorius Service Star, 1st Class (Bintang Swa Bhuwana Paksa Utama) (2017)	National Police Meritorious Service Star, 1st Class (Bintang Bhayangkara Utama) (2016)
Grand Meritorious Military Order Star, 2nd Class (Bintang Yudha Dharma Pratama)	Army Meritorious Service Star, 2nd Class (Bintang Bintang Kartika Eka Pakçi Pratama)	Grand Meritorious Military Order Star, 3rd Class (Bintang Yudha Dharma Nararya)
Army Meritorious Service Star, 3rd Class (Bintang Bintang Kartika Eka Pakçi Nararya)	Courageous Commander of the Most Gallant Order of Military Service (Pingat Panglima Gagah Angkatan Tentera) - Malaysia (2017)	Meritorious Service Medal (Military) (Pingat Jasa Gemilang) (Tentera) - Singapore (2018)
Military Long Service Medal, 32 Years (Satyalancana Kesetiaan 32 Tahun)	Army Service Medal (Satyalancana Dharma Bantala)	Military Long Service Medal, 24 Years (Satyalancana Kesetiaan 24 Tahun)
Military Long Service Medal, 16 Years (Satyalancana Kesetiaan 16 Tahun)	Military Long Service Medal, 8 Years (Satyalancana Kesetiaan 8 Tahun)	Military Operation Service Medal IX Raksaka Dharma (Satyalancana Gerakan Operasi Militer "GOM" IX Raksaka Dharma)
Timor Military Campaign Medal w/2 gold star (Satyalancana Seroja (Ulangan II))	Military Instructor Service Medals (Satyalancana Dwidya Sistha)	Social Welfare Medal (Satyalancana Kebaktian Sosial)

== See also ==
- Indonesian military ranks
- Ade Supandi, navy chief of staff

Military offices
Preceded by Gatot Nurmantyo	Chief of Staff of Indonesian Army; 15 July 2015–22 November 2018	Succeeded by Andika Perkasa
Preceded by Gatot Nurmantyo	Commander of Kostrad; 26 September 2014–15 July 2015	Succeeded by Edy Rahmayadi
Preceded by Erwin Hudawi Lubis	Commander of Kodam Jaya; 21 March 2014–26 September 2014	Succeeded by Agus Sutomo
