= Military Regional Command =

Military districts of the Indonesian Army

Military Regional Commands in Indonesia as of 2026

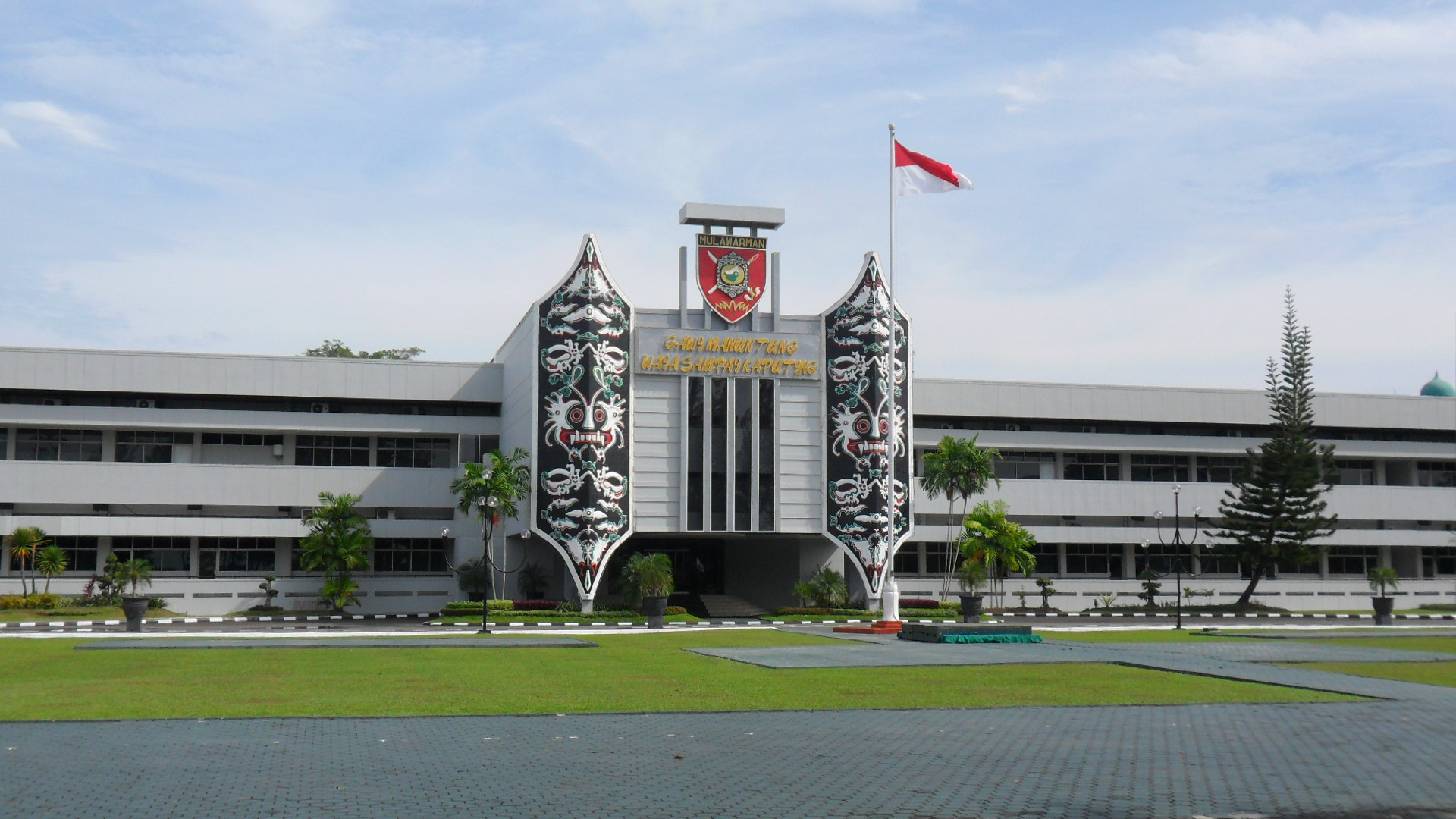
The VI Military Regional Command/Mulawarman covering East and North Kalimantan

The Indonesian Military Regional Commands (Indonesian: Komando Daerah Militer; abbreviated Kodam) also known officially as Military Area Commands are military districts of the Indonesian Army that function for the territorial defense of various regions within the country. They cover one or multiple provinces.

== History ==
The Armed Forces' military regions are known as Kodam. Their organization was established by General Soedirman, following the model of the German Wehrkreise system. The system was later codified in Strategy Order No.1 (Surat Perintah Siasat No.1), signed by General Soedirman in November 1948.

The Army's structure underwent various reorganisations throughout its early years. From 1946 to 1952, the Army was organized into combined arms divisions. These were consolidated in 1951 and then dissolved in 1952. From 1952 to 1958–59, the Army was organised into seven Territorial Armies (Tentara & Teritorium) composed of regiments and independent formations at battalion level and below. In August 1958, the Indonesian Army reconsolidated its territorial organization. This created sixteen regional commands, which retained earlier divisional titles; the Siliwangi Division, for example, became Kodam VI/Siliwangi. The Kodam were subdivided administratively into Areas (the former territorial regiments), Districts (the former regimental battalions), and District Sectors, and operationally composed of several specialty battalions and in some regional commands, an infantry brigade.

A reorganisation in 1985 made significant changes in the army chain of command. The four multiservice Regional Defence Commands (Komando Wilayah Pertahanan) and the National Strategic Forces Command (Komando Strategis Nasional) were eliminated from the defense structure, re-establishing the Military Regional Commands (Komando Daerah Militer) as the key organisation for strategic, tactical, and territorial operations for all services. The 16 regions were reduced to just 10. The chain of command flowed directly from the ABRI commander via the Chief of Staff of the Army to the ten territorial commanders, and then to subordinate army territorial commands. In 1999, the number of regions grew to 10, and as of 2024, there are around 15 in active operation.

The territorial commands incorporate provincial and district commands each with infantry battalions, sometimes a cavalry battalion, artillery, or engineers. The number of activated infantry brigades is increasing. Some have Raider battalions attached.

Six new regional commands were created on 10 August 2025. Additional six new regional commands were created on 5 October 2026, and so the number of regions grew to 27.

== Organization of Regional Commands ==
Each Military Regional or Area Command (Kodam) is led by a major general, assisted by a chief of staff who holds the rank of brigadier general. Kodams oversee several territorial formations under its command, which are:

- Korem or Indonesian: Komando Resor Militer also known as Military Subarea Command or Military Resort Command is a territorial army office covering a large area or multiple regencies (Kabupaten). They are further divided into two types which are type "A" and type "B". They are commanded by a brigadier general for type "A" and a colonel for type "B" respectively. It is below the Kodam and is responsible for Military Districts or Kodims.
- Kodim or Indonesian: Komando Distrik Militer also known as Military District Command is a territorial army office covering a City or Regency level. They are further divided into three types which are "independent", type "A" and type "B". They are commanded by a Colonel (for Independent and type "A"), and a Lieutenant Colonel for type "B" respectively. It is below the Korem and oversees Koramils under its supervision.
- Koramil or Indonesian: Komando Rayon Militer also known as Military Subdistrict Command is a territorial army office covering a district (kecamatan, distrik, kapanewon, and kemantren). They are further divided into two types, "A" and "B", commanded by a Major for type "A" and a Captain for type "B" respectively. It is below the Kodim. Babinsa offices and bureaux fall under its control.
  - Babinsa or Indonesian: Bintara Pembina Desa, lit. 'Village Trustee' also known as Village Management Senior NCO is a senior army Non-commissioned Officer (usually holding the rank of Sergeant Major) or a senior Enlisted rank personnel (usually holding the rank of Master corporal) who is in charge for carrying out territorial development and monitoring duties for a community in the village/Kelurahan level. Babinsa NCOs fall under the control of the local Koramil unit.
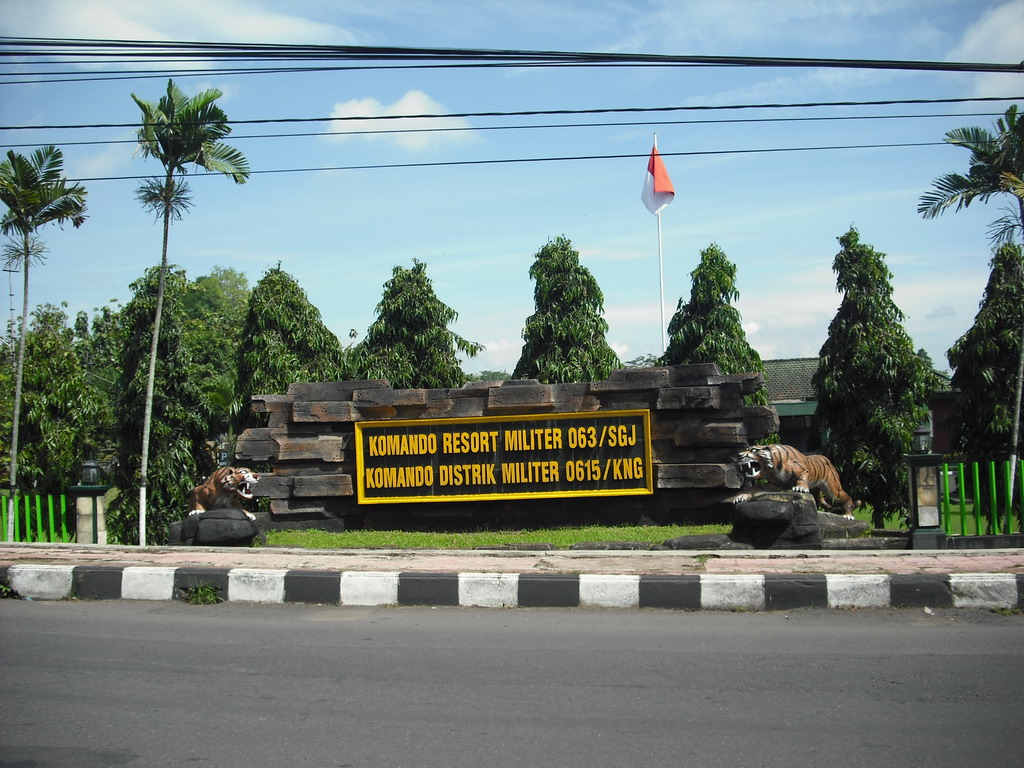
The 063 "Sunan Gunung Jati" Military Area Command (Korem 063) in Cirebon, under Kodam III/Siliwangi

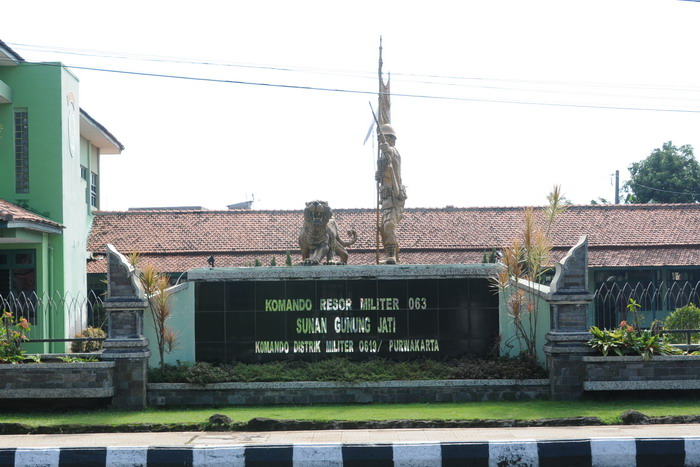
The 0619 Purwakarta Military District Command (Kodim 0619), under Korem 063

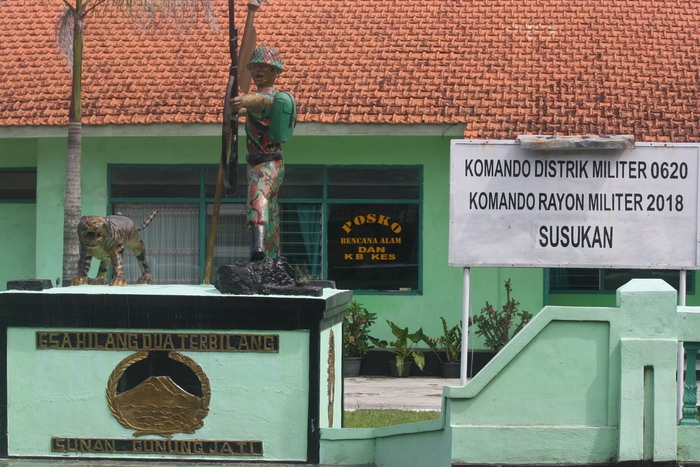
The 2018 Susukan Military Sector Command (Koramil 2018) in Cirebon Regency, under Kodim 0620

In addition, each of the Kodams own a Main Regiment (known as Resimen Induk Kodam or Rindam) which is responsible for the training and education of enlisted personnel and non-commissioned officers in their territory.

The office of the Regional Commander is assisted by the following territorial departments:

- Office of the Regional Inspectorate General (Inspektorat Jenderal)
- Office of the Regional Secretariat (Sekretariat Umum)
- Regional Military Police Command (Polisi Militer) – responsible for military law enforcement in the territory
- Regional Public Affairs and Press Office (Penerangan) – responsible for public affairs, media and civil-military relations
- Office of the Regional Adjutant General (Ajudan Jenderal)
- Regional Military Physical Fitness and Sports Office (Jasmani Militer) – responsible for physical fitness and sports affairs
- Regional Medical Department (Kesehatan Militer) – responsible for medical affairs
- Regional Veterans and National Reserves Administration (Badan Pembinaan Administrasi Veteran dan Cadangan) – responsible for military reserves formation and veterans' affairs
- Regional Topography Service (Topografi)
- Regional Chaplaincy Corps (Pembinaan Mental) – chaplaincy service for personnel who are Muslims, Christians, Hindus, Buddhists and Confucianists
- Regional Finance Office (Keuangan) – responsible for financial activities
- Regional Legal Affairs Office (Hukum Militer)
- Regional HQ and HQ Services Detachment (Detasemen Markas)
- Regional C3 Unit (Pusat Komando Pengendalian dan Operasi)
- Regional Information and Communications Technology Office (Informasi dan Pengolahan Data)
- Regional Logistics and Transportation Division (Pembekalan Angkutan)
- Regional Signals Division (Komunikasi dan Elektronika)
- Regional Ordnance Department (Peralatan)
- Regional Engineering Division (Zeni)
- Regional Cyber Operations Service (Sandi dan Siber)
- Regional Intelligence Command (Detasemen Intelijen)
- Liaison offices of the Navy and Air Force formations in each Military Region

Operationally, each "Kodam" is organized as a territorial infantry division which oversees several Subordinate combat units:

- Infantry Brigade
- Territorial Development Infantry Brigade
- directly reporting independent Infantry battalions (including Raider Infantry)
- independent Infantry battalions which are under the Military Subarea Command or "Korem"
- Cavalry Squadron and/or Cavalry Reconnaissance Troop (Separate)
- Field Artillery Battalion/s
- Air Defense Artillery Battalions/Detachments
- Combat Engineers Battalion/s
- Construction Engineers Battalions/Detachments

== Military regions ==
The following is a list of Military Regional Commands in Indonesia:

No	Name	Coat of arms	Namesake	Defence area	Headquarters	Commander	Official website
1.	I Military Regional Command/Bukit Barisan		Bukit Barisan Mountains	North Sumatra	Medan	Major General Hendi Antariksa	kodam1-bukitbarisan.mil.id
2.	II Military Regional Command/Sriwijaya		Srivijaya Empire	South Sumatra	Palembang	Major General Ujang Darwis	kodam-ii-sriwijaya.mil.id
2.	II Military Regional Command/Sriwijaya		Srivijaya Empire	Bangka Belitung	Palembang	Major General Ujang Darwis	kodam-ii-sriwijaya.mil.id
3.	III Military Regional Command/Siliwangi		Prabu Siliwangi	Banten (excluding Tangerang Regency, Tangerang, South Tangerang)	Bandung	Major General Kosasih	siliwangi.mil.id
3.	III Military Regional Command/Siliwangi		Prabu Siliwangi	West Java (excluding Bekasi Regency, Bekasi, Depok)	Bandung	Major General Kosasih	siliwangi.mil.id
4.	IV Military Regional Command/Diponegoro		Prince Diponegoro	Central Java (excluding Klaten Regency, Purworejo Regency, Temanggung Regency, Wonogiri Regency, Wonosobo Regency)	Semarang	Major General Sudaryanto	kodam4.mil.id
5.	V Military Regional Command/Brawijaya		Prabu Brawijaya	East Java	Surabaya	Major General Piek Budyakto	kodam5brawijaya.tniad.mil.id
6.	VI Military Regional Command/Mulawarman		King Mulavarman	East Kalimantan	Balikpapan	Major General Krido Pramono	
6.	VI Military Regional Command/Mulawarman		King Mulavarman	North Kalimantan	Balikpapan	Major General Krido Pramono	
7.	IX Military Regional Command/Udayana		King Udayana Warmadewa	Bali	Denpasar	Major General Putra Widiastawa	
8.	XII Military Regional Command/Tanjungpura		Tanjungpura Kingdom	West Kalimantan	Kubu Raya	Major General Novi Rubadi Sugito	
9.	XIII Military Regional Command/Merdeka		Operation Merdeka (1958)	North Sulawesi	Manado	Major General Anggit Exton Yustiawan	
9.	XIII Military Regional Command/Merdeka		Operation Merdeka (1958)	Gorontalo	Manado	Major General Anggit Exton Yustiawan	
10.	XIV Military Regional Command/Hasanuddin		Sultan Hasanuddin	South Sulawesi	Makassar	Major General Bangun Nawoko	kodam14hasanuddin-tniad.mil.id
10.	XIV Military Regional Command/Hasanuddin		Sultan Hasanuddin	Southeast Sulawesi	Makassar	Major General Bangun Nawoko	kodam14hasanuddin-tniad.mil.id
11.	XV Military Regional Command/Pattimura		Kapitan Pattimura	Maluku	Ambon	Major General Dody Triwinarto	kodam16pattimura.mil.id
12.	XVII Military Regional Command/Cenderawasih		Bird-of-paradise	Papua	Jayapura	Major General Febriel Buyung Sikumbang	
12.	XVII Military Regional Command/Cenderawasih		Bird-of-paradise	Highland Papua	Jayapura	Major General Febriel Buyung Sikumbang	
13.	XVIII Military Regional Command/Kasuari		Bird of Cassowary and PVK	Southwest Papua	Manokwari	Major General Christian Kurnianto Tuhuteru	
13.	XVIII Military Regional Command/Kasuari		Bird of Cassowary and PVK	West Papua	Manokwari	Major General Christian Kurnianto Tuhuteru	
14.	XIX Military Regional Command/Tuanku Tambusai		Tuanku Tambusai	Riau	Pekanbaru	Major General Agus Hadi Waluyo	
15.	XX Military Regional Command/Tuanku Imam Bonjol		Tuanku Imam Bonjol	West Sumatra	Padang	Major General Arief Gajah Mada	
15.	XX Military Regional Command/Tuanku Imam Bonjol		Tuanku Imam Bonjol	Jambi	Padang	Major General Arief Gajah Mada	
16.	XXI Military Regional Command/Radin Inten		Radin Inten II	Lampung	Bandar Lampung	Major General Kristomei Sianturi	
16.	XXI Military Regional Command/Radin Inten		Radin Inten II	Bengkulu	Bandar Lampung	Major General Kristomei Sianturi	
17.	XXII Military Regional Command/Tambun Bungai		Tambun Bungai	Central Kalimantan	Palangka Raya	Major General Zainul Arifin	
17.	XXII Military Regional Command/Tambun Bungai		Tambun Bungai	South Kalimantan	Palangka Raya	Major General Zainul Arifin	
18.	XXIII Military Regional Command/Palaka Wira		Combination of the Sanskrit words Palaka (Warriors) and Wira (Brave)	Central Sulawesi	Palu	Major General Jonathan Binsar Parluhutan Sianipar	
18.	XXIII Military Regional Command/Palaka Wira		Combination of the Sanskrit words Palaka (Warriors) and Wira (Brave)	West Sulawesi	Palu	Major General Jonathan Binsar Parluhutan Sianipar	
19.	XXIV Military Regional Command/Mandala Trikora		Operation Trikora (1962)	South Papua	Merauke	Major General Frits Willem Rizard Pelamonia	
20.	XXV Military Regional Command/Sultan Mahmud Riayat Syah		Mahmud Shah III of Johor	Riau Islands	Batam	Major General Rionardo	
21.	XXVI Military Regional Command/Mataram		Mataram kingdom and Mataram Sultanate	Special Region of Yogyakarta	Sleman	Major General Drajad Brima Yoga	
21.	XXVI Military Regional Command/Mataram		Mataram kingdom and Mataram Sultanate	Central Java (Klaten Regency, Purworejo Regency, Temanggung Regency, Wonogiri Regency, Wonosobo Regency)	Sleman	Major General Drajad Brima Yoga	
22.	XXVII Military Regional Command/Sobe Sonbai		Sobe Sonbai III	East Nusa Tenggara	Kupang	Major General Thevi Angandowa Zebua	
23.	XXVIII Military Regional Command/Moloku Kie Raha		The Four Kingdoms of Maluku (Ternate, Tidore, Jailolo, Bacan)	North Maluku	Sofifi	Major General Nefra Firdaus	
24.	XXIX Military Regional Command/Mambruk		Crowned pigeon (known as mambruk)	Central Papua	Nabire	Major General Aminton Manurung	
25.	XXX Military Regional Command/Rinambora		Mount Rinjani and Mount Tambora	West Nusa Tenggara	Central Lombok	Major General Edi Saputra	
26.	Jaya Military Regional Command/Jayakarta		City of Jayakarta (1527–1619)	Jakarta	Jakarta	Lieutenant General Deddy Suryadi	kodamjaya-tniad.mil.id
26.	Jaya Military Regional Command/Jayakarta		City of Jayakarta (1527–1619)	Banten (Tangerang Regency, Tangerang, South Tangerang)	Jakarta	Lieutenant General Deddy Suryadi	kodamjaya-tniad.mil.id
26.	Jaya Military Regional Command/Jayakarta		City of Jayakarta (1527–1619)	West Java (Bekasi Regency, Bekasi, Depok)	Jakarta	Lieutenant General Deddy Suryadi	kodamjaya-tniad.mil.id
27.	Military Regional Command/Iskandar Muda		Sultan Iskandar Muda	Aceh	Banda Aceh	Major General Mahesa Fitriadi	kodamim-tniad.mil.id

== Planned military regions ==
No.	Name	Regional	Headquarters Candidate	Reference
1.	X Military Regional Command/Lambung Mangkurat	South Kalimantan	Banjarbaru	
2.	Military Regional Command/Halu Oleo	Southeast Sulawesi	Kendari	
3.	Military Regional Command/Tomepayung	West Sulawesi	Mamuju	
4.	Military Regional Command/Maulana Yusuf	Banten	Serang	
