= Kodam XIII/Merdeka =

XIII Regional Military Command/ Merdeka
- Komando Daerah Militer XIII/Merdeka
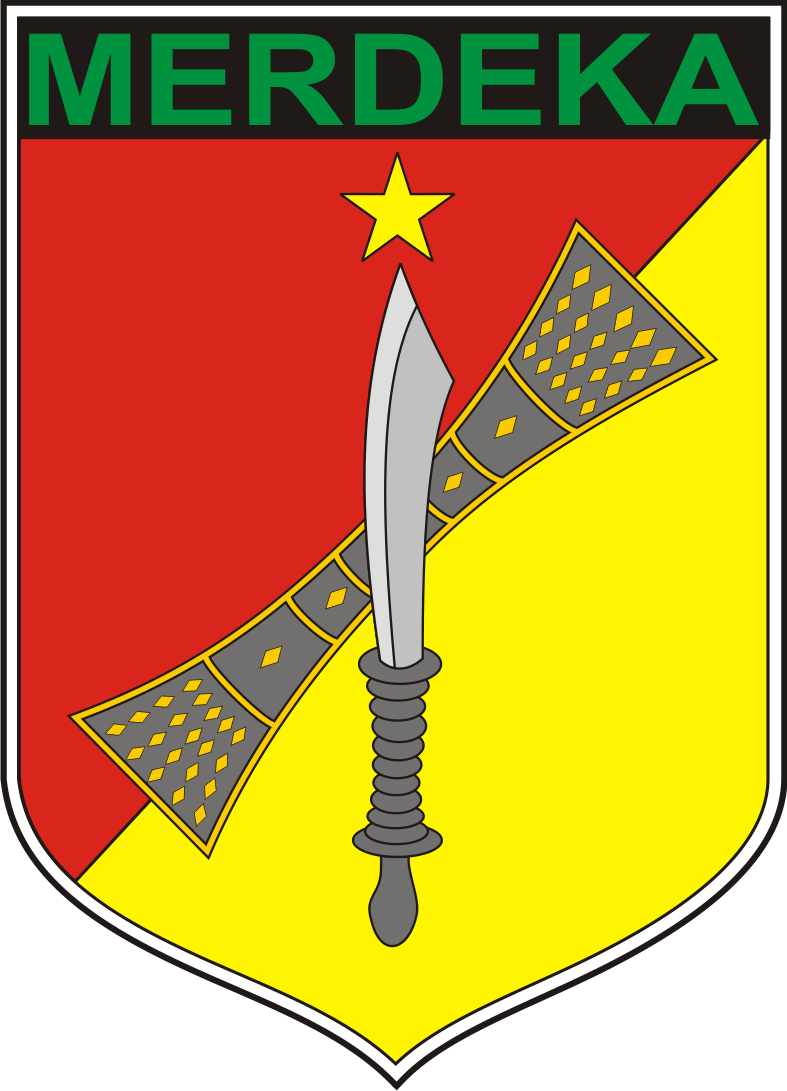
- Coat of arms, and shoulder patch worn by of Kodam XIII/Merdeka personnels
- Active: 16 June 1958 – 3 May 1985; 20 December 2016 – present
- Country: Indonesia
- Branch: Indonesian National Armed Forces
- Type: Indonesia Regional Military Command
- Part of: Indonesian Army
- Garrison/HQ: Manado, North Sulawesi
- Mottos: Jaya Sakti "Victorious and powerful"
- Website: www.kodamxiiimerdeka.com

Commanders
- Commander: Maj. Gen. Agus Mirza

Komando Daerah Militer XIII / Merdeka (XIII Regional Military Command/Merdeka) is a Defense Regional Military Command which is responsible for the defense of the provinces of North Sulawesi and Gorontalo.

== History ==
For many years since independence and the merger of the State of East Indonesia in 1950 to become part of the Republic, the region around the island of Sulawesi became a battleground for interests between Jakarta and the peoples of the island in the 1950s, which would worsen into the full blown Permesta rebellion in 1957. To solve the security problem in the northern half, Decree of the Chief of Staff of the Army KPTS-288/5/1957 on May 27, 1957, was enacted by then Brigadier General Abdul Haris Nasution which formed the North and Central Sulawesi Regional Military Command (Komando Daerah Militer Sulawesi Utara dan Tengah or KDM-SUT) with the 24th Infantry Regiment of the 7th Territorial Army as the basis of this region.

On September 28, 1957, another decree from the office of the Chief of Staff of the Army designated Lt. Col. Inf. Daniel Julius Somba as Commandant of the KDM-SUT, and Major Inf Dolf Runturambi as Chief of Staff.

On June 16, 1958, the Armed Forces executed the landing operation codenamed Operation Independence (Operasi Merdeka) on the Kema Minahasa Coast with the landing forces of around 4,000 servicemen of the Army being led by Lt. Col. (INF) Roekmito Hendraningrat. On 26 June 1958 the city of Manado was captured. On 21 July 1958 Tondano fell followed the fall of Tomohon, the powerhouse of Permesta at that time, on August 16, 1958, due to the betrayal of Major Mongdong of the rebel forces. The campaign against the Permesta rebellion would last two years, ending with the surrender of all rebel soldiers in 1960–61.

On February 12, 1985, Army Chief of Staff General TNI Rudini issued a decree Number: SKEP / 131/11/1985 concerning the merger of both Kodam XIII/Merdeka and Kodam XIV/Hasanuddin to form one super region. As a result, on 1 May 1985, after the Kodam was dissolved to officially form part of Kodam VII / Wirabuana in Ujung Pandang effective 3 May 1985, on the basis of the region, the 131st Military Area Command Santiago (Kodam 131/Santiago) was formed with HQ in Manado, North Sulawesi.

On December 20, 2016, Chief of Staff of the Army General TNI Mulyono was present in Manado, North Sulawesi for the ceremony for the formal reactivation of the military region, this time still carrying the name Kodam XIII/Merdeka. He personally gave the region its new command colour that day. In honor of the landings in Kema Minahasa, the Command Day is held annually every 16 June.

== Territorial Unit ==
- 131st Military Area Command/Santiago with HQ in Manado

- 1301st Military District Command
- 1302nd Military District Command
- 1303rd Military District Command
- 1309th Military District Command
- 1310th Military District Command
- 1312nd Military District Command

- 133rd Military Area Command/Nani Wartabone with HQ in Pulubala

- 1304th Military District Command
- 1313rd Military District Command
- 1314th Military District Command
- 1315th Military District Command
- 713rd Infantry Battalion

== Combat / Combat Support Units ==
- 22nd Infantry Brigade/ Ota Manasa
  - Brigade HQ
  - 711st Infantry Battalion / Raksatama
  - 715th Raider Infantry Battalion / Motuliato
- 712nd Raider Infantry Battalion / Wiratama
- 19th field Artillery Battalion / Bogani
- 19th Combat Engineer Battalion / Yudha Karya Nyata
- 15th Combat Engineer Detachment / Siwagi Lemba Maroso
- 10th Cavalry Troop / Manguni Setia Cakti
- Divisional Air Defence Artillery Detachment
- Cavalry Detachment

== Training units ==
Training units in Kodam XIII/Merdeka are organized under 13rd Merdeka Regional Training Regiment (Resimen Induk Kodam Kodam XIII/Merdeka (Rindam Kodam XIII/Merdeka)). The units are:

- Regiment HQ
- Satuan Dodik Latpur (Combat Training Command Unit)
- Satuan Dodik Kejuruan (Specialized Training Command Unit)
- Sekolah Calon Bintara (Non-Commissioned Officer Training School)
- Sekolah Calon Tamtama (Enlisted Training School)
- Satuan Dodik Bela Negara (National Defence Training Command Unit)

== Support units ==
- Kodam XIII/Merdeka Military Police Command (Pomdam XIII/Merdeka)
- Kodam XIII/Merdeka Public Relations Office (Pendam XIII/Merdeka)
- Kodam XIII/Merdeka Adjutant General's Office (Anjendam XIII/Merdeka)
- Kodam XIII/Merdeka Military Physical Fitness and Sports Bureau (Jasdam XIII/Merdeka)
- Kodam XIII/Merdeka Medical Department (Kesdam XIII/Merdeka)
- Kodam XIII/Merdeka Veterans and National Reserves Administration (Babiminvetcadam XIII/Merdeka)
- Kodam XIII/Merdeka Topography Service (Topdam XIII/Merdeka)
- Kodam XIII/Merdeka Chaplaincy Corps (Bintaldam XIII/Merdeka)
- Kodam XIII/Merdeka Finance Office (Kudam XIII/Merdeka)
- Kodam XIII/Merdeka Legal Affairs (Kumdam XIII/Merdeka)
- Kodam XIII/Merdeka HQ and HQ Services Detachment (Denmadam XIII/Merdeka)
- Kodam XIII/Merdeka Information and Communications Technology Oiffice (Infolahtadam XIII/Merdeka)
- Kodam XIII/Merdeka Supply Corps (Bekangdam XIII/Merdeka)
- Kodam XIII/Merdeka Transportation Corps (Hubdam XIII/Merdeka)
- Kodam XIII/Merdeka Ordnance Corps (Paldam XIII/Merdeka)
- Kodam XIII/Merdeka Engineers Command (Zidam XIII/Merdeka)
- Kodam XIII/Merdeka Signals Unit (Sandidam XIII/Merdeka)
- Kodam XIII/Merdeka Intelligence Detachment (Deninteldam XIII/Merdeka)
