= Kostrad 3rd Infantry Division =

3rd Infantry Division (Kostrad)
- Divisi Infanteri 3 Kostrad
- Active: 11 May 2018
- Country: Indonesia
- Branch: Indonesian Army
- Type: Combined arms
- Role: Strategic defense operations
- Part of: Kostrad
- Garrison/HQ: Bontomarannu, Gowa, South Sulawesi
- Mottos: Sanskrit: Darpa Cakti Yudha ("Bold and graced at battlefield")
- Beret color: Green
- Anniversaries: 11 May

Commanders
- Commander: Maj.Gen. Wulang Nur Yudhanto
- Chief of staff: Brig.Gen. Fadli Mulyono
- Inspector: Brig.Jen.

The 3rd Kostrad Infantry Division (Indonesian: Divisi Infanteri 3 Kostrad) abbreviated "Divif 3/Kostrad", is an army strategic command division of the Indonesian Army. The divisional commander is a two-star Major General. The division's headquarters are in Gowa (South Sulawesi). It is the newest of all the infantry divisions of the Kostrad.

The 3rd Airborne Brigade (Raider) is one of its oldest components, founded on 7 February 1962, but was incorporated into the Division in 2018 after being in the Kopassus and the 1st Kostrad Infantry Division.

== Organization ==
The division's composition are:

- 3rd Infantry Division HQ command
  - 3rd Airborne Brigade (Raider)
    - 431st Parachute Infantry Battalion (Raider)
    - 432nd Parachute Infantry Battalion (Raider)
    - 433rd Parachute Infantry Battalion (Raider)
  - 20th Infantry Brigade (Raider)
    - 753th Infantry Battalion (Raider)
    - 754th Infantry Battalion (Raider)
    - 756th Infantry Battalion (Raider)
  - 6th Field Artillery Battalion
  - 16th Medium Air-Defence Artillery Battalion
  - Division Combat Engineers Battalion (under formation)
  - Division Supply and Transportation Battalion (under formation)
  - Division Medical Battalion (under formation)
  - 14th Cavalry Company
  - 3rd Infantry Division Signal Detachment
  - 3rd Infantry Division Ordnance Detachment
  - 3rd Infantry Division Military Police Detachment
  - 3rd Infantry Division Adjutant General's Detachment

== See also ==
- 1st Kostrad Infantry Division
- 2nd Kostrad Infantry Division
