= Kodam XVIII/Kasuari =

XVIII Military Regional Command/Cassowary
- Komando Daerah Militer XVIII/Kasuari
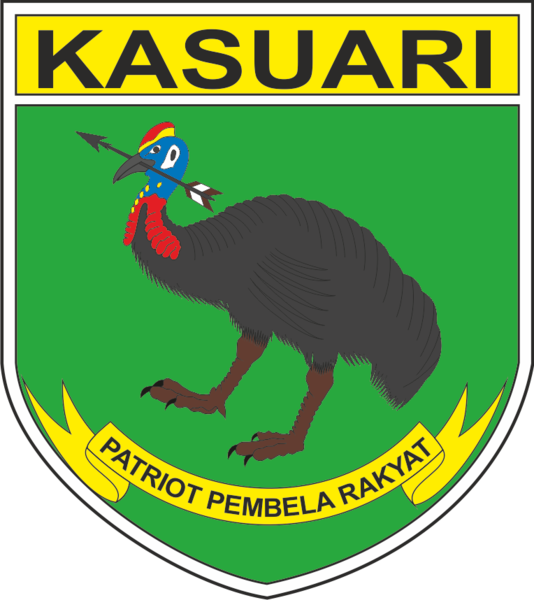
- XVIII Military Regional Command/Cassowary Symbol
- Active: December 19, 2016 - present
- Country: Indonesia
- Branch: Indonesian National Armed Forces Tentara Nasional Indonesia (Indonesian)
- Type: Indonesia Regional Military Command
- Part of: Indonesian Army
- Garrison/HQ: Manokwari, West Papua
- Mottos: Patriot Pembela Rakyat "Patriot Defender of the People"
- Mascot: Cassowary
- Website: kasuari18-tniad.mil.id

Commanders
- Commander: Maj. Gen Ilyas Alamsyah Harahap (id)
- Chief of Staff: Brig. Gen. Yusuf Ragainaga

Komando Daerah Militer XVIII/Kasuari (XVIII Military Region Command/Cassowary) (often abbreviated "Kodam XVIII / Cassowary"), is the Defense Regional Command in Southwest Papua, and West Papua Province, which was created in 2016 with the division of parts of Kodam XVII/Cenderawasih which is located in Jayapura, Papua Province.

== History ==
The vastness of the area and security disturbances against pro-independence forces in the 2010s made the Indonesian National Armed Forces express the need to form a new regional command in Manokwari, covering northern parts of West Papua. In 2016, the Indonesian Army, through then Chief of Staff General Mulyono, decided to create a brand new military region separated from Kodam XVII/Cenderawasih, and on December 16, Kodam XVIII/Kasuari, was officially raised as the youngest Regional Military Command of the Army.

It was named after the Cassowary bird native to the province of West Papua, it was also because its units were formerly formed from combination of infiltration forces of Operation Trikora, guerrilla forces of Cassowary Battalion of Arfai, and former members of PVK, after they had been trained in Siliwangi and Diponegoro.

Its Command Building is headquartered in Arfai Village, South Manokwari District, Manokwari, West Papua. The construction of the Kasuari Kodam headquarters was on 24.7 hectares of land, which previously belonged to the C Rifle Company. The land was owned by the Indonesian Army, the headquarters of the C and D Rifle Companies, and today the composite Company's barracks are now relocated to Warmare District.

The founding commander of the region was Major General TNI Joppye Onesimus Wayangkau (id), assisted by his chief of staff, Brigadier General TNI Ferry Zein (id).

== Organization ==
=== Territorial unit ===
In 2020-21, the territorial organization of Kodam XVIII/Kasuari was split into two MACs and one Military District (Separate).

- 181st Military Area Command/Praja Vira Tama with HQ in Sorong

- 1802nd Military District Command
- 1805th Military District Command
- 1807th Military District Command
- 1809th Military District Command
- 1810th Military District Command

- 182nd Military Area Command/Jazira Onim with HQ in Fakfak

- 1803rd Military District Command
- 1804th Military District Command
- 1806th Military District Command
- 1808th Military District Command

- 1801st Military District Command/Self Supporting, based in Manokwari

=== Combat and combat support ===
- 26th Infantry Brigade/Gurana Piarawaimo

- Brigade HQ
- 762nd Raider Infantry Battalion
- 763rd Infantry Battalion
- 764th Infantry Battalion

- 761st Infantry Battalion/Kibibor Akinting
- 20th Combat Engineers Battalion/Pawbili Pelle Alang

=== Training regiment ===
- 17th Regional Training Regiment

* Secata Rindam XVIII / Cassowary
* Secaba Rindam XVIII / Cassowary
* Dodiklatpur Rindam XVIII / Cassowary
* Dodikjur Rindam XVIII / Cassowary
* Dodik Bela Negara Rindam XVIII / Cassowary
