= Kodam Iskandar Muda =

Iskandar Muda Military Region Command
- Komando Daerah Militer Iskandar Muda (KODAM IM)
- Coat of arms
- Active: 22 December 1956–present
- Country: Indonesia
- Branch: Indonesian National Armed Forces (Indonesian: Tentara Nasional Indonesia)
- Type: Indonesia Regional Military Command
- Size: 1 Division
- Part of: Indonesian Army
- Garrison/HQ: Banda Aceh
- Mottos: Sanggamara ("Ward off the havoc")
- Mascot: War elephant

Commanders
- Commander: Maj. Gen. Mahesa Fitriadi

Iskandar Muda Military Region Command (Indonesian: Komando Daerah Militer Iskandar Muda/Kodam Iskandar Muda) is a military territorial command (military district) of the Indonesian Army. It has been in active service as the local division for Aceh Province (from 1956–1985 and from 2002 to present). Its emblem is a white elephant, after the war elephants that served in the namesake's army during his rule as Sultan of Aceh.

== Military Territorial units ==
The region is composed of 2 Military Area Commands, 1 Training Regiment and 1 Independent Military District.

- 0101st Military District Command/Self-supporting in Banda Aceh
- 011st Military Area Command/Lilawangsa with HQ in Lhokseumawe

- 0102nd Military District Command
- 0103rd Military District Command
- 0104th Military District Command
- 0106th Military District Command
- 0108th Military District Command
- 0111st Military District Command
- 0113rd Military District Command
- 0117th Military District Command
- 0119th Military District Command

- 012nd Military Area Command/Teuku Umar with HQ in Meulaboh

- 0105th Military District Command
- 0107th Military District Command
- 0109th Military District Command
- 0110th Military District Command
- 0112nd Military District Command
- 0114th Military District Command
- 0115th Military District Command
- 0116th Military District Command
- 0118th Military District Command
- 115th Raider Infantry Battalion
- 116th Infantry Battalion
- 117th Infantry Battalion

== Support formations ==
- RMC Iskandar Muda Military Police Command (Pomdam IM)
- RMC Iskandar Muda Public Affairs Bureau (Pendam IM)
- RMC Iskandar Muda Adjutant General's Office (Anjendam IM)
- RMC Iskandar Muda Military Physical Fitness and Sports Bureau (Jasdam IM)
- RMC Iskandar Muda Medical Department (Kesdam IM)
- RMC Iskandar Muda Veterans and National Reserves Administration (Babiminvetcadam IM)
- RMC Iskandar Muda Topography Service (Topdam IM)
- RMC Iskandar Muda Chaplaincy Corps (Bintaldam IM)
- RMC Iskandar Muda Finance Office (Kudam IM)
- RMC Iskandar Muda Legal Affairs Office (Kumdam IM)
- RMC Iskandar Muda HQ and HQ Services Detachment (Denmadam IM)
- RMC Iskandar Muda Information and Communications Technology Oiffice (Infolahtadam IM)
- RMC Iskandar Muda Logistics and Transportation Division (Bekangdam IM)
- RMC Iskandar Muda Signals Division (Hubdam IM)
- RMC Iskandar Muda Ordnance Corps (Paldam IM)
- RMC Iskandar Muda Engineering Division (Zidam IM)
- RMC Iskandar Muda Cyber Operations Unit (Sandidam IM)
- RMC Iskandar Muda Intelligence Command (Deninteldam IM)

== Training Units ==
Training units in Kodam Iskandar Muda are organized under the Iskandar Muda Regional Training Regiment (Rindam Iskandar Muda). The units are as follows:

- Regiment HQ
- NCO School
- Basic Combat Training Center
- National Defense Training Command
- Specialist Training School
- Enlisted Personnel Training Unit

== Combat and Combat Support units ==
- 25th Raider Infantry Brigade (Special Operations)/Siwah
  - Brigade HQ
  - 111th Raider Battalion
  - 113th Mechanized Raider Infantry Battalion
  - 114th Raider Infantry Battalion
- 890th Territorial Development Infantry Brigade//Yudha Giri Dhanu
  - Brigade HHC
- 112th Raider Infantry Battalion/Dharma Jaya
- 11th Armored Cavalry Battalion/Serbu Macan Setia Cakti
- 11th Armored Cavalry Troop
- 17th Field Artillery Battalion/Rencong Cakti
- 16th Combat Engineers Battalion/Dhika Anoraga
- 1st Air Defense Missile Artillery Divisional Detachment/Cigra Satria Bhuana Yudha
