= Kodam XVII/Cenderawasih =

Military area command of the Indonesian Army

XVII Military Regional Command/Cenderawasih
- Komando Daerah Militer XVII/Cenderawasih
- Coat of Arms and patch worn by Kodam XVII/Cenderawasih personnel.
- Active: 17 May 1963 – present
- Country: Indonesia
- Branch: Indonesian National Armed Forces Tentara Nasional Indonesia (Indonesian)
- Type: Indonesia Regional Military Command
- Part of: Indonesian Army
- Garrison/HQ: Jayapura
- Mottos: Ksatria Pelindung Rakyat "Knight protectors of the people"
- Mascot: bird-of-paradise
- Website: kodam17cenderawasih-tniad.mil.id

Commanders
- Commander: Maj.Gen. Buyung Febri Sikumbang

Insignia
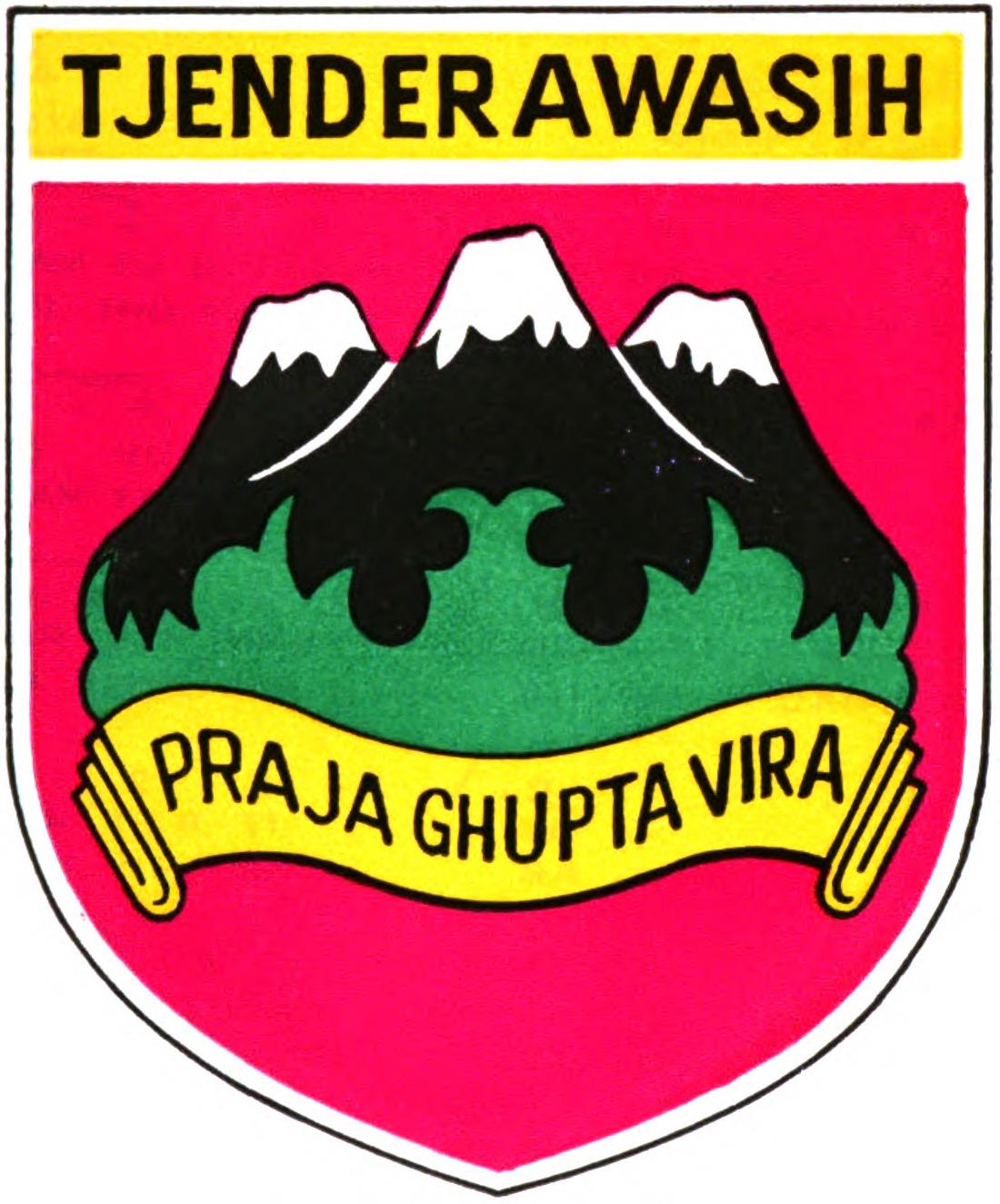
- Old Coat of Arms

Komando Daerah Militer XVII/Cenderawasih or Kodam XVII/Cenderawasih (XVII Military Regional Command/Cenderawasih), is a military area command of the Indonesian Army, as the 17th (Roman numeral "XVII") Kodam, which is responsible for the defense of the provinces of Papua, Central Papua and Highland Papua.

== Brief history ==
The military region was established on 8 August 1962 after Operation Trikora in which the Indonesian National Armed Forces took part in the invasion of the West Papua, in then Netherlands New Guinea. Major General Rukman was appointed its first commanding general, and the command was responsible for the Indonesian Contingent Western Papua (Kontingen Indonesia Irian Barat (KOTINDO)), the Indonesian infiltration units that were deployed to the region during Operation Trikora. It included Detachment A based in Merauke, Detachment B based in Kaimana, Detachment C based in Fakfak, and Detachment D based in Sorong. Kotindo was part of the United Nations Security Force (UNSF) which was the security force of the United Nations Temporary Executive Authority following the September 1962 New York Agreement.

Its Command Day is marked every 17 May marking the 1963 formal handover of West Papua to the Republic of Indonesia. In the same year, Ahmad Yani executed Operation Wishnumurti, to send divisions from Java, Makassar, and Moluccas, to supplement Kotindo forces. The formation of Kodam XVII/Irian Barat was on 17 August 1962, although it did not have any units assigned. On 30 June 1964, the name was changed to Kodam XVII/Tjendrawasih. It was further expanded with more battalions, which includes Battalion 751/Tjendrawasih in Manokwari which was formed from Kodam VII/Diponegoro, Yonif 752/Tjendrawasih in Sorong from Kodam VI/Siliwangi, and Yonif 753/Tjendrawasih in Jayapura. These three units were reorganisation from Yonif 641/Tjendrawasih I from Diponegoro and Yonif 642/Tjendrawasih II from Siliwangi which also integrated infiltration forces of Trikora, guerrilla forces of Cassowary Battalion of Arfai, and former members of PVK after they had been trained in Siliwangi and Diponegoro.

Previously Irian Jaya and the Maluku islands were under Kodam VIII/Trikora, formed in 1984. Kodam VIII/Trikora had in 1997 six infantry battalions plus engineer detachments. The district commands in 1997 included Korem 171 (HQ Manokwari), Korem 172 (HQ Abepura), Korem 173 (HQ Biak), and Korem 174 (HQ Ambon). The South Pacific Yearbook reported three infantry battalions which were based at Manokwari, Jayapura, and Sorong, as well as mentioning a naval base at Biak. The military command derives its name (Cenderawasih) from the Indonesian word for the bird-of-paradise, which is native to Papua.

On June 8, 2012, the Indonesian Police told AFP that one person was killed and 17 wounded when Indonesian soldiers opened fire on civilians after a deadly dispute sparked by a road accident in Papua province. The shootings took place late on June 7, 2012, after residents, angry that two soldiers on a motorcycle hit and injured a child, stabbed one of the troops to death and seriously injured the other in Wamena: "Following the road accident soldiers... arrived in two trucks and took revenge by firing gunshots toward residents and setting several houses on fire," national police spokesman Saud Usman Nasution said. "The trouble then spread to the city centre where several shops and houses were also damaged by gunshots," he told AFP.

== Territorial units ==
The Territorial Units in Kodam XVII/Cenderawasih, since 2026, are organized into a singular Military Area Command (Korem) and one Military District (Kodim BS):

- *1701st Military District Command with HQ in Jayapura
- 172nd Military Area Command/Praja Wira Yakthi with HQ in Wamena

- 1702nd Military District Command
- 1703rd Military District Command
- 1706th Military District Command
- 1715th Military District Command
- 1716th Military District Command

== Combat/combat-support units ==
- 751st Special Raider Infantry Battalion/Vira Jaya Sakti
- 3rd Cavalry Detachment (Independent)/Srigala Ceta
- 10th Engineers Detachment/Ksatria Yudha Dharma
- 12th Engineers Detachment/Ohar'o Hesowa Hubana

== Training units ==
- 17th Regional Training Regiment (Resimen Induk Kodam XVII/Cenderawasih)
  - Regiment HQ
  - Satuan Dodik Latpur (Combat Training Command Unit)
  - Satuan Dodik Kejuruan (Specialist Training Command Unit)
  - Sekolah Calon Bintara (Non-Commissioned Officer Training School)
  - Sekolah Calon Tamtama (Enlisted Training School)
  - Satuan Dodik Bela Negara (National Defence Training Command Unit)

== Support units ==
The other support units are:

- Military Police Command(Pomdam XVII/Cenderawasih)
- Public Relations (Pendam XVII/Cenderawasih)
- Adjutant General's Bureau (Anjendam XVII/Cenderawasih)
- Military Physical Fitness and Sports (Jasdam XVII/Cenderawasih)
- Medical Department (Kesdam XVII/Cenderawasih)
- Veterans and Reserves Administration (Babiminvetcadam XVII/Cenderawasih)
- Topograph (Topdam XVII/Cenderawasih)
- Chaplaincy Corps (Bintaldam XVII/Cenderawasih)
- Treasury (Kudam XVII/Cenderawasih)
- Legal Affairs (Kumdam XVII/Cenderawasih)
- HQ Detachment (Detasemen XVII/Cenderawasih)
- Information and Data Center(Infolahtadam XVII/Cenderawasih)
- Supply (Bekangdam XVII/Cenderawasih)
- Communications (Komlekdam XVII/Cenderawasih)
- Ordnance (Paldam XVII/Cenderawasih)
- Corps of Engineers (Zidam XVII/Cenderawasih)
- Signals (Sandidam XVII/Cenderawasih)
- Intelligence Detachment (Deninteldam XVII/Cenderawasih)
