= Kodam XII/Tanjungpura =

XII Military Regional Command/Tanjungpura
- Komando Daerah Militer XII/Tanjungpura
- Coat of arms
- Active: 17 July 1958 – present
- Country: Indonesia
- Branch: Indonesian National Armed Forces
- Type: Indonesia Regional Military Command
- Part of: Indonesian Army
- Garrison/HQ: Kubu Raya Regency
- Mottos: Carathana Jita Vina "Once take a step, never step back nor give up"
- Website: kodamtanjungpura-tniad.mil.id

Commanders
- Commander: Maj.Gen. Novi Rubadi Sugito

Kodam XII/Tanjungpura (XII Military Regional Command/Tanjungpura), is an Indonesian Army Regional Military Command that covers West Kalimantan province. Kodam Tanjungpura also oversees the defense of Indonesian border region with the Malaysian state of Sarawak.

== Brief history ==
The command traces its roots to a decree of the Chief of Staff of the Army dated 2 February 1950 which established the G Brigade of the 1st Military Area Western Kalimantan, which later became the Western Kalimantan Military Region and the 12th Military Region, which was in existence until 1985.

Since 28 June 2010, the former 6th Military Region was divided into two military regions: Kodam VI/Mulawarman responsible for the provinces of East Kalimantan, South Kalimantan, and North Kalimantan and the new Kodam XII/Tanjungpura, responsible for the provinces of West Kalimantan and Central Kalimantan.

== Territorial Units ==
Territorial Units in Kodam XII/Tanjungpura comprise two Military Area Commands (Korem) and a self-supporting Military District Command (Kodim).

- Korem 121/Alambhana Wanawai, consisted of ten MDCs:
  - Kodim 1201/Mempawah
  - Kodim 1202/Singkawang
  - Kodim 1203/Ketapang
  - Kodim 1204/Sanggau
  - Kodim 1205/Sintang
  - Kodim 1206/Putussibau
  - Kodim 1208/Sambas
  - 643rd Mechanized Infantry Btn/Wanara Sakti
- Kodim 1207/Pontianak (self-supporting)

== Combat / Combat Support Units ==
- 19th Infantry Brigade/Khatulistiwa
  - Brigade HQ
  - 642nd Infantry Battalion/Kapuas
  - 644th Special Raider Infantry Battalion/Walet Sakti
  - 645th Infantry Battalion/Gardatama Yudha
- 641st Raider Infantry Battalion/Beruang Hitam
- 12th Assault Cavalry Squadron/Beruang Cakti
- 12th Cavalry Troop (Separate)
- 16th Field Artillery Battalion/Tumbak Kaputing
- 6th Combat Engineers Battalion/Satya Digdaya
- Air Defense Missile Artillery Detachment

== Training Units ==
Training units in Kodam Tanjungpura are organised under Kodam XII/Tanjungpura Regional Training Regiment/Resimen Induk Kodam XII/Tanjungpura(Rindam XII/Tanjungpura), the units are:

- Regimental HQ
- Satuan Dodik Latpur (Combat Training Command Unit)
- Satuan Dodik Kejuruan (Specialised Training Command Unit)
- Sekolah Calon Bintara (Non-Commissioned Officer Training School)
- Sekolah Calon Tamtama A (Enlisted Training School)
- Sekolah Calon Tamtama B (Enlisted Training School)
- Satuan Dodik Bela Negara (National Defence Training Command Unit)

== Support formations ==
- MRC XII/Tanjungpura Military Police Command (Pomdam XII/Tanjungpura)
- MRC XII/Tanjungpura Public Relations Bureau (Pendam XII/Tanjungpura)
- MRC XII/Tanjungpura Adjutant General's Office (Anjendam XII/Tanjungpura)
- MRC XII/Tanjungpura Military Physical Fitness and Sports Bureau (Jasdam XII/Tanjungpura)
- MRC XII/Tanjungpura Medical Department (Kesdam XII/Tanjungpura)
- MRC XII/Tanjungpura Veterans and National Reserves Administration (Babiminvetcadam XII/Tanjungpura)
- MRC XII/Tanjungpura Topography Service (Topdam XII/Tanjungpura)
- MRC XII/Tanjungpura Chaplaincy Corps (Bintaldam XII/Tanjungpura)
- MRC XII/Tanjungpura Finance Office (Kudam XII/Tanjungpura)
- MRC XII/Tanjungpura Legal Affairs Office (Kumdam XII/Tanjungpura)
- MRC XII/Tanjungpura HQ and HQ Services Detachment (Denmadam XII/Tanjungpura)
- MRC XII/Tanjungpura Information and Communications Technology Oiffice (Infolahtadam XII/Tanjungpura)
- MRC XII/Tanjungpura Supply Corps (Bekangdam XII/Tanjungpura)
- MRC XII/Tanjungpura Electronics Communication Corps (Hubdam XII/Tanjungpura)
- MRC XII/Tanjungpura Ordnance Corps (Paldam XII/Tanjungpura)
- MRC XII/Tanjungpura Engineering Division (Zidam XII/Tanjungpura)
- MRC XII/Tanjungpura Signals Unit (Sandidam XII/Tanjungpura)
- MRC XII/Tanjungpura Intelligence Detachment (Deninteldam XII/Tanjungpura)
