= Kodam XIV/Hasanuddin =

XIV Military Regional Command/Hasanuddin
- Komando Daerah Militer XIV/Hasanuddin
- Coat of Arms and patch worn by Kodam XIV/Hasanuddin personnel.
- Active: 1 June 1957 - present
- Country: Indonesia
- Branch: Indonesian National Armed Forces
- Type: Indonesia Regional Military Command
- Size: One Infantry Brigade plus some other units (approx.1 Division)
- Part of: Indonesian Army
- Garrison/HQ: Makassar, South Sulawesi
- Mottos: Setia Hingga Akhir ("Loyal till the Last")
- Website: www.kodam14hasanuddin-tniad.mil.id

Commanders
- Commander: Maj.Gen. Bangun Nawoko

Komando Daerah Militer XIV/Hasanuddin (XIV Military Regional Command/Hasanuddin) is a military command area (effectively a military district) of the Military of Indonesia. It oversees the following provinces on Sulawesi island: South Sulawesi and Southeast Sulawesi.

Formerly, the command was known as Kodam VII/Wirabuana (formerly also T&T VII/Wirabuana) from 1950 to 1957 and from 1985 until it was renamed in 2017. Given its long history the 14th MDC is the oldest military district in eastern Indonesia. It obtained its current name partly as part of the Indonesian Army response to the Permesta rebellion by select Army officers in 1957, when the 7th Territorial Army was split into several military regions, one of these named after Sultan Hasanuddin of Gowa, a National Hero of Indonesia for his efforts against the Netherlands military conquest of the Sultanate of Gowa.

== Territorial units ==
- 141st Military Area Command/Toddopuli with HQ in Bone Regency

- 1403rd Military District Command
- 1404th Military District Command
- 1405th Military District Command
- 1406th Military District Command
- 1407th Military District Command
- 1409th Military District Command
- 1410th Military District Command
- 1411st Military District Command
- 1414th Military District Command
- 1415th Military District Command
- 1419th Military District Command
- 1420th Military District Command
- 1421st Military District Command
- 1422nd Military District Command
- 1423rd Military District Command
- 1424th Military District Command
- 1425th Military District Command
- 1426th Military District Command

- 143rd Military Area Command/Halu Oleo with HQ in Kendari

- 1412nd Military District Command
- 1413rd Military District Command
- 1416th Military District Command
- 1417th Military District Command
- 1429th Military District Command
- 1430th Military District Command
- 1431st Military District Command
- 725th Infantry Battalion

- 1408th Military District Command (self-supporting) based in Makassar

== Combat and combat support units ==
- 11th Infantry Brigade/Badik Sakti
  - Brigade HQ
  - 721st Infantry Battalion/Makkasau
  - 726rd Infantry Battalion/Tamalatea
- 700th Raider Infantry Battalion/Wira Yudha Cakti
- 10th Assault Armoured Cavalry Squadron/Mendagiri
- 8th Combat Engineers Battalion/Sakti Mandraguna
- 21st Field Artillery Battalion/Kawali
- 4th Air Defense Artillery Battalion/Arakata Akasa Yudha

== Training units ==
Training units in Kodam XIV/Hasanuddin are organized under 14th Hasanuddin Regional Training Regiment (Resimen Induk Kodam Kodam XIV/Hasanuddin (Rindam Kodam XIV/Hasanuddin)). The units are:

- Regiment HQ
- Satuan Dodik Latpur (Combat Training Command Unit)
- Satuan Dodik Kejuruan (Specialized Training Command Unit)
- Sekolah Calon Bintara (Non-Commissioned Officer Training School)
- Sekolah Calon Tamtama (Enlisted Training School)
- Satuan Dodik Bela Negara (National Defence Training Command Unit)

== Support units ==
- Kodam XIV/Hasanuddin Military Police Command (Pomdam XIV/Hasanuddin)
- Kodam XIV/Hasanuddin Public Relations Office (Pendam XIV/Hasanuddin)
- Kodam XIV/Hasanuddin Adjutant General's Office (Ajendam XIV/Hasanuddin)
- Kodam XIV/Hasanuddin Military Physical Fitness and Sports Bureau (Jasdam XIV/Hasanuddin)
- Kodam XIV/Hasanuddin Medical Department (Kesdam XIV/Hasanuddin)
- Kodam XIV/Hasanuddin Veterans and National Reserves Administration (Babiminvetcadam XIV/Hasanuddin)
- Kodam XIV/Hasanuddin Topography Service (Topdam XIV/Hasanuddin)
- Kodam XIV/Hasanuddin Chaplaincy Corps (Bintaldam XIV/Hasanuddin)
- Kodam XIV/Hasanuddin Finance Office (Kudam XIV/Hasanuddin)
- Kodam XIV/Hasanuddin Legal Affairs (Kumdam XIV/Hasanuddin)
- Kodam XIV/Hasanuddin HQ and HQ Services Detachment (Denmadam XIV/Hasanuddin)
- Kodam XIV/Hasanuddin Information and Communications Technology Oiffice (Infolahtadam XIV/Hasanuddin)
- Kodam XIV/Hasanuddin Supply Corps (Bekangdam XIV/Hasanuddin)
- Kodam XIV/Hasanuddin Transportation Corps (Hubdam XIV/Hasanuddin)
- Kodam XIV/Hasanuddin Ordnance Corps (Paldam XIV/Hasanuddin)
- Kodam XIV/Hasanuddin Engineers Command (Zidam XIV/Hasanuddin)
- Kodam XIV/Hasanuddin Signals Unit (Sandidam XIV/Hasanuddin)
- Kodam XIV/Hasanuddin Intelligence Detachment (Deninteldam XIV/Hasanuddin)
