= 21st Army =

21st Army may refer to:

- 21st Group Army, China
- 21st Army (Wehrmacht), Germany
- Twenty-First Army (Japan)
- 21st Army (Soviet Union)
- 21st Army Group, United Kingdom

== See also ==
- List of armies by number
- XXI Corps (disambiguation)
- 21st Division (disambiguation)
- 21st Brigade (disambiguation)
- 21st Regiment (disambiguation)
- 21st Battalion (disambiguation)
- 21st Squadron (disambiguation)
- 21st (disambiguation)
