= 21st =

21st is the ordinal form of the number 21. Twenty-first or 21st may also refer to:

- A fraction, 1/21, equal to one of 21 equal parts
- 21st of the month, a recurring calendar date
- 21st birthday, the age of majority in a several countries

== Geography ==
- 21st meridian east, a line of longitude
- 21st meridian west, a line of longitude
- 21st parallel north, a circle of latitude
- 21st parallel south, a circle of latitude
- 21st Avenue
- 21st Street (disambiguation)

== Military ==
- Twenty-First Air Force
- 21st Army (disambiguation)
- 21st Battalion (disambiguation)
- 21st Division (disambiguation)
- 21st Regiment (disambiguation)
- 21st Squadron (disambiguation)

== Other ==
- Twenty-first Amendment (disambiguation)
  - Twenty-first Amendment to the United States Constitution
- 21st century
- 21st century BC

== See also ==
- 21 (disambiguation)
- 21st Century (disambiguation)
