= Indonesian Army infantry battalions =

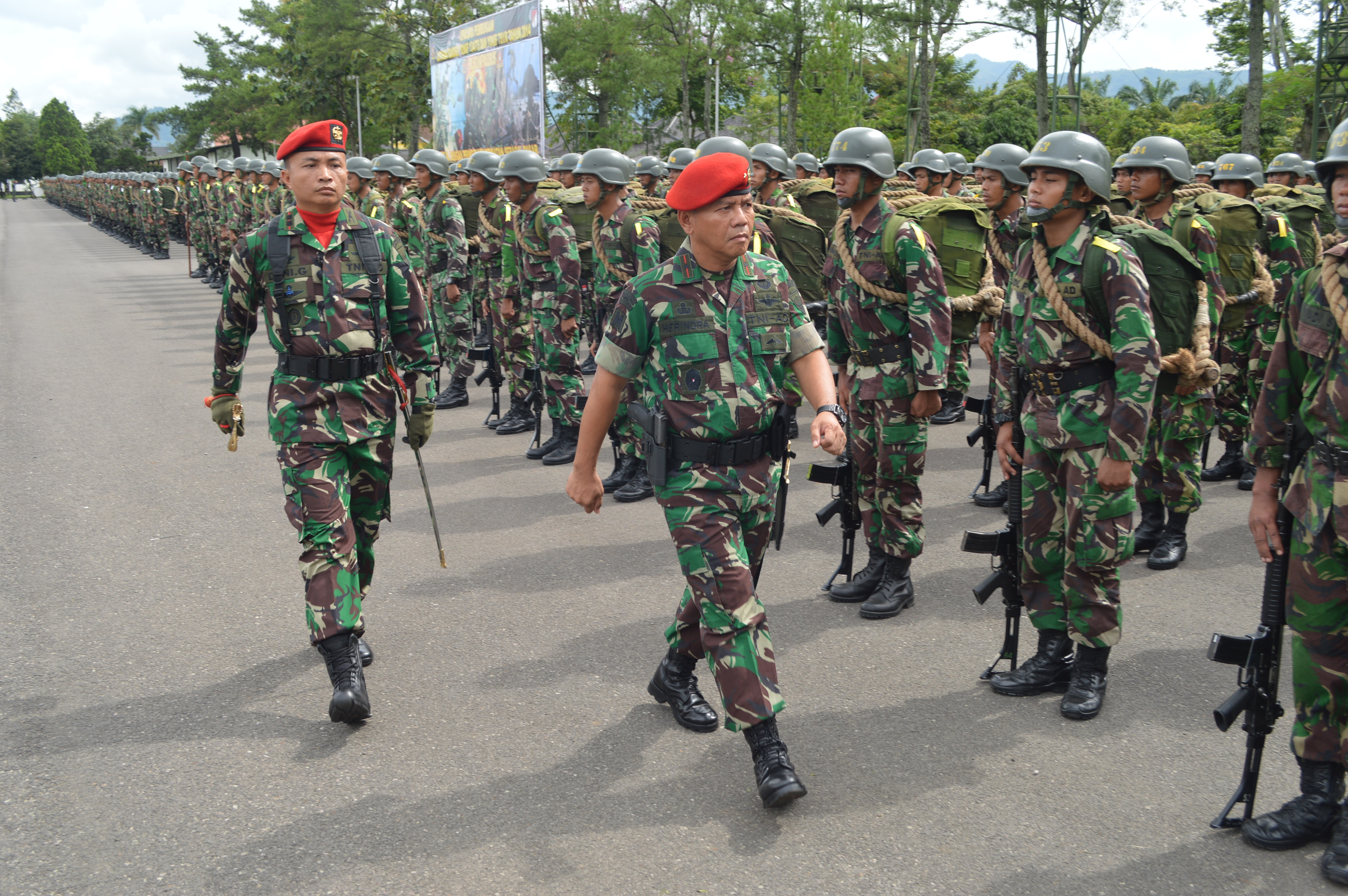
Infantry soldiers from the 134th Infantry Battalion (Yonif 134) being inspected during the opening ceremony for "Raider" specialization training

The Indonesian Army has formed a large number of infantry battalions since it was formed from provisional militias during the Indonesian National Revolution against the Dutch colonial rule, 1945–1949. Indonesian military units are commonly referred to by compound words. Infantry battalions are routinely called as Yonifs which is a portmanteau from "batalyon infanteri" ('infantry battalion'). They are also commonly referred to by their battalion nicknames, for example: 511th Infantry Battalion - "Dibyatama Yudha".

== Organization ==
The Infantry Branch is the principal and major unit of the Indonesian army combat element. The Infantry element is the largest and main combat troops within the Indonesian army. Kostrad and Kopassus are all part of this branch although it also consists of non-infantry units internally. In Indonesia, there are more than 100 Infantry Battalions spread throughout the country. Green berets are worn by Indonesian Army infantrymen. The Infantry Branch of the Indonesian Army are under the auspices of the Infantry Branch Centre ("Pussenif") which is under the command of a Lieutenant general.

The elite infantry battalions of the Indonesian Army are called "Raider Battalions" (raised on 2003) which are specially trained in Raid and Air assault operations (including counter-terrorism, Extraction, Guerrilla and Close combat operations). By strength and capabilities, 1 battalion of Raider infantry is equal to 3 regular infantry battalions combined. There are currently about 49 raider battalions in the Indonesian Army Infantry branch, with the strength of 650 to 800 men per-battalion. It is larger compared to regular infantry battalions which only consists about 450 to 570 infantrymen. Even as the Chief of Staff of the Army (Kasad) is planning in the future to qualify all Infantry battalions (except mechanized) as "Raider"-ready, there are now mechanized battalions which are "Raider"-qualified in addition to their mechanized role. Infantry battalions in the Indonesian Army originates from different combat organisations or corps, there are several infantry battalions part of Kostrad and some are part of the territorial military commands (Kodams), the same case also falls to Raider Infantry battalions. Currently, there are now 3 Airborne infantry brigades in the Indonesian Army which are all "Raider" qualified (called as: Para-raider), and are all part of the Kostrad.

The International Institute for Strategic Studies' The Military Balance 2024 report listed 47 independent infantry battalions: 3 mechanized, 20 raider, and 24 regular. More battalions are part of infantry brigades, with 2 mechanized infantry brigades containing 3 mechanized battalions and eleven infantry brigades typically containing 3 battalions each, both raider and regular.

The Infantry beret colors of the Indonesian army are as shown below:

- Regular Infantry soldiers wear: Light Green Beret with crossed-rifle insignia
- Kostrad infantrymen wear: Dark Green Beret with Kostrad emblem, (Airborne units are added a paratrooper wing insignia on the beret)
- Raider infantrymen wear: Dark Green beret with bayonet emblem
- Mechanized Infantrymen wear: Dark Green beret with Mechanized Infantry emblem

There are 6 types of Infantry battalions in the Indonesian Army, which are:

1. Parachute-Raider Infantry Battalion (abbreviated "Yonif Para Raider"): are Airborne infantry battalions part of Kostrad which are able in Air assault and Raid operations.
2. Mechanized-Raider Infantry Battalion (abbreviated "Yonif Mekanis Raider"): are Raider infantry battalions which are Mechanized that are special operations-capaable which also can carry out urban warfare and ground mechanized-infantry operations.
3. Raider Infantry Battalion (abbreviated "Yonif Raider"): are infantry battalions which are basically trained for Raid warfare and Air assault operations.
4. Mechanized Infantry Battalion (abbreviated "Yonif Mekanis"): are mobilized infantry battalions, equipped with APCs and IFVs.
5. Infantry Battalion (abbreviated "Yonif"): are light Infantry battalions.
6. Territorial Development Infantry Battalion (abbreviated "Yonif TP"): are light Infantry battalions that has specific companies for crops and livestock/fisheries agriculture, medical service, and engineers to support local communities.

All infantrymen of the Indonesian National Armed Forces (TNI), the Army included, have capabilities in Jungle warfare.

== Para-Raider infantry battalions ==
Para Raider Infantry Battalions
| No | Name | Nickname | Part of |
|---|---|---|---|
| 1. | 305th Para Raider Infantry Battalion | Tengkorak (Skeleton) | 17th Parachute Raider Infantry Brigade/Kujang I |
| 2. | 328th Para Raider Infantry Battalion | Dirgahayu | 17th Parachute Raider Infantry Brigade/Kujang I |
| 3. | 330th Para-Raider Infantry Battalion | Tri Dharma | 17th Parachute Raider Infantry Brigade/Kujang I |
| 4. | 501st Para Raider Infantry Battalion | Bajra Yudha | 18th Parachute Raider Infantry Brigade/Trisula |
| 5. | 502nd Para Raider Infantry Battalion | Ujwala Yudha | 18th Parachute Raider Infantry Brigade/Trisula |
| 6. | 503rd Para Raider Infantry Battalion | Mayangkara | 18th Parachute Raider Infantry Brigade/Trisula |
| 7. | 431st Para Raider Infantry Battalion | Satria Setia Perkasa | 3rd Parachute Raider Infantry Brigade/Tri Budi Sakti |
| 8. | 432nd Para Raider Infantry Battalion | Waspada Setia Jaya | 3rd Parachute Raider Infantry Brigade/Tri Budi Sakti |
| 9. | 433rd Para Raider Infantry Battalion | Julu Siri | 3rd Parachute Raider Infantry Brigade/Tri Budi Sakti |

== Raider infantry battalions ==
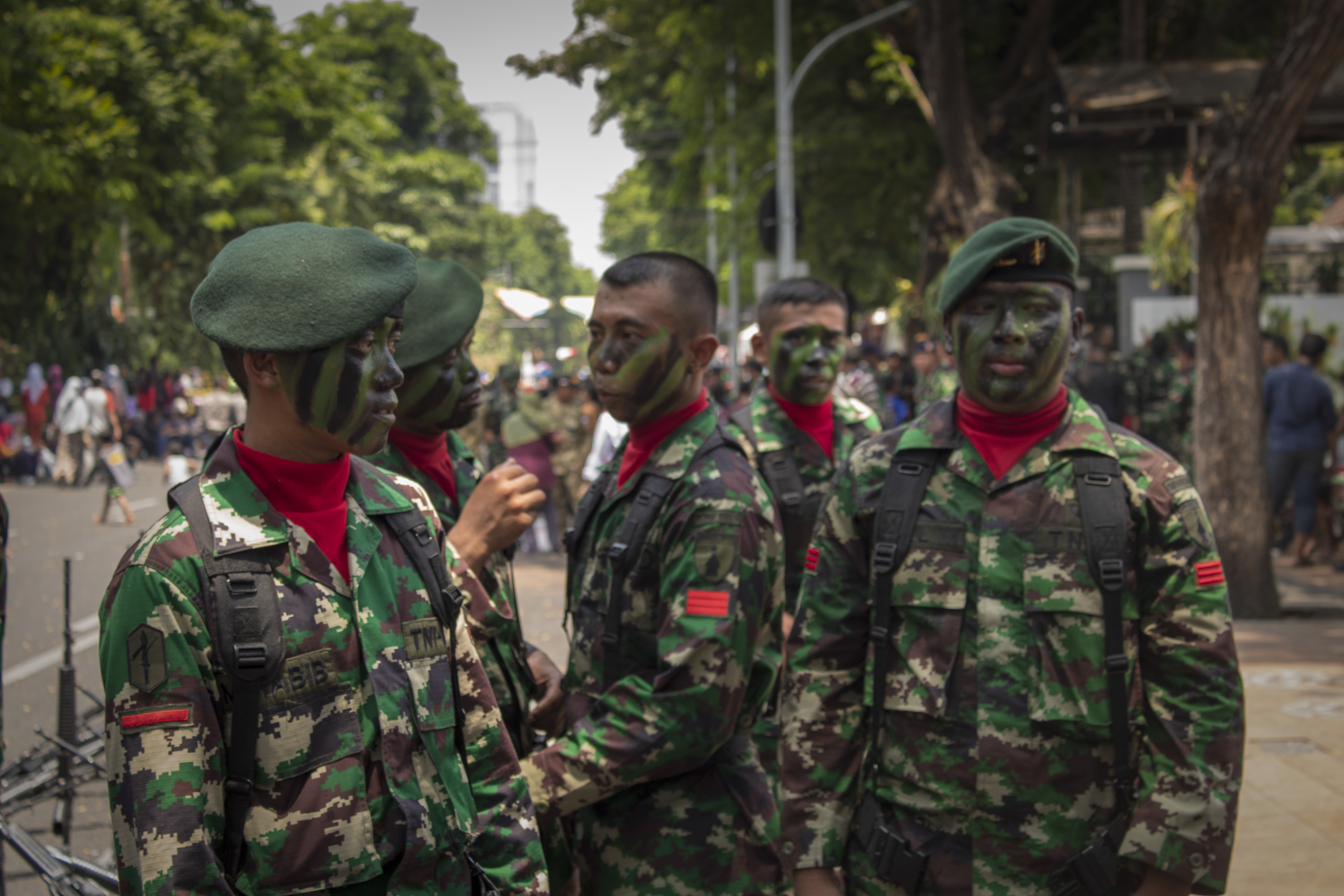
Soldiers from the 500th Raider Infantry Battalion of the Indonesian Army

In the Indonesian Army, the Raider Infantry (In Indonesia known as Yonif Raider) is a type of specialized-infantry above of regular infantry which are trained to conduct Raids, military extraction (hostage rescue), counter-terrorist, airborne, Guerrilla and Air assault operations. It also is trained to conduct urban and jungle warfare. The first ten battalions of the raider infantry which were inaugurated on December 22, 2003, were formed by transforming 8 battalions of territorial commands and 2 Kostrad battalions. As a counterweight force, the strength of a Raider Infantry Battalion (Yonif Raider) is equivalent to three times the strength of an ordinary/regular infantry battalion (Yonif) in the Army. This infantry unit is back grounded with "Raid" battle tactics known as "Depredation".

Each Raider battalion consists of approximately 810 personnel of all ranks, larger than the normal battalions of around 570 infantrymen. These personnel were given special education and training for six months for modern warfare, guerrilla and anti-guerrilla warfare, and protracted warfare tactics and strategies. Each of these battalions is trained to have triple combat capabilities of ordinary infantry battalions (Yonifs). Raider infantrymen are trained to perform ambushes, airborne and air assault operations, such as foray from helicopters and transport aircraft, while Raider infantrymen in the mechanized battalions are also trained in mechanized and urban warfare operations. 50 personnel each in a Raider battalion are Counter-terrorism qualified with other additional specialized skills. The Kopassus Special Forces Education and Training Center ("Pusdikpassus") located in Batujajar, West Java is where Raider infantrymen get their advance special operations training before being stationed to their respective Raider battalions. Aside from the Raider battalions, the Indonesian Army also fosters "Para-Raider" battalions which are Raider infantry units qualified as Airborne which all are within the Kostrad corps. There are also Raider infantry battalions which are Mechanised (Mekanis Raider) in the Army, the units are the 411th, 412th, and 413th Mechanized-Raider Infantry Battalions which are part of the 6th Infantry Brigade, 2nd Kostrad Infantry Division and the 113th Raider Infantry Battalion (Mechanized) from the 25th Infantry Brigade, Kodam Iskandar Muda.

Raider Infantry Battalions
| No | Name | Nickname | Part of |
|---|---|---|---|
| 1 | 100th Raider Infantry Battalion | Prajurit Setia | 1st Military Regional Command/Bukit Barisan |
| 2 | 200th Raider Infantry Battalion | Bhakti Nagara | 2nd Military Regional Command/Sriwijaya |
| 3 | 300th Raider Infantry Battalion | Banjar Kedaton | 3rd Military Regional Command/Siliwangi |
| 4 | 400th Raider Infantry Battalion | Banteng Raider | 4th Military Regional Command/Diponegoro |
| 5 | 500th Raider Infantry Battalion | Sikatan | 5th Military Regional Command/Brawijaya |
| 6 | 600th Raider Infantry Battalion | Modang | 6th Military Regional Command/Mulawarman |
| 7 | 700th Raider Infantry Battalion | Wira Yudha Cakti | 14th Military Regional Command/Hasanuddin |
| 8 | 900th Raider Infantry Battalion | Satya Bhakti Wirottama | 9th Military Regional Command/Udayana |
| 9 | 323rd Raider Infantry Battalion | Buaya Putih | 13th Infantry Brigade/Galuh |
| 10 | 412th Raider Infantry Battalion | Bharata Eka Shakti | 6th Infantry Brigade/Trisakti Baladaya |
| 11 | 514th Raider Infantry Battalion | Sabbada Yudha | 9th Infantry Brigade/Daraka Yudha |
| 12 | 733rd Raider Infantry Battalion | Masariku | 16th Military Regional Command/Pattimura |
| 13 | 112th Raider Infantry Battalion | Dharma Jaya | Military Regional Command Iskandar Muda |
| 14 | 641st Raider Infantry Battalion | Beruang Hitam | 12th Military Regional Command/Tanjungpura |
| 15 | 411th Raider Infantry Battalion | Phandawa | 6th Infantry Brigade/Trisakti Baladaya |
| 16 | 111st Raider Infantry Battalion | Karma Bhakti | 25th Infantry Brigade/Siwah |
| 17 | 712th Raider Infantry Battalion | Wiratama | 13nd Military Regional Command/Merdeka |
| 18 | 751st Raider Infantry Battalion | Vira Jaya Shakti | 17th Military Regional Command/Cenderawasih |
| 19 | 752nd Raider Infantry Battalion | Vira Yudha Sakti | 171st Military Area Command/Praja Vira Tama |
| 20 | 753rd Raider Infantry Battalion | Arga Vira Tama | 173nd Military Area Command/Praja Vira Braja |
| 21 | 509th Raider Infantry Battalion | Balawara Yudha | 9th Infantry Brigade/Daraka Yudha |
| 22 | 303rd Raider Infantry Battalion | Setia Sampai Mati (Loyal until Death) | 13th Infantry Brigade/Galuh |
| 23. | 136th Raider Infantry Battalion | Tuah Sakti | 31st Military Area Command/Wirabima |
| 24. | 321st Raider Infantry Battalion | Galuh Taruna | 13th Infantry Brigade/Galuh |
| 25. | 613th Raider Infantry Battalion | Raja Alam | 24th Infantry Brigade/Bulungan Cakti |
| 26. | 644th Raider Infantry Battalion | Walet Sakti | 19th Infantry Brigade/Khatulistiwa |
| 27. | 744th Raider Infantry Battalion | Satya Yudha Bhakti | 21st Infantry Brigade/Komodo |
| 28. | 408th Raider Infantry Battalion | Suhbrasta | 74th Military Area Command/Warastratama |
| 29. | 113th Raider Infantry Battalion | Jaya Sakti | 25th Infantry Brigade/Siwah |
| 30. | 515th Raider Infantry Battalion | Ugra Tapa Yudha | 9th Infantry Brigade/Daraka Yudha |
| 31. | 614th Raider Infantry Battalion | Raja Pandhita | 24th Infantry Brigade/Bulungan Cakti |
| 32. | 621st Raider Infantry Battalion | Manuntung | 101st Military Area Command/Antasari |
| 33. | 631st Raider Infantry Battalion | Antang Elang | 102nd Military Area Command/Panju Panjung |
| 34. | 114th Raider Infantry Battalion | Satria Musara | 25th Infantry Brigade/Siwah |
| 35. | 115th Raider Infantry Battalion | Macan Leuser | 25th Infantry Brigade/Siwah |
| 36. | 142nd Raider Infantry Battalion | Ksatria Jaya | 42nd Military Area Command/Garuda Putih |
| 37. | 754th Raider Infantry Battalion | Eme Neme kangasi | 20th Infantry Brigade/Ima jaya keramo |
| 38. | 755th Raider Infantry Battalion | Yalet | 20th Infantry Brigade/Ima jaya keramo |
| 39. | 301st Raider Infantry Battalion | Prabu Kian Santang | 62nd Military Area Command/Taruma Nagara |
| 40. | 641st Raider Infantry Battalion | Beruang | 19th Infantry Brigade/Khatulistiwa |
| 41. | 715th Raider Infantry Battalion | Motuliato | 22nd Infantry Brigade/Ota Manasa |

== Other infantry battalions ==
=== Regular infantry battalions ===
Regular infantry battalions below are categorized as Light infantry battalions, which some are "Raider" qualified. They are addressed as "Yonif" (abbreviated from Batalyon Infanteri) in Indonesian, for example Yonif 125 means: 125th Infantry Battalion. The lists are as shown below:

1. 116th Infantry Battalion
2. 121st Infantry Battalion
3. 122nd Infantry Battalion
4. 123rd Infantry Battalion
5. 125th Infantry Battalion
6. 126th Infantry Battalion
7. 131st Infantry Battalion
8. 132nd Infantry Battalion
9. 133rd Infantry Battalion
10. 141st Infantry Battalion
11. 143rd Infantry Battalion
12. 144th Infantry Battalion
13. 310th Infantry Battalion
14. 312th Infantry Battalion
15. 315th Infantry Battalion
16. 403rd Infantry Battalion
17. 405th Infantry Battalion
18. 406th Infantry Battalion
19. 407th Infantry Battalion
20. 410th Infantry Battalion
21. 511th Infantry Battalion
22. 527th Infantry Battalion
23. 611th Infantry Battalion
24. 623rd Infantry Battalion
25. 642nd Infantry Battalion
26. 644th Infantry Battalion
27. 645th Infantry Battalion
28. 711th Infantry Battalion
29. 713th Infantry Battalion
30. 714th Infantry Battalion
31. 721st Infantry Battalion
32. 725th Infantry Battalion
33. 726th Infantry Battalion
34. 731st Infantry Battalion
35. 732nd Infantry Battalion
36. 734th Infantry Battalion
37. 742nd Infantry Battalion
38. 743rd Infantry Battalion
39. 757th Infantry Battalion
40. 761st Infantry battalion
41. 764th Infantry Battalion

=== Mechanized infantry battalions (including Raider battalions) ===
- Part of the 1st Capital City Defense Mechanized Infantry Brigade, Kodam Jaya (Brigade Infanteri 1 Pengaman Ibu Kota/"Jaya Sakti")
1. 201st Mechanized Infantry Battalion
2. 202nd Mechanized Infantry Battalion
3. 203rd Mechanized Infantry Battalion
- Part of the 6th Mechanized Raider Infantry Brigade, Kostrad (Brigade Infanteri Mekanis 6/"Trisakti Baladaya")
1. 411th Mechanized Infantry Battalion (Raider qualified)
2. 412th Mechanized Infantry Battalion (Raider qualified)
3. 413th Mechanized Infantry Battalion (Raider qualified)
- Part of the 14th Mechanized Infantry Brigade, Kostrad (Brigade Infanteri Mekanis 14/"Mandala Yudha")
1. 318th Mechanized Infantry Battalion
2. 320th Mechanized Infantry Battalion
- Part of the 16th Mechanized Infantry Brigade, Kodam V/Brawijaya (Brigade Infanteri 16/"Wira Yudha")
1. 512th Mechanized Infantry Battalion
2. 516th Mechanized Infantry Battalion
3. 521st Mechanized Infantry Battalion
- Part of Kodam XII/Tanjungpura military district command
1. 643rd Mechanized Infantry Battalion.
- Part of Kodam IX/Udayana military district command
1. 741st Mechanized Infantry Battalion
- Part of Kodam IV/Diponegoro military district command
1. 403rd Mechanized Infantry Battalion
- Part of 091/Aji Surya Natakusuma Military Area command
1. 611th Mechanized Infantry Battalion
- Part of 25th Infantry Brigade, Kodam Iskandar Muda
1. 113th Mechanized Infantry Battalion (Raider qualified)

=== Territorial development infantry battalions ===
Territorial development infantry battalions are territorial light infantry battalions that has specific companies intended to support the development of local communities on agricultural self-sufficiency, medical service, and engineering works during peacetime. They are addressed as "Yonif TP" (abbreviated from Batalyon Infanteri Teritorial Pembangunan) in Indonesian, for example Yonif TP 853 means: 853rd Territorial Development Infantry Battalion. The lists are as shown below:

1. 801st Territorial Development Infantry Battalion
2. 802nd Territorial Development Infantry Battalion
3. 803rd Territorial Development Infantry Battalion
4. 804th Territorial Development Infantry Battalion
5. 805th Territorial Development Infantry Battalion
6. 853rd Territorial Development Infantry Battalion
7. 854th Territorial Development Infantry Battalion
8. 855th Territorial Development Infantry Battalion
9. 856th Territorial Development Infantry Battalion
10. 857th Territorial Development Infantry Battalion

== Formerly infantry battalion ==
1. 745 Infantry Battalion
2. 755 Infantry Battalion

== See also ==
- 1st Kostrad Infantry Division
- 2nd Kostrad Infantry Division
- 3rd Kostrad Infantry Division
