= 21st Cavalry =

21st Cavalry may refer to:

== Divisions ==
- 21st Cavalry Division, United States

== Brigades ==
- 21st Cavalry Brigade, United States

== Regiments ==
- 21st Alberta Hussars
- 21st Cavalry Regiment (United States)
- 21st Horse (Central India Horse)
- 21st Lancers
- 21st Prince Albert Victor's Own Cavalry
- 21st Regiment of (Light) Dragoons
- XXI Corps Cavalry Regiment

=== American Civil War units ===
==== Union Army ====
- 21st New York Cavalry Regiment

==== Confederate Army ====
- 21st Texas Cavalry Regiment
- 21st Virginia Cavalry Regiment

== Companies ==
- 21st (Cheshire) Company, Imperial Yeomanry

== See also ==
- 21st Division (disambiguation)
- 21st Brigade (disambiguation)
- 21st (disambiguation)
