= XXI Corps =

21 Corps, 21st Corps, Twenty First Corps, or XXI Corps may refer to:

== Germany ==
- XXI Corps (German Empire), Imperial German Army, prior to and during World War I
- XXI Mountain Corps, Wehrmacht, World War II
- XXI Army Corps (Wehrmacht), World War II

== India ==
- Indian XXI Corps, World War II
- XXI Corps (India), currently active

== Russia and Soviet Union ==
=== Russian Empire ===
- 21st Army Corps (Russian Empire)

=== Soviet Union ===
- 21st Air Defence Corps
- 21st Mechanized Corps
- 21st Rifle Corps
- 21st Silesia Rifle Corps

== United Kingdom ==
- XXI Corps (United Kingdom), World War I

=== Rifle Volunteer Corps ===
- 21st (Stockport) Cheshire Rifle Volunteer Corps
- 21st (Hartington) Derbyshire Rifle Volunteer Corps
- 21st Kent (Lewisham) Rifle Volunteer Corps
- 21st (Parkhead Artisans) Lanarkshire Rifle Volunteer Corps
- 21st Lancashire Rifle Volunteer Corps
- 21st (Wigan) Lancashire Rifle Volunteer Corps
- 21st (Civil Service Rifles) Middlesex Rifle Volunteer Corps
- 21st (Finsbury Rifles) Middlesex Rifle Volunteer Corps
- 21st (Aldeburgh) Suffolk Rifle Volunteer Corps
- 21st (Doncaster Burgesses) Yorkshire West Riding Rifle Volunteer Corps
- 21st (Middlesbrough) Yorkshire North Riding Rifle Volunteer Corps

== United States ==
- XXI Corps (United States), World War II
- XXI Corps (Union Army), American Civil War

== Other countries ==
- XXI Army Corps (Italy)
- XXI Corps (Ottoman Empire), World War I
- 21st Army Corps (Ukraine)

== See also ==
- List of military corps by number
- 21st Army (disambiguation)
- 21st Brigade (disambiguation)
- 21st Division (disambiguation)
- 21st Regiment (disambiguation)
- 21st Squadron (disambiguation)
- 21st Battalion (disambiguation)
- 21st (disambiguation)
