= 21st Mountain Division =

21st Mountain Division may refer to:

- 21st Waffen Mountain Division of the SS Skanderbeg, Nazi Germany
- 21st Mountain Division (India)
- 21st Mountain Infantry Division (Poland)

== See also ==
- 21st Division (disambiguation)
