= 94 Field Regiment (India) =

Indian Army artillery unit

- Active: 1963 – present
- Country: India
- Allegiance: India
- Branch: Indian Army
- Type: Artillery
- Size: Regiment
- Nickname(s): Charwa Gunners
- Motto(s): Sarvatra, Izzat-O-Iqbal (Everywhere with Honour and Glory)
- Colors: Red & Navy Blue
- Anniversaries: 20 June – Raising Day

Insignia
- Abbreviation: 94 Fd Regt

94 Field Regiment is part of the Regiment of Artillery of the Indian Army.

== Formation and history ==
The regiment was raised as 94 Mountain Composite Regiment (Towed) on 20 June 1963 at Haldwani. The first commanding officer was Lieutenant Colonel Sukhinder Singh. It was initially equipped with 120 mm Brandt mortars. The regiment consists of headquarters battery, 941, 942 and 943 field batteries.

== Operations ==
The regiment has taken part in the following operations –

- Indo-Pakistani War of 1965 – Operation Nepal and Operation Riddle (August 1965 to April 1967). The regiment saw action in the Sialkot Sector. It was in direct support to 99 Mountain Brigade and was instrumental in the destruction of Charwa defence of Pakistan. The unit lost nine men during the war and won one Vir Chakra, four Mention-in-Despatches and one COAS Commendation Card.
- Indo-Pakistani War of 1971 – (Operation Cactus Lily – December 1971 to January 1972) - The regiment was equipped with 75 mm howitzers and was under 6 Mountain Artillery Brigade of 6 Mountain Division (under 33 Corps).
- Operation Blue Star (November 1983 to May 1984). The regiment along with 11 Rajputana Rifles were given the task of intercepting rebellious soldiers of 9 Sikh stationed at Ganganagar, Rajasthan, who had mutinied on the night of 7 June 1984 and were heading to Punjab. A few of them were arrested and many were killed during a clash near Govindgarh.
- Operation Rakshak – May 1990 – May 1991 (Jammu and Kashmir)
- Operation Rakshak and Operation Meghdoot – October 1996 to August 1998 - (Jammu and Kashmir and Siachen glacier)
- Operation Vijay – June 1999 to November 1999
- Operation Rhino and Operation Falcon – (September 2001 to September 2005) – the regiment was involved in counterinsurgency operations in Golaghat, Jorhat, Karbi Anglong and Nagaon districts of Assam. Due its excellent performance during this tenure, the regiment was awarded the Chief of Army Staff Unit Citation on 15 January 2006.
- Operation Rakshak II – June 2009 to November 2010

== Gallantry awards ==
The regiment has won the following gallantry awards –

- Vir Chakra (VrC) – 1 (Lance Havildar Fidoo Ram)
- Sena Medal (SM) – 3
- Vishisht Seva Medal – 1 (Colonel Ajay Kumar Sharma)
- Mentioned in dispatches – 5
- Chief of Army Staff Commendation cards – 25
- Vice Chief of Army Staff Commendation cards – 5
- General Officer Commanding-in-chief Commendation cards – 62
- Chief of Defence Staff Commendation cards – 2
- B R O Commendation cards – 2
- S F C Commendation cards – 1

== Notable officers ==
- Lieutenant General KK Kohli AVSM, VSM – GOC of 21 Mountain Division, Commandant of the Officers Training Academy, Chief of Staff of South Western Command.
- Brigadier FB Da Gama Rose
- Lieutenant General PR Kumar PVSM, AVSM, VSM – Colonel Commandant of the Regiment of Artillery and Director General Military Operations (DGMO).

== Other achievements ==
- Naib Subedar Baldev Singh - He participated in Services Volleyball Championship for several years and was selected for the National Volleyball team in 1997.
- Naib Subedar Ravi Kumar - He participated in 1988-89 Inter Services Athletic Championship.
- Naik (DMT) Balraj Singh Katoch - He represented services Basket Ball championship six times from 1985 to 1990.

== See also ==
- List of artillery regiments of Indian Army
