= 21 =

Twenty-one, XXI or 21 may refer to:

- 21 (number), the natural number following 20 and preceding 22
- One of the years 21 BC, AD 21, 1921, 2021

== Films ==
- The 21, directed by Tod Polson
- 21 (2008 film), starring Kevin Spacey, Laurence Fishburne, Jim Sturgess, and Kate Bosworth.
- Twenty-One (1991 film), starring Patsy Kensit
- Twenty-One (1923 film), starring Richard Barthelmess
- Twenty-One (1918 film), starring Bryant Washburn

== Science ==
- Scandium, a transition metal in the periodic table
- 21 Lutetia, an asteroid in the asteroid belt

== Music ==
- XXI (band), a band formerly known as A Feast for Kings
- Twenty One Pilots, American musical duo
- 21 Savage, an Atlanta-based rapper

=== Albums ===
- 21 (EP), a 2015 EP by Hunter Hayes
- 21 (Omarion album), 2006
- 21 (Adele album), 2011
- 21 (Rage album), 2012
- Twenty One (Geri Allen album), 1994
- Twenty One (Mystery Jets album), 2008
- Twenty 1, a 1991 album by Chicago
- XXI, a 2015 box set by Rammstein

=== Songs ===
- "21" (The Paddingtons song), 2004
- "21" (Hunter Hayes song), 2015
- "21" (Polo G song), 2020
- "21", a song by Ayra Starr on The Year I Turned 21
- "21", a song by Corey Hart on Young Man Running
- "21", a song by Craig Davis from 22 (2022)
- "21", a song by DaBaby from Blank Blank
- "21", a song by Dean from 130 mood: TRBL
- "21", a song by Gracie Abrams on minor (EP)
- "21", a 2015 song by Cory Marks from This Man
- "21", a 2010 song by Flo Rida from Only One Flo (Part 1)
- "21", a 2018 song by Mitch James
- 21?!, a 2008 song and EP by Marya Roxx
- "Twenty One", a song by The Shirelles
- "Twenty One", a song by Khalid from Free Spirit
- "Twenty-One", a song by The Eagles from Desperado
- "Twenty One", a song by The Cranberries from No Need to Argue
- "Twenty One", a song by Corey Smith

== Games and sports ==
- Twenty-One (card game), forerunner of Blackjack and Pontoon
- 21 (drinking game), a counting game
- 21, also "Counting to 21 game" or "21 game", a Nim-style counting game
- Twenty-one (basketball), a basketball variation
- Twenty-One (game show), an American game show from 1956 to 1958 and in 2000
- Catch 21, an American game show based on Blackjack

== Other uses ==
- 21 (novel) or The Final Unfinished Voyage of Jack Aubrey, by Patrick O'Brian, 2004
- "21" (Boardwalk Empire), an episode of the Boardwalk Empire television series
- 21 Club, a former restaurant and nightclub in New York City
- Twentyone Lake, a lake in Minnesota
- Caterham 21, a roadster
- 21 Cineplex, an Indonesian movie theater chain
- 21 Emon, a Japanese manga series

== See also ==
- 021 (disambiguation)
- 21st (disambiguation)
- Twenty to One, a 1935 British musical comedy
- List of highways numbered 21
