= 21st Battalion =

21st Battalion may refer to:

- 21st Battalion (Australia), a World War I ANZAC battalion
- 2/21st Battalion (Australia), a World War II Australian infantry battalion
- 21st Battalion (New Zealand), a World War II New Zealand infantry battalion
- 21st Battalion (Eastern Ontario), CEF, a World War I battalion that formed part of the Canadian Corps
- 21st Battalion, London Regiment (First Surrey Rifles)

== See also ==
- XXI Corps (disambiguation)
- 21st Division (disambiguation)
- 21st Brigade (disambiguation)
- 21st Regiment (disambiguation)
- 21st Squadron (disambiguation)
