= 305th Airborne Raider Infantry Battalion (Indonesia) =

- Batalyon Infanteri Para Raider 305/Tengkorak
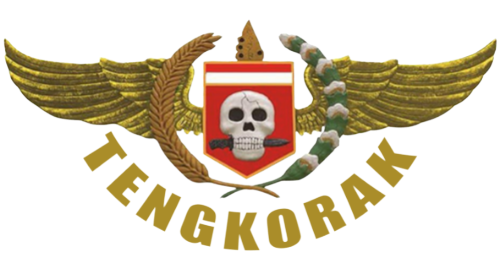
- Founded: September 7, 1949
- Country: Indonesia
- Branch: Indonesian Army
- Type: The Raiders
- Role: TNI Rapid Reaction Force
- Website: www.brigiflinud17.mil.id

The 305th Airborne Raider Infantry Battalion (Indonesian: Batalyon Infanteri Para Raider 305/Tengkorak) is an Indonesian Army unit. It is one of the three Battalions of the Raiders in the 17th Airborne Raider Infantry Brigade, 1st Kostrad Infantry Division. This Infantry Battalion was established on September 7, 1949, in Bintaran Kulon, Yogyakarta.

Battalion Headquarters Raider 305 / Skull is in Desa Sirnabaya, Teluk Jambe Timur District, Karawang Regency.

== History ==
=== War for independence ===
The unit was created in 1945, directly under the control of the Headquarters TKR. In 1946 it was renamed "Mobile Battalion" under the leadership of Captain Nasuhi. In 1947 it was organized into the Mobile Brigade Unit with the core Yon A in Yogyakarta, Yon B in Solo and Yon C in Tawangmangu Karanganyar. In 1948, with the rationalization and reorganization of the Indonesian Armed Forces (APRI) Yon A was renamed Battalion I Brigade IV Siliwangi III of the General Reserve Reserve Z. IN November 1948, when the Siliwangi Division was headquartered in Magelang, Battalion I Brigade IV was included in the Siliwangi Division Brigade under the name "Battalion IV Brigade XIV Siliwangi Division".

=== Post-war ===
Based on Siliwangi Division Order No. 56 / DB / 49 of 24 August 1949 and Decree of the Commander of the Battle of Tasikmalaya, 7 September 1949 is designated as the Anniversary of Battalion C. Battalion C is the result of reorganization from Yon IV Brigade XIV into two battalions namely:

- Battalion B, which was in the Core 1 and 2 Corps with Captain Kaharudin Nasution
- Battalion C, which was in the Core 3 and 4 Corps with Captain Mung Parahadimulyo

The two Battalions were formed from East Priangan Brigade 13. In 1951 Battalion C changed its name to Battalion 135 Brigade B which was finally established at the end of 1951 with the name "Infantry Battalion 305 / Skull."

Battalion 305 became an organic unit 17th Airborne Raider Infantry Brigade, based in Karawang, West Java. Infantry Battalion 305 entered into Kostrad in 1969 when it was renamed the 305nd Infantry Battalion Battalion / Skull, Brigadier Linud 17 / Kujang I, Kostrad and based in Jambe Bay, Karawang, West Java.

== Motto ==
The otto of the Republic of Indonesia is "Build His Soul, Build His Body". Infantry Battalion 305 adopted two slogans, one for the soul and one for action.

=== Motto of the soul ===
Their motto of the soul is "From Give Better Dead Mirrors As Skulls", which implies that its soldiers are always enthusiastic and never accept failure. Accompanied by sincerity and always close to God Almighty, they are prepared at any time to die facing the Divine.

=== Motto of action ===
Their motto of action is "Fast - Secret - Successful", which is a Reflection and a Prayer that the Soldiers of the Skull Raider are always:

- Fast in thinking and acting, always well coordinated.
- Stealthy - infiltration and exfiltration unnoticed, and never leave footprints.
- Successful in every activity and assignment.

== Para and Raider Status ==
Airborne or Paradier status was obtained by Infantry Battalion 305 in 1966 after completing Para's basic education in Batujajar. 20 May 1966 was designated as Infantry Battalion 305 Para, Brigadier 17 Linud Kujang, Kodam III / Siliwangi | Kodam VI / Siliwangi. Raider status was obtained at the end of 1967. Raider training at the Cititis Complex, Garut was inaugurated on 20 January 1968, with the nickname "Kujang Raider", the range under Brigif 17 Linud Kujang, Kodam VI Siliwangi. The validation is based on Kasad Regulation Number 55 Year 2016 dated 7 December 2016 concerning the Organization and Duties of the Infantry Battalion of the Raiders. Infantry Battalion 305 / Skull changed to Infantry Battalion 305 / Skull. At this time all Yonif Para Raider 305 / Skull warriors are required to undergo Raider qualifications at the Pusdikpassus Batu Jajar, after carrying out Cakra warrior formation training.

== Commanders of the Infantry Battalion ==
- 1st Battalion commander: Major Inf Mung Parahadimulyo (1949 to 1953)
- 2nd Battalion commander: Major Inf Kustarjo (1953 to 1954)
- 3rd Battalion commander: Captain Inf Ishak Djuarsa (1954 to 1955)
- 4th Battalion commander: Captain Inf Samuri (1955 to 1956)
- 5th Battalion commander: Captain Inf Latief A (1956 to 1958)
- 6th Battalion commander: Captain Inf E. Sukma (1958 to 1961)
- 7th Battalion commander: Major Inf Surdjani (1961 to 1962)
- 8th Battalion commander: Major Inf Bakir (1962 to 1964)
- 9th Battalion commander: Major Inf Nanang Suhanir (1964 to 1966)
- 10th Battalion commander: Major Inf A. Gani (1966 to 1967)
- 11th Battalion commander: Major Inf Hartono AR (1967 to 1970)
- 12th Battalion commander: Major Inf Atma Wijaya (1970 to 1973)
- 13th Battalion commander: Major Inf Arie Sudewo. (1973 to 1975)
- 14th Battalion commander: Major Inf Amir Sutanto. (1975 to 1975)
- 15th Battalion commander: Lt. Col. Inf Abinowo (1975 to 1976)
- 16th Battalion commander: Lt. Col. Inf Ade Picaulima. (1976 to 1978)
- 17th Battalion commander: Major Inf D. Paliyama (1978 to 1979)
- 18th Battalion commander: Lieutenant Colonel Inf Suwandi. (1979 to 1981)
- 19th Battalion commander: Lt. Col. Inf B. Simbolon. (1981 to 1984)
- 20th Battalion commander: Lieutenant Colonel Inf Tasrifin. (1984 to 1985)
- 21st Battalion commander: Major Inf Ismed Yuzairi. (1985 to 1987)
- 22nd Battalion commander: Major Inf Amir Abdul Kadir (1987 to 1988)
- 23rd Battalion commander: Major Inf Agus Wirahadikusumah. (1988 to 1988)
- 24th Battalion commander: Lieutenant Colonel Inf Albert Inkiriwang. (1988 to 1989)
- 25th Battalion commander: Major Inf Iwan R Sulanjana. (1989 to 1990)
- 26th Battalion commander: Major Inf Ryamizard Ryacudu (1990 to 1993)
- 27th Battalion commander: Lt. Col. Inf Amirudin Usman. (1993 to 1994)
- 28th Battalion commander: Lt. Col. Inf Sarining Setyo Utomo. (1994 to 1995)
- 29th Battalion commander: Major Inf Sigit Yuwono. (1995 to 1996)
- 30th Battalion commander: Lt. Col. Inf Adi Mulyono. (1996 to 1997)
- 31st Battalion commander: Major Inf B. Zuirman. (1997 to 1998)
- 32nd Battalion commander: Major Inf Surawahadi. (1998 to 2000)
- 33rd Battalion commander: Major Inf Taufan Kristian. (2000 to 2002)
- 34th Battalion commander: Lt. Col. Inf Agus Rohman. (2002 to 2005)
- 35th Battalion commander: Lt. Col. Inf Syafrial (2005 to 2007)
- 36th Battalion commander: Lt. Col. Inf Endro Satoto (2007 to 2009)
- 37th Battalion commander: Lt. Col. Inf Christian K. Tehuteru (2009 to 2011)
- 38th Battalion commander: Lt. Col. Inf Elkines Villando DK, S.AP (2011 to 2013)
- 39th Battalion commander: Lt. Col. Inf Kristomei Sianturi (2013 to 2014)
- 40th Battalion commander: Letkol Inf Dwi Sasongko (2014 to 2017)
- 41st Battalion commander: Lt. Col. Inf Sumarlin Marzuki, SE (2017 to 2017)
- 42nd Battalion commander: Lt. Col. Inf Denny Juwon Pranata, M.Tr. Han. (2017 to 2018)
- 43rd Battalion commander: Major Inf Fajar Akhirudin, SIP, M.Sc. (2018- )

== Combat experience ==
1. War against the Dutch during the revolution (1945–1950)
2. Crushing DI / TII and saving SIliwangi Panji from DI / TII (1949)
3. PRRI / Permesta Operations (1950)
4. Operation Dwikora (1964–1965)
5. Crush the PKI G30S (1965)
6. Crushing of PGRS PARAKU of West Kalimantan (1968)
7. Operation Seroja (1976–77, 1980–81, 1986–87, 1994–95)
8. Eradication of the Free Aceh Movement (2002)
9. Papua's Security Operation (15 March 1996)
10. Peace Operations in Cambodia "Garuda XII-A through C" (1992)
11. Peace Operations in Lebanon "Garuda XXIII-A" (2006–2007)
12. Safeguarding the RI-Malaysia Border in West Kalimantan (2012–2013)
13. Peace Operations in Lebanon "Kongas Yonmek Konga XXIII-J" (2015–2016)
