= Operation Cahaya =

1978 Military operations on Timor Leste

- Part of Indonesian occupation of East Timor
Date	6 April – 31 December 1978
Location	Matebian, East Timor
Result	Indonesian victory

Belligerents
Indonesia	FRETILIN

Commanders and leaders
(Indonesia) Mohammad Jusuf	(Democratic Republic of East Timor (1975)) Nicolau dos Reis Lobato †; Alarico Fernandes (surrendered)

Units involved
ABRI; Kostrad; 744th Infantry Battalion; 700th Infantry Battalion; 401st Infantry Battalion; Kopassus; Team-28	FALINTIL

Strength
5 OV-10 Bronco; 3 F-5; 2 A-4 Skyhawk; 13 Battalions from Kostrad	Thousands of soldiers

Casualties and losses
Unknown	Hundreds of soldiers were killed
- Many civilians killed by the bombing

Operation Cahaya (lit. 'Light'; Indonesian: Operasi Cahaya) was a military operation launched by Indonesia with the objective of capturing several top leaders of Fretilin and attacking the group's main base on Mount Matebian. The operation is also regarded as the last major Indonesian offensive in East Timor following Operation Seroja and the Battle of Dili. It resulted in the ambush and assassination of Nicolau Lobato, the surrender of several Fretilin leaders, and the capture of the main base on Mount Matebian by Indonesian forces, marking the end of the Indonesian invasion of East Timor.

== Background ==
In 1975, Indonesia launched a large-scale offensive against East Timor. The offensive was successful, and most of the East Timor territory was captured by Indonesian forces. Following the invasion, Indonesia occupied most of the region, although the Fretilin guerrilla movement remained active. Around this time, the ABRI began to reduce its presence in East Timor, leading Fretilin to believe it could launch a counterattack. However, internal conflicts and violent purges within Fretilin prevented such efforts from succeeding.

With support from the United States, 13 North American Rockwell OV-10 Bronco aircraft were supplied to assist Indonesian military operations in the Papua conflict and Operation Seroja. Indonesian forces conducted offensives on Mount Ossoala and Mount Mundo Perdido, disrupting Fretilin guerrilla activities and bombing their bases. On 6 April 1978, following the promotion of Mohammad Jusuf to General of the Army, a new operation—codenamed "Operation Cahaya"—was launched. Its objectives were to compel the surrender or elimination of top Fretilin commanders, disrupt their communications, and capture Fretilin's main base on Mount Matebian.

== Operations ==
In 1978, Kostrad deployed 13 battalions to the eastern region under the command of RTP 18 Kostrad. The newly mobilized troops initiated a blockade and siege of Mount Matebian. The operation involved battalions from Kostrad, Army Infantry units, the Marine Corps, and the Air Force. An ex-Kostrad officer described the tactics used during the siege of Mount Matebian:

Every unit had its own route and attacked from different flanks. Before the attack, coordination was carried out to avoid friendly fire. We planned to attack simultaneously using the L formation. We did all of this to prevent friendly fire and the deaths of our comrades.

The attack represented the final large-scale Indonesian offensive in East Timor. Fretilin prepared Mount Matebian as a fallback position and stocked it with food supplies. When the campaign began, Fretilin forces led civilians to Mount Matebian, establishing strong defensive positions throughout the area. However, the zone quickly fell to Indonesian control. By 22 November, Indonesian troops continued their advance, bombarding Fretilin positions in the remaining free zone with rockets and mortars.

=== Bombing of Mount Matebian ===
A key factor in Indonesia's success during the operation was the aerial bombardment carried out by the Indonesian Air Force using OV-10 Bronco, F-5, and A-4 Skyhawk aircraft. The bombing began in September or October 1978 and intensified in mid-November. Civilians reported that the bombings struck numerous targets, including non-combatants, resulting in widespread civilian casualties. Tomas Soares Da Silva, a Timorese civilian who was sixteen years old at the time, recounted his experience of the bombing:

The bombing occurred in October and November at Mount Matebian. One bomb was poisoned. When the bombers dropped the poisoned bomb in the morning, many civilians became victims. We saw the explosion as the grass burned; the bomb set fire to much of the vegetation, and in this area, all of the crops were destroyed by the bombs.

=== Surrender of Fretilin Leaders ===
In November 1978, the Fretilin Minister of Communications and Security, Alarico Fernandes, surrendered after being surrounded by Indonesian forces. Following his surrender, other Fretilin figures also capitulated on 22 December. Civilians remaining at Mount Matebian were taken to camps by Indonesian forces, and many were interrogated, with the exception of Xanana Gusmão. In his autobiography, Xanana wrote:

The enemy quickly advanced on our positions, and my troops were sent to western Matebian. Explosions, civilian deaths, tears, and withdrawal followed. But the people were silent—perhaps weary of the situation—but we were prepared to die there. My forces retreated as the enemy pushed forward.

One day, I woke to the sound of one of the enemy soldiers calling my name through a loudspeaker. They said: "Adjunto Xanana, you do not need to continue the attacks. Command your forces to surrender!"

They came from Uatarbacau in a single night and advanced through the strategic positions in Uatarbacau to force our troops to surrender.

=== Ambush at Maubisse ===
Captain Prabowo Subianto, then commander of the Nanggala-28 unit of Kopassus, was assigned to capture Nicolau Lobato. The 744th Infantry Battalion, led by Yunus Yosfiah, also took part in the ambush, supported by the 700th and 401st Infantry Battalions. On 30 December 1978, at 05:00, Captain Prabowo Subianto reported to Major Yunus Yosfiah that Fretilin troops were moving south in large numbers. The Central Sector Commander, Colonel Tottori Sahala King, immediately ordered a siege of the target area. The formation of the Indonesian forces was as follows:

1. Nanggala-28 Team (Kopassus): North side
2. 700th and 401st Infantry Battalions: East side
3. 744th Infantry Battalion: Spearhead of the attack

Colonel Sahala Rajagukguk, upon receiving the reports, ordered the tightening of the blockade around Lobato's forces to encircle the Fretilin troops. Captain Prabowo Subianto was instructed to coordinate the siege with all available units. The Nanggala-28 team advanced toward Fretilin positions and opened fire on Nicolau Lobato and his forces. A firefight broke out, resulting in the deaths of Lobato's guards. Lobato attempted to flee with his remaining troops but was intercepted by Indonesian forces. The 744th Infantry Battalion engaged the Fretilin forces again, and during the exchange, Lobato was killed by Sergeant Jacobus Maradebo. Following his death, Mohammad Jusuf, the ABRI Commander, reported to Suharto that Nicolau Lobato had been killed.

== Aftermath ==
Following the fall and bombing of Fretilin's main bases on Mount Matebian, thousands of civilians surrendered. In early 1979, Indonesian forces shifted their focus to pursuing the remaining Fretilin fighters and civilians in the valleys of the Dilor River, Ermera, Fatubesi, and the Mount Kablaki district, located along the Ainaro–Manufahi border. The ABRI offensive in Fatubesi caused internal divisions within Fretilin's command structure, and by early February, one faction of Fretilin had surrendered to Indonesian forces. The remaining Fretilin units that refused to surrender were subsequently pursued by ABRI troops. At Mount Kablaki, Indonesian forces compelled civilians to descend the mountain, where they were captured by troops waiting below.

In South Manatuto, the Marine Corps, supported by the Indonesian Air Force, launched a new campaign codenamed "Operation Pembersihan" (Operation Cleansing), aimed at eliminating remaining Fretilin guerrilla bases. Meanwhile, military units stationed at Matebian were redeployed to Baucau and Lautém to blockade the surviving Fretilin companies. In February 1979, Mau Lear, one of the Fretilin commanders, was captured and executed. Captured Fretilin fighters were sent to detention camps. By 26 March 1979, Operation Seroja was declared complete, and Indonesia had effectively consolidated control over East Timor.

== Sources ==
- Antonio (2006). "Sejarah Konflik Timor Timor" (PDF). etan.org (in Indonesian).
- Carmel, Budiardjo (1984). The War Against East Timor. Zed Books. ISBN 9780862322281.
- Nicolo (2010). Chega. Gramedia. ISBN 9789799102454.
- James, Dunn (1996). Timor:A People Betrayed. ABC Books. ISBN 9780733305375.
- John G, Taylor (1991). Indonesia Forgotten War:The Hidden History Of East Timor. Zed Books. ISBN 9781856490153.
- Hendro, Subroto (1997). Eyewitness to Integration of East Timor. Pustaka Sinar Harapan. ISBN 9789794165195.
- Xanana, Gusmao (2000). To Resist is to Win!: The Autobiography of Xanana Gusmao with Selected Letters & Speeches. Aurora Books. ISBN 9781863550710.
