= 021 (disambiguation) =

021 is an area code used for cities in many countries.

021 may also refer to:

- Codex Campianus, a manuscript
- Type 021-class missile boat, a missile boat class
- Tyrrell 021, a Formula One racing car

== See also ==
- O21 (disambiguation)
- 21 (disambiguation)
