= 400th Raider Infantry Battalion =

Indonesian army unit

- Yonif Raider 400/Banteng Raiders
- Founded: 23 March 1953
- Country: Indonesia
- Branch: Indonesian Army
- Type: Raider Infantry
- Part of: Kodam IV/Diponegoro
- Garrison/HQ: Jl. Setia Budi, Srondol, Semarang, Central Java
- Nickname: Banteng Raiders (Raider Bulls)
- Mottos: Maju Terus Pantang Mundur (Keep moving forward, never give up)
- Anniversaries: 23 March
- Engagements: Darul Islam rebellion 1952-1956
- Website: www.kodam4.mil.id

Commanders
- Commandant: Lt Col Inf Arfan Johan Wihananto
- Notable commanders: Lt Col Inf Ahmad Yani (1951-1953); Captain Inf Sugiono (1954-1957); Major Inf Oentoeng (1963-1964)

The 400th Raider Infantry Battalion (Indonesian: Yonif Raider 400/Banteng Raiders) is one of the 42 active Indonesian Army Raider Infantry Battalions. It was founded on 23 March 1953 and was transformed into its present form on Army Day, 22 December 2003 - one of the first generation Raider Battalions to be raised. The Banteng Raiders honorific honors the battalion being raised in response towards the threat posed by the Darul Islam's armed wing, the Tentara Islam Indonesia, in its area of operations as part of Kodam IV/Diponegoro territorial command, and its origins date back to 1950. It also took part in the events following the 1965 30 September Movement, wherein infantrymen from the Battalion were operationally deployed to Jakarta. (Ironically, the leader of the movement. Lt Col Untung Syamsuri, was a former commanding officer with the battalion.)

The battalion today is stationed in Semarang in Central Java.

== Brief history ==
In January 1950, the Darul Islam (DI) movement was beginning to threaten the peace in Central Java, just weeks after the Netherlands government awarded all its colonial processions to the United States of Indonesia, ending centuries of Dutch rule. To deal with the grave military situation in the province, given the worsening health of the then Commander of the Indonesian National Armed Forces Sudirman, the then Chief of Staff of the Army, Col Abdul Harris Nasution, through the commanding general of the then 4th Territorial Command Diponegoro, Col Gatot Soebroto, began the process of creating a commando formation to deal with the increasing presence of the DI's military arm the Tentara Islam Indonesia (Islamic Army of Indonesia). Thus was born what would be the basis of the 400th Raider Infantry Battalion - the National Freedom Bull Operational Command (Komando Gerakan Banteng Negara), under Lt Col Sarbini as its first commanding officer, who the following year was succeeded by future Chief of Staff of the Army, then Col Ahmad Yani and assisted by Lt Col Bachrum. The Banteng Raiders, the military part of that operation, were raised as two independent special forces companies and a training company beginning in February 1950 in Tegal, Central Java.

- 1 Company Banteng Raiders (Kompi BR I), with Cpt (INF) Pujadi as commander and with personnel from the 401st Infantry Btn./Rajawali,
- 2 Company Banteng Raiders (Kompi BR II), with Cpt (INF) Yasir Hadibroto as commander and with personnel from the 402nd Infantry Btn. Banteng Loreng
- Battle Training Centre Company (Kompi BTC)

To complement the Raider Companies, by the time the then 454th Infantry Battalion Banteng Raiders was officially raised on 23 March 1953, 4 more companies were formed:

- HQ Company
- 3 Company Banteng Raiders led by Cpt Soegiyono with personnel assigned from the 403rd Infantry Btn./Pendowo
- 4 Company Banteng Raiders led by Cpt Idris with personnel assigned from the 404rd Infantry Btn./Cocor Merah
- 5 Company Banteng Raiders led by 1Lt Ali Moertopo

The battalion's actions from 1954 to 1958 against TII detachments operating in Central Java led to the end of the DI/TII threat to the citizens of the province, leading to the 1954 death of Amir Fatah, the provincial DI/TII commander.

In 1961, the battalion transitioned to being parachute infantry, the first infantry battalion to be designated in the airborne and air assault role in its military region AOR.

In 2003, the battalion completed its transition training in Cilacap and first appeared as a Raider Infantry unit at the Army Day parade.

== See also ==
- Kodam IV/Diponegoro
- Indonesian Army
