= 500th Raider Infantry Battalion =

- Batalyon Infanteri Raider 500/Sikatan
- Founded: 25 October 1945
- Country: Indonesia
- Branch: Indonesian Army
- Type: Raider Infantry
- Garrison/HQ: Jl. Gadjah Mada 1, Surabaya
- Motto: Cepat Senyap Tepat
- Anniversaries: 25 October
- Engagements: Madiun Affair 1948
- Website: www.kodam5-brawijaya.mil.id

Commanders
- Battalion Commander: LTC Yoki Malinton Kurniafi

The 500th Raider Infantry Battalion (Indonesian: Batalyon Infanteri Raider 500/Sikatan) is one of the 42 active Indonesian Army Raider Infantry Battalions. It was established on 25 October 1945. The battalion is one of several Indonesian Army units that are capable of air assault operations. The battalion is based in the city of Surabaya, under the command of the Kodam V/Brawijaya.

== History ==
The Battalion was first formed on 25 October 1945 in Mojokerto, East Java, under the name of 7420th Battalion, during Indonesia's struggle for independence against the Dutch. Two years later, the battalion changed its name to 6010th Battalion, after several companies from East Java were merged. On 4 January 1948, it changed its name again to 131st Infantry Battalion, and nine months later, it changed its name again to 23rd Battalion/Sikatan. The battalion was, in 1948, forward deployed to Madiun in East Java to fight the Communist Party of Indonesia-dominated People's Democratic Front forces in the Madiun Affair.

== Capabilities ==
The Battalion is one of several Indonesian Army units that are capable of carrying air assault operations. The battalion got its capabilities after the training that was held in Situbondo, East Java, where several infantry battalions across Indonesia were involved.
