= Kodam IV/Diponegoro =

Military area command in Java, Indonesia

IV Military Regional Command/Diponegoro
- Komando Daerah Militer IV/Diponegoro
- Coat of Arms and patch worn by Kodam IV/Diponegoro personnel.
- Active: 5 October 1950 – present
- Country: Indonesia
- Branch: Indonesian Army
- Type: Indonesia Regional Military Command
- Size: 1 Division
- Part of: Indonesian Army
- Garrison/HQ: Semarang, Central Java
- Mottos: Sirnaning Yakso, Katon Gapuraning Ratu. Dipo Pratomo Tumbal Negoro (Javanese) "Evil vanishes in front of the truth, and happiness will be achieved. Light and intelligence are the weapons of the state. "
- March: Mars Diponegoro
- Website: www.kodam4.mil.id

Commanders
- Current commander: Maj.Gen. Sudaryanto

KODAM IV/Diponegoro or IV Military Regional Command/Diponegoro (Indonesian: Komando Daerah Militer IV/Diponegoro) is a military area command (effectively a military district) of the Indonesian Army. It covers much of the province of Central Java on the island of Java. It is named after the Java War hero Prince Diponegoro. It appears to have been first established in 1950, and inherited the heritage of the former 3rd Diponegoro Division and other Central Java infantry units. Diponegoro Division personnel have been very significant in the history of the Indonesian Army. Among its early officers was Sarwo Edhie Wibowo, who served as battalion and regimental commander in the division from 1945 to 1953. Former commanders of the division include Soeharto, a former president of Indonesia. Divisional personnel, including Lieutenant Colonel Untung Syamsuri, were involved in the 30 September Movement events of 1965. Former president Susilo Bambang Yudhoyono was also a member of this KODAM when he took command of KOREM 072/Pamungkas at Yogyakarta during his military tenure.

As of 1965, the Diponegoro Division had three infantry brigades, the 4th/Dewa Ratna, 5th/Lukitasari, and 6th/Tri Shakti Balajaya. The headquarters of the 4th is located in Tegal, Central Java, the 5th was in Semarang, Central Java, and 6th was in Solo, Central Java. Among those three, the 4th is the currently active brigade, after the disbanding of the 5th and transfer of the 6th to Kostrad.

== Territorial units ==
Today Kodam IV includes the Military Area Commands – Korem 071/Wijayakusuma at Purwokerto, Korem 073/Makutarama at Salatiga, and Korem 074/Warastratama at Solo, Central Java, as well as the 4th Infantry Brigade at Tegal, Central Java. All Korems are commanded by an army colonel, however, as part of the Army restructuring program, Korem 072/Pamungkas is presently commanded by a brigadier general, stating that it is the only Korem overseeing a whole province.

1. Korem 071/Wijayakusuma (WK) in Purwokerto

- Kodim 0701/Banyumas
- Kodim 0702/Purbalingga
- Kodim 0703/Cilacap
- Kodim 0704/Banjar Negara
- Kodim 0710/Pekalongan
- Kodim 0711/Pemalang
- Kodim 0712/Tegal
- Kodim 0713/Brebes
- Kodim 0736/Batang

2. Korem 073/Makutarama (MKT) in Salatiga

- Kodim 0714/Salatiga
- Kodim 0715/Kendal
- Kodim 0716/Demak
- Kodim 0717/Purwodadi
- Kodim 0718/Pati
- Kodim 0719/Jepara
- Kodim 0720/Rembang
- Kodim 0721/Blora
- Kodim 0722/Kudus

3. Korem 074/Warastratama (WRS) in Surakarta

- Kodim 0723/Klaten
- Kodim 0724/Boyolali
- Kodim 0725/Sragen
- Kodim 0726/Sukoharjo
- Kodim 0727/Karang Anyar
- Kodim 0728/Wonogiri
- Kodim 0735/Surakarta

4. Kodim 0733/Semarang (BS) in Semarang

== Combat Units & Support Combat Units ==
- Combat Units
  - 4th Infantry Brigade/Dewa Ratna
    - Brigade HQ
    - 405th Infantry Battalion/Suryakusuma
    - 406th Infantry Battalion/Candrakusuma
    - 407th Infantry Battalion/Padmakusuma
  - 43th Territorial Infantry Brigade/Muria
    - Brigade HQ
  - 400th Raider Infantry Battalion/Banteng Raider
  - 403rd Infantry Battalion/Wirasada Pratista (under Korem 072)
  - 408th Raider Infantry Battalion/Suhbrasta (under Korem 074)
  - 410th Infantry Battalion/Alugoro (under Korem 073)
- Combat Support Units
  - 2nd Cavalry Battalion/Turangga Ceta (Yonkav 2/Tank)
  - 3rd Field Artillery Battalion/Nagapakca (Yon Armed 3/105 Tarik)
  - 4th Combat Engineer Battalion/Tanpa Kwandaya
