= 21st Division =

21st Division or 21st Infantry Division may refer to:

== Infantry divisions ==
- 21st Division (People's Republic of China)
- 21st Infantry Division (France)
- 21st Division (German Empire)
- 21st Landwehr Division, German Empire
- 21st Reserve Division, German Empire
- 21st Infantry Division (Wehrmacht), Germany
- 21st Parachute Division, Germany
- 21st Waffen Mountain Division of the SS Skanderbeg, Germany
- 21st Mountain Division (India)
- 21st Division (Iran)
- 21st Infantry Division "Granatieri di Sardegna", Kingdom of Italy
- 21st Division (Imperial Japanese Army)
- 21st Division (Philippines)
- 21st Mountain Infantry Division (Poland)
- 21st Infantry Division (Russian Empire)
- 21st Infantry Division (South Korea)
- 21st Division (South Vietnam)
- 21st Guards Motor Rifle Division (Russia)
- 21st Guards Airborne Division, Soviet Union
- 21st Guards Mechanized Division, later the 21st Guards Motor Rifle Division, Soviet Union
- 21st Guards Rifle Division, Soviet Union
- 21st Motor Rifle Division, Soviet Union
- 21st Motor Rifle Division NKVD, Soviet Union
- 21st Rifle Division (Soviet Union)
- 21st Division (Spain)
- 21st Division (United Kingdom)
- 21st Airborne Division, United States deception formation during WWII
- 21st Division (Yugoslav Partisans)

== Cavalry divisions ==
- 21st Cavalry Division, United States

== Armoured divisions ==
- 21st Armoured Division (Egypt), part of the Western Military Region (Egypt)
- 21st Panzer Division, Wehrmacht, Germany
- 21st Guards Tank Division, Soviet Union
- 21st Tank Division (Soviet Union), part of the 54th Army
- 21st Armored Division (United States), a division of the U.S. Army

== Aviation divisions ==
- 21st Air Division, United States
- 21st Aviation Division, Yugoslavia

== See also ==
- 21st Army (disambiguation)
- XXI Corps (disambiguation)
- 21st Brigade (disambiguation)
- 21st Regiment (disambiguation)
- 21st Battalion (disambiguation)
- 21st Squadron (disambiguation)
