= Twenty-first of the month =

Recurring ordinal calendar date

The twenty-first of the month or twenty-first day of the month is the recurring calendar date position corresponding to the day numbered 21 of each month. In the Gregorian calendar (and other calendars that number days sequentially within a month), this day occurs in every month of the year, and therefore occurs twelve times per year.

- Twenty-first of January
- Twenty-first of February
- Twenty-first of March
- Twenty-first of April
- Twenty-first of May
- Twenty-first of June
- Twenty-first of July
- Twenty-first of August
- Twenty-first of September
- Twenty-first of October
- Twenty-first of November
- Twenty-first of December

In addition to these dates, this date occurs in months of many other calendars, such as the Bengali calendar and the Hebrew calendar.

== See also ==
- 21st (disambiguation)
