= O21 =

O21 may refer to:

- O21 (film), a 2014 Pakistani action thriller film
- O 21-class submarine, of the Royal Netherlands Navy
  - HNLMS O 21, a submarine of this class
- O21 scale, a model railway scale
- Otoyol 21, a motorway in Turkey
- Oxygen-21, an isotope of oxygen
- Thomas-Morse O-21, an observation aircraft of the United States Army Air Corps

== See also ==
- 021 (disambiguation), with a zero in place of the letter O
