= 714th Infantry Battalion =

- Batalyon Infanteri 714
- Founded: 24 August 2005
- Country: Indonesia
- Branch: Indonesian Army
- Type: Infantry
- Role: Infantry operations
- Garrison/HQ: Lage, Poso
- Nickname: Yonif 714
- Motto: Sintuwu Maroso
- Engagements: Operation Madago Raya

Insignia
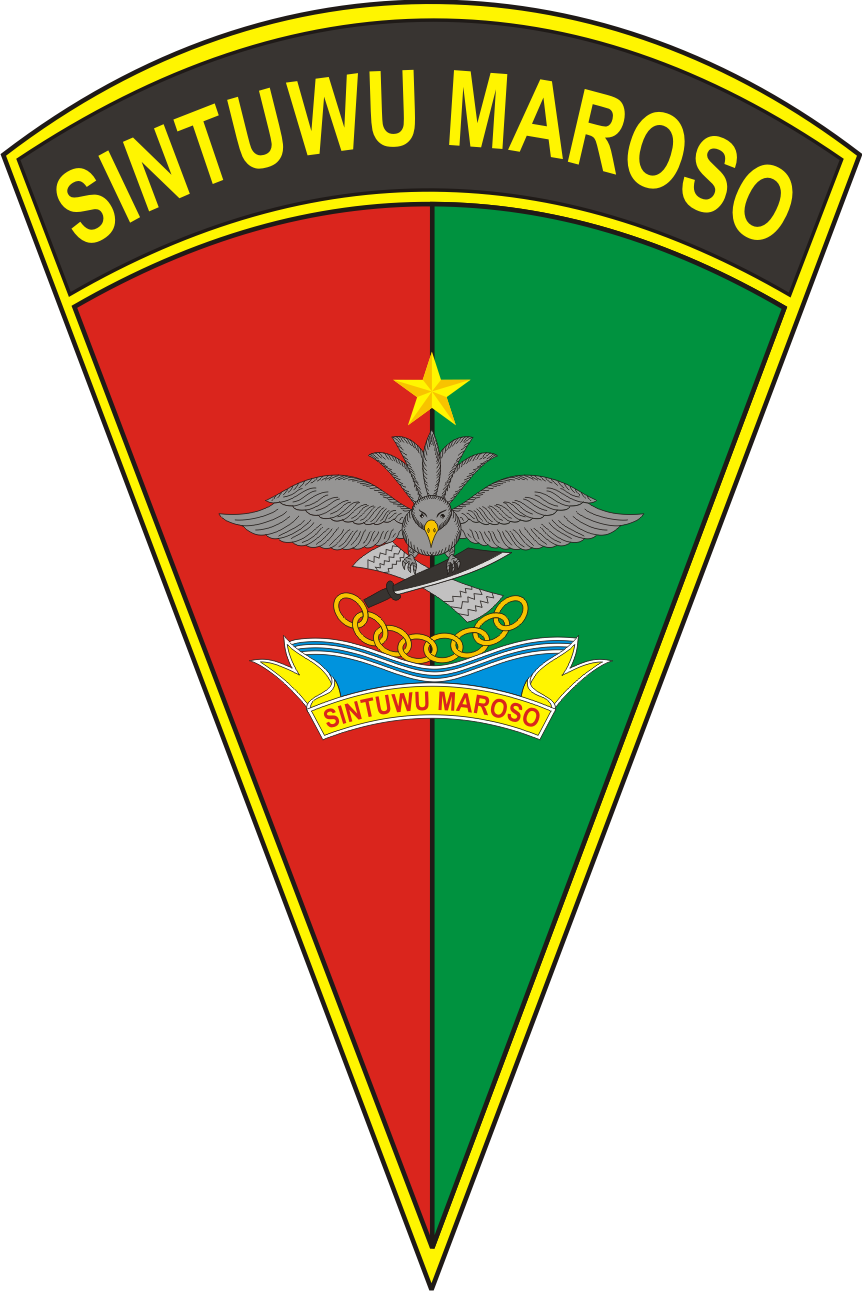
- Identification symbol

714th Infantry Battalion (Indonesian: Batalyon Infanteri 714/Sintuwu Maroso) or locally known as Yonif 714 is an infantry battalion of the Indonesian Army formed in 2004 as a result of the conflict in Poso, Central Sulawesi. The battalion was established by transferring Companies A and B from the 711th Infantry Battalion. It operates under the jurisdiction of the 132nd Military Resort Command of the 23rd Military Regional Command, covering the eastern regencies of Central Sulawesi.

== Organization ==
- Main headquarters is located in Maliwuko, Lage, Poso Regency.
- Support Company (Kiban) is located in Kawua, South Poso Kota, Poso Regency.
- Rifle Company A (Kipan A) is located in Pendolo, South Pamona, Poso Regency.
- Rifle Company B (Kipan B) is located in Molino, East Petasia, North Morowali Regency.
- Rifle Company C (Kipan C) is located in Jole, South Luwuk, Banggai Regency.
- Rifle Company D (Kipan D) is located in Tampabatu, Ampana Tete, Tojo Una-Una Regency.
- Rifle Company E (Kipan E) is located in Kilo, North Poso Pesisir, Poso Regency.
