= Kostrad 2nd Infantry Division =

- Divisi Infanteri 2 Kostrad
- Kostrad 2nd Infantry Division Emblem
- Active: 27 April 1961
- Country: Indonesia
- Branch: Indonesian Army
- Type: Combined arms
- Role: Strategic defense operations
- Part of: Kostrad
- Garrison/HQ: Singosari, Malang, East Java
- Nickname: Divif 2 Kostrad
- Mottos: Sanskrit: Vira Cakti Yudha ("Graced warrior at battlefield")
- Beret color: Green

Commanders
- Division Commander (Panglima Divisi): Maj. Gen. Haryanto
- Chief of staff: Brig. Gen. Primadi Saiful Sulun
- Inspector: Brig. Gen. Eventius Teddy Danarto

Insignia
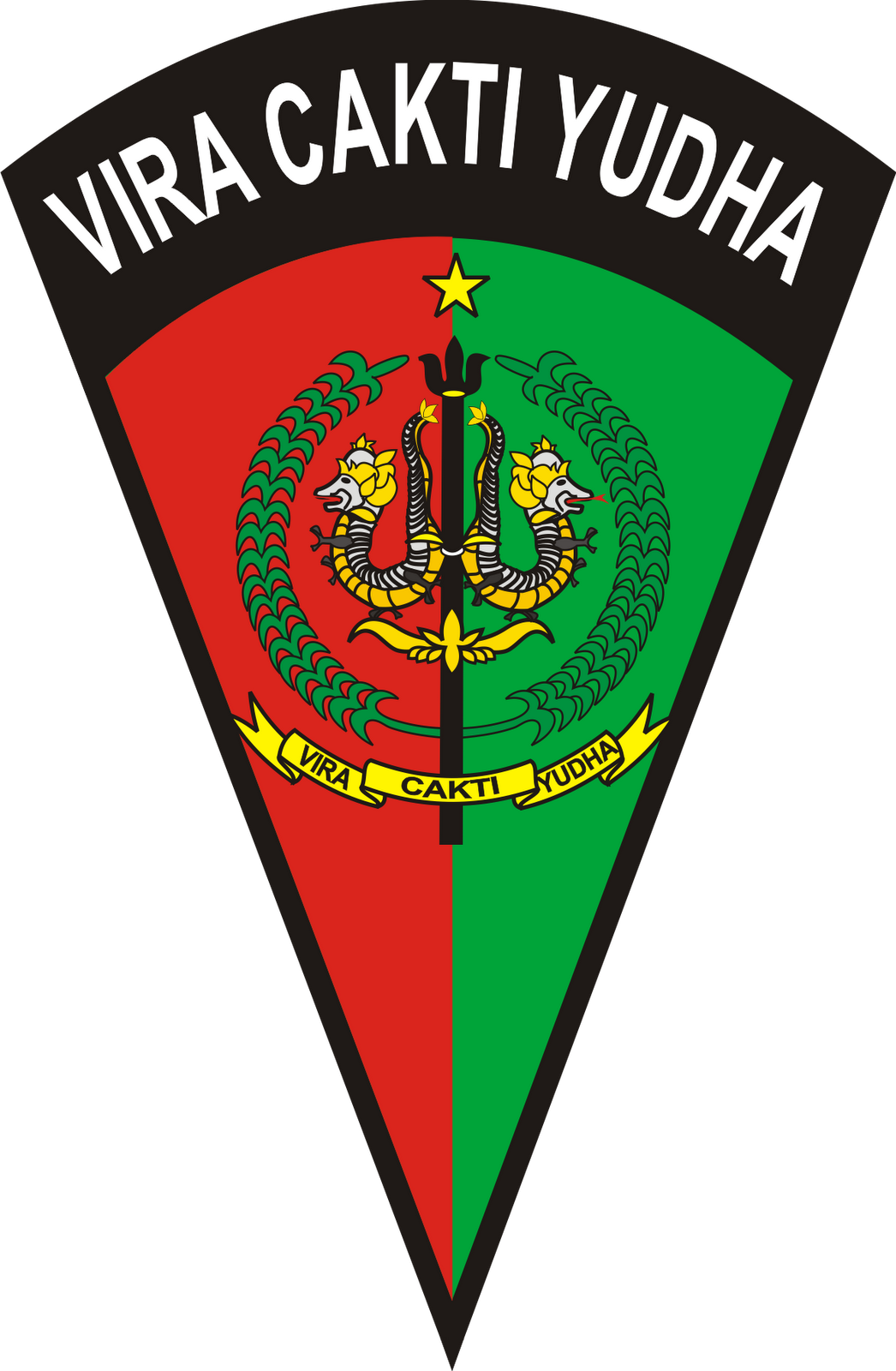
- Divisional SSI (right shoulder)

The 2nd Infantry Division (Indonesian: Divisi Infanteri 2 Kostrad) abbreviated "Divif 2/Kostrad", is an army strategic reserves command division of the Indonesian Army. The divisional commander is a two-star Major General. The division's headquarters are in Malang (East Java).

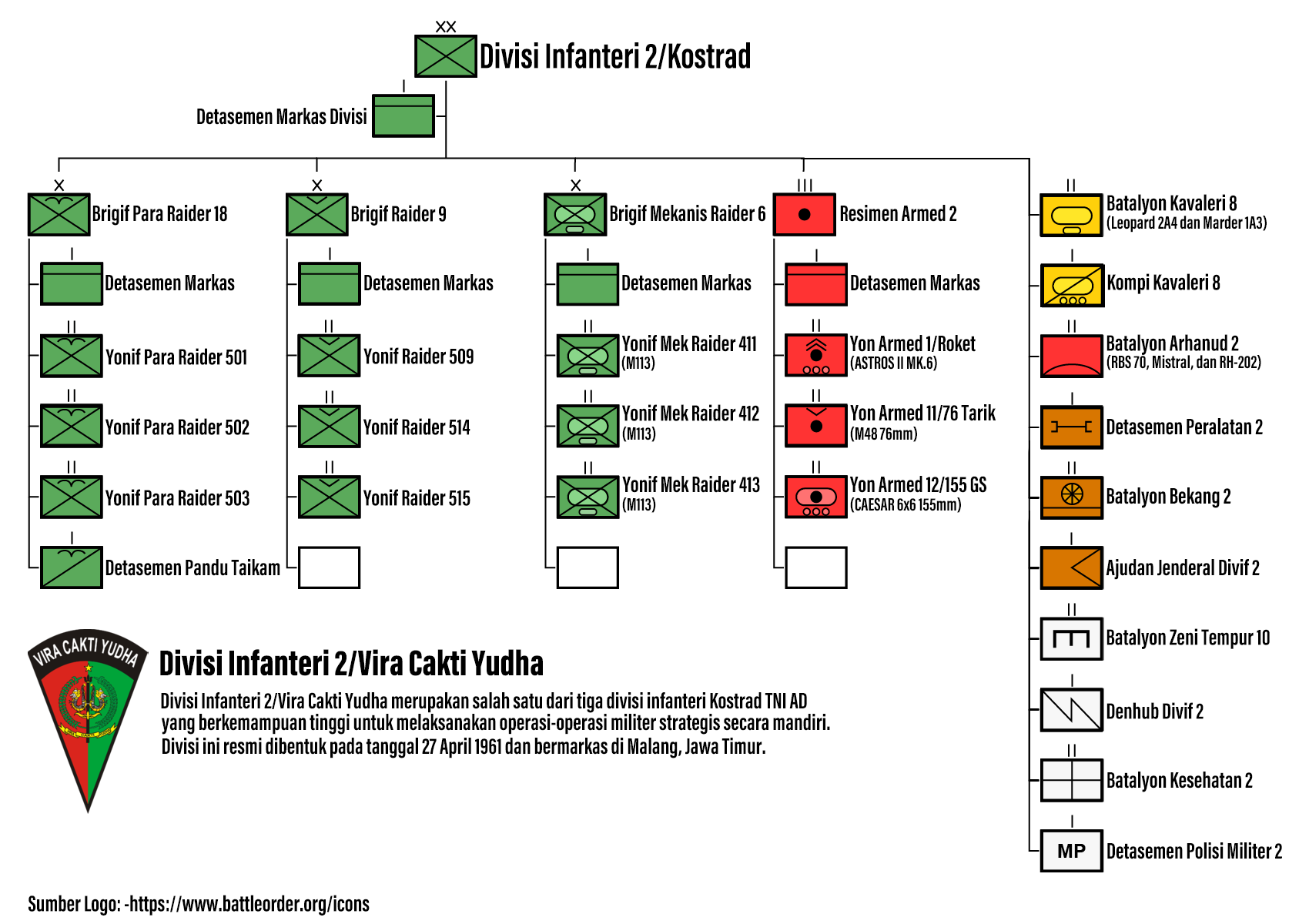
Organization of the 2nd Infantry Division of the Army Strategic Reserve Command

The division contains multiple Army combat units including Infantry (Airborne, Mechanized, and Raider), Cavalry (now can be categorized as Armor units), Artillery, and other support units.

Like the 1st Division, this division is known as a combined arms division part of Kostrad within the Indonesian Army.

The first Kostrad division to be activated, it traces its origins to Decree of Chief of Staff of the Army KPTS 342/4/1961 dated 17 April 1961 by Chief of Staff GEN Abdul Haris Nasution, since then marked as the division's Raising Day.

== Organization ==
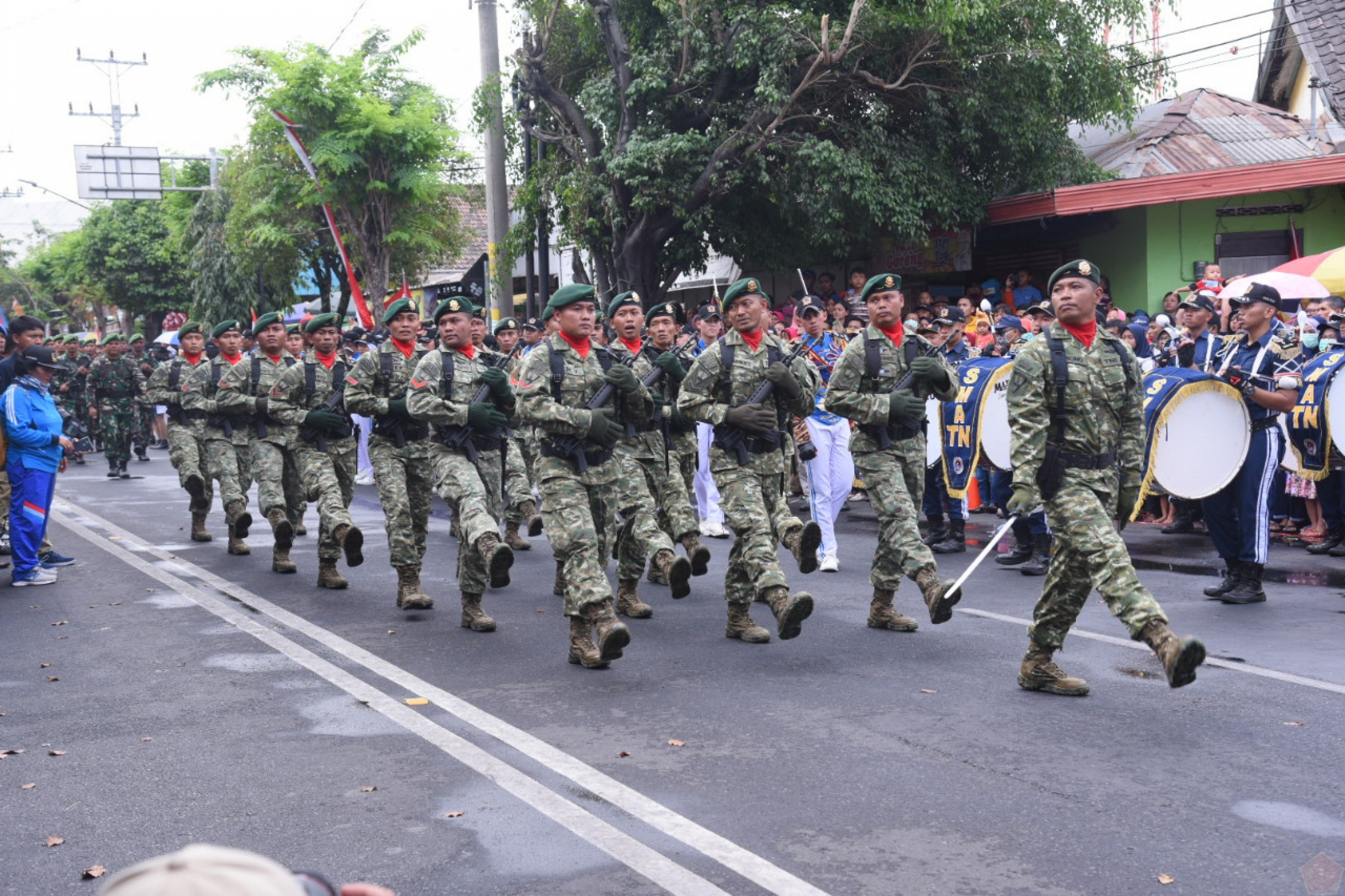
Kostrad 6th Raider Mechanized Infantry Brigade on a parade in Sukoharjo City, 2019

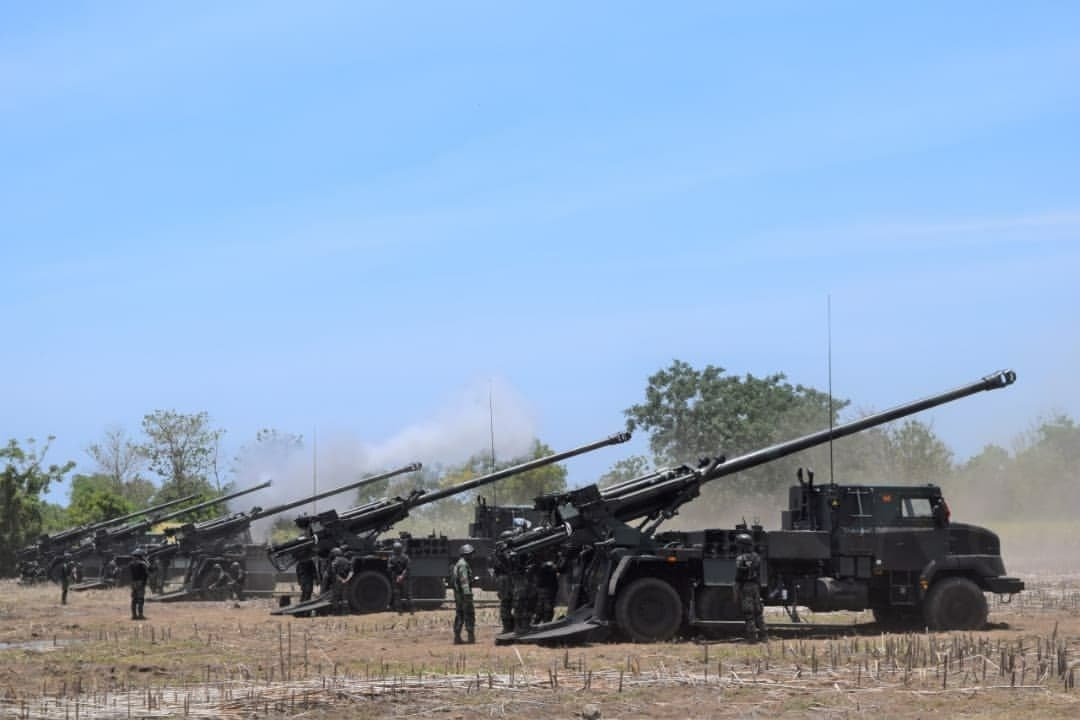
CAESAR battery of the 12th Field Artillery Battalion (Yon Armed 12) Kostrad, 2021

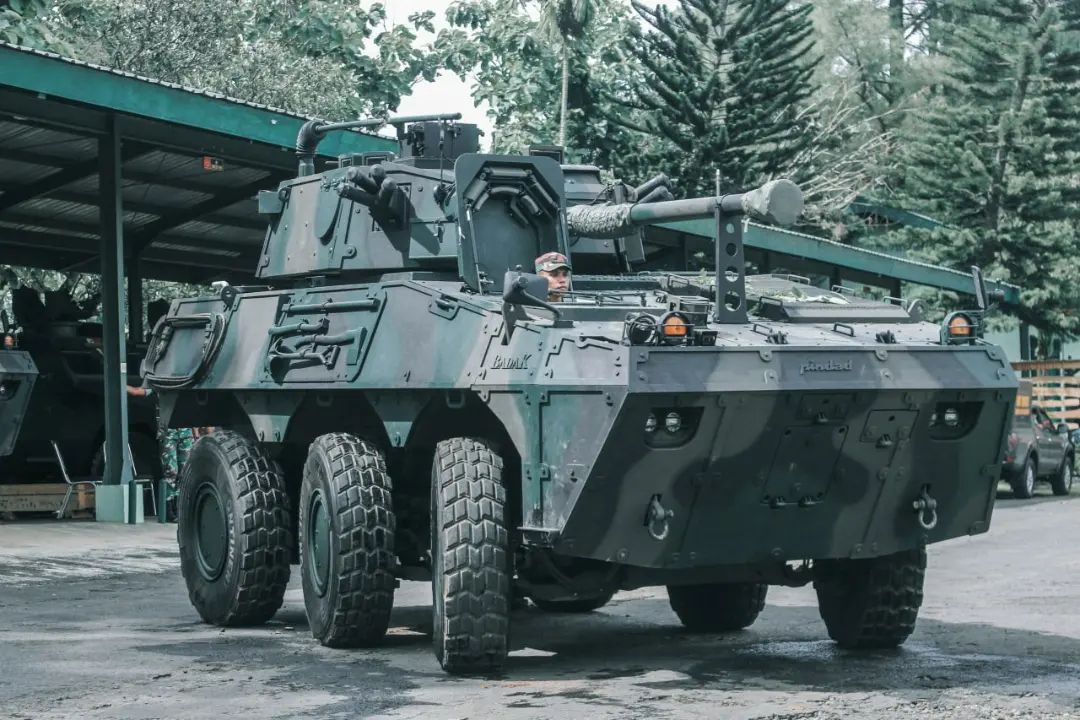
Pindad Badak being accepted by the Kostrad 8th Cavalry Company, 2022

The division is composed of 3 Infantry Brigades, 1 Artillery Regiment and supporting elements including independent Battalion units, and Company.

2nd Infantry Division Command HQ
Regiment/Brigade	Battalion/Detachment/Company Emblem	Battalion/Detachment/Company Name
6th Raider Mechanized Infantry Brigade		411th Raider Mechanized Infantry Battalion
6th Raider Mechanized Infantry Brigade		412th Raider Mechanized Infantry Battalion
6th Raider Mechanized Infantry Brigade		413th Raider Mechanized Infantry Battalion
9th Raider Infantry Brigade		509th Raider Infantry Battalion
9th Raider Infantry Brigade		514th Raider Infantry Battalion
9th Raider Infantry Brigade		515th Raider Infantry Battalion
18th Para Raider Infantry Brigade		501st Para Raider Infantry Battalion
18th Para Raider Infantry Brigade		502nd Para Raider Infantry Battalion
18th Para Raider Infantry Brigade		503rd Para Raider Infantry Battalion
18th Para Raider Infantry Brigade		18th Para Raider Infantry Brigade Security Reconnaissance and Air Scout Detachment
2nd Field Artillery Regiment		1st Field Artillery Battalion
2nd Field Artillery Regiment		11th Field Artillery Battalion
2nd Field Artillery Regiment		12th Field Artillery Battalion
Stand-alone / independent Battalion		2nd Air-Defence Artillery Battalion
Stand-alone / independent Battalion		8th Cavalry Battalion
Stand-alone / independent Battalion		10th Combat Engineer Battalion
Stand-alone / independent Battalion		2nd Supply and Transportation Battalion
Stand-alone / independent Battalion		2nd Medical Battalion
Stand-alone / independent Company		8th Cavalry Company
Detachment		2nd Infantry Division Signal Detachment
Detachment		2nd Infantry Division Ordnance Detachment
Detachment		2nd Infantry Division Military Police Detachment
Administrative Assistance Unit		2nd Infantry Division Adjutant General's Office

== See also ==
- 1st Kostrad Infantry Division
- 3rd Kostrad Infantry Division
