= 11th Field Artillery Battalion =

Indonesian military unit

11th Field Artillery Battalion Yon Armed 11/Guntur Geni
- Founded: 27 June 1962
- Country: Indonesia
- Branch: Kostrad 2nd Infantry Division, Indonesian Army
- Type: Field artillery battalion
- Role: Combat support units
- Garrison/HQ: Jl. Kesatrian Kidul, Magelang, Central Java
- Nickname: Yonarmed 11/GG
- Motto: Guntur Geni
- Equipment: 76 mm mountain gun M48

The 11th Field Artillery Battalion (Indonesian: Batalyon Artileri Medan 11, Yonarmed 11) is a Field artillery battalion of the Indonesian Army. It is part of the 2nd Field Artillery Regiment (Resimen Artileri Medan 2), Kostrad 2nd Infantry Division.

The battalion was established on June 27, 1962, and is located in Magelang, Central Java. It is equipped with the Yugoslavian 76 mm M-48 howitzer.
