= 21st Street =

21st Street may refer to:

- 21st Street (IND Crosstown Line), a station of the New York City Subway serving the G train
- 21st Street (Muni), a station on the San Francisco Municipal Railway light rail network's J Church line
- 21st Street – Queensbridge (IND 63rd Street Line), a station of the New York City Subway serving the F and <F> train
