= 17th Airborne Raider Infantry Brigade =

Indonesian military unit

17th Raider Infantry 17/Kujang I
- Symbol of 17th Raider Infantry Brigade / Kujang I
- Founded: 20 May 1966
- Country: Indonesia
- Branch: Indonesian Army
- Type: Airborne Infantry (Paratrooper)
- Role: Armed Forces Quick Reaction Force
- Motto: Kujang I
- Website: www.brigiflinud17.mil.id

Commanders
- Commander: Colonel Inf. Ade Rony Wijaya
- Kastaf: Letkol Inf. Johindratno Devidanto

The 17th Raider Infantry Brigade / Kujang I (abbreviated The 17th Raider Brigade / Kujang I) is a Brigade level unit in the 1st Kostrad Infantry Division, a branch of the Indonesian Army. The Raiders Brigade consists of three battalions:

1. Airborne Raider Infantry Battalion 305 / Skull (Karawang, West Java)
2. Airborne Raider Infantry Battalion 328 / Dirgahayu (Cilodong, Depok, West Java)
3. Airborne Raider Infantry Battalion 330 / Tri Dharma (Cicalengka, Bandung Regency, West Java).

The unit's Command Headquarters (Mako) "Brigadier Raider 17 / Kujang I" is located in Cijantung, East Jakarta. This brigade was established on May 20, 1966. This unit was previously named the 17th Para Raider Infantry Brigade / Kujang I.
