= Twentyone Lake =

Lake in the state of Minnesota, United States

- Location within Minnesota
- Location: Otter Tail County, Minnesota
- Coordinates: 46°29′49″N 95°58′51″W
- Type: lake

Twentyone Lake is a lake in Otter Tail County, in the U.S. state of Minnesota.

Twentyone Lake was so named from its location in section 21 of the county.

== See also ==
- List of lakes in Minnesota
