= 21st Infantry Brigade (Indonesia) =

- Brigade Infanteri 21/Komodo
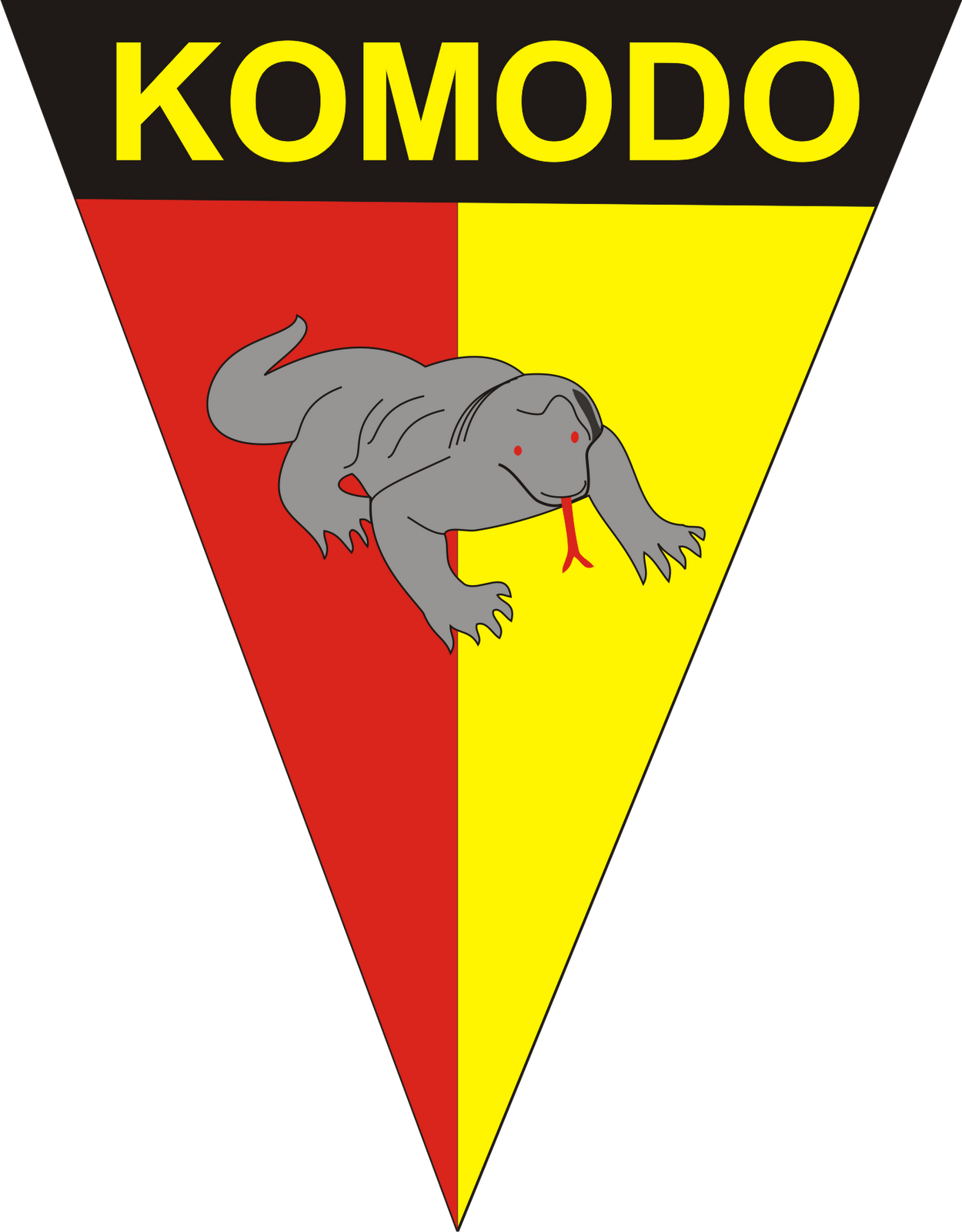
- Logo of the 21st Infantry Brigade
- Founded: 15 December 2009
- Branch: Indonesian Army
- Part of: Kodam Udayana
- Garrison/HQ: Kupang Regency, East Nusa Tenggara

The 21st Infantry Brigade (Indonesian: Brigade Infanteri 21/Komodo) is an infantry brigade of the Indonesian Army. It is part of the Udayana Military Command, and is based from Kupang Regency, East Nusa Tenggara.

== History ==
Plans to create an infantry brigade was part of Udayana's 2005–2009 strategic plan. The brigade was officially formed on 15 December 2009, and its base was officially opened on 17 December. The brigade is headquartered at the town of Oelamasi in Kupang Regency, around 38 kilometres (24 mi) east from Kupang city.

The brigade was extensively deployed in response to flooding in the Kupang area in the aftermath of 2021's Cyclone Seroja, setting up public kitchens and evacuating flood-affected residents.

== Organization ==
The brigade consists of the following units:

- 21st Infantry Brigade
  - 743rd Infantry Battalion – based in Kupang city.
  - 744th Infantry Battalion – based in Belu Regency. Tasked with defense and security of the Indonesia–Timor-Leste border areas.
