= Twenty-first Amendment =

The Twenty-first Amendment or 21st Amendment may refer to the:

- Twenty-first Amendment of the Constitution of India, a 1967 amendment which introduced Sindhi as one of the official languages of India
- Twenty-first Amendment of the Constitution of Ireland, a 2001 amendment that introduced a constitutional ban on the death penalty
- Twenty-first Amendment to the Constitution of Pakistan, a 2015 amendment that established speedy trial military courts for terrorist offenses
- Twenty-first Amendment to the United States Constitution, a 1933 amendment that ended Prohibition
- 21st Amendment Brewery, a brewery in San Leandro, California
