= Area code 021 =

021 is:

- in Brazil, the telephone area code for the city of Rio de Janeiro and surrounding cities (Greater Rio de Janeiro)
- in China, the telephone area code for the city of Shanghai.
- in Indonesia, the area code for the city of Jakarta and surrounding cities.
- in Iran, the telephone area code for the capital city of Tehran.
- in Ireland, the area code for the city of Cork and a surrounding part of County Cork.
- in Libya, the telephone area code for the capital city of Tripoli.
- in Nepal, the Nepal Telecom telephone area code for the district of Morang.
- in New Zealand, the "area code" for cellular phones on the Vodafone network.
- in Pakistan, the telephone area code for the city of Karachi.
- in Serbia, the area code for the city of Novi Sad.
- see Telephone numbers in South Africa.
- in Sweden, the area code for the city of Västerås; see Telephone numbers in Sweden.
- in Switzerland, the area code for the city of Lausanne and surrounding cities.
- in the United Kingdom, the former area code for Birmingham England (changed to 0121 on 16 April 1995).
