= 744th Infantry Battalion =

Indonesian military unit

744th Special Raider Infantry Battalion
- Batalyon Infanteri Raider Khusus 744; Yonif Raider Khusus 744
- Founded: 24 Januari 1978
- Country: Indonesia
- Branch: Indonesian Army
- Type: Raider Infantry
- Role: Infantry operations
- Size: 800 personnel (1 battalion)
- Garrison/HQ: Belu Regency
- Nickname: Yonif 744, Satya Yudha Bhakti
- Engagements: Operation Lotus

Commanders
- Commandant: Lt Col Inf Parada Warta Nusantara Tampubolon

Special Raider Infantry Battalion 744 or 744th Special Raider Infantry Battalion (Indonesian: Yonif Raider Khusus 744/Satya Yudha Bhakti) is a territorial Infantry battalion of the Indonesian Army. It was formerly a part of the 21st Special Raider Infantry Brigade/Komodo Kodam IX/Udayana when East Timor was still part of Indonesia. Established on January 24, 1978, this battalion was headquartered in Los Palos, East Timor, now Timor-Leste.

One of the accomplishments of this battalion was participation in the ambush that killed the President of Fretilin, Nicolau Lobato in January 1979. The raid was conducted jointly with Kopassus troops under the command of future Minister of Defense Prabowo Subianto.

Once out of the Unitary Republic of Indonesia over East Timor, the Battalion and its achievements recorded in operation to the Security Pengacau Movement (GPK) East Timor, its existence is maintained by the (then) Commander of the 9th Military Region Maj. Gen. Kiki Syahnarki. Among its past commanders was a future President of Indonesia, Susilo Bambang Yudhoyono, who served as commanding officer from 1986 to 1988.

Although the 164th Military Area/Wiradharma in East Timor was dissolved along with the loss of East Timor from the Republic of Indonesia, the Battalion was maintained and eventually became part of the 161st Military Area Command/Wirasakti's organic forces at Kupang. Today, it serves as part of the 22nd Infantry Brigade (raised 2009) and is one of the currently 43 Army Raider Infantry Battalions.

== Ambush of Nicolau Lobato ==
744 Infantry Battalion (Yonif 744) then led by Major Yunus Yosfiah was in pursuit of the Fretilin forces in Maubisse Kecil for almost two weeks. Troops involved were the 744th, 700th, and 401st Infantry battalions together with Team-28 from Kopassus.

On December 30, 1978 at 05.00 the Commander of the Nanggala-28 team, Capt. Inf Danyon Prabowo Subianto reported to Major Yunus Yosfiah of the Fretilin troop movements toward the south. Central Sector Commander, Infantry Colonel Tottori Sahala King immediately ordered a siege against the target. Formation of the TNI troops at that time were:

1. Team Nanggala-28 (Kopassus): North side
2. 700th and 401st Infantry battalions: East side
3. 744th Infantry battalions: as the spearhead of the attack

On that day I Platoon Company B, led the 744th Yonif Maudobe Sergeant involved in the gunfire resulted in a number of enemy casualty. Among the dead was Sergeant Maudobe and Nicolau Lobato. The body was successfully recognized by Gutteres two Soldiers (enlisted radio bearer). The pursuit also involved helicopter units.
