= Kostrad 1st Infantry Division =

- Divisi Infanteri 1 Kostrad
- Kostrad 1st Infantry Division
- Active: 22 December 1965
- Country: Indonesia
- Branch: Indonesian Army
- Type: Combined arms
- Role: Strategic defense operations
- Part of: Kostrad
- Garrison/HQ: Cilodong, Depok
- Nickname: Divif 1 Kostrad
- Mottos: Sanskrit: Prakasa Vira Gupti ("Courageous, Gallant, Unseen")
- Beret color: Green

Commanders
- Division Commander (Panglima Divisi): Maj. Gen Rudi Puruwito
- Chief of Staff: Brig. Gen Novi Rubadi Sugito
- Inspector: Brig. Gen Agus Firman Yusmono

Insignia
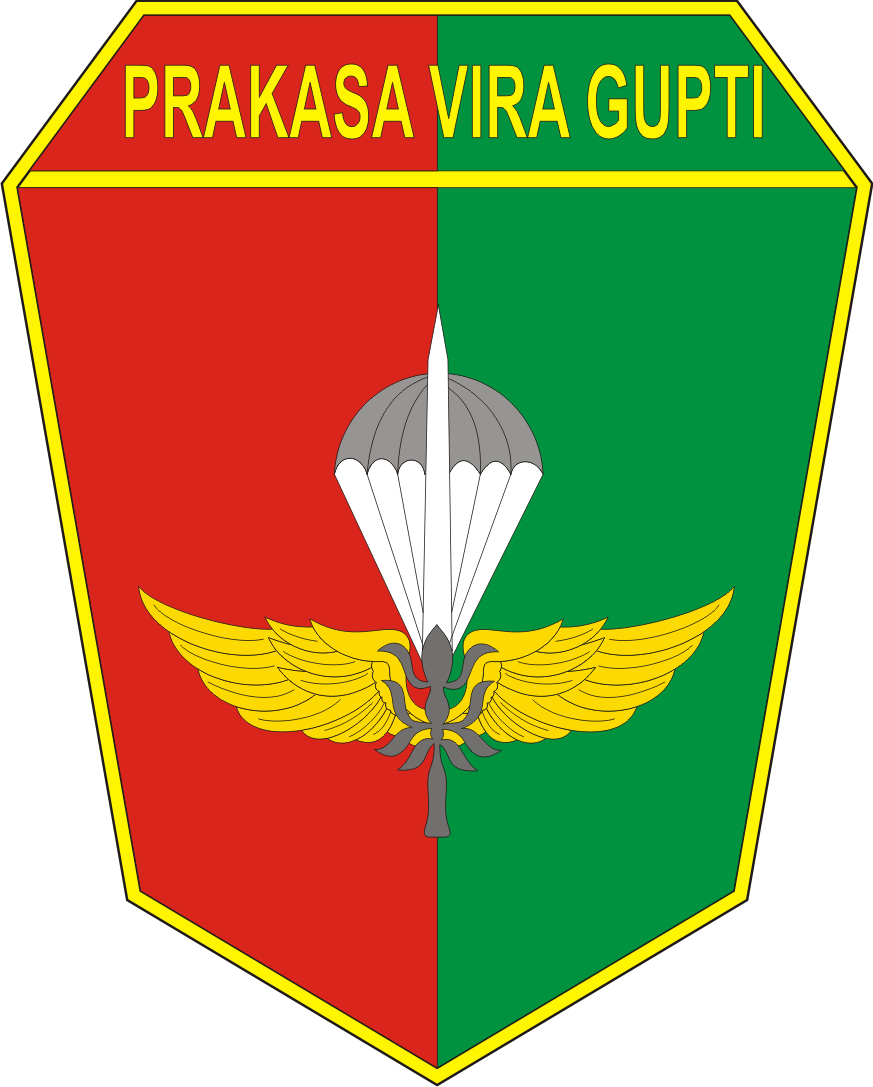
- Divisional SSI (right shoulder)

The 1st Infantry Division (Indonesian: Divisi Infanteri 1 Kostrad) abbreviated "Divif 1/Kostrad", is an army strategic command division of the Indonesian Army. The divisional commander is a two-star major general.

The division was founded on 22 December 1965 as the Airborne Component of the Army Strategic Command (Komando Tempur Lintas Udara Kostrad). The division contains multiple army combat units including infantry (Airborne, Mechanized, and Raider), Cavalry (now can be categorized as Armor units), Artillery, and other support units. It is known as a Combined arms division.

== Organization ==
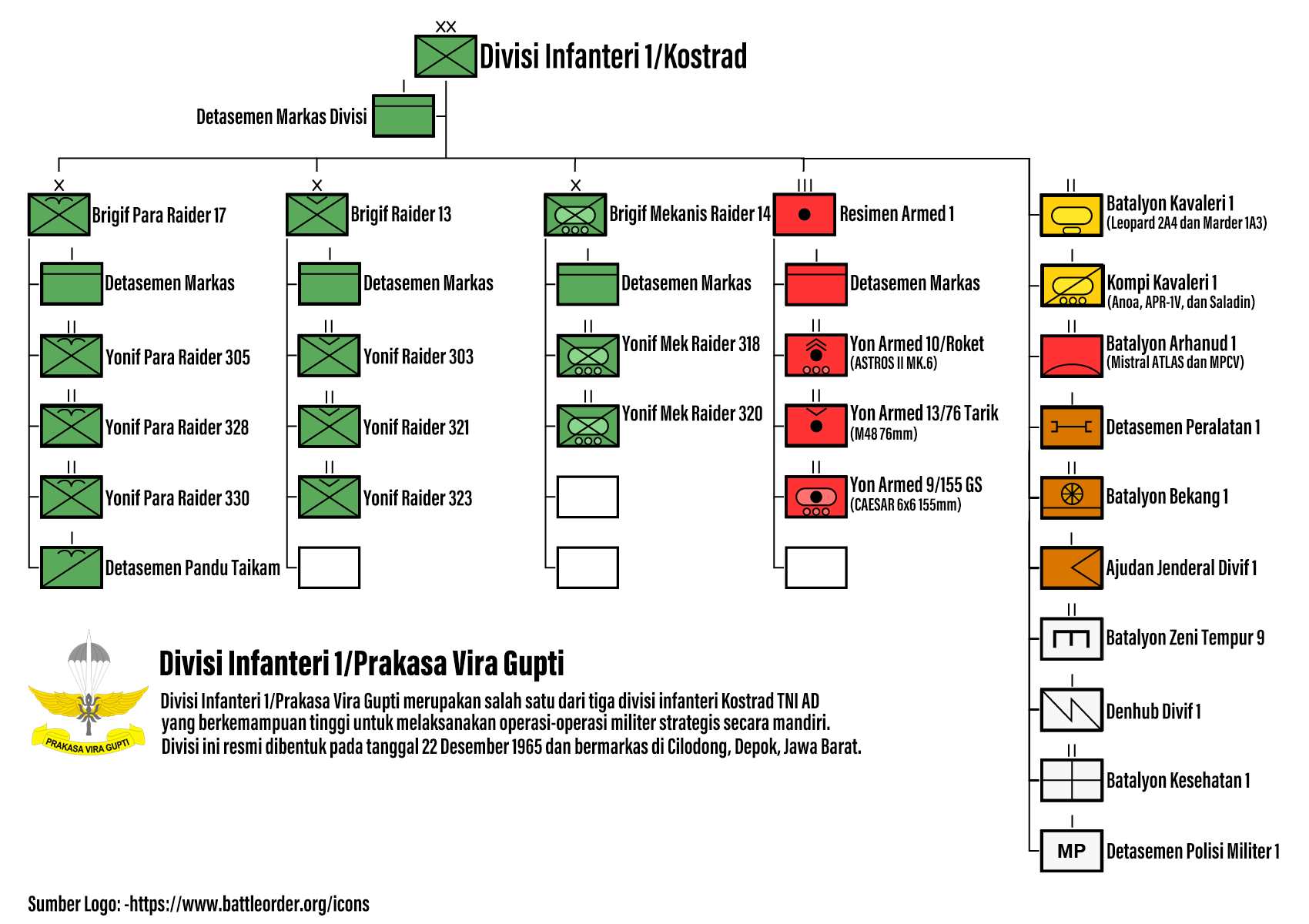
Organization of the 1st Infantry Division of the Army Strategic Reserve Command

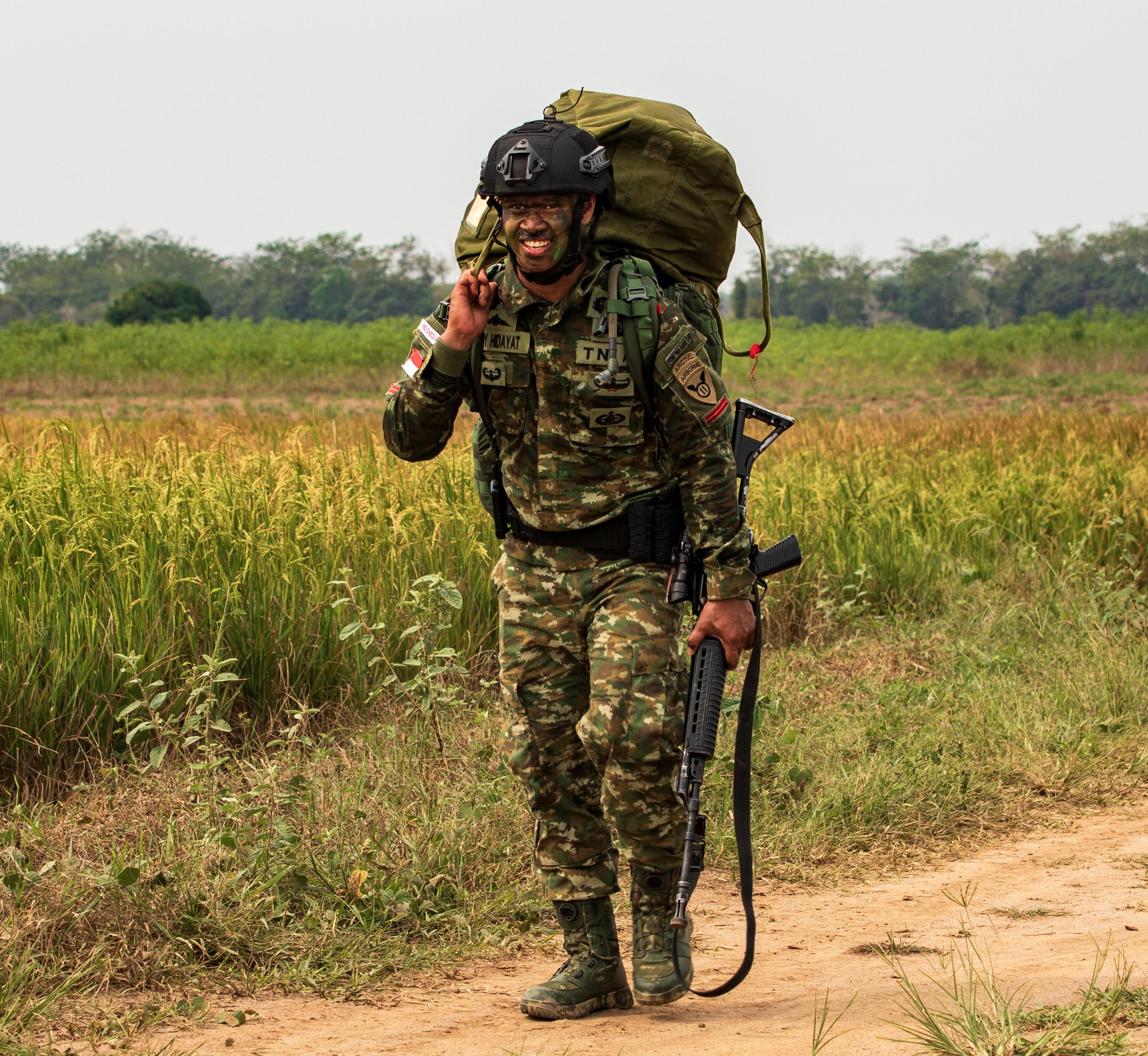
An Indonesian Army paratrooper from 330th Infantry Battalion, 17th Para Raider Infantry Brigade assigned to Kostrad 1st Infantry Division during exercise Super Garuda Shield 2024.

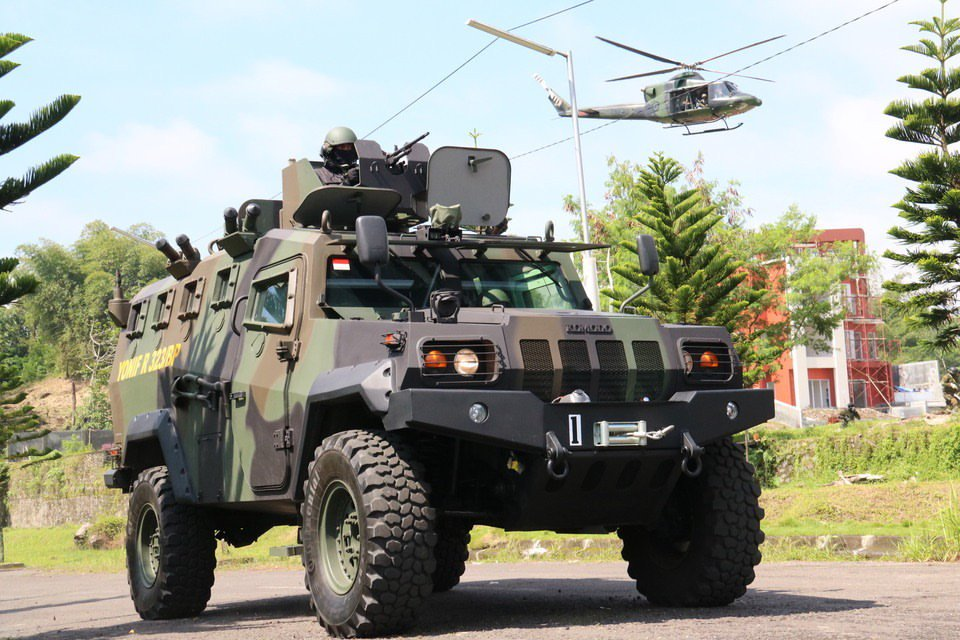
Pindad Komodo of the 323rd Raider Infantry Battalion

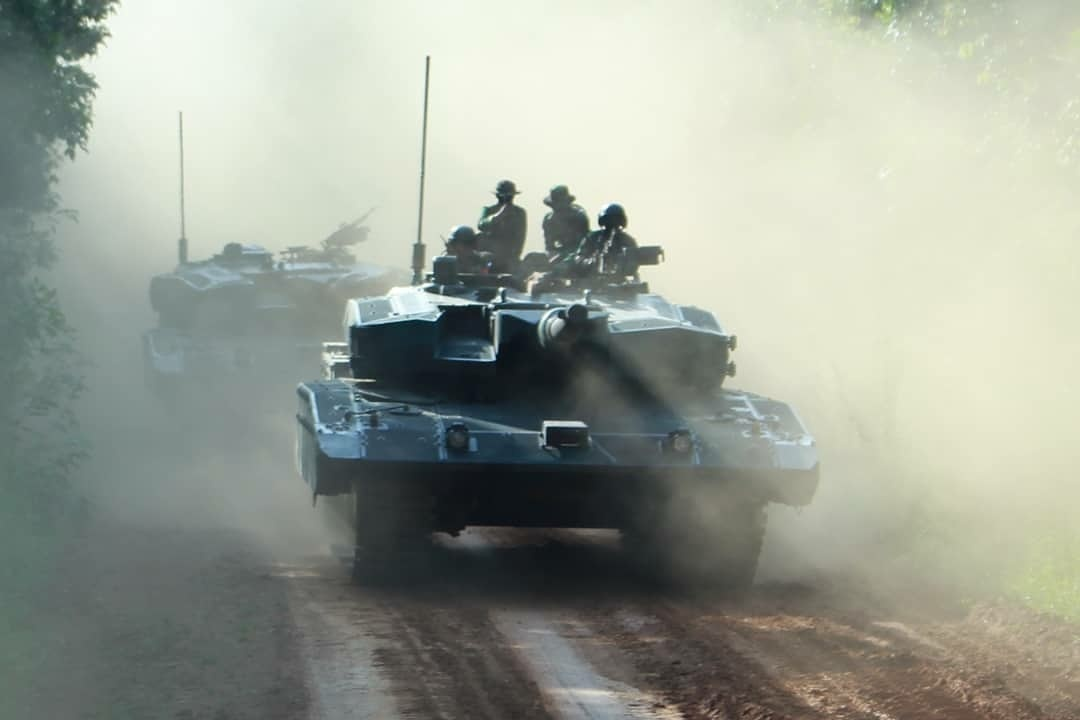
Soldiers of the 1st Cavalry Battalion (Yonkav) Kostrad carry out platoon-level Tactical Training activities in the Baturaja Combat Training Center area, South Sumatra.

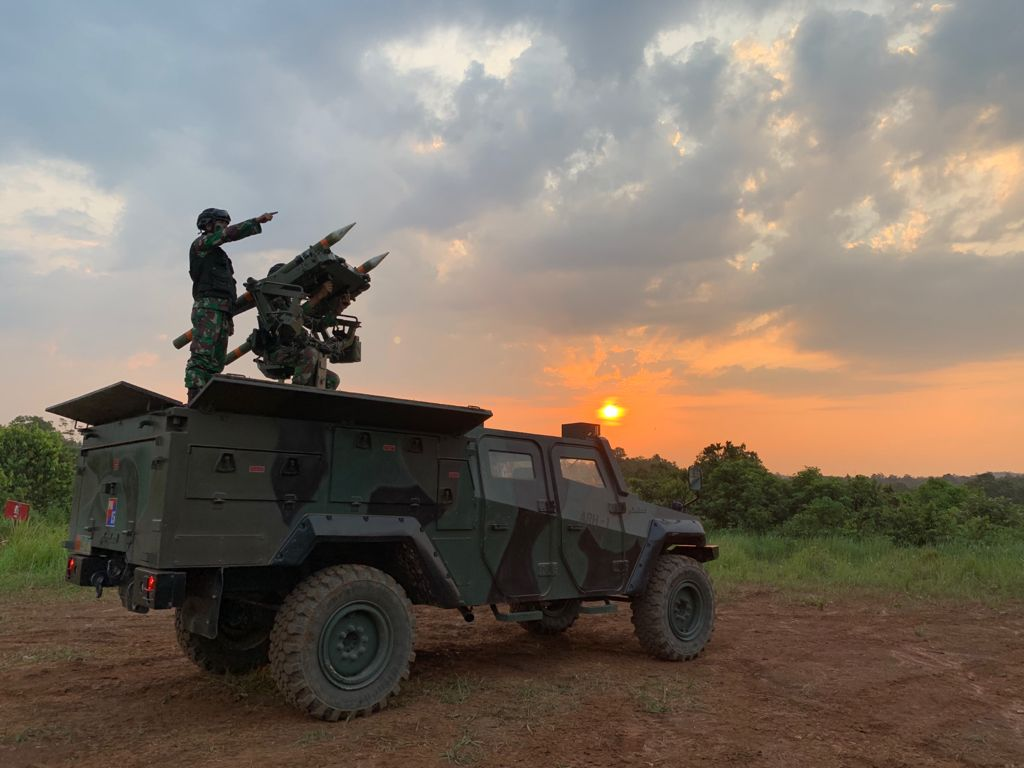
1st Air Defence Battalion with Mistral Atlas SAM system

The division is composed of 3 Infantry Brigades, 1 Artillery Regiment and supporting elements including independent Battalion units, and Companies under the division ORBAT. The 3rd Para Raider Infantry Brigade was part of the Kostrad 1st Infantry Division but was later moved to a new division known as the Kostrad 3rd Infantry Division based on the Decree of the President of the Republic of Indonesia Number 12 of 2018 dated May 8, 2018.

The 1st Battalion Combat Team, raised 2017, was transformed into the basis of a 3rd mechanized brigade - the 14th Mechanized Raider Infantry Brigade - effective 17 November 2022.

1st Infantry Division Command HQ
Regiment/Brigade	Battalion/Detachment/Company Emblem	Battalion/Detachment/Company Name
17th Para Raider Infantry Brigade		17th Para Raider Infantry Brigade Headquarters Detachment
17th Para Raider Infantry Brigade		305th Para Raider Infantry Battalion
17th Para Raider Infantry Brigade		328th Para Raider Infantry Battalion
17th Para Raider Infantry Brigade		330th Para Raider Infantry Battalion
17th Para Raider Infantry Brigade		17th Para Raider Infantry Brigade Security Reconnaissance and Air Scout Detachment
13th Raider Infantry Brigade		303rd Raider Infantry Battalion
13th Raider Infantry Brigade		321st Raider Infantry Battalion
13th Raider Infantry Brigade		323rd Raider Infantry Battalion
14th Raider Mechanized Infantry Brigade		318th Raider Mechanized Infantry Battalion
14th Raider Mechanized Infantry Brigade		320th Raider Mechanized Infantry Battalion
1st Field Artillery Regiment		9th Field Artillery Battalion
1st Field Artillery Regiment		10th Field Artillery Battalion
1st Field Artillery Regiment		13th Field Artillery Battalion
Stand-alone / independent Battalion		1st Air-Defence Artillery Battalion
Stand-alone / independent Battalion		1st Cavalry Battalion
Stand-alone / independent Battalion		9th Combat Engineer Battalion
Stand-alone / independent Battalion		1st Supply and Transportation Battalion
Stand-alone / independent Battalion		1st Medical Battalion
Stand-alone / independent Company		1st Cavalry Company
Detachment		1st Infantry Division Signal Detachment
Detachment		1st Infantry Division Ordnance Detachment
Detachment		1st Infantry Division Military Police Detachment
Administrative Assistance Unit		1st Infantry Division Adjutant General's Office

== See also ==
- 2nd Kostrad Infantry Division
- 3rd Kostrad Infantry Division
