= Untung Syamsuri =

Indonesian coup leader (1926–1967)

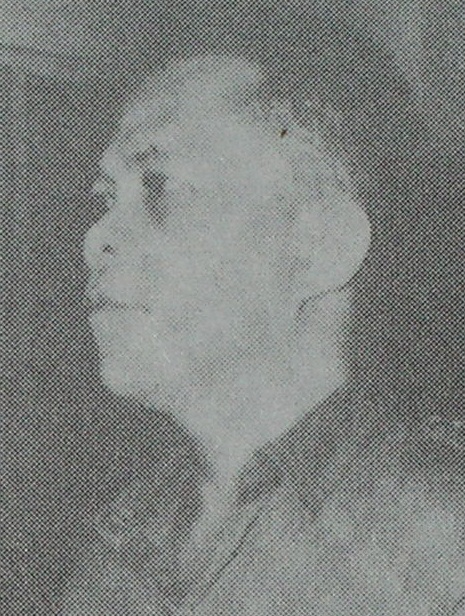
Untung at his trial in Jakarta in 1966

Lieutenant Colonel Untung bin Syamsuri (Sruni, Kebumen, Central Java, 3 July 1926 – September 1967) was one of the leaders of the 1965 coup attempt in Indonesia known as the 30 September Movement.

A career soldier, Untung was the first officer parachuted into Western New Guinea in 1962 at the start of President Sukarno's efforts to expel the Dutch forces who still controlled it. As a result of his actions, he was promoted to lieutenant colonel and awarded a medal. In West Papua, and later in the Diponegoro Division in Central Java, Untung served with future president Suharto, who attended Untung's wedding in 1964.

In early 1965, Untung was transferred to the Tjakrabirawa Regiment, the Presidential Guard, and commanded one of its four foot guard battalions. He was put in charge of arrangements for the Armed Forces Day Parade to be held on 5 October. Being the 20th anniversary of the Indonesian National Armed Forces, Sukarno had ordered a special event. For the day, a full infantry combat brigade was moved from East and Central Java and into Jakarta including three battalions of infantry, one of tanks, one of armoured vehicles, a mortar battalion, an anti-aircraft battalion and an engineers' battalion. On the morning of 1 October 1965, troops had surrounded Merdeka Square in central Jakarta in support of the 30 September movement, but Untung was at Halim Perdanakusuma Air Force Base along with other leaders of the movement, including D. N. Aidit, leader of the Communist Party of Indonesia. However, he was named as leader of the 30 September movement in radio broadcasts made by the group from the Indonesian State Radio building on Merdeka Square. Roosa's version of events which claim D.N. Aidit's involvement in the 30 September movement are highly contested and there is no conclusive evidence of this. The theory presented by Ruth McVey and Benedict Anderson contradicts Roosa's claim which is built entirely on circumstantial evidence.

When the coup attempt failed, Untung and the other leaders left Halim. Untung was captured near Tegal, Central Java in October. He was tried by the Special Military Court (Mahmillub). He denied he was a member of the Communist Party and insisted that he had acted on his own initiative. He was sentenced to death and executed in September 1967.

Lt Gen Ahmad Yani, who was killed by the troops of the 30 September Movement, had been Untung's commanding officer when they served in a raider unit. Brigadier General (then Colonel) Sarwo Edhie Wibowo, commander of the RPKAD para-commando regiment, which played a key role in quashing the coup attempt had been responsible for Untung's paratrooper training. Brigadier General, Kemal Idris, whose troops crushed the coup attempt in northern Sumatra as commandant of Kodam I/Bukit Barisan, was a guest at Untung's wedding.
