= 21st Brigade =

In military terms, 21st Brigade may refer to:

== Australia ==
- 21st Brigade (Australia)

== Germany ==
- 21st Panzer Brigade (Bundeswehr)
- 21st Panzer Brigade (Wehrmacht)

== Greece ==
- 21st Armoured Brigade (Greece)
- 21st Brigade (Greece), an infantry brigade

== India ==
- 21st Indian Infantry Brigade
- 21st (Bareilly) Brigade

== Indonesia ==
- 21st Infantry Brigade (Indonesia)

== Japan ==
- 21st Independent Mixed Brigade (Imperial Japanese Army)

== Namibia ==
- 21 Motorised Infantry Brigade (Namibia)

== Poland ==
- Polish 21st Podhale Rifles Brigade

== Russia ==
- 21st Separate Guards Motor Rifle Brigade

== Soviet Union ==
- 21st Air Assault Brigade (Soviet Union)
- 21st Missile Brigade

== Ukraine ==
- 21st Mechanized Brigade (Ukraine)
- 21st Public Order Brigade (Ukraine)

== United Kingdom ==
- 21st Army Tank Brigade (United Kingdom)
- 21st Brigade (United Kingdom)
- 21st (East Africa) Infantry Brigade
- 21st Mounted Brigade
- 21st Reserve Brigade
- 21st Brigade, Royal Field Artillery

== United States ==
- 21st Cavalry Brigade
- 21st Signal Brigade

== See also ==
- 21st Division (disambiguation)
- 21st Regiment (disambiguation)
- 21 Squadron (disambiguation)
