= Kodam IX/Udayana =

IX Military Regional Command/Udayana
- Komando Daerah Militer IX/Udayana
- Coat of arms Kodam IX/Udayana
- Active: 27 May 1957 – present
- Country: Indonesia
- Branch: Indonesian Army
- Type: Military Regional Command
- Part of: Indonesian National Armed Forces
- Headquarters: Denpasar, Bali
- Mottos: Praja Raksaka "Defender and protector of the people"
- Engagements: Indonesian occupation of East Timor
- Website: www.kodam-udayana.mil.id

Commanders
- Commander: Maj.Gen. Putra Widiastawa

Kodam IX/Udayana (IX Military Regional Command/Udayana) is a military regional command of the Indonesian Army which is responsible for the Lesser Sunda Islands. It was established as part of the 1985 reorganisation of the Indonesian National Armed Forces (TNI) and included East Timor until that province achieved independence in 1999.

== History ==
Between 1969 and 1985, Kodam XVI Udayana was responsible for Bali, East Nusa Tenggara and West Nusa Tenggara while Kodam IX administered units in East Kalimantan. As part of a broad reorganisation of the TNI in 1985, the number of Kodam was reduced from sixteen to ten, with all of the Indonesian portion of Borneo (Kalimantan) coming under Kodam VI/Tanjungpura and Kodam XVI, which by this time included East Timor, being redesignated Kodam IX.

In 1997, combat units included five infantry battalions, a cavalry troop in East Timor, and an engineer battalion. District commands included Korem 161 (HQ Kupang), Korem 162 (HQ Mataram), Korem 163 (HQ Denpasar), and Korem 164 (HQ Dili). SOF magazine reported forces in East Timor in September 1997 as ten battalions; eight rotationary, two permanent (744th and 745th Battalions), special 'ranger-style' companies, and Detachment 81 of Kopassus.

East Timor continued to fall within Kodam IX's area of responsibility in 1999, with the military units in the province itself coming under the sub-regional command Korem 164/Wiradharma. In July of that year Kodam IX developed plans for Operation Pull-Out ('Operasi Cabut') which was to be executed alongside a plan developed by the TNI Headquarters ('Contingency Plan 1999-2000') if the East Timorese voted for independence in the East Timor popular consultation. After this eventuated, these plans were executed in September and involved the rapid evacuation of 70,000 Indonesian administrators and soldiers and 180,000 East Timorese, which contributed to the 1999 East Timorese crisis. The plans do not prove that the TNI planned the post-referendum violence, however.

After East Timor achieved independence, Kodam IX retained responsibility for Bali, East Nusa Tenggara and West Nusa Tenggara. In 2002 the Border Security Task Force, monitoring the border with East Timor, was reported to include a headquarters drawn from the 3rd Airborne Infantry Brigade (id:Brigade infanteri lintas udara 3), 321 Battalion (Kostrad) in the northern border sector, 721 Battalion in the southern sector, and a detachment from 407 Battalion around Oecussi.

Battalions include Battalion 744. In 2009–2010 a new infantry brigade was formed in West Timor, the 21st Brigade (id:Brigade infanteri 21). Its task appears to be control of the border between West Timor and East Timor. Relations with the East Timor Police Service on the border are cordial and informal, but appear to lack formalised discussion mechanisms for any border incidents that might arise.

== Territorial Command ==
- Korem 163/Wira Satya

- Kodim 1609/Buleleng
- Kodim 1610/Klungkung
- Kodim 1611/Badung
- Kodim 1616/Gianyar
- Kodim 1617/Jembrana
- Kodim 1619/Tabanan
- Kodim 1623/Karangasem
- Kodim 1626/Bangli

== Combat Units & Support Combat Units ==
- 900th Raider Infantry Battalion/Satya Bhakti Wirottama
- 741st Mechanized Infantry Battalion/Garuda Nusantara
- 18th Combat Engineering Battalion/Yudha Karya Raksaka
- 4th Cavalry Detachment/Shima Pasupati

== Training units ==
The Training Units in Kodam IX/Udayana are organised under the Kodam IX/Udayana Training Regiment/Resimen Induk Kodam IX/Udayana (Rindam IX/Udayana). The units are:

- Regiment HQ
- Satuan Dodik Latpur (Combat Training Command Unit)
- Satuan Dodik Kejuruan (Specialist Training Command Unit)
- Sekolah Calon Bintara (Non-Commissioned Officer Training School)
- Sekolah Calon Tamtama (Enlisted Training School)
- Sekolah Dodik Bela Negara (National Defence Training Command Unit)

== Support units ==
The other support units are:

- Military Police Command (Pomdam IX/Udayana)
- Public Relations (Pendam IX/Udayana)
- Adjutant's General Corps (Ajendam IX/Udayana)
- Medical Department (Kesdam IX/Udayana)
- Military Physical (Jasdam IX/Udayana)
- Veterans and National Reserves Administration (Babiminvetcadam IX/Udayana)
- Topography Service (Topdam IX/Udayana)
- Chaplaincy Corps (Bintaldam IX/Udayana)
- Finance Office (Kudam IX/Udayana)
- Legal Affairs (Kumdam IX/Udayana)
- Service Detachment (Denmadam IX/Udayana)
- Information and Data Center (Infolahtadam IX/Udayana)
- Supply (Bekangdam IX/Udayana)
- Transport Corps (Hubdam IX/Udayana)
- Ordnance Department (Paldam IX/Udayana)
- Engineers Command (Zidam IX/Udayana)
- Signals Corps (Sandidam IX/Udayana)
- Intelligence Command (Inteldam IX/Udayana)

== See also ==
- Indonesian Army
