= 21st Cavalry Brigade =

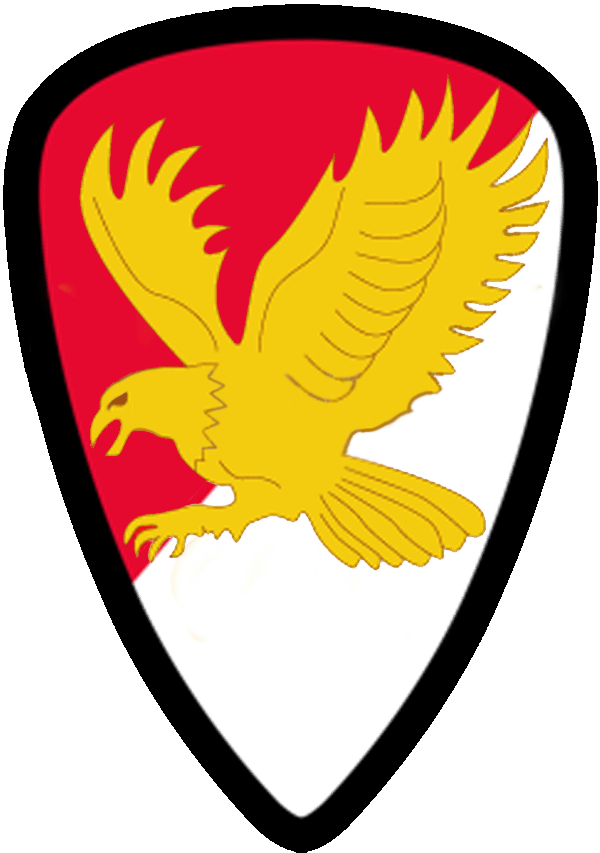
- Active: July 14, 1984 (as AH-64 Task Force) - April 2015
- Country: United States
- Branch: Army
- Type: Aviation
- Size: Brigade
- Garrison/HQ: Ft. Hood, Texas
- Motto: "Impetum Persequi" (to continue the attack)

Insignia
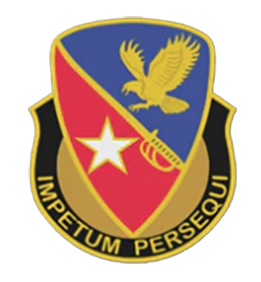
- 21st Cavalry Brigade DUI

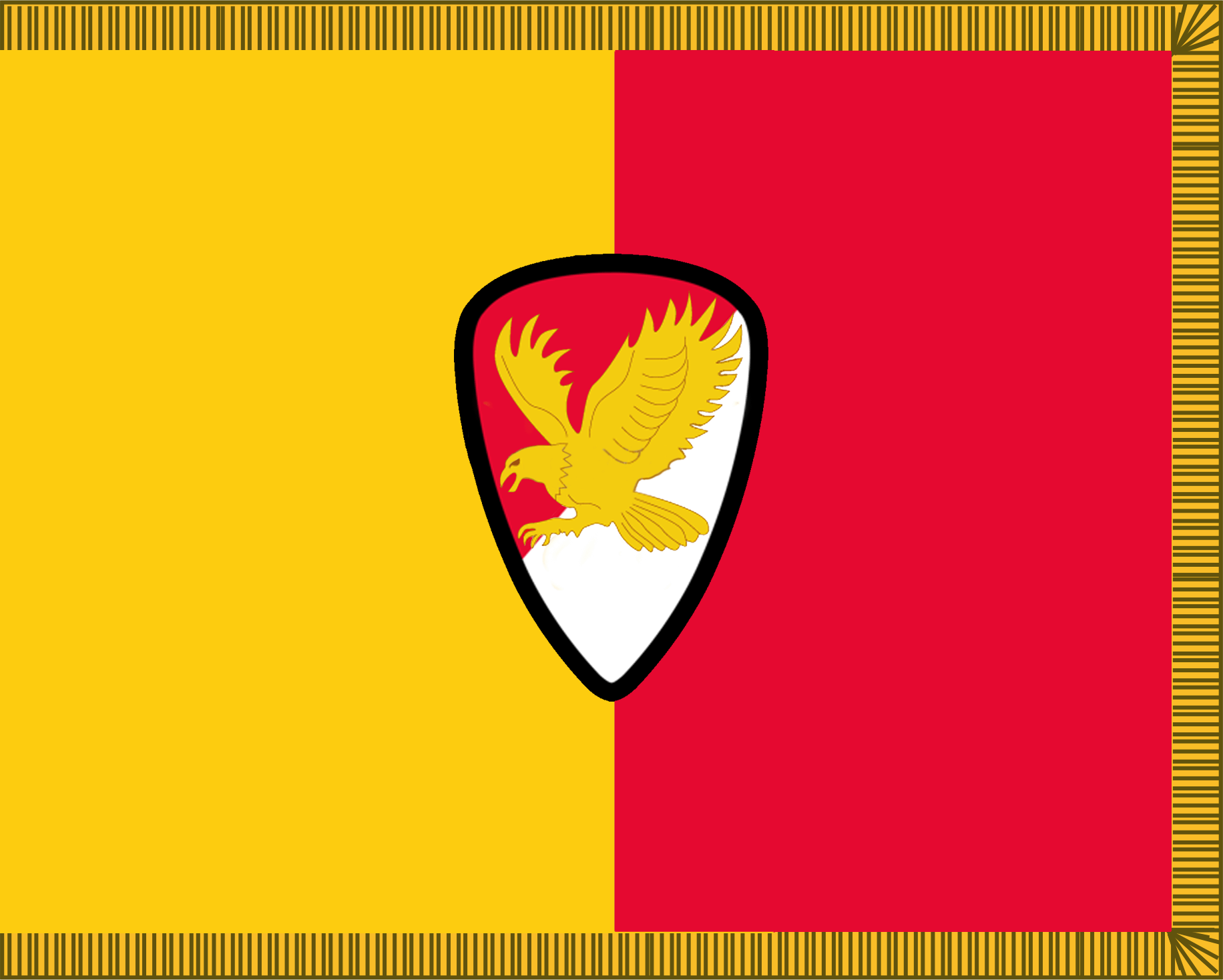
- 21st Cavalry Brigade Flag

Aircraft flown
- Attack helicopter: AH-64 Apache; AH-64D Longbow
- Observation helicopter: OH-58D Kiowa

The 21st Cavalry Brigade began on July 14, 1984, as the AH-64 Task Force (a part of the 6th Cavalry Brigade) to train and equip pilots with the new AH-64 Apache attack helicopter. On January 15, 1985, the task force became the Apache Fielding Brigade and the unit continued their previous mission outside of the 6th Cavalry Brigade. On August 21, 1986, the unit became the Apache Training Brigade. Their first commander was Col. Malvin Handy. Col. Handy and his new unit, trained the first eight Apache battalions in the US Army. In 1992, the brigade became the US Army Combat Aviation Training Brigade and added OH-58D Kiowa helicopters to their mission. Finally in 1996, the brigade became the 21st Cavalry Brigade (Air Combat) and deployed the new AH-64D Longbow version of the Apache. In April 2015 the unit was deactivated under its final commander, Col. John White.

Shoulder Sleeve Insignia was a rounded heater shield divided in red and white colors and a black border. On the shield is a gold eagle with wings open in flight. The shoulder sleeve insignia was approved on 11 April 1997.

Distinctive Unit Insignia was a gold and black metal device with a rounded heater shield divided red and blue with a gold cavalry saber on the dividing line. Above is the gold eagle and below a white star with a gold border. Below is a black scroll with the motto "Impetum Persequi" (to continue the attack).
