= 21st Mountain Division (India) =

- Formation Sign of the 21st Mountain Division
- Active: 1943 – present
- Country: (British Raj) British India; India
- Allegiance: British Empire; India
- Branch: British Indian Army; Indian Army
- Type: Mountain
- Size: Division
- Garrison/HQ: Rangiya, Assam

The 21st Mountain Division is a division of the Indian Army raised in 1943 during the Second World War.

== History ==
The Formation was raised as 21 Indian Infantry Division at Secunderabad on 03 Apr 1943 and subsequently employed under Gen William Slim's 14th Army during 'Reconquest of Burma'. The Formation was demobilised on 10 Aug 1944 and re-raised as 21 Mountain Division on 01 Jul 1976, at Rangia. In Dec 1987, the Formation moved to Tenga as part of forward posture in Kameng Sector and remained there till 1990.

Since 1990, the Formation was deployed in CI/ CT Ops as part of OP BAJRANG, OP RHINO-I, OP RHINO-II and 'OP RHINO (E)'. Successful conduct of CI/ CT operations resulted in ULFA announcing a unilateral ceasefire in Jan 1992 and signing of Bodo Agreements in 1993, 2003 and 2020. During the course, the Division HQ moved to Umroi in Dec 2016 and was again re-located to Rangia in Mar 2018.

The division is known as the Red Horns Division, because of its insignia. Despite a proposal to move the division to Meghalaya in 2010, it remains based in Rangiya, Assam. It forms part of IV Corps.

== See also ==
- IV Corps (India)
- Eastern Command (India)
