= 21st Regiment =

21st Regiment may refer to:

== Infantry regiments ==
- 21 Special Air Service Regiment (Artists) (Reserve), a unit of the British Army
- 21st Foot, a former regiment of the British Army
- 21st Infantry Regiment (Thailand), a unit of the Royal Thai Army
- 21st Infantry Regiment (United States), a unit of the United States Army
- 21st Punjabis, a unit of the British Indian Army
- 21st Marine Infantry Regiment, a unit of the French Marines
- 21st Marine Regiment (United States), a unit of the United States Marine Corps

=== American Revolutionary War regiments ===
- 21st Continental Regiment

=== American Civil War regiments ===
- 21st Iowa Infantry Regiment
- 21st Illinois Infantry Regiment
- 21st Maine Infantry Regiment
- 21st Michigan Infantry Regiment
- 21st Mississippi Infantry Regiment
- 21st Ohio Infantry Regiment
- 21st Kansas Militia Infantry Regiment
- 21st Kentucky Infantry Regiment
- 21st Massachusetts Infantry Regiment
- 21st Wisconsin Infantry Regiment

== Cavalry regiments ==
- 21st Lancers, a unit of the British Army

== Engineer regiments ==
- 21st Construction Regiment (Australia), a former unit of the Australian Army's Engineers
- 21 Engineer Regiment (United Kingdom), a unit of the British Army's Royal Engineers

== See also ==
- XXI Corps (disambiguation)
- 21st Brigade (disambiguation)
- 21st Division (disambiguation)
- 21 Squadron (disambiguation)
- Regiment
