= 21 Squadron =

21 Squadron or 21st Squadron may refer to:

- No. 21 Squadron IAF, Indian Air Force
- No. 21 Squadron (Finland), Finnish Air Force
- No. 21 Squadron PAF, Pakistan Air Force
- No. 21 Squadron RAAF, Royal Australian Air Force
- No. 21 Squadron RAF, United Kingdom Royal Air Force
- No. 21 Squadron RNZAF, Royal New Zealand Air Force
- No. 21 Squadron RSAF, Royal Saudi Air Force
- 21 Squadron SAAF, South African Air Force
- 21st Aeromedical Evacuation Squadron, United States Air Force
- 21st Air Squadron, a unit in the 32nd Air Wing, Indonesian Air Force
- 21st Aircraft Carrier Squadron, Royal Navy
- 21st Airlift Squadron, United States Air Force
- 21st Bombardment Squadron, United States Air Force
- 21st Fighter Squadron, United States Air Force
- 21st Helicopter Squadron, United States Air Force
- 21st Operational Weather Squadron, United States Air Force
- 21st Photographic Reconnaissance Squadron, United States Air Force
- 21st Pursuit Squadron, United States Army Army Air Forces
- 21st Space Operations Squadron, United States Space Force
- 21st Special Operations Squadron, United States Air Force
- 21st Tactical Air Support Squadron, United States Air Force
- VF-21 (Fighter Squadron 21), United States Navy
- VP-21 (Patrol Squadron 21), United States Navy
- VP-21 (1943–1969), United States Navy
- VS-21 (Sea Control Squadron 21), United States Navy

== See also ==
- 21st Brigade (disambiguation)
- 21st Regiment (disambiguation)
