= Danny Matt =

Israeli general (1927–2013)

- דני מט
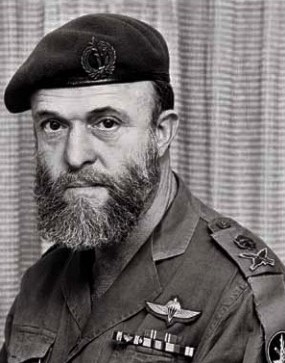
- Born: December 10, 1927; Cologne, Germany
- Died: December 5, 2013 (aged 85); Tel HaShomer, Ramat Gan, Israel
- Burial place: Kiryat Shaul Cemetery, Tel Aviv, Israel; 32.129°N 34.823°E
- Military career
- Allegiance: Israel
- Branch: Jewish Brigade; Israel Defense Forces
- Service years: 1944–1992
- Rank: Aluf (Major General)
- Conflicts: World War II; 1948 Arab–Israeli War; Sinai War; Six Day War; War of Attrition; Yom Kippur War

Danny Matt (Hebrew: דני מט; December 10, 1927 – December 5, 2013) was a decorated career Israeli military officer who served in the Israel Defense Forces from 1948 until 1992. He attained the rank of major general and fought in five Arab-Israeli wars, including the wars of 1948 and 1973. Among his many exploits was a daring operation involving leading a paratroop force across the Suez Canal during the Yom Kippur War. The operation was the beginning phase of a larger Israeli counter offensive that ultimately led to the victory of the Israeli army.

== Biography ==
Daniel (Danny) Matt was born in Cologne, Germany. He immigrated to Mandatory Palestine in 1934. His military career began in 1943 when he joined the British Mandatory Coastal Police but he covertly utilized his status in the Coastal Police to assist the nascent Palyam in its attempts to subvert anti-Jewish British immigration policies. He then attempted to join the British Army's Jewish Brigade but, despite his service with the Coastal Police, was rejected because of his youth. He then pressured his father to sign a false document indicating that he was 18 years old and presented this document to gain acceptance. He saw service in Egypt, Italy and the Netherlands. In 1946, he was discharged from the British Army, returned to Mandatory Palestine, and joined the Palmach, the Haganah's strike force.

== Military career ==
=== War of 1948 ===
During the 1948 Arab–Israeli War, Matt manned a machine-gun post at Ein Tzurim (renamed Rosh Tzurim following the Six-Day War), part of the block of settlements just south of Jerusalem that formed the Gush Etzion block. Arab attacks on the block were sporadic at first but intensified as the British departure date neared. In May 1948, Arab irregulars backed by the Jordanian Legion attacked the Gush Etzion block. Matt stood his ground and sprayed machine gun fire into the attacking forces. The fighting was so intense that at one point, he was throwing hand grenades with his right hand while firing the machine gun with his left. However, with supplies and ammunition exhausted and hopelessly outnumbered, the defenders were ordered by the nascent Israeli government to surrender and Matt was taken prisoner by the Jordanian Legion, however Matt managed to escape and ran into a forest. Matt was known for having a very large beard and as a result, he ripped it off with only his hands and walked out of the forest un-recognised by the Jordanians.

=== Border wars ===
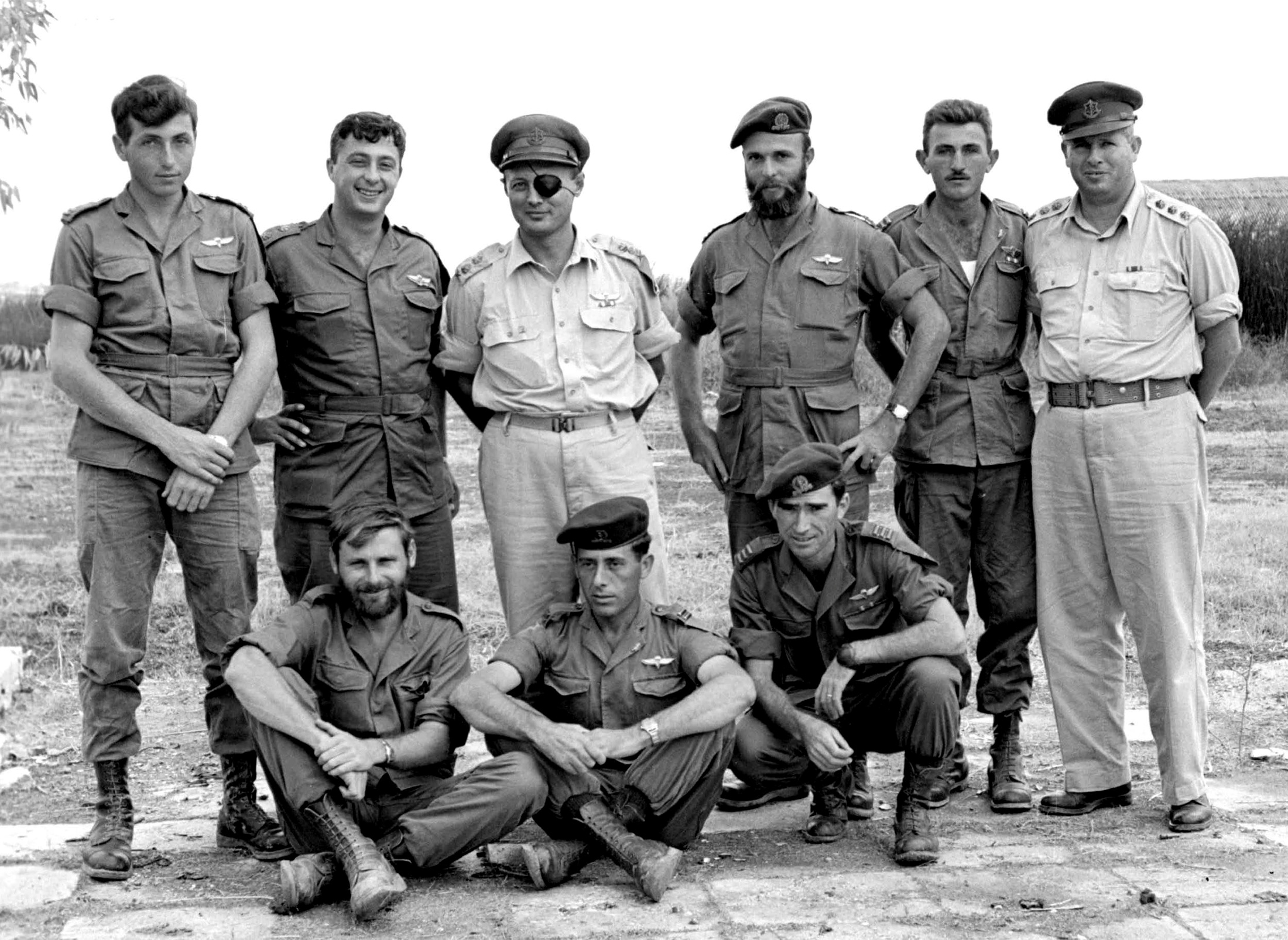
Danny Matt (third from right with beard and beret) with members of 890th Paratroop Battalion. Standing l to r: Lt. Meir Har-Zion, Maj. Arik Sharon, Lt. Gen Moshe Dayan, Capt. Danny Matt, Lt. Moshe Efron, Maj. Gen Asaf Simchoni; on ground, l to r: Capt. Aharon Davidi, Lt. Ya'akov Ya'akov, Capt. Raful Eitan

Following his release from captivity, Matt returned to civilian life for a short duration but soon returned to the IDF. He enrolled in an officer's training course and was given command of a unit responsible for thwarting Arab infiltrations into southern Israel. Ariel Sharon took note of Matt's military talents and persuaded him to join the elite and newly formed Battalion 890. The Battalion, a merge of the paratroops with members of Unit 101, was at the forefront of Israel's counter insurgency and retaliatory operations of the 1950s. Sharon appointed Matt to be a Company Commander. In February 1955 Matt along with Aharon Davidi led a force of 150 paratroopers on a night raid against an Egyptian military encampment in Gaza killing 37 Egyptian soldiers. The raid, which was carried out in retaliation for the murder of an Israeli boy on orders from Egyptian military intelligence, was hailed as a success by Israeli Defense Minister David Ben-Gurion.

=== Suez War ===
During the Sinai Campaign of 1956, Matt took part in the battle for the Mitla Pass and was wounded in the neck and shoulder. Some 260 Egyptian and 38 Israeli soldiers were killed in the battle. After his recovery, he was given various command positions within the military.

=== Six-Day War ===
During the Six-Day War of 1967, Matt commanded a reserve paratroopers brigade assigned to General Ariel Sharon's division and was tasked with silencing Egyptian artillery positions at Um-Katef in the Abu Ageila military complex. After being heliported deep into the enemy's rear, Matt's paratroopers marched several miles over dune-covered ground and surprised the Egyptian gunners and neutralized their artillery. The feat enabled General Sharon to mount a divisional assault unmolested by Egyptian artillery. On June 10, 1967, on the last day of the war, Matt's paratroops ferried by helicopter secured the southern Golan Heights defeating Syrian forces they encountered.

=== War of Attrition ===
Following the Six-Day War, Egypt and Israel became locked in a series of localized engagements along the Suez Canal. In addition, Palestinian guerilla groups staged infiltrations and terrorist attacks with the (ultimately unsuccessful) aim of establishing a permanent presence in the West Bank. During this period, Matt was given command of Paratroop Brigade 35. On March 21, 1968, he led the brigade in an assault against the Palestinian guerilla base at Karameh. Matt's men along with other infantry elements destroyed the Karameh base killing 150 guerillas and taking another 128 captive. Jordanian forces who attempted to intervene suffered 61 killed, 108 injured and four taken prisoner. The IDF sustained 28 KIA and eight of these were from Matt's paras. As a result of the operation, the guerrillas realized that they were vulnerable to Israeli reprisal actions and were forced to move their base of operations farther from the border.

Matt also led his para forces on a daring deep penetration commando raid into the heart of Egypt's Nile valley. On the night of 31 October/1 November, Matt's troops, ferried by Super Frelon helicopters over some 300 km of Egyptian airspace, attacked and destroyed two bridges over the Nile as well as an electrical transformer near the town of Nag Hammadi. The Israelis suffered no casualties but the damage to Egypt was immense and underscored its vulnerabilities to Israel's formidable commandos.

=== Yom Kippur War ===
On October 6, 1973, Egypt and Syria launched a multi-front, surprise attack on Israel. After neutralizing the Syrian threat, the Israelis turned their attention southward to deal with the Egyptians, who had by now dug into defensive positions on the east bank of the Suez Canal. On October 14, large Israeli and Egyptian tank formations dueled in Sinai in a battle that was decidedly one-sided in Israel's favor and resulted in a thorough Egyptian rout. The Egyptians lost some 260 tanks against only six Israeli. Capitalizing on their success, the Israelis embarked upon Operation Stouthearted Men, a complex plan involving a multi-divisional crossing of the Suez Canal. These forces would then encircle the Egyptian army. Spearheading the operation was the 247th Paratroopers Reserve Brigade under the command of Danny Matt. On the night of October 15, Matt and his brigade crossed the Canal and established a bridgehead on the western bank of the Canal Zone. Matt played a critical role in this operation, which ultimately resulted in the encirclement of the 3rd Egyptian army.

== Other military duties and appointments ==
Following the war, Matt was given command of the 90th reserve armored division. In 1974, he was appointed head of the Military Court of Appeals. From 1979 until 1982 he served as Coordinator of Government Activities in the Territories. From 1982 through 1992 he served as the Ombudsman for the soldiers, a role established by the Knesset in 1972 to address concerns and problems encountered by soldiers. In 1992, he retired thus ending 49 years of distinguished military service.

Despite his retirement from the army, Matt's commitment to the Israel Defense Forces did not diminish. In his civilian life, Matt served as chairman of the LIBI Fund, a nonprofit organization that assists IDF soldiers.

== Death ==
Matt died at the age of 85 at Sheba Medical Center in Tel HaShomer, Israel. He was laid to rest in a military funeral at Kiryat Shaul Cemetery in Tel Aviv, on December 6, 2013.
