= 2nd Infantry Division (Egypt) =

Egyptian Army combat formation

2nd Infantry Division (1947/9 - 1987) 2nd Mechanized Infantry Division (1987 - present)
- الفرقة الثانية مشاه ميكانيكي
- Active: 1947/9-present
- Country: Egypt
- Branch: Egyptian Army
- Type: Mechanized infantry
- Role: City Defense
- Size: 13,500+ soldiers
- Part of: Second Army (Former) Central Military Region (Current)
- Garrison/HQ: Northeast Cairo
- Nickname: El Firqa El Taniya
- Colors: Red, Blue, Yellow
- March: Egyptian Army March
- Anniversaries: October 8th
- Engagements: Six-Day War; Battle of Abu-Ageila; October War; Operation Badr; Battle of Firdan

Commanders
- Current commander: Brig. Gen. Emad Ahmed Mohammed
- Notable commanders: Brig. Gen. Hassan Abu Saada

The 2nd Mechanized Infantry Division of the Infantry Corps of the Egyptian Army is a heavy infantry formation created after the Second World War.

== History ==
After the defeat of the Egyptian forces in Palestine in 1948, a modernization programme in the army was started. In 1949 the 2nd Infantry Division was formed and it compromised 3 Infantry Regiments and 1 Reconnaissance Regiment. However the division never participated in the Suez Crisis. The division's first engagement was in the North Yemen Civil War along the other Egyptian units there. Ahmed Ismail Ali commanded the division from 1957/58 (exact date unclear) to 1960.

=== Six Day War, 1967 ===
Saad el-Shazly commanded the division in 1965–66. By June 1967, the division comprised the 10th Infantry Brigade, the 12th Infantry Brigade and the 51st Artillery Brigade. It defended the central sector of the Sinai Front at Abu-Ageila and Kusseima during the Six-Day War. It occupied a heavily fortified strongpoint at Um-Katef/Abu Ageila, a thicket of artillery pieces, anti-tank guns, entrenched, surrounded by barbed wire and minefields, backed by a force of some 90 tanks secreted in concrete bunkers available for a counterattack. But the division commander, by that time Major General Sa'di Naguib, was absent. Kandil describes how he had been appointed by Field Marshal Amer, and was "reluctant to leave [Amer's] side". And Naguib had not delegated to the command on the spot any ability to act on his own initiative.

Ariel Sharon was the overall Israeli commander who was to direct the assaults on the Egyptians in the area, supervising the 38th Division. After nightfall on 5 June, Israeli artillery began a barrage. Israeli tanks assaulted the northernmost Egyptian defenses and were largely successful, though an entire armoured brigade was stalled by mines, and had only one mine-clearance tank. Israeli infantrymen assaulted the triple line of trenches in the east. To the west, paratroopers commanded by Colonel Danny Matt landed behind Egyptian lines, though half the helicopters got lost and never found the battlefield, while others were unable to land due to mortar fire. Those that successfully landed on target destroyed Egyptian artillery and ammunition dumps and separated gun crews from their batteries, sowing enough confusion to significantly reduce Egyptian artillery fire. Egyptian reinforcements from Jabal Libni advanced towards Um-Katef to counterattack, but failed to reach their objective, being subjected to heavy air attacks and encountering Israeli lodgements on the roads. Egyptian commanders then called in artillery attacks on their own positions. The Israelis accomplished and sometimes exceeded their overall plan, and had largely succeeded by the following day. The Egyptians took heavy casualties, while the Israelis lost 40 dead and 140 wounded.

Yoffe's attack allowed Sharon to complete the capture of Um-Katef, after fierce fighting. The main thrust at Um-Katef was stalled due to mines and craters. After IDF engineers had cleared a path by 4:00 pm, Israeli and Egyptian tanks engaged in fierce combat, often at ranges as close as ten yards. The battle ended in an Israeli victory, with 40 Egyptian and 19 Israeli tanks destroyed. Meanwhile, Israeli infantry finished clearing out the Egyptian trenches, with Israeli casualties standing at 14 dead and 41 wounded and Egyptian casualties at 300 dead and 100 taken prisoner. Thus the division was defeated in the Second Battle of Abu-Ageila (1967).

=== Yom Kippur War, 1973 ===
The 2nd Infantry Division fought again during the Yom Kippur War as part of the Egyptian Second Army. It was one of the Egyptian divisions that took part in Operation Badr, the successful crossing of the Suez Canal that began the war. It crossed in the Ismailia area.

After the crossing, the five division-size bridgeheads consolidated themselves on Monday, October 8 into two army-size bridgeheads: the Second Army with its three divisions occupied El-Qantarah in the north to Deversoir in the south, while the Third Army with two divisions to the south. These two bridgeheads incorporated a total of 90,000 men and 980 tanks, dug in and entrenched. In common with the other four divisions, the 2nd Infantry Division arrayed, two infantry brigades in its forward echelon, and one mechanized infantry brigade in the second echelon, in accordance with the Operation Badr plan. In reserve was an armored brigade. The Egyptians had established anti-tank defences along their lines employing 9M14 Malyutka "Sagger" anti-tank guided missiles, RPGs, and B-10 and B-11 anti tank recoilless rifles.

At dawn a friendly fire incident occurred as the 2nd and 16th Divisions in Second Army were closing the gap between their bridgeheads. While cresting a ridge, two tank platoons from either division confronted each other at 460 meters (1,510 ft). The tank crews were so agitated that they opened fire immediately. Each platoon lost two of its three tanks to direct hits within minutes, and several men were killed.

=== Battle of Firdan ===
On October 8, General Avraham Adan's Armored Division was going to counterattack the 2nd and 16th Infantry Divisions of the second army and take over their lost positions on the east bank. Brigadier General Hassan Abu Sa'ada, commander of the 2nd Infantry Division prepared his division to halt the attack and defeat the Israelis.

After the arrival of the Israeli division, it was obliterated (losing around 300 tanks at this battle and the later Israeli armored attacks according to Abu Saada's claim and documented pictures of their tanks) (Yaguri's Brigade and around 40 tanks of the two other Brigades) and Colonel Assaf Yaguri was captured.

Jamal Hammad, the military historian wrote that (the decision of the commander of the second division was considered a new method to destroy the enemy, which is to attract his armored forces to a killing zone inside the head of the division bridge and allow it to penetrate the forward defense position and advance until a distance of 3km from the channel. The decision of the commander of the second infantry division - and on his personal responsibility - but the surprise in it was amazing, which helped in success. As the tanks of the brigade entered the killing field, they were fired upon from all weapons under the orders of the commander of the second division, the infantry leader Hassan Abu Saada. Within minutes most of it was destroyed M of enemy tanks, and 8 intact tanks were seized, as was Colonel Assaf Yaguri, commander of the 1st Battalion Brigade of the 190th armored Netka Brigade.

On the battle of Al-Firdan (Verdun Bridge), Major General Mohamed Abdel Ghani el-Gamasy, head of the Military Operations Authority, said that Israeli tanks rushed to penetrate Abu Sa`da sites towards Al-Fardan Bridge. In order to reach the channel line, and the more Israeli tanks advanced, the more Adan - the commander of the division that belongs to the 190th Armored Brigade "Netka" - had hope of success. The attacking force was surprised that it found itself inside a killing zone and the Egyptian fire opened against it from three sides at the same time in implementation of the Hassan plan Abu Saada. The greatest surprise was that the enemy tanks were being destroyed at a rapid rate by Egyptian tank fire, anti-tank weapons and artillery. Israeli tanks were advancing very strongly consisting of 35 tanks supported by Colonel Assaf Yaguri, one of the units that were leading the attack, and he was struck by terror. When he was wounded and thirty tanks were destroyed during a battle that lasted half an hour on the killing ground. Assaf Yaguri had no choice but to jump from the command tank and his crew to hide in one of the pits for several minutes, after which they were captured by the men of the second squad. This destroyed tank remained on the battlefield as a recording for everyone to watch after the war.

He felt relieved when he reported to us at the operations center about the success of the battle of the second division led by Hassan Abu Saada .. I called him on the phone to congratulate him on the completion of his division and we exchanged a short talk praising the planning and praising the implementation .... I was happy with what I heard from him about morale Of the division forces and their insistence on defeating the enemy

And about him, the late President Anwar Sadat says (that the one who performed this work was a leader of the new buds named Hassan Abu Saada) - from his book Searching for Self.

== Current Structure ==
- 4th Mechanized Brigade
- 120th Mechanized Brigade
- 56th Armored Brigade
- 51st Medium Range Artillery Brigade
- Air Defence Regiment
- ATGM Regiment
- Support Units:
  - Signal Battalion
  - Reconnaissance Battalion
  - Military Police Battalion
  - Engineers Battalion
  - Chemical warfare Battalion
  - Supply Battalion
  - Transport Battalion
