= Kingdom of Ambawang =

Former kingdom in Indonesia

Kerajaan Ambawang
- 1833–1837
- Capital: Pasir Putih
- Common languages: Malay (official)
- Religion: Islam
- Government: Monarchy
  - 1833: Syarif Alwi bin Syarif Idrus
  - 1833–1837: Syarif Khalid
- Historical era: Dutch colonialism
  - Established: 1833
  - Disestablished: 1837
Preceded by	Succeeded by
Kubu Kingdom	Kubu Kingdom
- Today part of: Indonesia

The Kingdom of Ambawang was one of the kingdoms that once existed in the Mount Ambawang in present-day Kubu Raya, West Kalimantan, Indonesia. It was founded by Syarif Alwi bin Syarif Idrus as part of a protest against the Dutch authority in the Kubu Kingdom, whose sovereignty had been taken away in 1823. Ambawang capital was in Pasir Putih, situated on the slopes of Mount Ambawang. The people of the Kingdom of Ambawang consisted of the Bugis and Malays from Perak.

The Kingdom of Ambawang came to an end when Syarif Khalid died in 1837 after establishing several settlements within his territory. Following the death of King Syarif Khalid, the administration and territorial authority of the Kingdom of Ambawang were reintegrated into the Kubu Kingdom.

== Establishment ==
The establishment of the Kingdom of Ambawang was first proposed by Syarif Alwi bin Syarif Idrus Al-Idrus in 1800. He was the second son of Syarif Idrus Al-Idrus, the founder of the Kubu Kingdom. His father died in 1795 and was succeeded as by his first son, Syarif Muhammad bin Syarif Idrus Al-Idrus. After the death of Syarif Idrus Al-Idrus, Syarif Muhammad bin Syarif Idrus Al-Idrus further strengthened trade relations with the Dutch, which had previously been initiated by their father. As a result, the Dutch rejected the proposal to establish the Kingdom of Ambawang by Syarif Alwi bin Syarif Idrus Al-Idrus, and it was not realized at that time.

On 7 June 1823, the Dutch conquered the Kubu Kingdom, ending the absolute rule of Syarif Muhammad as its king. The Dutch then asked Syarif Muhammad to sign an agreement recognizing Dutch sovereignty over Kubu. The signing of this agreement was met with protest by the Kubu people. Syarif Alwi, as the king's brother, eventually led a resistance against the Dutch in protest of the Dutch takeover of Kubu's authority. He gathered people who supported the resistance and formed a militia around Mount Ambawang. In 1833, Syarif Alwi declared the establishment of the Kingdom of Ambawang as a kingdom separate from Kubu.

== Government, people, and territory ==
The capital of the Kingdom of Ambawang was located in Pasir Putih, situated on the slopes of Mount Ambawang. Syarif Alwi ruled Ambawang with assistance from a royal minister named Ahmad Yamani. The population of the Kingdom of Ambawang largely consisted of Malays and Bugis. After the death of Syarif Alwi in 1833, his son, Syarif Khalid, succeeded him as King of Ambawang.

Syarif Khalid ruled Ambawang until the year 1837. During his reign, several settlements were established within the territory of the Kingdom of Ambawang by Malay and Bugis. The Malays, who came from Perak, founded a settlement in Telok Penyengat under the leadership of Enci' Kedai. This settlement was later named Teluk Pakedai. Meanwhile, the Bugis in the Ambawang established settlements that were later named Tanjung Kuala and Selat Remis. A settlement in Selat Remis was also built for one of Syarif Khalid's sons, named Syarif Zain. He was also appointed by Syarif Khalid as the leader of the settlement in Selat Remis.

== Collapse and reintegration ==
In 1837, Syarif Khalid died in Batavia. He was later buried in Parit Makam, Sungai Bemban. After his death, the Kingdom of Ambawang was dissolved, and its territory was reintegrated into the domain of the Kubu Kingdom.
