= Helem (disambiguation) =

Helem may refer to:

- Helem, a Lebanese LGBTQIA+ rights group
- Helem (name), the name of one or more people in the Bible
- Helem, the name of one or more people in The Book of Mormon
- Helem (Centuria), member of the Iris Stratum in the Japanese web manga Centuria
- Helem railway station, a railway station in India
- Operation Helem, often called Operation Shock, a commando operation executed on October 31, 1968, by Israeli paratroopers
