= Sungai Kakap =

Sungai Kakap is an administrative district (kecamatan) of Kubu Raya Regency (Kabupaten Kubu Raya), one of the regencies of West Kalimantan province on the island of Borneo in Indonesia. It lies to the south of the major city of Pontianak. Sungai Kakap is also an administrative village within the district.

== Administration ==
Sungai Kakap District is sub-divided into fifteen nominally rural villages (desa) all listed below with their areas and populations as at mid 2024, together with their postcodes. The northern villages (indicated by asterisks * below) include many of the coastal suburbs of Pontianak city. All 15 desa share the postcode of 78380.

Kode Wilayah	Name of kelurahan or desa	Area in km^{2}	Population mid 2024 estimate
61.12.09.2012	Sepuk Laut (a)	101.26	2,491
61.12.09.2010	Punggur Besar	85.80	8,656
61.12.09.2009	Punggur Kecil	99.81	15,686
61.12.09.2008	Kalimas	28.48	7,596
61.12.09.2011	Tanjung Saleh (b)	83.65	4,659
61.12.09.2007	Sungai Belidak *	13.69	3,576
61.12.09.2001	Sungai Kakap *	11.86	12,060
61.12.09.2002	Sungai Itik *	18.72	5,529
61.12.09.2006	Pal Sembilan *	35.77	27,427
61.12.09.2005	Sungai Rengas *	28.43	14,519
61.12.09.2003	Jeruju Besar *	19.72	7,301
61.12.09.2004	Sungai Kupah *	17.61	3,654
61.12.09.2013	Punggur Kapuas	27.99	2,498
61.12.09.2015	(Persiapan) Parit Keladi *	7.55	2,724
61.12.09.2014	(Persiapan) Rengas Kapuas *	6.63	10,702
61.12.09	Totals for district	586.97	129,078

Notes: (a) the most southern village in the district is an island desa in the southern part of the Kapuas River estuary.
(b) an island desa in the northern part of the Kapuas River estuary.
