= Sungai Raya =

Sungai Raya is an administrative district (kecamatan) of Kubu Raya Regency (Kabupaten Kubu Raya), one of the regencies of West Kalimantan province on the island of Borneo in Indonesia. It lies to the southeast of the major city of Pontianak. and in its western section contains many of the up-river suburbs of that city. Sungai Raya is also an administrative village within that western part which serves as the capital of the regency.

== Administration ==
Sungai Raya District is sub-divided into twenty-two nominally rural villages (desa) all listed below with their areas and populations as at mid 2024, together with their postcodes. They are grouped below into three non-administrative sectors, of which the most western is densely populated as it contains most of the up-river suburbs of the city of Pontianak. The central and eastern 72.5% of the district's area contains only 10% of the population. All 22 desa share the postcode of 78391 except for Kapur desa, which has the postcode of 78234.

Kode Wilayah	Name of desa	Area in km^{2}	Population mid 2024 estimate
61.12.01.2001	Sungai Raya	3.42	14,996
61.12.01.2016	Sungai Raya Dalam	12.51	23,795
61.12.01.2017	Parit Dalam	14.15	31,668
61.12.01.2008	Kapur ^{(a)}	6.28	17,887
61.12.01.2015	Mekar Baru ^{(a)}	9.33	14,561
61.12.01.2012	Teluk Kapuas	3.73	13,752
61.12.01.2003	Arang Limbung	15.72	28,241
61.12.01.2011	Limbung	45.37	17,574
61.12.01.2004	Kuala Dua	36.36	31,965
61.12.01.2002	Sungai Ambangah	29.48	6,385
61.12.01.2013	Madu Sari ^{(a)}	39.83	5,018
61.12.01.2005	Tebang Kacang	42.04	4,867
61.12.01.2014	Mekar Sari	57.17	12,205
61.12.01	Western sector	315.39	222,914

Kode Wilayah	Name of desa	Area in km^{2}	Population mid 2024 estimate
61.12.01.2010	Sungai Bulan	63.37	3,436
61.12.01.2021	Sukulanting	54.94	2,449
61.12.01.2006	Sungai Asam	58.45	5,883
61.12.01.2022	Permata Jaya	120.04	4,667
61.12.01.2019	Kalibandung	119.52	2,024
61.12.01	Central sector	416.32	18,459
61.12.01.2020	Muara Baru	182.89	1,133
61.12.01.2007	Pulau Limbung	125.24	2,339
61.12.01.2009	Gunung Tamang	124.36	1,953
61.12.01.2018	Pulau Jambu	26.13	928
61.12.01	Eastern sector	458.82	6,353
61.12.01	Totals for district	1,190.33	247,726

Note: (a) situated on the north bank of the Kapuas River.

== Sugai Raya Village ==
Sungai Raya is also a village within the far west of the district, situated on the south bank of the Kapuas Rover and immediately southeast of the city of Pontianak of which it is a suburb. Originally covering an area of 30.08 km^{2} containing about 70,000 inhabitants in 2024, it was divided into three by the creation of the new desa of Sungai Raya Dalam and Parit Dalam, leaving just 15,000 people in the residual desa.
