= Terentang =

- District
- Interactive map of Terentang
- Location within West Kalimantan Location within Kalimantan Location within Indonesia
- Coordinates: 0°22′45.3″S 109°37′57.2″E
- Country: Indonesia
- Province: West Kalimantan
- Regency: Kubu Raya Regency
- Established: 1969
- District seat: Terentang Hilir

Area
  - Total: 677.20 km^{2} (261.47 sq mi)

Population (2024)
  - Total: 14,475
  - Density: 21.375/km^{2} (55.360/sq mi)
- Time zone: UTC+07:00 (WIB)
- Postal code: 78392
- Regional code: 61.12.04

Terentang is a district in Kubu Raya Regency, West Kalimantan, Indonesia. The district covers an area of 677.21 km^{2}, and had a population of 14,801 at the 2025 estimate

== History ==
Terentang was established in 1969, after being split off from the northeastern part of Kubu district, which at the time was still part of Pontianak Regency. Following the establishment of Kubu Raya Regency in 2007, the district became part of the newly-established regency.

== Geography ==
Terentang consists of ten villages (desa), listed below with their populations as at mid 2024:

- Teluk Empening (1,280)
- Terentang Hilir (543)
- Terentang Hulu (1,554)
- Permata (1,639)
- Betuah (858)
- Sungai Radak Satu (1,888)
- Sungai Radak Dua (2,029)
- Sungai Dungun (974)
- Teluk Bayur (1,714)
- Radak Baru (1,546)
