= Sungai Ambawang =

Sungai Ambawang is an administrative district (kecamatan) of Kubu Raya Regency (Kabupaten Kubu Raya), one of the regencies of West Kalimantan province on the island of Borneo in Indonesia. It lies to the east of the major city of Pontianak.

== Administration ==
Sungai Ambawang District is sub-divided into fifteen nominally rural villages (desa) all listed below with their areas and populations as at mid 2024. All 15 desa share the postcode of 78393.

Kode Wilayah	Name of kelurahan or desa	Area in km^{2}	Population mid 2024 estimate
61.12.03.2007	Durian ^{(a)}	30.16	8,358
61.12.03.2001	Simpang Kanan	41.36	5,750
61.12.03.2009	Puguk	29.26	4,468
61.12.03.2003	Bengkarek	47.85	3,367
61.12.03.2012	Pasak Piang	135.65	3,410
61.12.03.2011	Pasak	35.61	4,589
61.12.03.2008	Panca Roba	58.21	4,604
61.12.03.2004	Lingga	54.59	5,877
61.12.03.2010	Korek	26.39	5,700
61.12.03.2002	Jawa Tengah ^{(a)}	13.61	5,747
61.12.03.2005	Sungai Ambawang Kuala ^{(a)}	11.84	15,319
61.12.03.2004	Mega Timur ^{(b)}	33.32	9,820
61.12.03.2013	Teluk Bakung	528.56	5,693
61.12.03.2014	Ampera Raya ^{(a)}	2.20	4,608
61.12.03.2015	Sungai Malaya ^{(b)}	35.35	3,938
61.12.03	Totals for district	1,083.96	91,248

Notes: (a) western section of district, adjoining Pontianak. (b) northwest corner of district, adjoining Pontianak
