= Battle of Abu-Ageila =

1967 battle of the Six-Day War

Coordinates: 30.8389°N 34.2558°E

- Part of the Six-Day War
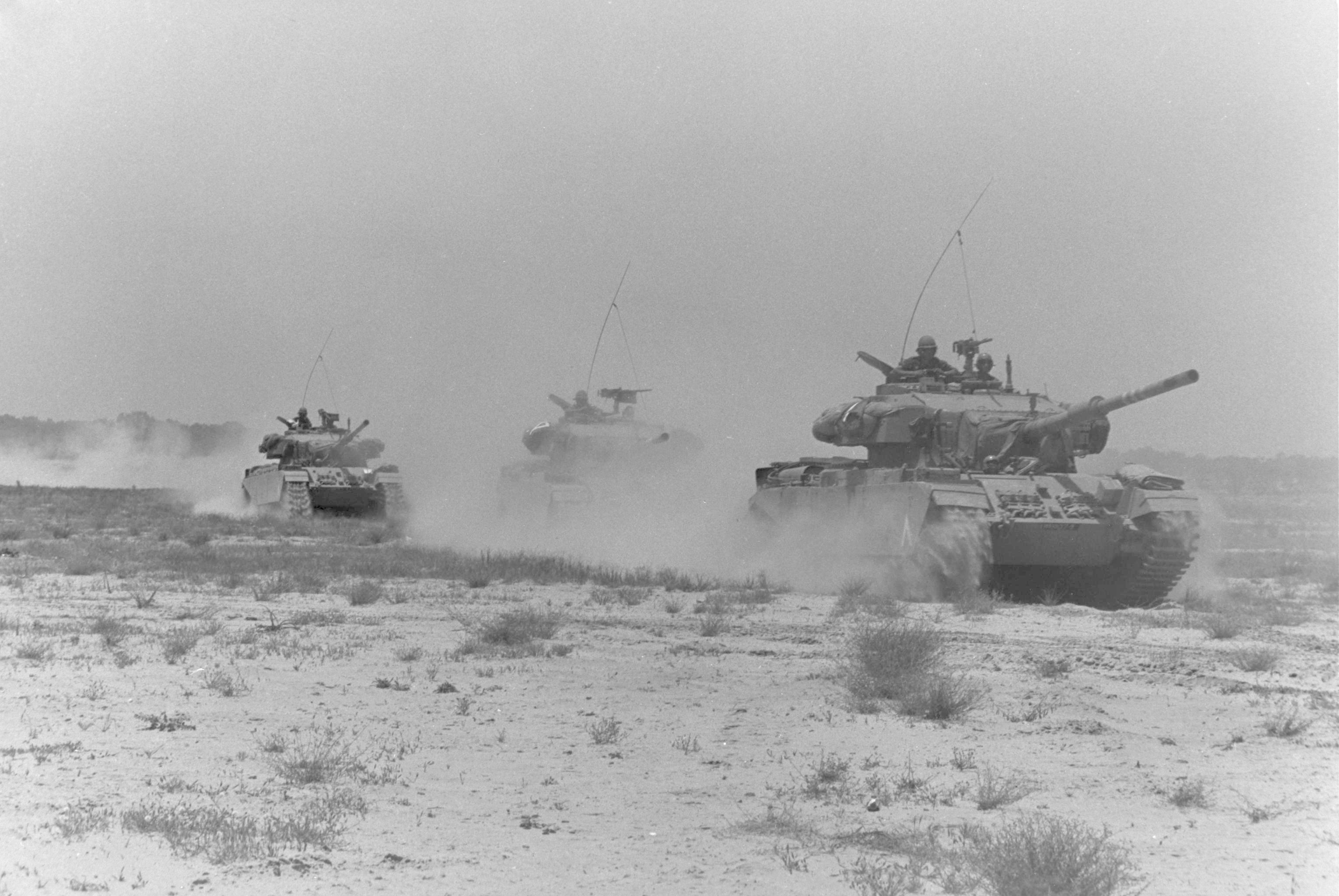
- Israeli Centurions shortly before the Six-Day War
Date	5–6 June 1967
Location	Abu-Ageila, Sinai Desert
Result	Israeli victory: Israeli complete control on Northern Sinai

Belligerents
Egypt	Israel

Commanders and leaders
Maher Marzouk (WIA); Col. Mohammad ibn Isa †	Ariel Sharon; Yeshayahu Gavish

Strength
8,000 – 16,000 participated; 66 tanks (T34/85s with 85 mm guns); 22 tank destroyers (SU-100s with 100 mm guns)	14,000; 150 tanks (over 100 Centurions and Super Shermans with 105 mm guns, the rest were AMX-13s with 75 mm guns)

Casualties and losses
2,000 casualties; 64 tanks destroyed	42 killed; 140 wounded; 8 tanks destroyed

The Battle of Abu-Ageila (also known as the Battle of Umm-Qatef; Hebrew: קְרַב אוֹם־כָּתֵף) was a military confrontation between the Israel Defense Forces and the Egyptian Army in the Six-Day War of June 1967. The decisive defeat of the Egyptians was critical to the eventual loss of the entire Sinai Peninsula to Israel. Leading Israeli forces was Major General Ariel Sharon, later a prominent politician and prime minister of Israel.

== Background ==
The Israeli attack at Abu-Ageila was part of the Israeli offensive into the Sinai Desert. Southern Command's offensive consisted of three divisions: Israel Tal's 84th Division, Avraham Yoffe's 31st Division, and Ariel Sharon's 38th Division. Sharon was tasked with the capture of the road junction at Abu-Ageila, in order to gain access to the central route into the Sinai Desert. The Egyptians had taken considerable preparations to prevent a breach there. Egyptian defences had focused on the Um-Katef (or Umm-Qatef) plateau to the east of Abu-Ageila, roughly 25 kilometers (16 mi) from the Israeli border. The defences were an important part of the overall defence plan, called Qahir, in the preparations for the expected war, later known as the Six-Day War.

== Opposing forces ==
Israeli troops numbered about 14,000. Egyptian troop strengths have been estimated at 8,000. More importantly, the Israelis had significant advantage in armour: Against 66 Egyptian World War II-era Soviet T34/85 with 85 mm guns and 22 SU-100 with 100 mm guns, the Israeli forces fielded a total of 150 modern tanks: light AMX-13s with 75 mm guns, as well as a hundred British Centurion and both M-50 and M-51 Sherman tanks, considerably upgraded from their WWII vintage and armed with French 75 mm and 105 mm tank guns. The guns used by the Centurions here were the 105 mm Royal Ordnance L7 tank guns, specifically designed to defeat the Soviet T-54 (much more modern than both types of tanks used by the Egyptians in this battle). On the other side, the best tank gun available for the Egyptians was the 100 mm cannon used by the 22 SU-100 tank destroyers (a late-WWII artillery piece overmatched by Centurion's frontal armor, although it posed a threat to AMX-13s). As a result, in addition to the IDF's numerical superiority, the Israeli tanks also had a greater effective range and firepower than their Egyptian opponents.

== Order of battle ==
=== Israeli forces ===
- 38th Armored Division
  - Divisional Mechanised Reconnaissance Battalion
  - 14th Armored Brigade (with Super Sherman tanks)
  - 63rd armored battalion (with Centurion tanks)
  - 99th "Negev" Infantry Brigade
  - 80th Paratroopers Brigade
  - 6 artillery battalions (105 mm & 155 mm Howitzers)
  - Divisional engineering battalion
  - Force A-B, improvised brigade-size battle group

=== Egyptian forces ===
- 2nd Infantry Division
  - 12th Infantry Brigade
    - 37th, 38th, 39th Infantry Battalions
  - 51st Artillery Brigade
    - 330th, 332nd, 334th Artillery Battalions
  - 2 Antiaircraft Companies
  - 1 Anti-tank Rocket Company

Attached to 12th Brigade

- 6th Tank Regiment (66 T34/85)
  - 288 Tank Battalion
- 1 Mechanised Antitank Battalion (22 SU-100)
- 352nd Infantry Battalion
- 299th Artillery Battalion
- 336th Medium Artillery Battalion

== Egyptian defences ==
The Egyptian defence was constructed as follows: the 2nd infantry Division prepared defenses in the area between Abu-Ageila and Kusseima, with the center placed at the area Um-Katef Plateau – Ruafa Dam, with the 12th Infantry Brigade defending Um-Katef and the 10th Infantry Brigade Kusseima. Um-Katef made a good position, because it was bordered by an area of sand dunes to the north and rocky mountains to the south. On this plateau, the Egyptians constructed three parallel trenches of about five kilometers each, reinforced by concrete bunkers. Every trench was defended by an infantry battalion, with the forward trench reinforced by a dug-in tank squadron. To the rear were two supporting artillery battalions (330th, 334th), behind them the balance of 288th Tank Battalion ready to counterattack. To the north, blocking the Batur Track at Position 181, were 38th Infantry Battalion, 299th Artillery Battalion and an antitank company of ten SU-100. They were to protect the flank of the main position to the southeast.

Five kilometers to the west of the Um-Katef Plateau perimeter was the Ruafa Dam. Dug in here were the 352nd Infantry Battalion, and the 332nd and 336th Artillery Battalions. Five kilometers to the northwest of Abu-Ageila, at the well and logistic center at Awlad Ali, the balance of the 6th Tank Regiment (one tank battalion) was positioned to block enemy forces coming from the northeast or against the positions of the 12th Brigade to the east or southeast.

To the east in front of the 12th Brigade positions on the ridge at Umm Tarafa was an outpost manned by an infantry company of 38th Battalion, a squadron of tanks from 288th Battalion, and two B-10 recoilless guns. At Position 239, south of Umm Tafara was a platoon of 37th Infantry Battalion, with two B-10 recoilless guns and two antitank weapons. Further east at Tarat Umm Basis near the Israeli border was the 2nd Reconnaissance Battalion, which was to give warning of any Israeli attack.

== Battle ==
The Israeli attack plan was based on intelligence gathered two days before the war started, which indicated Um-Katef was defended by only one infantry battalion. Based on this information, the Israelis planned a frontal attack by their reinforced independent tank battalion. After aerial bombardments, this tank battalion started its attack on Um-Katef on the 5 June at 08:15. The attack came to a halt however, due to resistance from an unknown Egyptian formation and an unknown minefield, causing the loss of seven Israeli Centurions. New orders for the independent tank battalion were to break off the attack and to attack from the north, through the sand dunes. Now the 14th armoured brigade (two tank battalions Super Shermans and two armoured infantry battalions in halftracks) was ordered to attack frontally further south. After a short aerial bombardment, this attack commenced at 12:30, but was forced to a halt as well.

Now that strength and positions of the Egyptians were known, General Sharon changed his plans. The independent tank battalion was ordered to drive through the sand dunes following a camel-path and attack the Egyptian armour at the Ruafa Dam. At the same time, the 14th armoured brigade would attack from the East. A prerequisite for the assault was the capture of Um-Katef, a task given to Sharon's reserve infantry brigade. This infantry attack was to occur under the cover of darkness, by means of a secondary approach to Um-Katef through the sand dunes. Meanwhile, the Israeli armour would provide support and all Israeli artillery would be used in support of this attack. This meant there would be no suppressing fire on the Egyptian artillery, making the Israeli infantry extremely vulnerable. It was decided that the Egyptian artillery would be taken out of action prior to the attack using the brigade of paratroopers. However, with only six helicopters available, only a limited number of units could be used. Meanwhile, the independent tank battalion was engaged by the Egyptian defenders in the sand dunes by 16:00 and were able to continue to their positions near Abu-Ageila and the Ruafa Dam at 18:00. The infantry brigade was in place at around 23:00, while the paratroopers, after being discovered and fired upon by Egyptian artillery, made it to their attack positions at 23:00.

The attack started on 5 June, at 00:00 hours, after the Israeli artillery had been firing from 23:30–00:00 hours with Israeli tanks moving into position under the noise of the artillery. After heavy fighting, the Israeli infantry battalions broke through the trenches at Um-Katef, with one-third of them cleared by 02:30. Now the engineers started clearing a way through the minefield which was completed at 04:00, allowing the 14th armoured brigade to roll on to the Ruafa Dam. On 6 June at 07:00, the Israelis attacked the Egyptian tank battalions and antitank battalions from two sides, with the Centurion tanks of the 14th from the east and the Super Sherman tanks from the west. After three hours of fighting, these Egyptian units were destroyed, after which remnants of the 12th Egyptian Brigade were cleared. At around 12:00, the road junction at Abu-Ageila was in Israeli hands and the road to the Sinai was open. The battle ended with 40 KIA and 19 tanks lost for the Israelis, and 2,000 killed and 60 tanks lost on the Egyptian side.

== Aftermath ==
The victory at Abu-Ageila meant the road to the Central Sinai was open for the Israelis in general, Sharon and his forces in particular. Many of the Egyptian units remained intact and could have tried to prevent the Israelis from reaching the Suez Canal. However, when the Egyptian Minister of Defense, Field Marshal Abdel Hakim Amer heard about the fall of Abu-Ageila, he panicked and ordered all units in the Sinai to retreat to the west bank of the Suez canal within a single day. There was no plan for the retreat, so the units left behind heavy equipment, and sometimes even outpaced their commanders. This resulted in the Israelis racing to capture abandoned sites, and obtaining significant amounts of abandoned tanks and equipment. So much was captured intact that after the war three mechanized and two armored brigades were created from this abandoned equipment. The withdrawal order effectively meant the defeat of Egypt. By 8 June, most of the Sinai area had been occupied by Israeli forces.
