= 38th Division (Israel) =

Division of the Israel Defense Forces

- Division insignia
- Active: 2026–present
- Country: Israel
- Branch: Israeli Ground Forces
- Part of: Israeli Ground Forces
- Garrison/HQ: Camp Immanuel

38th Division activation ceremony in February 2026

The 38th Division is a division of the Israel Defense Forces (IDF). The division was established in February 2026, following lessons learned during the "Gaza war". The division consists of the Israeli Ground Forces' schools and training units and is responsible for the force generation of the training brigades and their daily functioning, as well as their deployment as maneuvering forces in wartime. The division is assigned to the Israeli Ground Forces Command and headquartered at Camp Immanuel in the Shephelah region.

The division’s units include the IDF Officers' School (also known as Bahad 1), the Infantry Corps' Infantry Leaders School (828th Infantry Brigade "Bislamach"; also known as Bahad 3), the Armored Corps' Armor School (460th Armored Brigade "Bnei Or"; also known as Bahad 5 or Bislash), the Artillery Corps' Artillery School (425th Artillery Brigade "Shivta"; also known as Bahad 9), the Combat Engineering Corps' Military Engineering School (also known as Bahad 14 or Bahalatz), and the Combat Collection and Border Guard Corps' Border Guard School.

== Division organization ==
38th Division organization as of November 2026

- 38th Division
  - IDF Officers' School (Bahad 1)
    - "Dekel" Battalion (Lahav — Ground Forces Officers' Course)
    - "Hadas" Battalion (Lahav — Ground Forces Officers' Course)
    - "Rimon" Battalion (Lahav — Ground Forces Officers' Course)
    - "Dolev" Battalion (Lahav — Ground Forces Reserve Officers' Course)
    - "Harov" Battalion (Ma'oz — Battalion and Brigade Staff Officers' Course)
    - "Brosh" Battalion (Nachshon — Combat Support Staff Officers' Course)
    - "Erez" Battalion (Nachshon — Combat Support Staff Officers' Course)
    - "Alon" Battalion (Specialists — Academic Reserve Officers' Course)
    - "Gefén" Battalion (Infantry and Special Forces Officers' Specialization Course)
  - 460th Armored Brigade "Bnei Or" ("Sons of Light") (Armor School; Bahad 5 or Bislash)
    - 195th Battalion "Magen" (Armor School) (Merkava Mk.4)
    - 196th Battalion "Shahak" (Armor Officers' Course) (Merkava Mk.4)
    - 198th Battalion "Azuz" (Advanced Training and NCO School) (Merkava Mk.4)
    - 532nd Battalion "Shelah" (Operational Training) (Merkava Mk.4)
    - Logistic Battalion (Reserve)
    - 460th Reconnaissance Company (Reserve)
    - Signal Company (Reserve)
  - 828th Infantry Brigade "Bislamach" (Infantry Leaders School; Bahad 3)
    - 17th Infantry Battalion "Golan Lions" (trains 1st Infantry Brigade "Golani" and 84th Infantry Brigade "Givati" troops)
    - 450th Infantry Battalion "Flying Lions" (trains 35th Paratroopers Brigade and 900th Infantry Brigade "Kfir" troops)
    - 906th Infantry Battalion "Negev Foxes" (trains 933rd Infantry Brigade "Nahal" troops and the personnel of the infantry brigades' reconnaissance battalions)
    - (6828th) Reconnaissance Battalion (Reserve)
    - 749th Combat Engineer Battalion (Reserve)
    - 828th Logistics Battalion (Reserve)
    - Signal Company (Reserve)
  - 425th Artillery Brigade "Shivta" (Artillery School; Bahad 9)
    - Artillery Basic Training Battalion
    - Artillery Staff Training Battalion
    - Artillery Specialization Training Battalion
    - Artillery Advanced Training Battalion
    - Logistic Battalion
    - 5034th Signal Company
  - Military Engineering School (Bahad 14 or Bahalatz)
    - 614th Combat Engineer Staff Training Battalion
    - 615th Combat Engineer Specialization Training Battalion
    - 616th Combat Engineer Basic Training Battalion
  - Border Guard School
    - Border Infantry Basic Training Battalion
    - Border Guard Staff Training Battalion
    - Field Intelligence Collection Basic Training Battalion
    - Geospatial Intelligence Training Battalion
  - Division Logistic Group (Reserve - being formed)
  - Division Signal Battalion (being formed)
