= Kubu Raya Regency =

Regency in West Kalimantan, Indonesia

Kubu Raya Regency Kabupaten Kubu Raya
- Regency
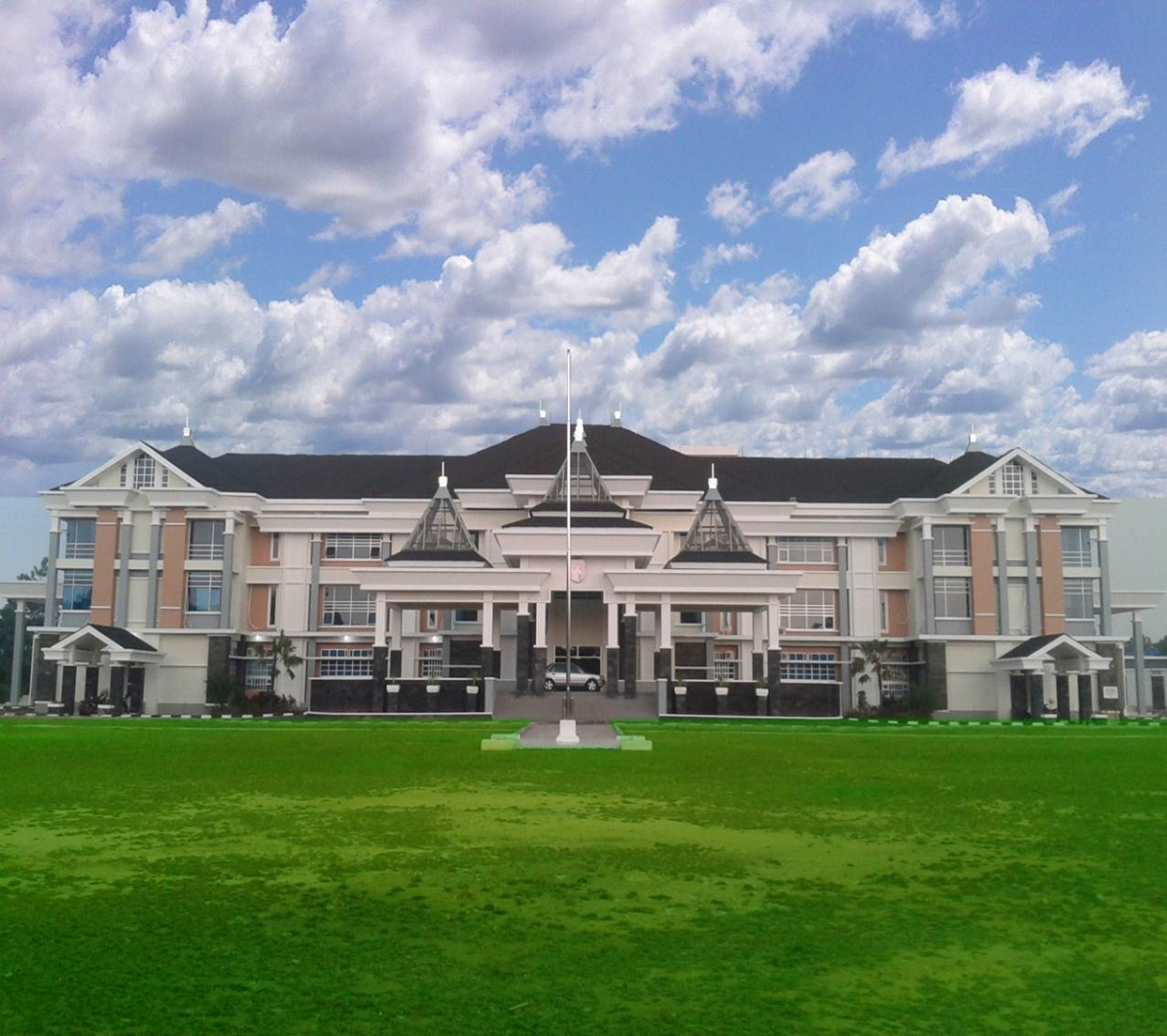
- Regent office

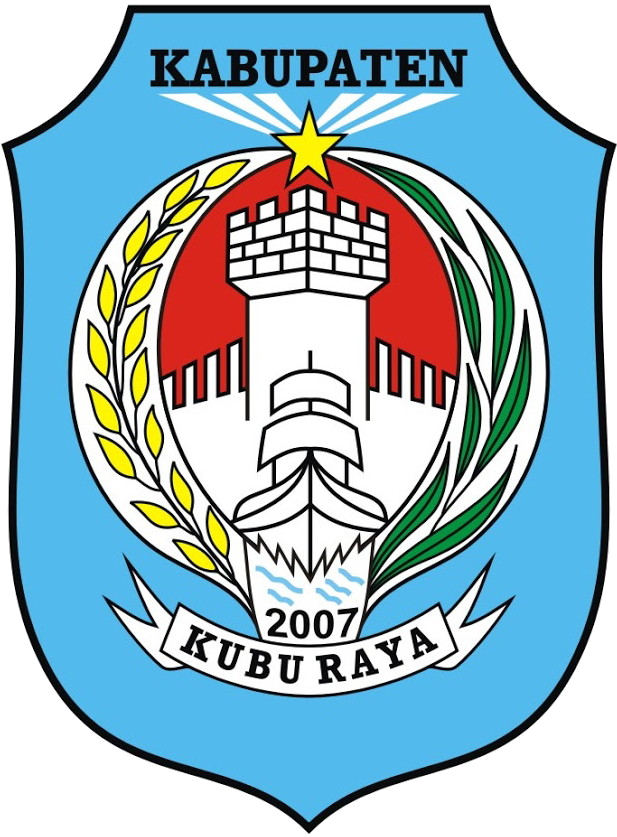
- Coat of arms

- Location within West Kalimantan

- Location in Kalimantan and Indonesia Kubu Raya Regency (Indonesia)
- Coordinates: 0.3534°S 109.4735°E
- Country: Indonesia
- Province: West Kalimantan
- Capital: Sungai Raya

Government
  - Regent: Sujiwo
  - Vice Regent: Sukiryanto

Area
  - Total: 8,568.01 km^{2} (3,308.13 sq mi)

Population (2025 estimate)
  - Total: 660,370
  - Density: 77.074/km^{2} (199.62/sq mi)
- Time zone: UTC+7 (IWST)
- Area code: (+62) 561
- Website: kuburayakab.go.id

Kubu Raya Regency or Great Kubu Regency is a regency of West Kalimantan, Indonesia. It was created on 17 July 2007 from the (larger) central and southern part of what was at that time the Pontianak Regency. It covers an area of 8,568.01 km^{2}, and it had a population of 500,970 at the 2010 Census and 609,392 at the 2020 Census; the official estimate as of mid 2025 was 660,370 (comprising 337,416 males and 322,954 females). The principal town lies at Sungai Raya, directly adjacent to the City of Pontianak. Despite its close location to Pontianak, the regional capital and economic centre of the West Kalimantan Province, Kubu Raya highly lacks sufficient infrastructure development, which has caused general suspicions regarding the performance of its local government.

== Administrative districts ==
The Kubu Raya Regency consists of nine districts (kecamatan), tabulated below with their areas and their populations at the 2010 Census and the 2020 Census, together with the official estimates as of mid 2025. The table includes the locations of the district administrative centres, the number of administrative villages in each district (all classed as rural desa), and its post code.

Kode Wilayah	Name of District (kecamatan)	Year formed	Area in km^{2}	Pop'n Census 2010	Pop'n Census 2020	Pop'n Estimate mid 2025	Admin centre	No. of villages	Post code
61.12.05	Batu Ampar	—	2,431.36	33,113	35,856	36,698	Padang Tikar	15	78385
51.12.04	Terentang	—	677.20	10,177	13,235	14,801	Terentang Hilir	10	78392
61.12.06	Kubu	—	1,562.46	36,469	42,052	44,369	Kubu	20	78384
61.12.08	Teluk Pakedai (Pakedai Bay)	—	409.38	18,767	20,287	20,747	Selat Remis	14	78383
61.12.09	Sungai Kakap (Kakap River)	—	587.33	101,200	123,102	133,290	Sungai Kakap	13	78380
61.12.07	Rasau Jaya	2001 (from Sungai Kakap)	209.18	23,499	30,346	33,822	Rasau Jaya	6	78381 & 78382
61.12.01	Sungai Raya ^{(a)} (Great River)	—	1,190.33	188,014	234,087	256,328	Sungai Raya	22	78391 ^{(b)}
61.12.03	Sungai Ambawang (Ambawang River)	1961 (from Sungai Raya)	1,180.75	65,879	83,085	91,548	Ambawang Kuala	15	78393
61.12.02	Kuala Mandor B	1999 (from Sungai Ambawang)	320.02	23,852	27,342	28,767	Kuala Mandor	5	78355
	Totals		8,568.01	500,970	609,392	660,370	Sungai Raya	118	

Notes: (a) including the town (then classed as a kelurahan) of Sungai Raya, which had 62,010 inhabitants at the 2010 Census; by the 2020 Census this town had been split into three desa within the district, among which the desa of Sungai Raya had 14,996 inhabitants in mid 2024, Sungai Raya Dalam had 23,795, and Parit Baru had 31,668. Other desa similarly suburban to Pontianak (and up-riv er from the city) include Kapur with 17,887, Mekar Baru with 14,561, Arang Limbung with 28,241, Limbung with 17,574 and Kuala Dua with 31,965.
(b) except the desa of Kapur, which has a post code of 78234.
