= Abu Ageila =

Road junction In the north of the Sinai peninsula in Egypt

Coordinates: 30°50′35.30″N 34°07′03.84″E

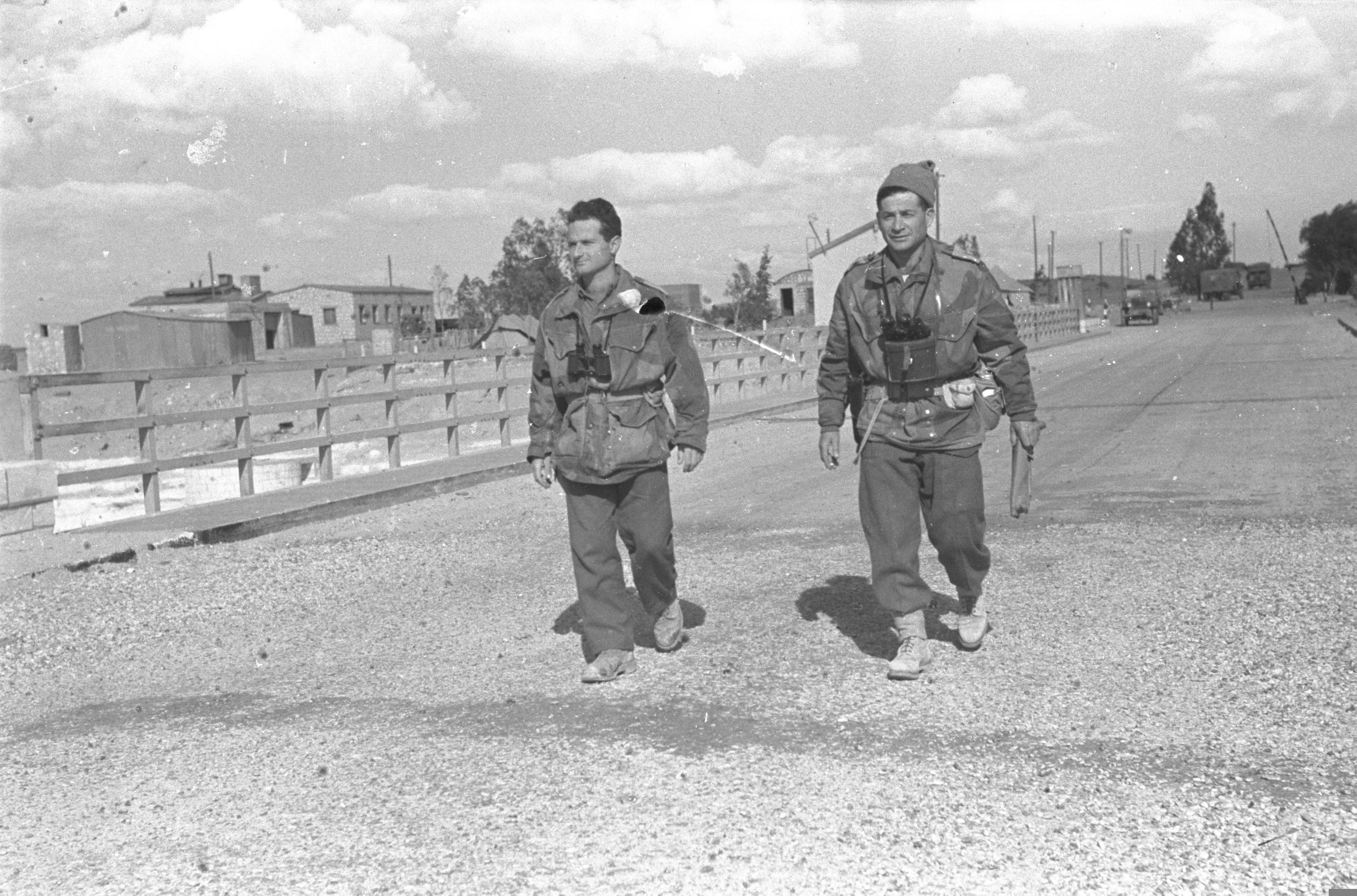
Abu Ageila in December 1948

Abu Ageila is a road junction and dam in the north of the Sinai Peninsula in Egypt, which, because of its proximity to Egypt's border with the State of Israel, is strategically important. Located approximately 25 kilometres from Auja al-Hafir, and 45 kilometres southeast of El Arish, it was the site of major battles in the 1948, 1956, and 1967 wars between the two states. The adjacent location Umm Katef (Arabic: أم قطف) was another key Egyptian position in the Abu Ageila battles.

In 1930, there were about 10,000 'Azazme Bedouin Egyptians, related to the Tarabin in El Arish, living in the area. By 1948, the number was only 3,500. Land ownership was often disputed between the inhabitants.

In his 2013 biography of Ariel Sharon, 'Arik: The Life of Ariel Sharon', David Landau records that, during the Israeli occupation of Egypt's Sinai Peninsula, Sharon ordered the secret expulsion from Abu Ageila of 3,000 of its inhabitants in late January 1972. Ostensibly, this was to clear the way for a military exercise code-named Oz (meaning "Valour" in Hebrew) in preparation for an attack on the Suez Canal were a further war to break out between Israel and Egypt. The expulsion order was executed by Israeli military personnel over three days during the onset of freezing temperatures in the desert. No warning was given to the inhabitants, and no time was allowed for them to collect their belongings before being removed from their homes. Lt. Gen. David Elazar later ordered that the expelled inhabitants be allowed to return.

== Gallery ==
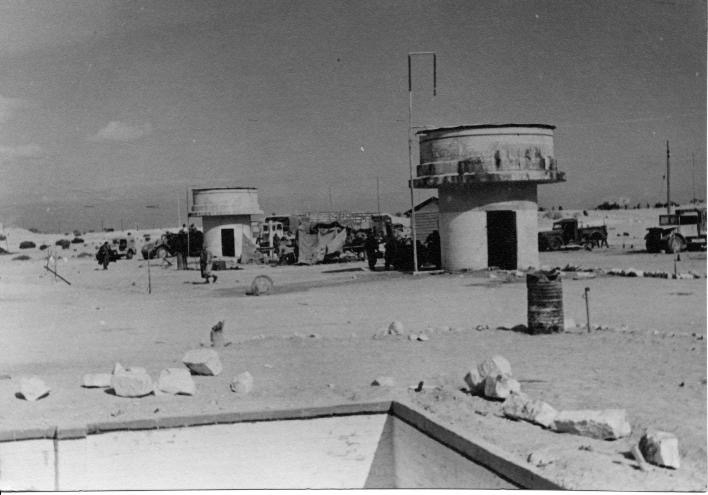
Egyptian water tanks at Abu Ageila. 1948

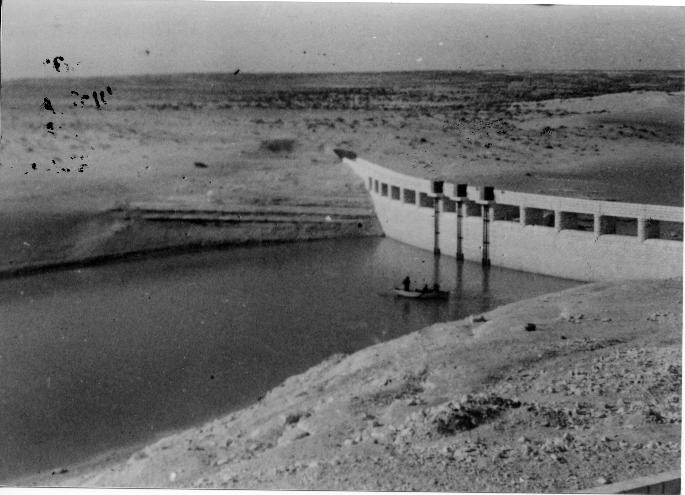
Ruafa dam, 1948

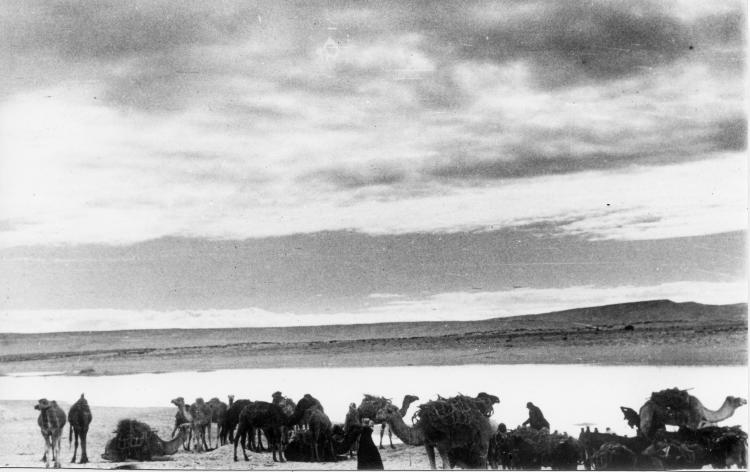
Ruafa dam. 1948
