= Operation Shock =

Operation Shock מבצע הלם
- Part of War of Attrition
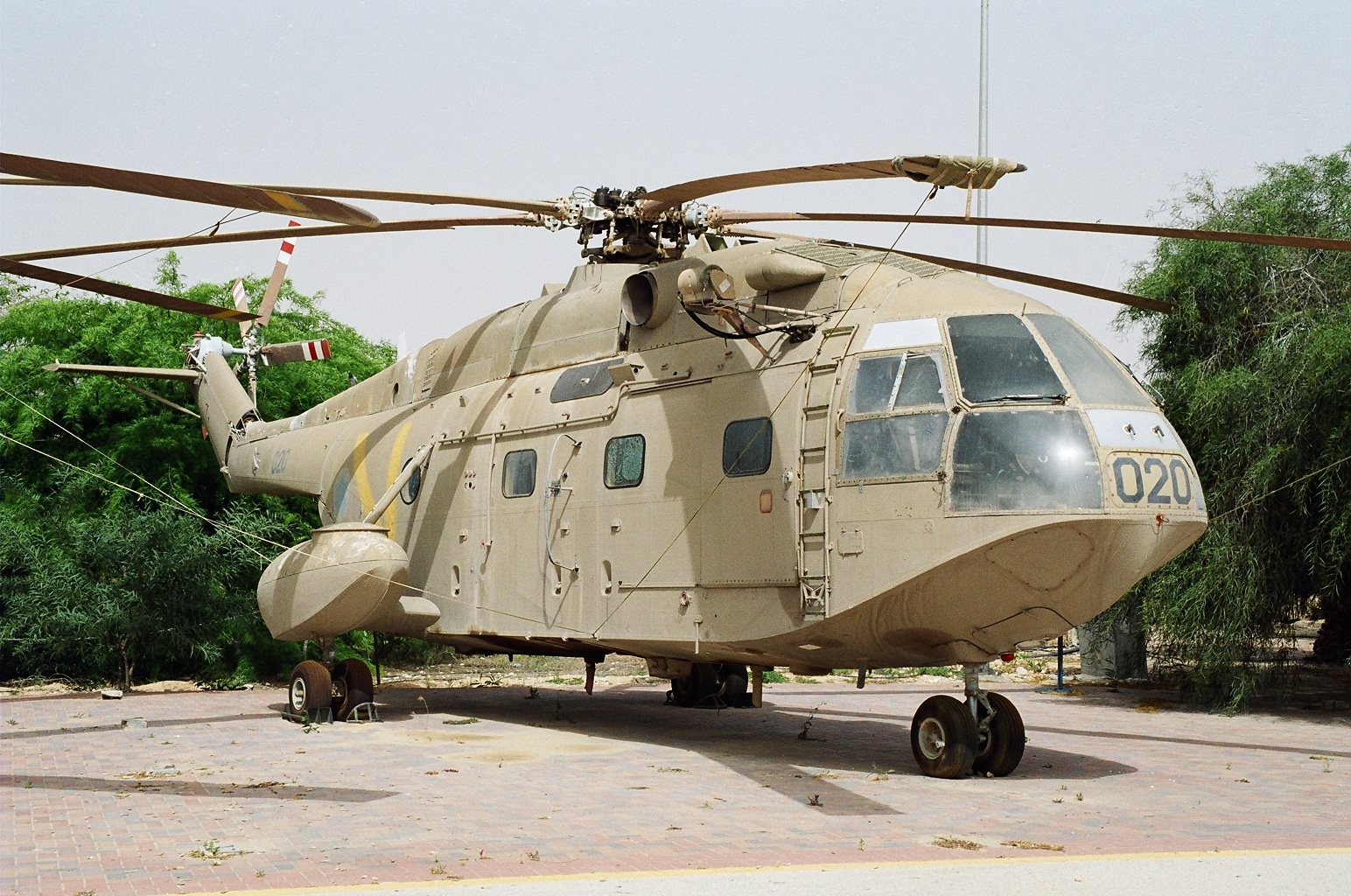
- Super Frelon helicopter
Date	October 31, 1968; 57 years ago
Location	Egypt
Result	Israeli victory: Mission successful; Qena bridge irreparably damaged; Nag-Hammadi dam damaged; 7 out of 9 transformers destroyed; Egyptian shelling on IDF positions along the Suez canal halted for four months.

Belligerents
Israel	Egypt

Strength
14 paratroopers, 4 Super-Frelon helicopters	

Casualties and losses
None	

Operation Shock (Hebrew: מבצע הלם) was a commando operation executed on October 31, 1968, by Israeli paratroopers. Targets of the raid were the new Qena bridge 280 miles south of Cairo, the Nag Hammadi bridge 35 miles west of Qena span and the Nag Hammadi transformer station near the bridge. The station provided electricity to the area and was described as a switching station on a high tension line between Cairo and the Aswan Dam.

== Background ==
The War of Attrition between Israel and Egypt lasted from 1968 to 1970 and was fought along the cease-fire lines that ended the 1967 Six-Day War.

Both sides intended the war of attrition to weaken the other as much as possible in hopes of gaining advantages in subsequent negotiations. Egypt in particular sought to regain territory it had lost in 1967. Egypt's leader, Gamal Abdel Nasser, calculated that by waging a low-grade war on Israel over territory it lost in the Six-Day War, international pressure would force Israel to withdraw. Nasser was also intent on redressing the humiliation he and Egypt had suffered in the 1967 war. Israel, for its part, attempted to solidify its hold on Sinai as some members of the Israeli cabinet and Knesset believed the Peninsula should be annexed to Israel—a step toward achieving the vision of a Greater Israel.

== Planning ==
In response to two heavy artillery bombings conducted by the Egyptian army on IDF positions along the Suez Canal, which killed 25 soldiers, the IDF initiated a long series of operations against deep military and strategic targets in Egypt. Operation Shock was the first which targeted Egypt's electricity infrastructure.
