= Shri =

Sanskrit honorific

The Sanskrit character śrī in the Devanagari script

Shri (Note: Other spellings include Sri, Sree, Shree, Shrih and śrī.) (/ʃriː/; Sanskrit: श्री, romanized: Śrī, pronounced [ɕriː]) is a Sanskrit term denoting resplendence, wealth and prosperity, primarily used as an honorific.

The word is widely used in South and Southeast Asian languages such as Hindi, and also among Philippine languages. It is usually transliterated as Sri, Sree, Shri, Shiri, Shree, Si, or Seri based on the local convention for transliteration. While Sri is also used in Tamil, the true equivalent honorific is Tiru.

The term is used in Indian subcontinent and Southeast Asia as a polite form of address equivalent to the English "Mr." in written and spoken language.

"Shri" is also used as a title of veneration for deities or as honorific title for individuals.

"Shri" is also an epithet for Hindu goddess Lakshmi, while a yantra or a mystical diagram popularly used to worship her is called Shri Yantra.

== Etymology ==
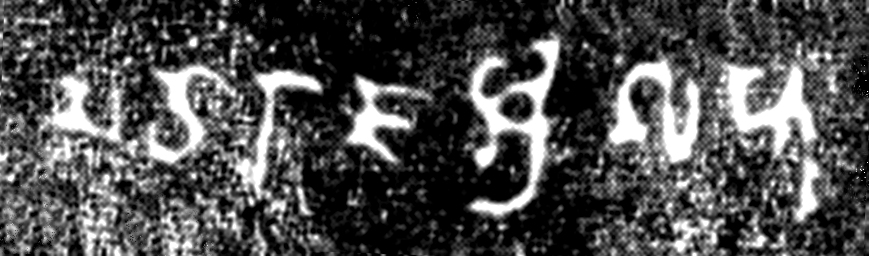
MahārājaShrīGupta "Great King, Lord Gupta" in Gupta script, on the Allahabad pillar inscription of Samudragupta (4th century CE).

Monier-Williams's dictionary gives the meaning of the root verb śrī as "to cook, boil, to burn, diffuse light", but as a feminine abstract noun, it has received a general meaning of "grace, splendour, beauty; wealth, affluence, prosperity".

The word śrī may also be used as an adjective in Sanskrit, which is the origin of the modern use of shri as a title. From the noun is derived the Sanskrit adjective "śrīmat" (śrimān in the masculine nominative singular, śrīmatī in the feminine) by adding the suffix indicating possession, literally "radiance-having" (person, god, etc.). This is used in modern vernacular as form of address Shrimati (abbreviated Smt) for married women, while Sushri (with "su", "good", added to the beginning) can be used for women in general (regardless of marital status).

=== Spelling and pronunciation ===
In Devanagari script for Sanskrit, Hindi, Marathi and other languages, the word ⟨श्री⟩ is a combination of three sounds: श् (ś), र् (r) and ई (ī, long i). There are two conventions in India to transliterate the consonant श् (ISO: ś) to English: some use s (which in narrower transcription represents only स्) as in Sri Lanka and Srinagar, while others use sh as in Shimla and Shimoga. Similarly, री (rī; र् + ई) is also transliterated to English in two different ways as ri and ree, although the latter is non-standard in Hindi. Hence this word श्री may be rendered in English as Shri (the standard spelling), Shree, Sri or Sree; some other transcriptions used are Shiri and Shrii.

Sanskrit is written in many other Indian scripts as well, each of which has its own equivalents of these Devanāgari characters.

== Usage ==
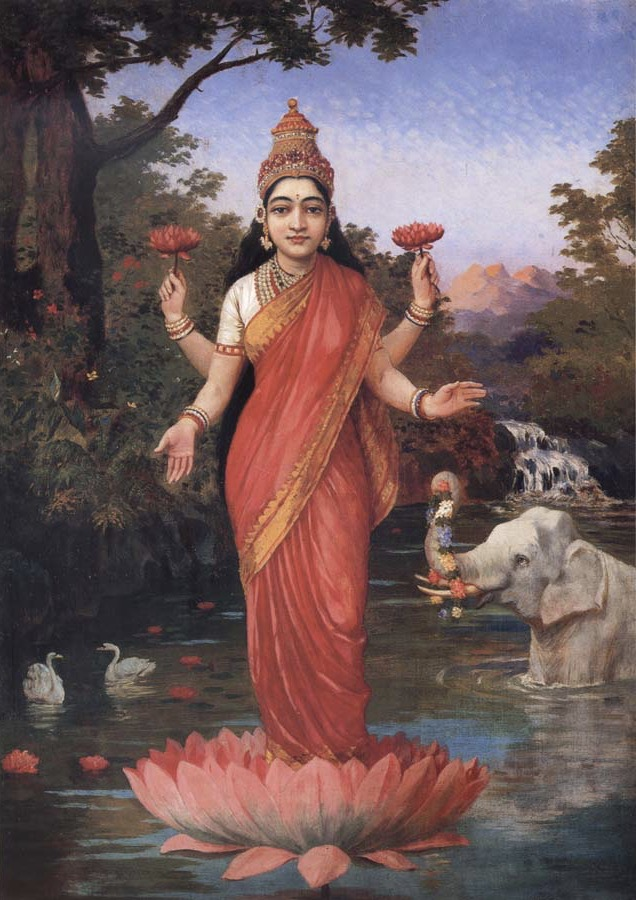
Shri is an epithet of the Hindu goddess Lakshmi.

Shri is a polite form of address equivalent to the English "Mr." or "Ms.".

Shri, also rendered Sridevi, is an epithet of Lakshmi. The Vedas speak of Shri as a goddess, who personified ten qualities coveted by other divine beings: food, royalty, holiness, kingdom, fortune, sovereignty, nobility, power, righteousness, and beauty. The Vedic Shri is believed to have identified with later conceptions of Lakshmi, as the embodiment of royalty and dignity.

== Other current usage ==
There is a common practice of writing Shri as the first word centralised in line at the beginning of a document.

Another usage is as an emphatic compound (which can be used several times: shri shri, or shri shri shri, etc.) in princely styles, notably in Darbar Shri, Desai Shri, and Thakur Shri or Shrii Shrii Anandamurti, the founder of the social and spiritual movement Ananda Marga (the Path of Bliss).

The honorific can also be applied to objects and concepts that are widely respected, such as the Sikh religious text, the Shri Guru Granth Sahib. Similarly, when the Ramlila tradition of reenacting the Ramayana is referred to as an institution, the term Shri Ramlila is frequently used.

A common Sikh greeting is “Sat Shri Akaal (Gurmukhi: ਸਤਿ ਸ੍ਰੀ ਅਕਾਲ)”, meaning “Truth is divine and eternal”. Shri here is used to denote divinity or godliness.

=== Indian music ===
The use of the term is common in the names of ragas (musical motifs), either as a prefix or postfix. Some examples are Shree, Bhagyashree, Dhanashree, Jayashree, Subhashree, Itishree, Jiteshree, and Shree ranjani.

== Other languages ==
=== South and Southeast Asia ===
| Language/Script | Form | Notes |
|---|---|---|
| Bengali | শ্রী | |
| Balinese | ᬰ᭄ᬭᬷ, ᬰ᭄ᬭᬶ, or ᬲ᭄ᬭᬶ (all read as sri) | Comparable to the Javanese usage: a particle prefixed to royal names, the goddess of rice-culture. |
| Burmese | သီရိ (thiri) and သရေ (tharay) | See Tamil below. |
| Dhivehi | ސިރީ (siree or sirī) | Used in the full titles of sultans and kings |
| Gujarati | શ્રી | |
| Gurmukhi (Punjabi) | ਸ਼੍ਰੀ | |
| Javanese | ꦯꦿꦷ, ꦯꦿꦶ, or ꦱꦿꦶ (all read as sri) | Often used to address royal or venerated figures, such as the King of Yogyakarta, Sri Sultan Hamengkubuwono and the title "Sri Bhaginda" (equivalent to "your majesty"), and for names of deities, such as the Javanese rice goddess Dewi Sri. In modern Javanese, it is a common part of proper names of Javanese people, e.g the name of Indonesian finance minister Sri Mulyani Indrawati and Indonesian marine corps officer Lt. Col Sri Utomo. "Sri" is also a widely used name in Java used for names of placements, organizations, institutions, etc |
| Kannada | ಶ್ರೀ (Sri or Sree) | |
| Khmer | ស្រី (Srey) and សេរី (Serey) | |
| Lao | ສີ (Si) and ສຣີ (Sri or Sree) | |
| Maithili | 𑒬𑓂𑒩𑒲 (shri/shree) | |
| Malay (including Malaysian and Indonesian varieties) | Jawi: سري, Latin: Seri (Malaysian); Sri (Indonesian) | Often used as a title of veneration for honorific titles in Malay kingdoms and sultanates. This includes the honorific title for the Sultan of Brunei: Kebawah Duli Yang Maha Mulia Paduka Seri Baginda Sultan Hassanal Bolkiah and King of Malaysia: Kebawah Duli Yang Maha Mulia Seri Paduka Baginda. It is also used for the name of places in the Malay world such as Bandar Seri Begawan in Brunei and Siak Sri Indrapura city in Sumatra, Indonesia Usage of "Sri" in Indonesia is used for honorary titles for a king or other great person, for example the King of Yogyakarta Sri Sultan Hamengkubuwono and Sri Baginda which means "Your Majesty", and is also used for people's names, mainly Javanese people such as Indonesian finance minister Sri Mulyani, Indonesian marine officer Lt. Col Sri Utomo, Indian-Indonesian businessman Sri Prakash Lohia, etc. It also refers to the Javanese rice goddess "Dewi Sri". "Sri" is also used as names of companies, placements, institutions, etc (e.g — Sriwijaya Air, Sriwijaya University, etc). The oldest recorded word of "Sri" founded in Indonesia was written in the Mulawarman inscription founded in Kutai, East Kalimantan dating back to the 4th century AD which read: srimatah sri-narendrasya, kundungasya mahatmanah (meaning: "the maharaja Kudungga, who was very noble") |
| Malayalam | ശ്രീ (Sri or Sree) | |
| Meitei (Manipuri) | ꯁ꯭ꯔꯤ (transliterated as "shri/shree/sri/sree" in Meitei script) | Used as honorific as in Shri Biren and Shri Shri Govindaji Temple |
| Nepal Bhasa (Newari) | 𑐱𑑂𑐬𑐷 (Sri) | |
| Odia | ଶ୍ରୀ | |
| Philippine languages / Baybayin | ᜐ᜔ᜇᜒ (Sri or Si or Sree) | Formerly used as an honorific title for rulers in old Indianized precolonial states and polities in the Philippines, such as Sri Lumay of Cebu or Sri Bata Shaja of Butuan or Sripada/Sipad of Lupah Sūg or Sikatuna of Bo-ol. |
| Sinhala | ශ්‍රී (Sri or Sree) also ශ්රී (Sri or Sree) or සිරි (Siri) | Meaning "resplendent", as in Sri Lanka, "Resplendent Island". |
| Tamil | ஸ்ரீ (Sri or Sree) | The Tamil equivalent tiru is also used. |
| Telugu | శ్రీ (Sri or Sree) | |
| Thai | ศิริ (Siri) and ศรี (Sri or Sree or Si) | Used in many Thai place names, as seen below. |
| Vietnamese/Cham | Chế | Vietnamese transcription of honorific name prefix used among the Cham ethnic minority. |

=== Place names ===
The honorific is incorporated into many place names. A partial list follows:

- Sriharikota, India
- Srimangal, Bangladesh
- Srisailam, Andhra Pradesh, a Siva temple, also one of the holiest places of worship for Hindus.
- Srikakulam, a town in northern Andhra Pradesh.
- Sri City, an integrated township located on the Andhra Pradesh and Tamil Nadu border.
- Shri Kshetra, name of the Puri Jagannath Dham, Odisha. One of the four Dhams in the Hindu religion.
- Sree Mandira is a famous Hindu temple dedicated to Jagannath (Krishna) and located in the coastal town of Puri in Odisha.
- Sri Lanka, an island country at the southern tip of India.
- Sri Perumbudur, a town in the state of Tamil Nadu
- Sri Rangam, an island zone in the city of Tiruchirapalli, in Tamil Nadu.
- Srinagar, nagar meaning "city", is the capital of the union territory of Jammu and Kashmir
- Sri Jayawardenapura Kotte, the administrative capital of Sri Lanka.
- Sri Maha Bodhi, a sacred fig tree in the Mahamewna Gardens, Anuradhapura, Sri Lanka.
- Srivijaya, a former kingdom centered on Sumatra, Indonesia.
- Siak Sri Indrapura, the capital seat of Siak Regency. It was the place of the Sultanate of Siak Sri Indrapura.
- Sri (ศรี), pronounced and usually transliterated Si in Thailand place names:

Phra Nakhon Si Ayutthaya (พระนครศรีอยุธยา), formal name of the city and province of Ayutthaya
Nakhon Si Thammarat (นครศรีธรรมราช) city and province
Sisaket (ศรีสะเกษ) city and province
Si Racha (ศรีราชา), the namesake town of Siracha hot sauce

- Wat Si Saket in Vientiane, Laos.
- Bandar Seri Begawan, the capital of Brunei.
- Seri Menanti, the royal town of Negeri Sembilan, Malaysia.
- Banteay Srei, a 10th-century Hindu temple in Angkor, Cambodia
- Srey Santhor, a district located in Kampong Cham, Cambodia.
- Serei Saophoan, the capital city of Banteay Meanchey, Cambodia.
