= Mulavarman =

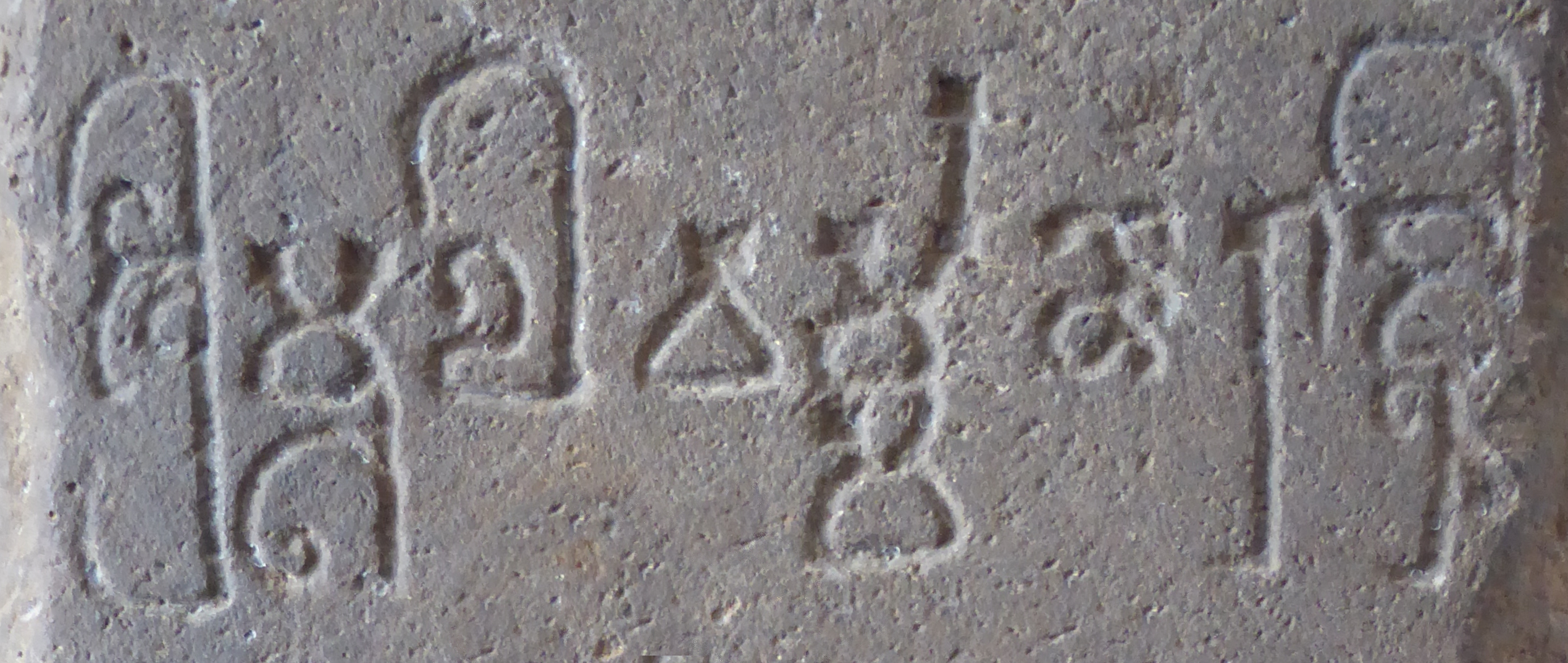
The name Shri Mū-la-va-rmma-ṇaḥ Rā-jñaḥ "The Lord, Prince Mulavarman" in a yupa inscription in pallawa script from Kutai. 4th-5th century CE. In other inscriptions, Mulavarman is also called "Lord of Kings".

Location of Kutai in Indonesia.

Sri Mulavarman Nala Deva (spelled Mulawarman in Indonesian) was the king of the Kutai Martadipura Kingdom, located in eastern Borneo around the year 400 CE. What little is known of him comes from the seven yūpa inscriptions found at a sanctuary in Kutai, East Kalimantan. He is known to have been generous to brahmins through the giving of gifts, including thousands of cattle and large amounts of gold.

== Reign ==
He was the grandson of Kudungga, and the son of Asvavarman, according to one of his inscriptions. The sanctuary bears the name of the founder of the dynasty, Vaprakesvara.

The inscriptions of Mulavarman in Brahmi script on "yūpa" sacrificial posts are the earliest known evidence of Indian influence in the Malay World, in the fourth century CE, long before the region was Indianized. The inscriptions of Mulavarman were followed about fifty years later by the inscriptions of another king, Purnavarman, in West Java.

== Inscriptions ==
The inscriptions of Mulavarman in Brahmi script were found on "yūpa" sacrificial posts.

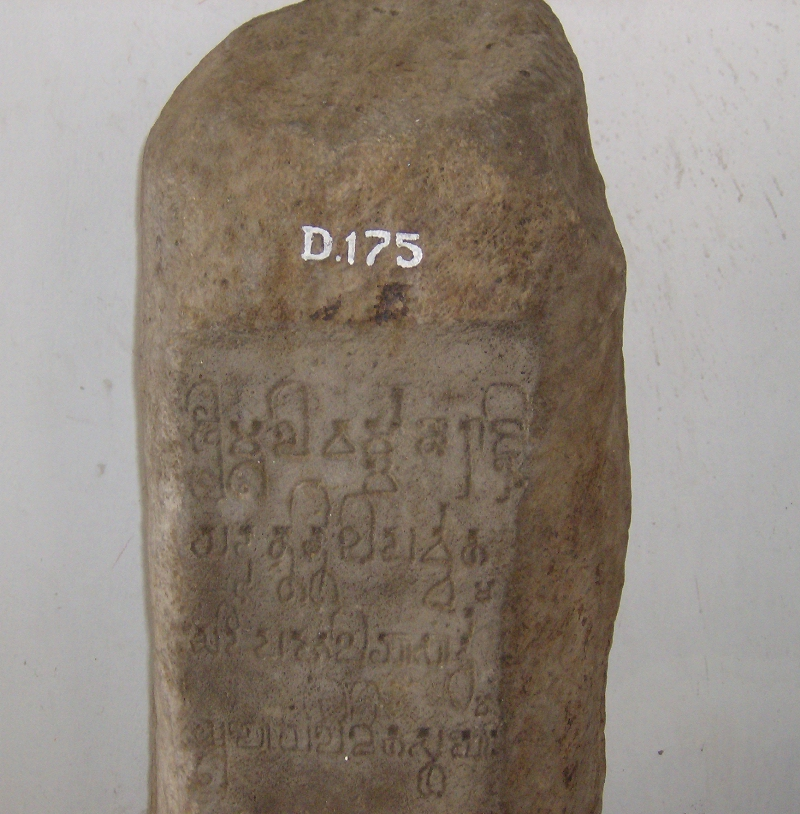
One of the yūpa Mulavarman inscriptions from Kutai, at the National Museum in Jakarta

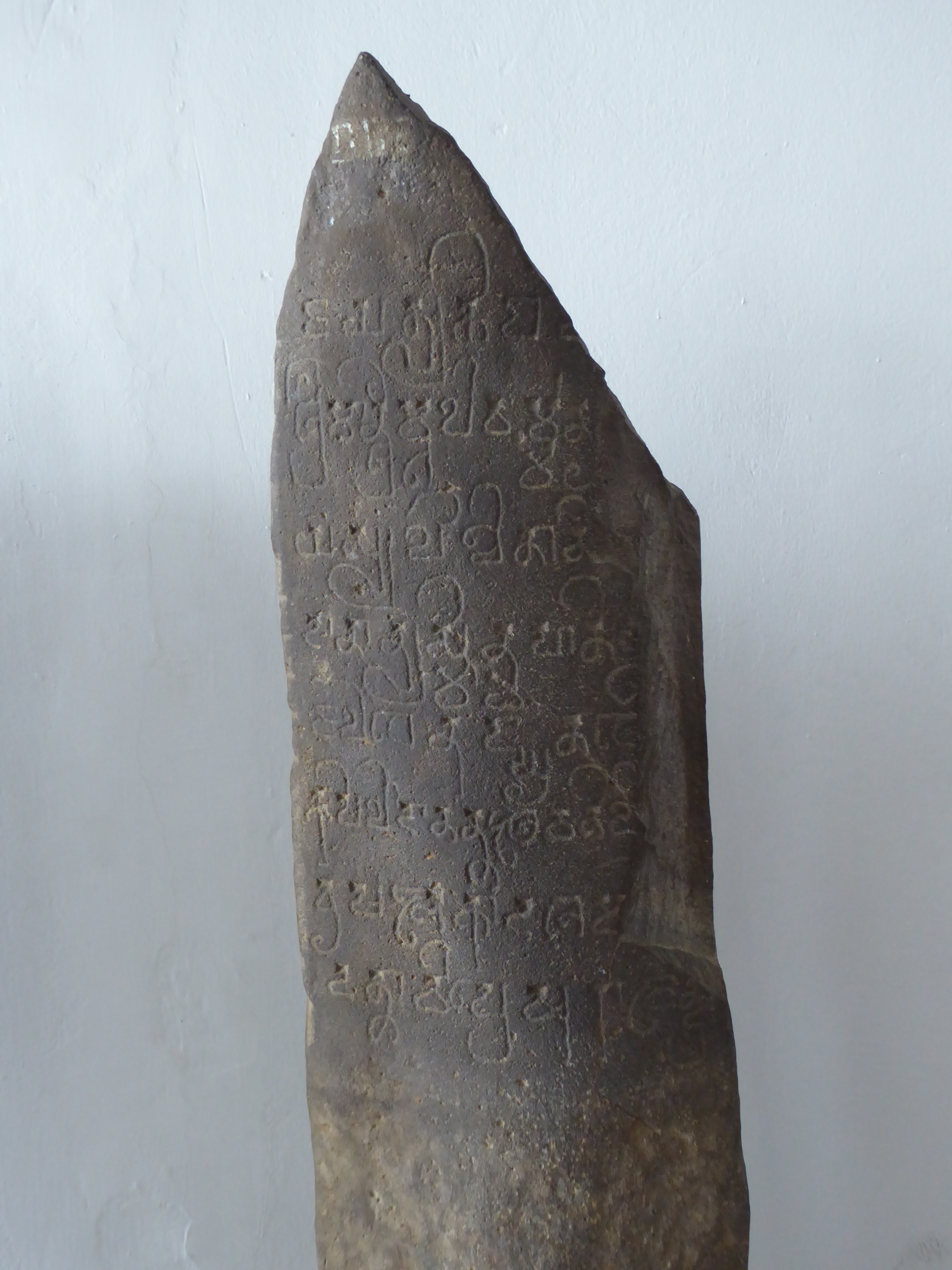
Mulavarman inscription on a yūpa, 5th century CE

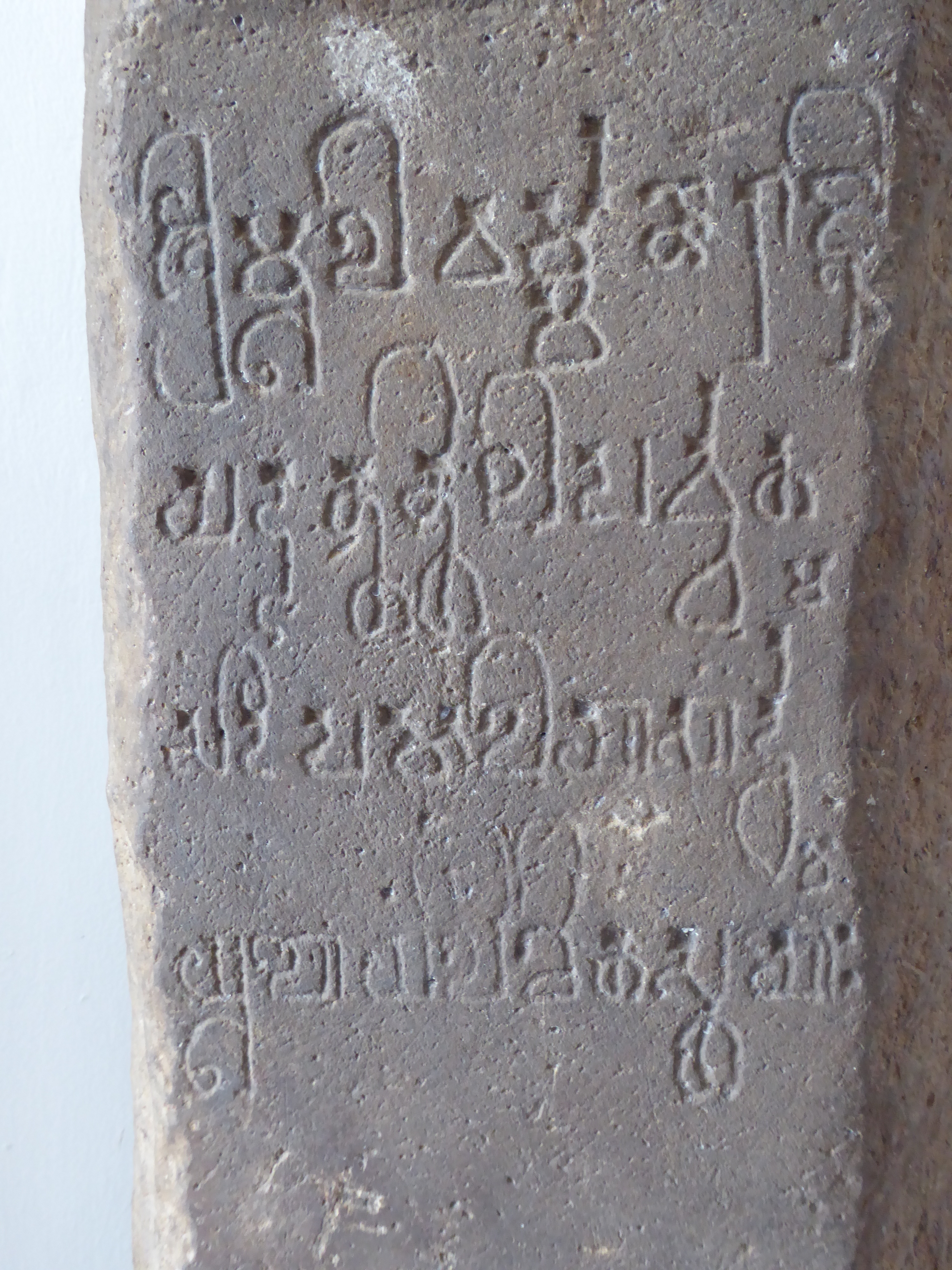
Mulavarman inscription on a yūpa, 5th century CE

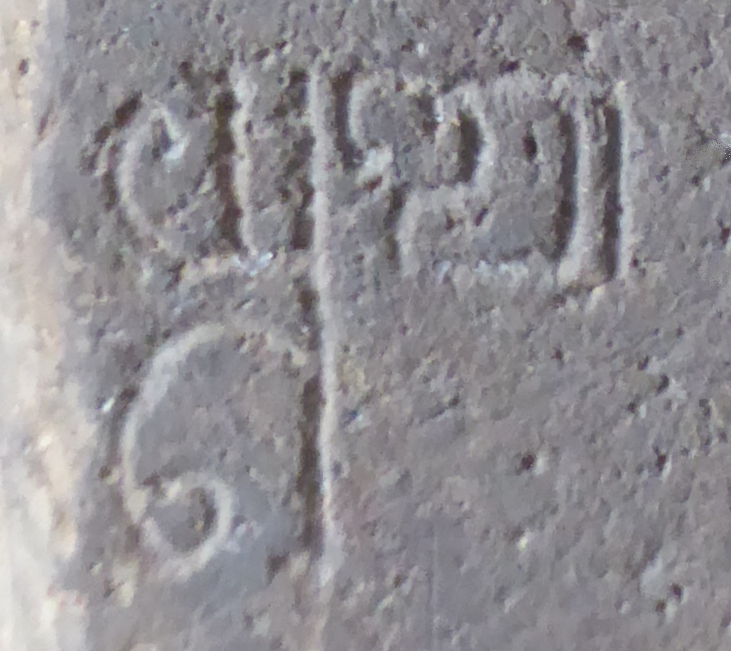
The word "Yūpo" in Brahmi in a Mulavarman Inscription, Muara Kaman, Kalimantan, 5th century CE

== See also ==
- Mulawarman University, the state-university of East Kalimantan named after the king
- Kodam VI/Mulawarman, the military-district of the Indonesian Army covering East, South, and North Kalimantan named after the king
