= Kodam VI/Mulawarman =

VI Military Regional Command/Mulawarman
- Komando Daerah Militer VI/Mulawarman
- Kodam VI/Mulawarman coat of arms
- Active: 19 July 1958 - present
- Country: Indonesia
- Branch: Indonesian National Armed Forces
- Type: Indonesia Regional Military Command
- Part of: Indonesian Army
- Garrison/HQ: Balikpapan
- Mottos: Gawi Manuntung Waja Sampai Kaputing (Banjarese) "Do it until it's done"

Commanders
- Commander: Maj.Gen. Tri Budi Utomo
- Chief of Staff: Brig.Gen. Bayu Permana

Kodam VI/Mulawarman (VI Military Regional Command/Mulawarman) is a military territorial command (military district) of the Indonesian Army. It has been in active service as the local division for Nusantara, East Kalimantan, and North Kalimantan.

== Brief history ==
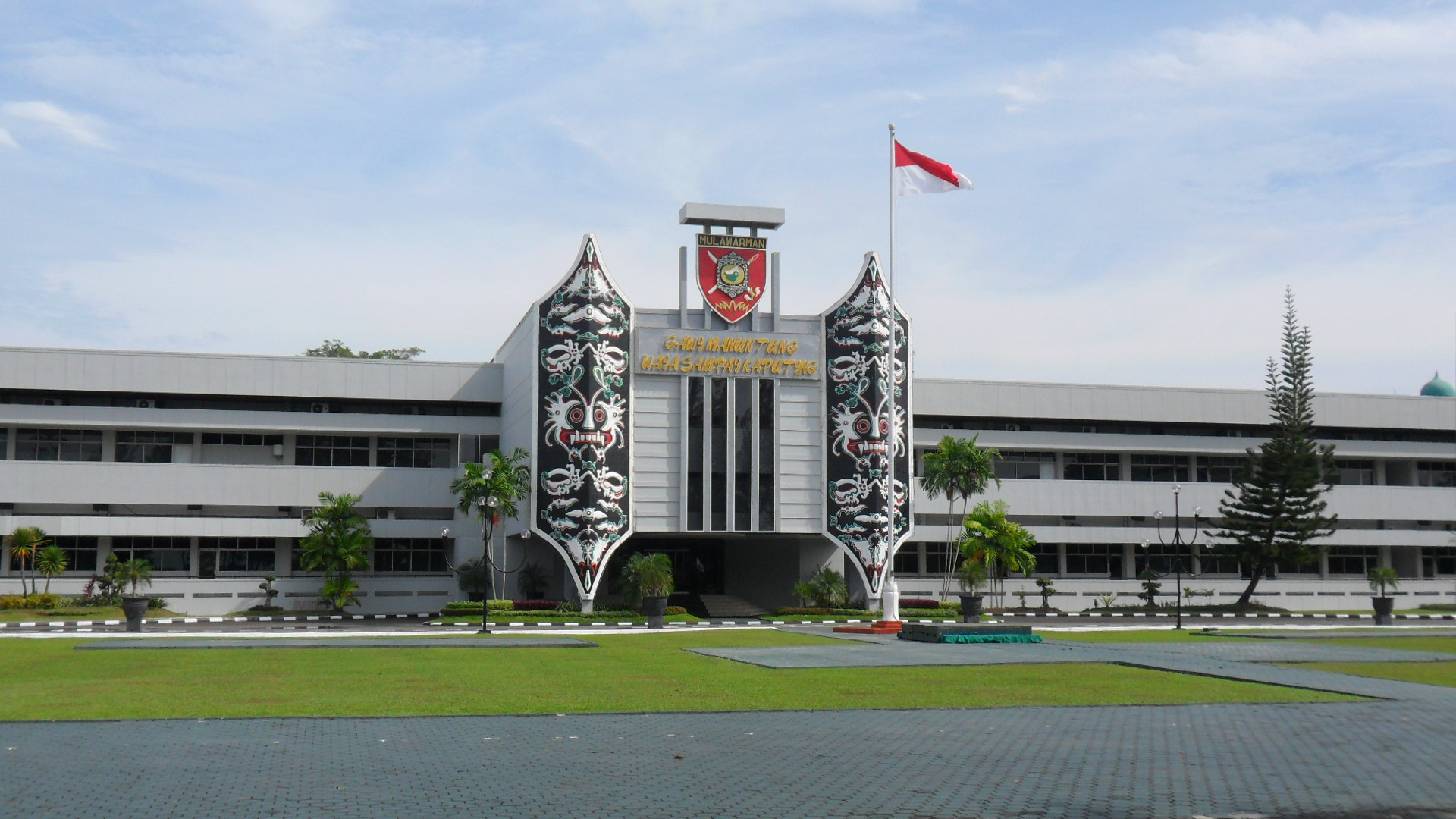
VI Mulawarman Military district command HQ, situated in Balikpapan, East Kalimantan

The name "Mulawarman" is named after the legendary king Mulavarman of the Kutai Martadipura Kingdom who ruled in the 5th century CE, historically one of the earliest Hindu kingdoms in Indonesia, located in current Kutai Kartanegara Regency, East Kalimantan.

The 6th MRC, then as the 10th Military Region Command (Komando Daerah Militer X) holding the Lambung Mangkurat honorific was activated on 19 July 1958 with the headquarters in Banjarmasin and serving South and Central Kalimantan, while the 9th MRC (Komando Daerah Militer IX), holding the Mulawarman honorific, was based in Samarinda and with East Kalimantan as its AOR. Both formations were raised in response to the threat faced by the Permesta revolt the same year as they split from the then 6th Territorial Army (established 1950 on the basis of the Lambung Mangkurat Infantry Division, formerly the 4th Naval Division of the Indonesian Navy established in 1949). This format lasted until the 1984 reorganization of military regions by the Commander of the National Armed Forces, when the 6th MRC was granted the Tanjungpura honorific when it merged with the 10th and 9th MRCs with a new garrison in Balikpapan. In 2010, the INAF split its military region command for Indonesian parts of Borneo into two, thus the 6th MRC, now with a smaller AOR including North, East and South Kalimantan and with its garrison still in Balikpapan, was granted the Mulawaman honorific title.

The 6th MRC serves as the de facto military region for the planned capital city of Nusantara under construction.

== Military Territorial units ==
The region is composed of 3 Military Area Commands and 1 Training Regiment.

1. Korem 091/Aji Surya Natakesuma with HQ in Samarinda, responsible for East Kalimantan and National Capital City Nusantara

- Kodim 0901/Samarinda
- Kodim 0902/Tanjung Redeb
- Kodim 0904/Tanah Grogot
- Kodim 0905/Balikpapan
- Kodim 0906/Tenggarong
- Kodim 0908/Bontang
- Kodim 0909/Sangatta
- Kodim 0912/Sendawar
- Kodim 0913/Penajam
- Kodim 0914/Mahakam Ulu
- 611th Mechanized Infantry Battalion/Awang Long

2. Korem 092/Maharajalilla, with HQ in Tanjung Selor, serving North Kalimantan

- Kodim 0903/Tanjung Selor
- Kodim 0907/Tarakan
- Kodim 0910/Malinau
- Kodim 0911/Nunukan
- Kodim 0915/Tana Tidung
- 622nd Infantry Battalion (New raising)

=== Training Units ===
Training units in Kodam VI/Mularwaman are organized under the 6th Regional Training Regiment (Rindam VI/Mulawarman). The units are as follows:

- Regiment HQ
- NCO School
- Basic Combat Training Center
- National Defense Training Command
- Specialist Training School
- Enlisted Personnel Training Unit

== Combat and Combat support units ==
- 24th Raider Infantry Brigade/Bulungan Cakti, with HQ in Tanjung Selor
  - Brigade HQ
  - 613th Raider Infantry Battalion/Raja Alam
  - 614th Raider Infantry Battalion/Raja Pandhita
  - 615th Raider Infantry Battalion
- 600th Raider Infantry Battalion/Modang, with HQ in Balikpapan
- 13th Armored Cavalry Squadron/Satya Lembuswana
- 13th Armored Cavalry Troop
- 18th Field Artillery Battalion/Komposit
- 2nd Air Defense Missile Artillery Battalion
- 17th Combat Engineers Battalion/Ananta Dharma
- 8th Combat Engineer Detachment/Gawi Manuntung

== See also ==
- Indonesian Army
