= Korem 092/Maharajalila =

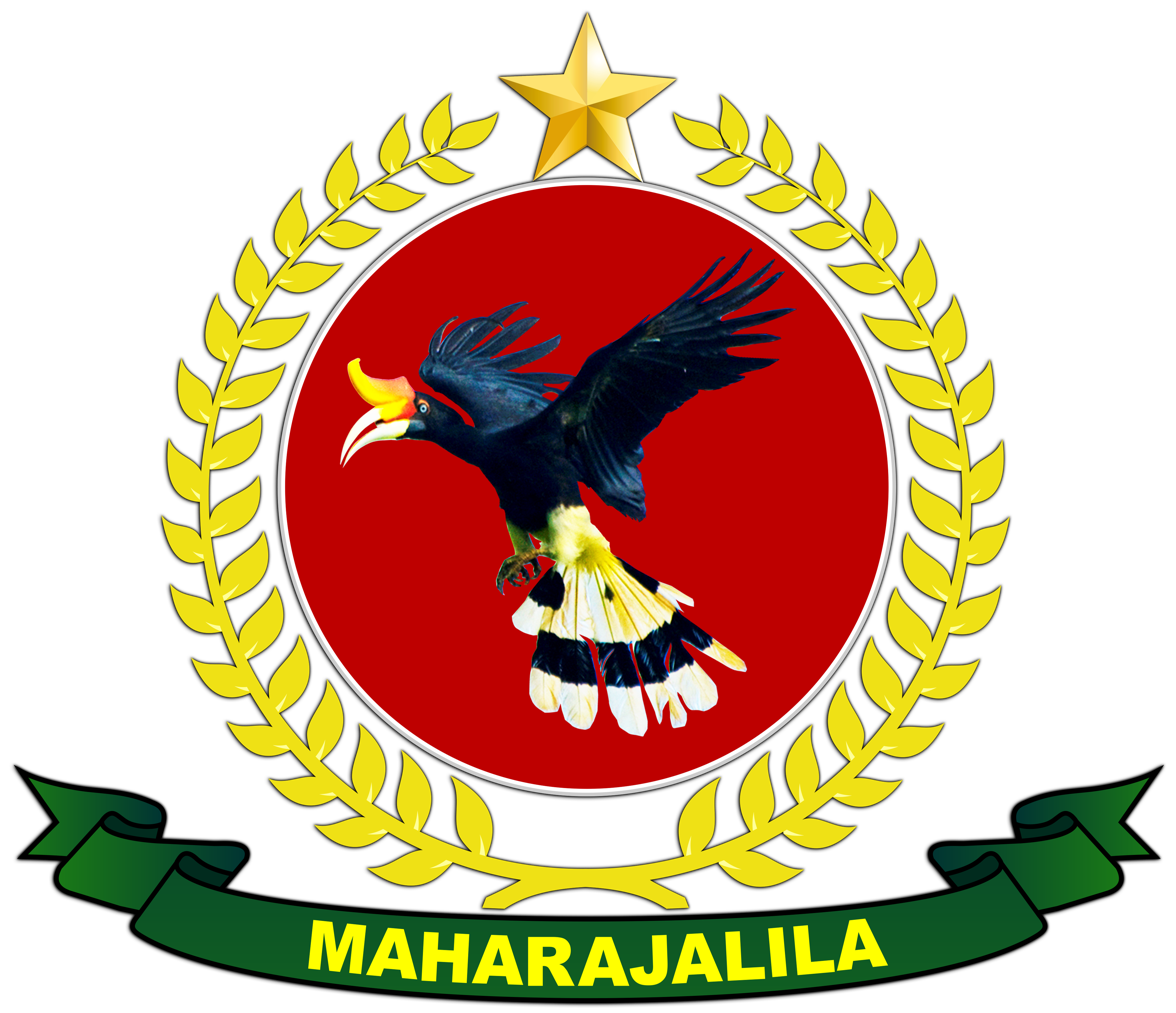
- Insignia of Korem 092/Maharajalila
- Active: 22 September 2019 - Present
- Country: Indonesia
- Branch: Kodam VI/Mulawarman
- Type: Military Area Command (KOREM)
- Garrison/HQ: Tanjung Selor, North Kalimantan
- Motto: "Maharajalila"

Korem 092/Maharajalila or Military Area Command 092nd/Maharajalila is a Military Area Command (Korem) under Kodam VI/Mulawarman. Its garrison located on Tanjung Selor, North Kalimantan. It was created following the separation of North Kalimantan province from East Kalimantan and becoming a new province. It consist of five Military District Commands (Kodim).

== Units ==
- Kodim 0903/Tanjung Selor
- Kodim 0907/Tarakan
- Kodim 0910/Malinau
- Kodim 0911/Nunukan
- Kodim 0915/Tana Tidung
