= Kudungga =

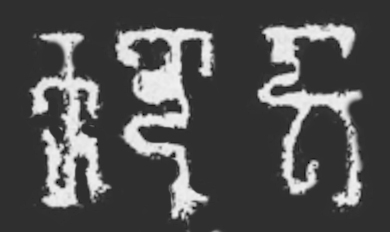
The name of the "Great King of Kings" Ku-ṇḍu-ṅga in the Brahmi script, in an inscription of his grandson Mulavarman, 5th century CE.

Location of Kutai in Indonesia.

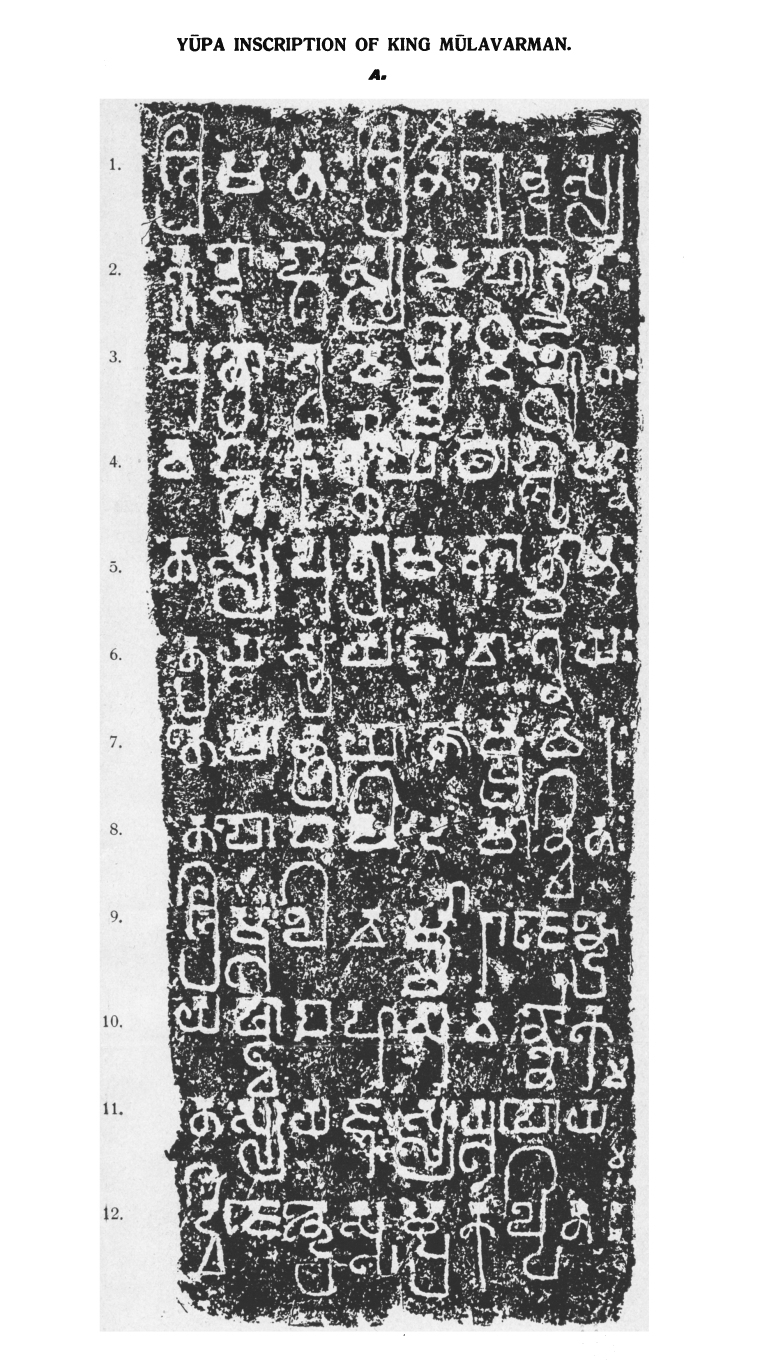
Mulavarman inscription, where he mentions his grandfather Ku-ṇḍu-ṅga (beginning of 2nd line).

Kudungga (read: "Ku-ṇḍu-ṅga", honorific title: Maharaja Kudungga Anumerta Devavarman) was the founder of the Kutai Martadipura kingdom who ruled around the year 350 AD or 4th century AD. Kudungga first ruled the kingdom of Kutai Martadipura as a community leader or chieftain (Dayak). During Kudungga's rule, Kutai Martadipura did not have a regular and systematical system of governance. By contrast, the latest claim said that Maharaja Kudungga was possibly a king from the ancient kingdom of Bakulapura in Tebalrung (now Tebalai Indah, Muara Kaman), and Asvavarman which was his son-in-law rather than his son, then became the first king of Kutai Martadipura.

== History ==
The discovery of the most reliable source stating that Kutai Martadipura is the oldest kingdom in the Nusantara archipelago were found in yupa inscriptions. Seven pieces of yupa were found in Muara Kaman. According to the results of a study conducted by J.G. de Casparis (1949), the yupas in Muara Kaman, which were allegedly a Kutai Martadipura civilization artifact, were found successively in 1879 and 1940.

In the yupas, there were inscriptions found written using the Pallava script in the Sanskrit language. Letters engraved on the yupa were thought to have come from the end of the 4th century or early 5th century AD. All of the monument stones were issued at the command of a leader named Maharaja Mulavarman Naladewa. Mulavarman was allegedly an Indianized name of the indigenous people because the name of his grandfather, namely Kudungga (there were also mentions of Kudunga or Kundungga) was the original name of an indigenous Indonesian. Kudungga was believed to be the forerunner of the first leader of the kingdom of Kutai Martadipura, while Mulavarman is the successor of Asvavarman (son of Kudungga) who brought the kingdom of Kutai Martadipura to glory.

R.M. Ng. Poerbatjaraka (1952) interpreted the circuit Pallava inscriptions in Sanskrit recorded on the yupas about the genealogy of the kings who had ruled in the early days of the kingdom of Kutai Martadipura in translation:

śrīmatah śrī-narendrasya; kuṇḍuṅgasya mahātmanaḥ; putro śvavarmmo vikhyātah; vaṅśakarttā yathāṅśumān; tasya putrā mahātmānaḥ; trayas traya ivāgnayaḥ; teṣān trayāṇām pravaraḥ; tapo-bala-damānvitaḥ; śrī mūlavarmmā rājendro; yaṣṭvā bahusuvarṇnakam; tasya yajñasya yūpo ‘yam; dvijendrais samprakalpitaḥ.

Translation:

Mahārāja (emperor) Kundungga, most noble, has a famous son, his name Aśwawarmman, who like Angśuman (the Sun God) cultivates a very noble family. The Aśwawarmman has three sons, like (sacred) fire. The prominent of the three sons is the Mūlawarmman, a king of good civil, strong and might. The Mūlawarmman held kenduri (salvation ceremony) with gold-very-much. For the memorial kenduri (salvation ceremony) that stone pillar was founded by the brahmanas.

From the inscriptions of the artifact above, it can be concluded that the first king of Kutai Martadipura was Kudungga. Kudungga had a son named Asvavarman who then passed the leadership of the kingdom of Kutai. Asvavarman had three children. Of the three children Aswawarman had, there was a child who was the most prominent, the child's name is Mulavarman who was the crown prince.

== Ancestry ==
=== Name Origin ===
The belief that Kudungga was an indigenous Indonesian person was based on the premise that Kudungga is clearly not an Indian name, although the names of his descendants, Aswawarman and Mulawarman, contained elements of Indian names. In this case, Poesponegoro and Notosusanto (1993) states that there is a name that is similar in Bugis, namely Kadungga. The resemblance of this name is not just a coincidence given in South Sulawesi also found several inscriptions similar to what is found in Kutai.

Poesponegoro and Notosusanto (1993) further concluded that the most likely theory was that both Kudungga who named his son Asvavarman, and Asvavarman himself named his son Mulavarman, eager to equate their degree and their ancestral alignment with the Ksahtriya caste in India. This possibility was based on the fact that the word "varman" is derived from Sanskrit, which was usually used as a suffix for the names of people in southern India. In the Hindu tradition that came from India, the social system of society is divided into classes, known as castes where members of the warrior caste (Kshatriyas) and the aristocratic/priestly caste (Brahmins) were treated highly .

=== Latest Claim ===
The latest claim came from the newly reestablished Kutai Mulawarman Kingdom (direct descendant of Sultanate of Kutai Kartanagara) in Indonesia, where Maharaja Kudungga was a king of Bakulapura in Tabalrung. Kudungga was the son of King Atwangga and King Atwangga was the son of Mitrongga, which was a descendant of Emperor Pushyamitra Shunga from the Shunga Empire in Magadha, India. During Kudungga's rule, Shunga Empire no longer existed, and his successor Ashvavarman, used the surname varman to state that his caste is Kshatriya. These claims however are one-sided, and unsubstantiated with no historical records proving Atwangga and Mitrongga ever existed.
