= Pallava script =

Brahmic writing system

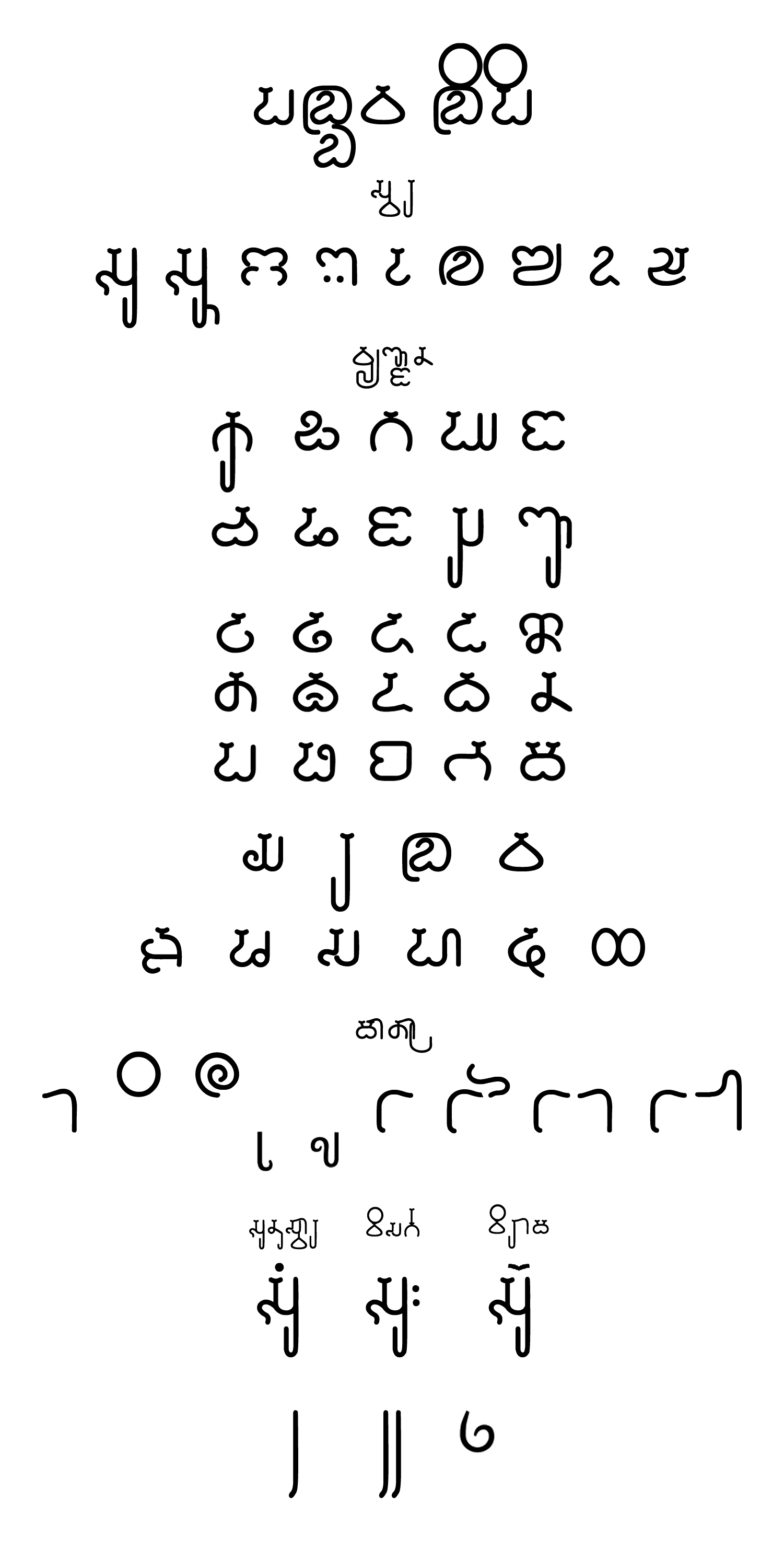
- Pallava script chart using a modern font, divided into 9 vowels, 35 consonants, 9 vowel diacritics, 3 special diacritics, and 3 punctuation marks.
- Script type: Abugida
- Period: 6th century AD to 8th century AD
- Direction: Left-to-right
- Languages: Old Tamil, Sanskrit, Telugu, Kannada, Konkani, Marathi, Old Khmer, Old Malay, Burmese, Thai, Sinhala, Lao, Mon, Balinese, etc.

Related scripts
- Parent systems: Egyptian hieroglyphs: Proto-Sinaitic; Phoenician; Aramaic; Brahmi; Tamil-Brahmi; Pallava script
- Child systems: Tamil, Grantha, Mon-Burmese, Khmer, Cham, Kawi
- Sister systems: Vattezhuthu, Kolezhuthu

The Pallava script, or Pallava Grantha, named after the Pallava dynasty of Southern India (Tamilakam), is attested since the 6th century AD. The Pallava script evolved from Tamil-Brahmi. It was used to originally write Old Tamil and Sanskrit texts – the court languages of Pallavas, thus, it features glyphs to render the sounds of both languages. Both the Tamil script via the intermediate script/step called Chozha-Pallava-Script and Grantha script have originated from the Pallava script.

Pallava also spread to Southeast Asia and evolved into scripts such as Balinese, Baybayin, Javanese, Kawi, Khmer, Lanna, Lao, Mon–Burmese, New Tai Lue, Sundanese, and Thai. This script is the sister of the Vatteluttu script which was also used to write Tamil and Malayalam in the past.

Epigrapher Arlo Griffiths argues that the name of the script is misleading as not all of the relevant scripts referred to have a connection with the Pallava dynasty. He instead advocates that these scripts be called Late Southern Brāhmī scripts.

== History ==
During the rule of the Pallavas, the script accompanied priests, monks, scholars, and traders into Southeast Asia. Pallavas developed the Pallava script based on Tamil-Brahmi. The main characteristics of the newer script are aesthetically matched and fuller consonant glyphs, similarly visible in the writing systems of Chalukya, Kadamba, and Vengi at the time of Ikshvakus. Brahmi's design was slightly different from the scripts of Cholas, Pandyas, and Cheras. Pallava script was the first significant development of Brahmi in India, combining rounded and rectangular strokes and adding typographical effects, and was suitable for civic and religious inscriptions.

It served as parent script for several modern-day-scripts, such as Chozha-Pallava-Script, which ultimately gave rise to Tamil script and also Grantha script. Once the Pallava dynasty was integrated via the conquest by Aditya I in 897 AD, which laid the foundation for the future Chola Empire – the Chozha-Pallava was subsequently developed under that dynasty and replaced both the Pallava and Grantha scripts to write Tamil texts, whereas Grantha remained to be in usage for rendering Manipravalam texts. It also supplanted the Vatteluttu, when the Pandya Nadu in c. 850 AD was conquered by the Cholas as well. The Chozha-Pallava script resembled the same glyph developments like its counterpart Grantha script, but it didn't feature any foreign sounds from Sanskrit, thus, simplifying the script and ultimately becoming the modern-day Tamil script.

Kadamba-Pallava script evolved into early forms of Kannada and Telugu scripts. Glyphs become more rounded and incorporate loops because of writing upon leaves and paper.

The script is not yet a part of Unicode but proposals have been made to include it. In 2018, Anshuman Pandey made a proposal.

== Characteristics ==
The form shown here is based on examples from the 7th century AD. Letters labeled * have uncertain sound value, as they have little occurrence in Southeast Asia.

=== Consonants ===
The word "Pallava" written in modern Pallava font

Each consonant has an inherent /a/, which will be sounded if no vowel sign is attached. If two consonants follow one another without intervening vowel, the second consonant is made into a subscript form, and attached below the first.

ka	kha	ga	gha	ṅa
ca	cha	ja	jha*	ña
ṭa	ṭha*	ḍa	ḍha*	ṇa
ta	tha	da	dha	na
pa	pha	ba	bha	ma
ya	ra	la	va	
śa	ṣa	sa	ha	

=== Independent vowels ===
a	ā	i	ī	u	e	o	ai*	au*

== Examples ==
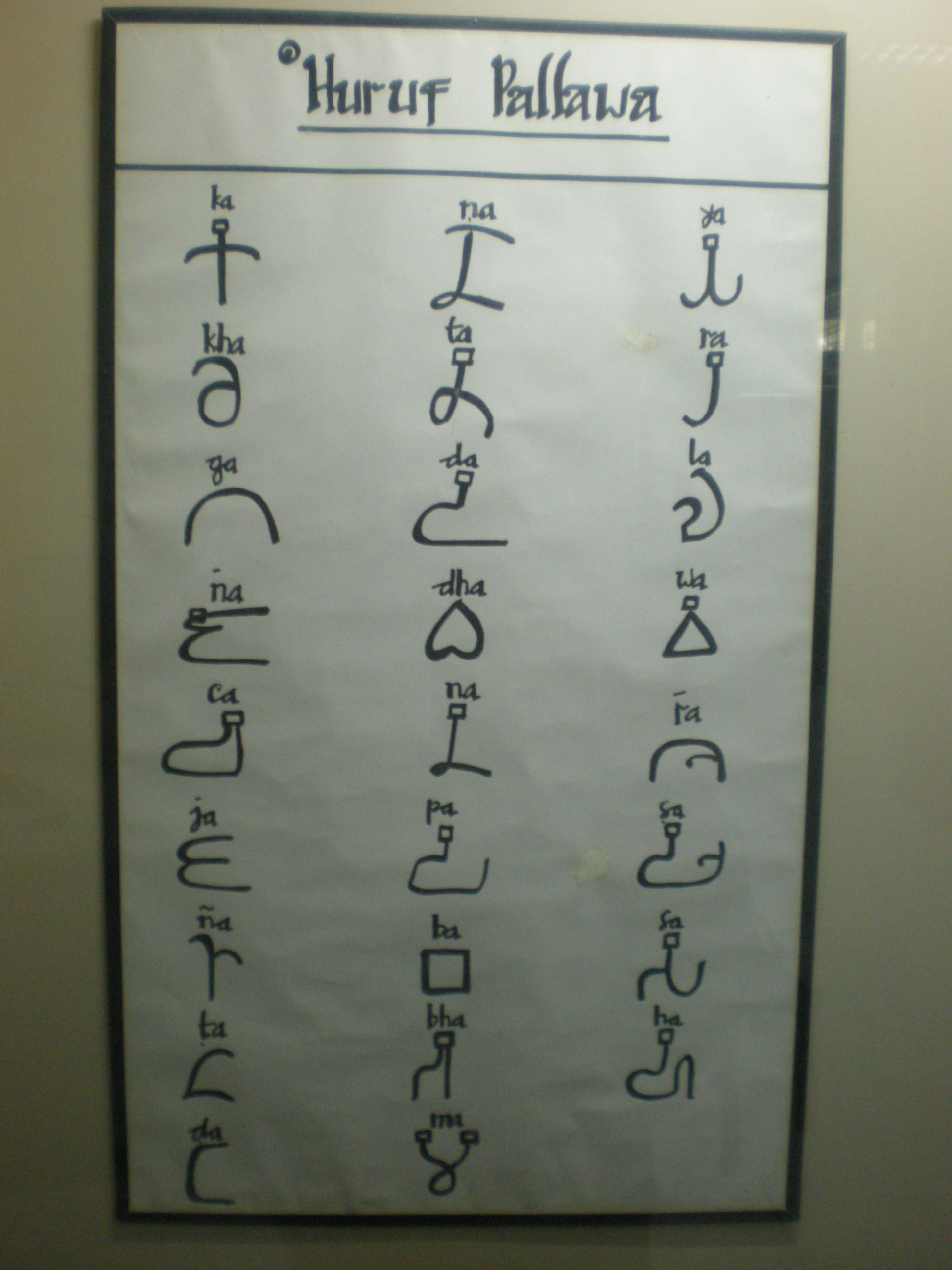
Kadamba-Pallava script

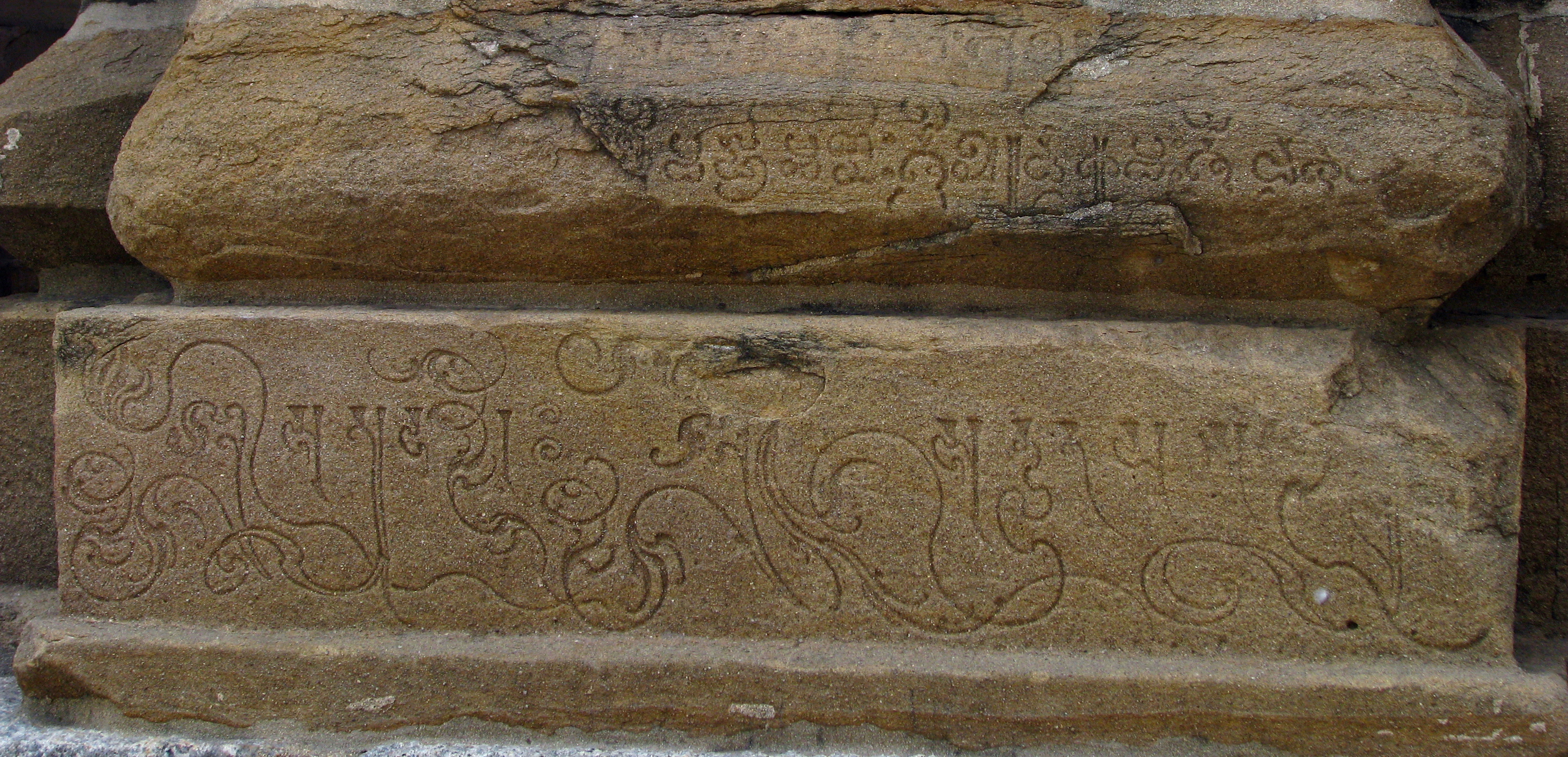
Pallava script at the 8th century Kailasanatha temple in Kanchipuram, Tamil Nadu.

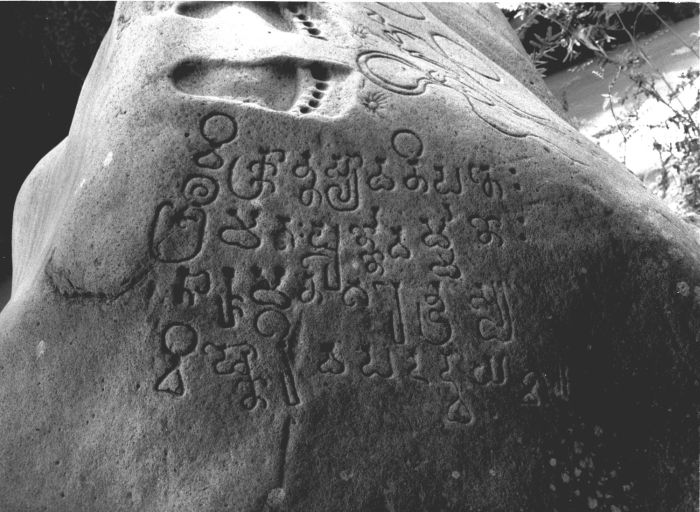
The Ciaruteun inscription, a 5th-century Pallava stone inscription discovered in Indonesia

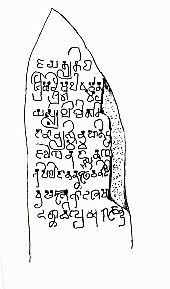
One of the oldest inscriptions discovered in Indonesia, the Yūpa inscriptions of King Mulavarman, king of Kutai Martadipura written in the 4th century AD

== Unicode ==
A proposal to encode the script in Unicode was submitted in 2018.

== Bibliography ==
- Sivaramamurti, C, Indian Epigraphy and South Indian Scripts. Bulletin of the Madras Government Museum. Chennai 1999
