= Yūpa =

Vedic sacrificial pillar

Yūpa
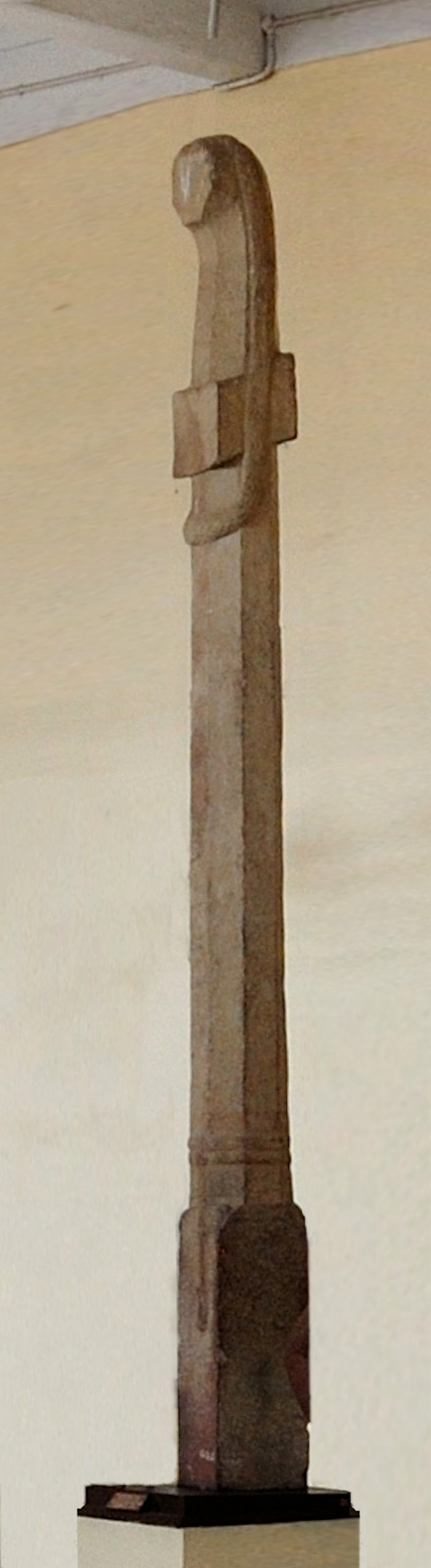
Yūpa sacrificial pillar of the time of Vasishka, third century CE, Isapur, near Mathura; Mathura Museum.

A yūpa (यूप), or yūpastambha, was a Vedic sacrificial pillar used in Ancient India. It is one of the most important elements of the Vedic rituals for animal sacrifice.

The execution of a victim (generally an animal), who was tied at the yūpa, was meant to bring prosperity to everyone.

Most yūpa, and all from the Vedic period, were in wood, and have not survived. The few stone survivals seem to be a later type of memorial using the form of the wooden originals. The Isapur yūpa, the most complete, replicates in stone the rope used to tether the animal. The topmost section is missing; texts describe a "wheel-like headpiece made of perishable material", representing the sun, but the appearance of that is rather unclear from the Gupta period coins that are the best other visual evidence.

== Isapur Yūpa ==
The Isapur Yūpa, now in the Mathura Museum, was found at Isapur in the vicinity of Mathura, and has an inscription in the name of the third century CE Kushan ruler Vāsishka, and mentions the erection of the Yūpa pillar for a sacrificial session.

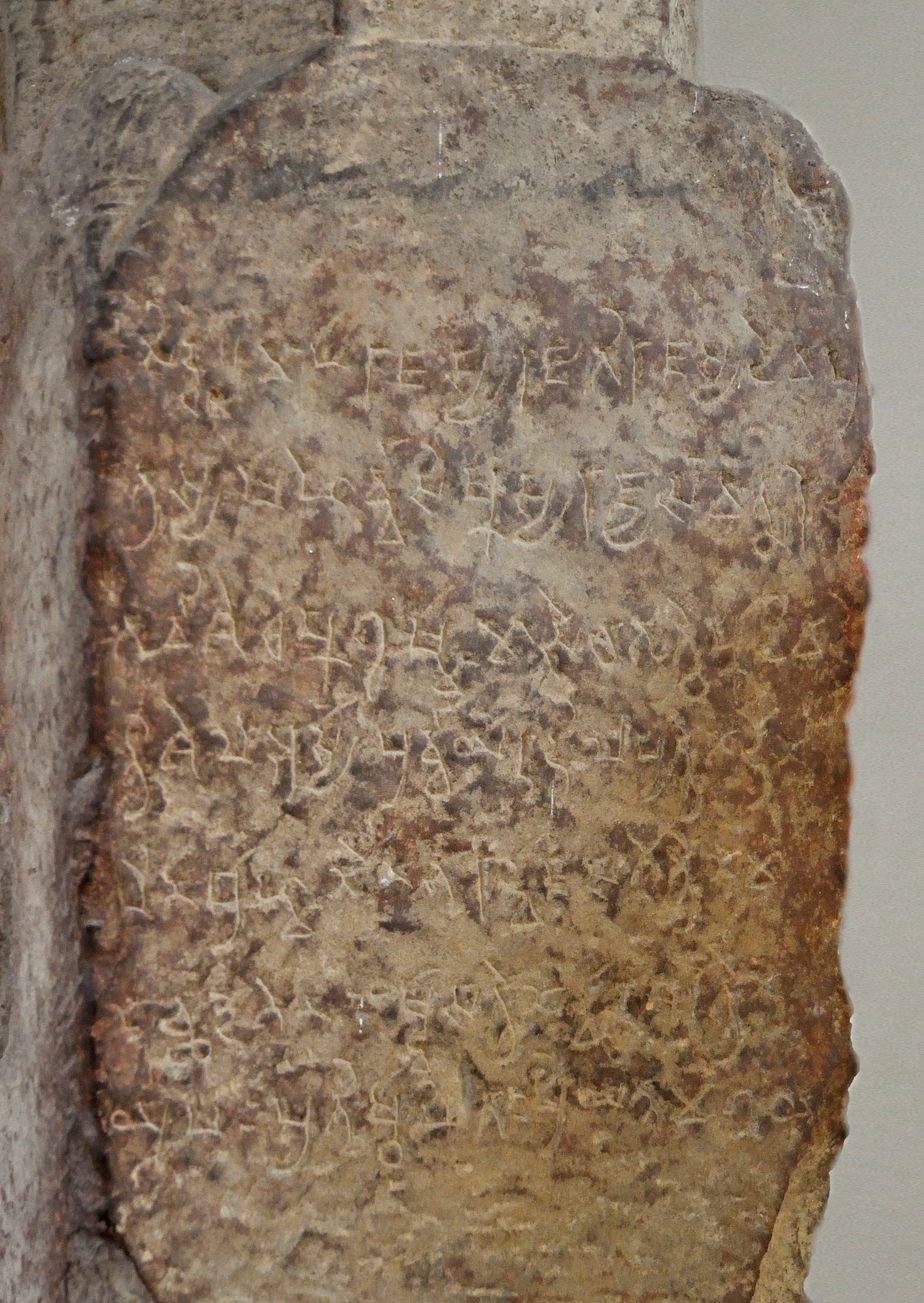
Vāsishka inscription on the Isapur Yūpa.

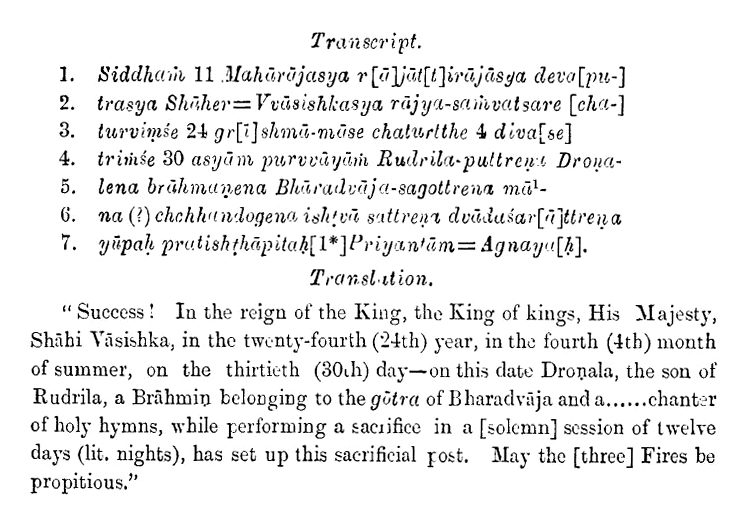
Translation of the inscription mentioning the usage of the sacrificial pillar.

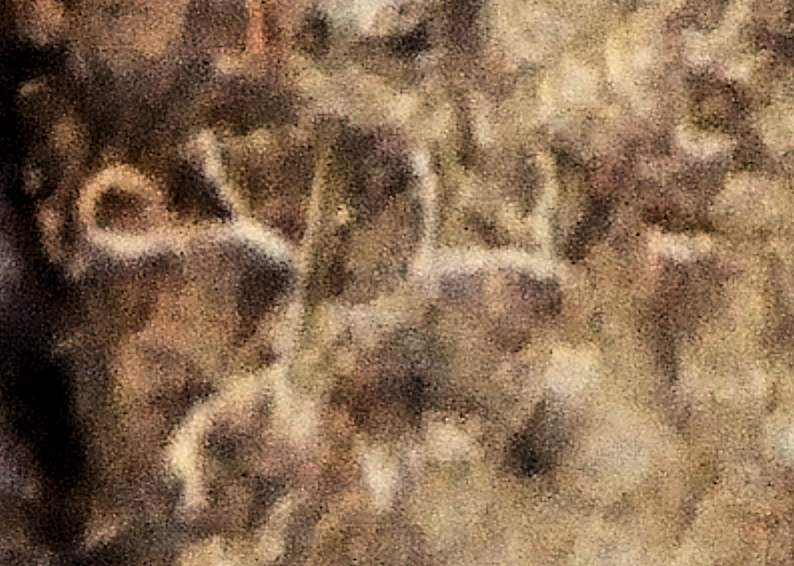
The word "Yūpaḥ" (𑁊) in Brahmi script in the Isapur pillar inscription.

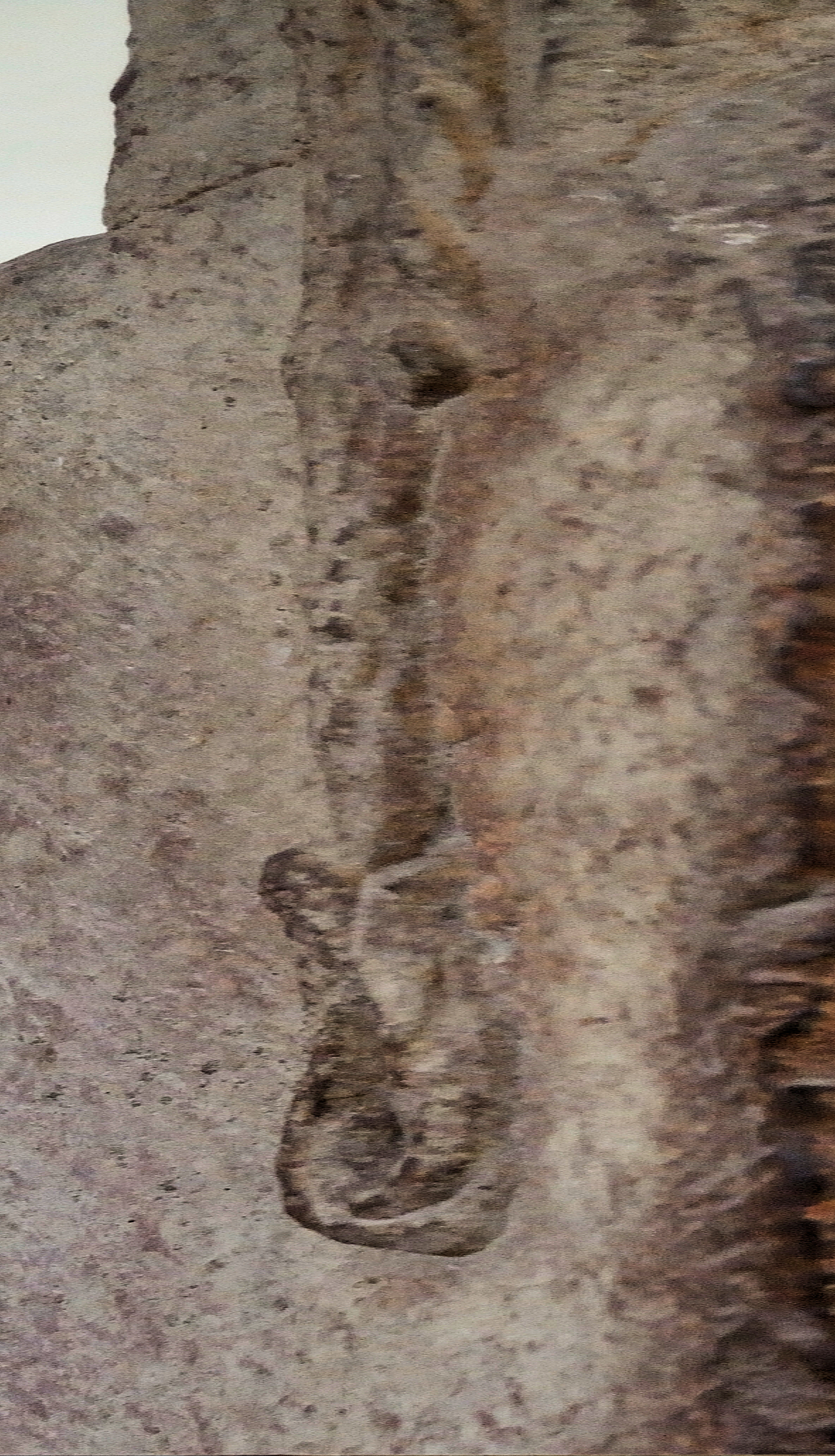
Isapur Yūpa with sculpture of a rope and noose to be tied to the sacrificial animal.

== Yūpa in coinage ==
During the Gupta Empire period, the Ashvamedha scene of a horse tied to a yūpa sacrificial post appears on the coinage of Samudragupta. On the reverse, the queen is holding a chowrie for the fanning of the horse and a needle-like pointed instrument, with legend "One powerful enough to perform the Ashvamedha sacrifice".

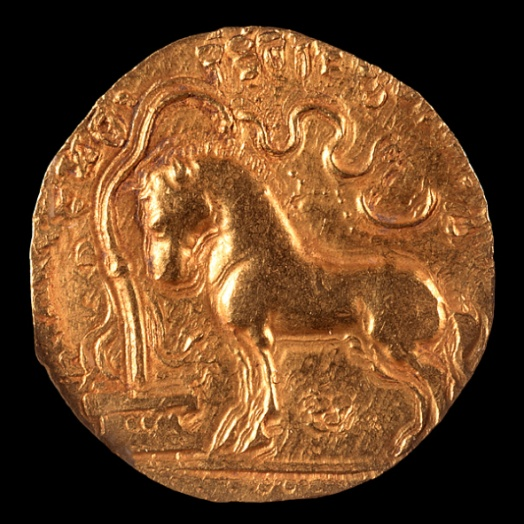
Samudragupta coin with horse standing in front of a yūpa sacrificial post, with legend "The King of Kings, who had performed the Ashvamedha sacrifice, wins heaven after conquering the earth".

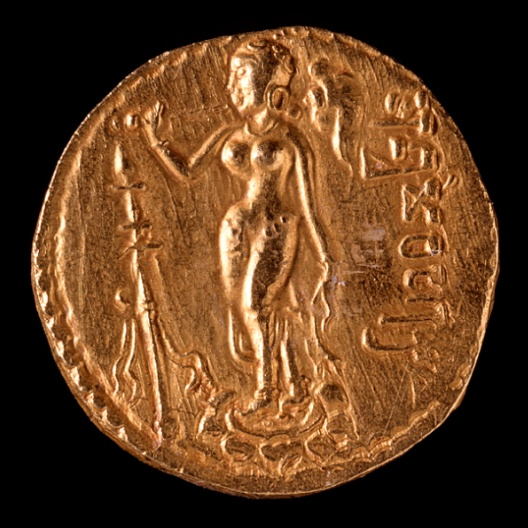
The queen, reverse of last, is holding a chowrie for the fanning of the horse and a needle-like pointed instrument, with legend "One powerful enough to perform the Ashvamedha sacrifice".

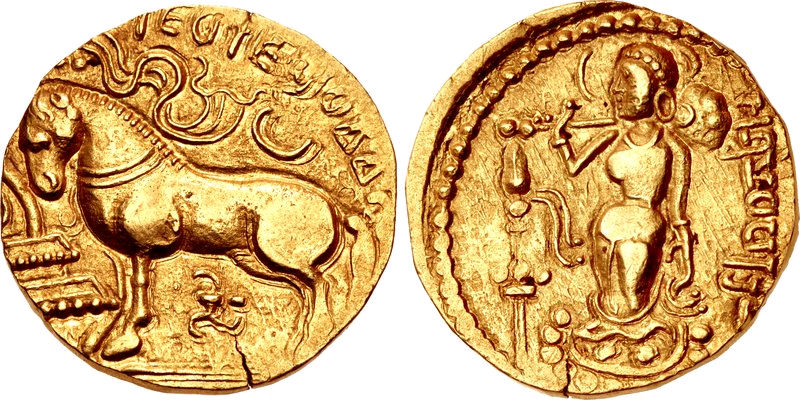
Another version of the Ashvamedha scene. Coinage of Samudragupta.

== Yūpa inscription in Indonesia ==
The oldest known Sanskrit inscriptions in the Nusantara are those on seven stone pillars, or Yūpa ("sacrificial posts"), found in the eastern part of Borneo, in the historical area of Kutai, East Kalimantan province. They were written by Brahmins using the early Pallava script, in the Sanskrit language, to commemorate sacrifices held by a generous mighty king called Mulavarman who ruled the Kutai Martadipura Kingdom, the first Hindu kingdom in present Indonesia. Based on palaeographical grounds, they have been dated to the second half of the 4th century CE. They attest to the emergence of an Indianized state in the Indonesian archipelago prior to 400 CE.

In addition to Mulavarman, the reigning king, the inscriptions mention the names of his father Aswawarman and his grandfather Kudungga (the founder of the Kutai Martadipura Kingdom). Aswawarman is the first of the line to bear a Sanskrit name in the Yupa which indicates that he was probably the first to adhere to Hinduism.

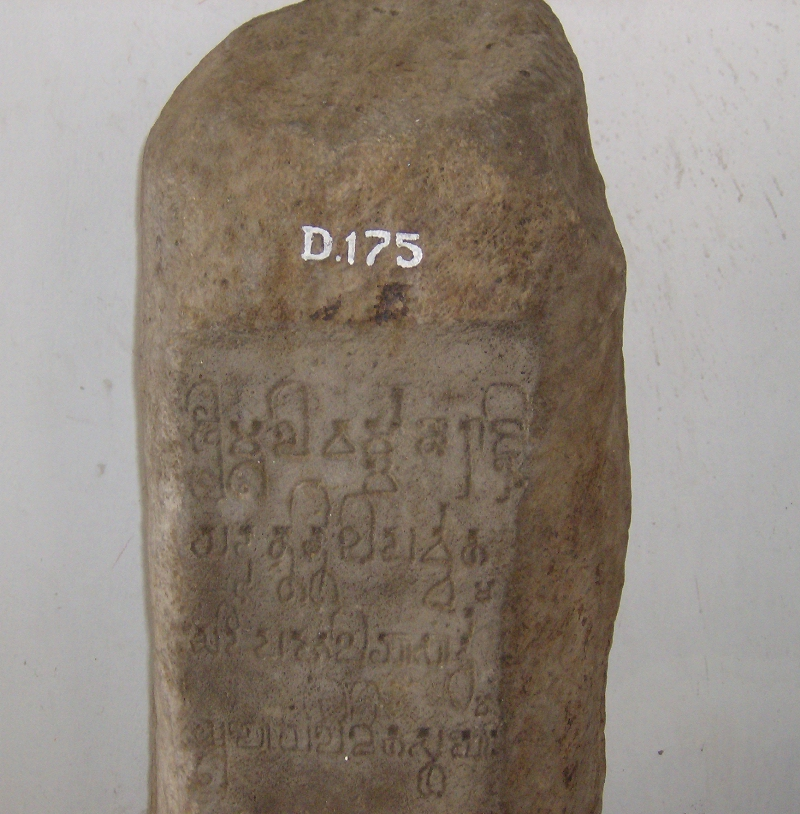
One of the yūpa Mulavarman inscriptions from Kutai, at the National Museum in Jakarta

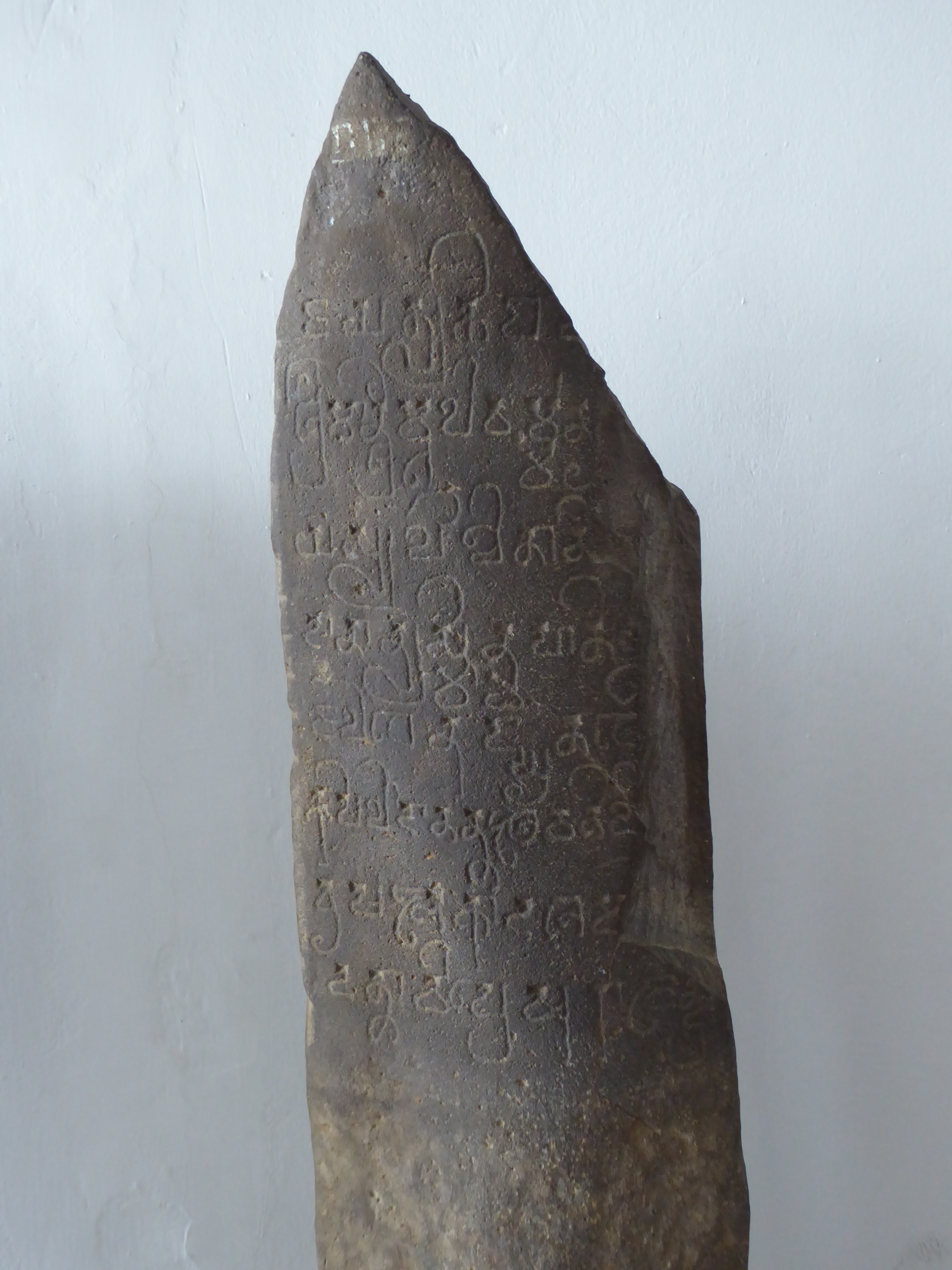
Mulavarman inscription on a yūpa, 5th century CE

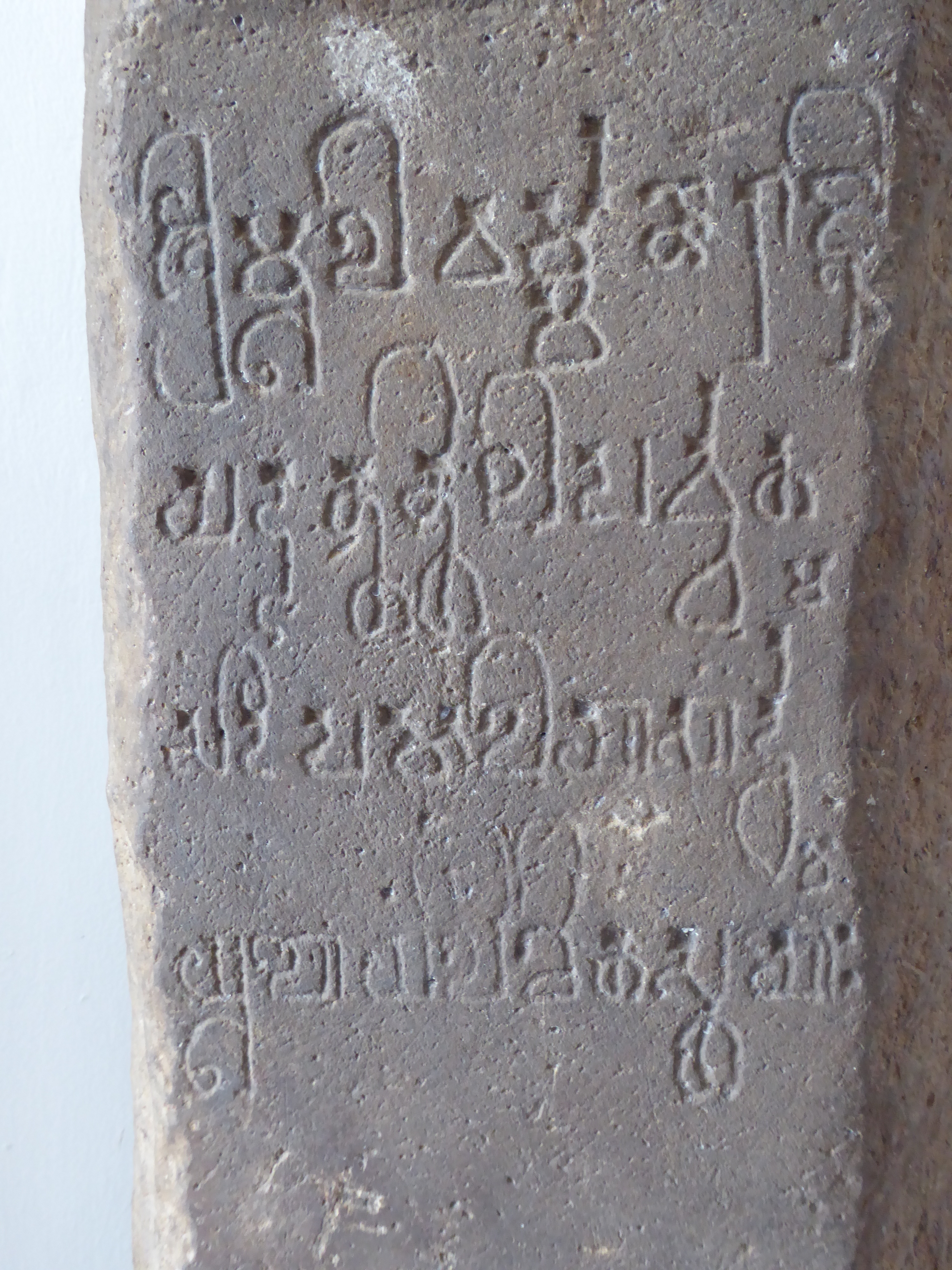
Mulavarman inscription on a yūpa, 5th century CE

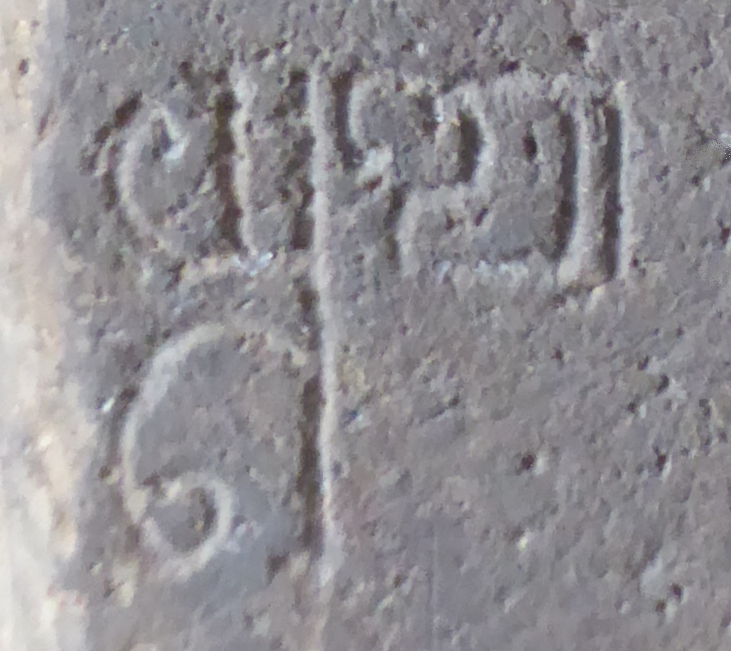
The word "Yūpo" in Brahmi in a Mulavarman Inscription, Muara Kaman, Kalimantan, 5th century CE

=== Text ===
The four Yupa inscriptions founded are classified as "Muarakaman"s and has been translated by language experts as follows:

Muarakaman I
srimatah sri-narendrasya,
kundungasya mahatmanah,
putro svavarmmo vikhyatah,
vansakartta yathansuman,
tasya putra mahatmanah,
trayas traya ivagnayah,
tesan trayanam pravarah,
tapo-bala-damanvitah,
sri mulawarmma rajendro,
yastva bahusuvarnnakam,
tasya yajnasya yupo 'yam,
dvijendrais samprakalpitah.

Muarakaman II
srimato nrpamukhyasya
rajnah sri-mulawarmmanah
danam punyatame ksetre
yad dattam vaprakesvare
dvijatibhyo' gnikalpebhyah.
vinsatir ggosahasrikam
tansya punyasya yupo 'yam
krto viprair ihagataih.

Muarakaman III
srimad-viraja-kirtteh
rajnah sri-mulavarmmanah punyam
srnvantu vipramukhyah
ye canye sadhavah purusah
bahudana-jivadanam
sakalpavrksam sabhumidanan ca
tesam punyagananam
yupo 'yan stahapito vipraih

Muarakaman V
sri-mulavarmmano rajnah
yad dattan tilla-parvvatam
sadipa-malaya sarddham
yupo 'yam likhitas tayoh

=== Translation ===
Translation according to the Indonesia University of Education:

Muarakaman I
The Maharaja Kudungga, who was very noble, had a famous son, the Aswawarman his name, who like the Ansuman (the sun god) grew a very noble family. The Aswawarman had three sons, like three (holy) fire. The foremost of the three sons was the Mulavarman, a king who was civilized, strong and powerful. The Mulavarman has held a feast (salvation called) a lot of gold. For commemoration of the feast (salvation) that this stone monument was erected by the brahmins.

Muarakaman II
The Mulavarman, the noble and eminent king, has given alms of 20,000 cows to the brahmins who is like fire, (located) in the holy land (named) Waprakeswara. For (remembrance) of the kindness of the king, this monument has been made by the Brahmins who came to this place.

Muarakaman III
Listen to all of you, eminent Brahmins, and all other good people, about the virtues of the Mulavarman, the great king who is very noble. This kindness is in the form of a lot of alms, as if the alms of life or just a kalpa tree (which gives all desires), with land alms (which is given). It is with this goodness that this monument was erected by the Brahmins (for a memorial).

Muarakaman V
This monument was written for (commemorating) two (cases) that have been donated by King Mulavarman, namely a mountain of oil (thick), with lamps and flower panicles.

The Yupas are now kept in the National Museum of Indonesia in Jakarta.
