= Kutai =

Historical region in East Kalimantan, Indonesia

The former Special Region of Kutai as part of Indonesian Borneo.

Kutai is a historical region in what is now the Indonesian province of East Kalimantan on the island of Borneo. The region shares its name with the native ethnic group of the region (known as Urang Kutai 'the Kutai people'), with a total population around 300,000, who have their own language known as the Kutainese language which accompanies their own rich history.

The Kutai Martadipura Kingdom (399–1635) was the earliest Hindu kingdom in the East Indies. It was later succeeded by the Muslim sultanate of Kutai Kartanegara (1300–1844). Today, the name is preserved in the names of three regencies in East Kalimantan province which are the Kutai Kartanegara Regency, the West Kutai Regency and East Kutai Regency with the major river flowing in the heart of the region known as the Mahakam River. This historical region also included the cities of Samarinda (the capital city of East Kalimantan), Balikpapan, Bontang, and other smaller settlements inside such as Tenggarong (historically served as the royal capital), Sangatta, and as far south as Nusantara and Penajam.

== Kutai Martapura Kingdom ==
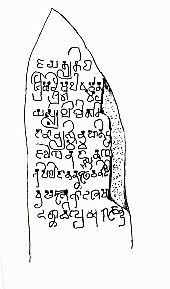
An ancient yūpa of Mulawarman, king of Kutai

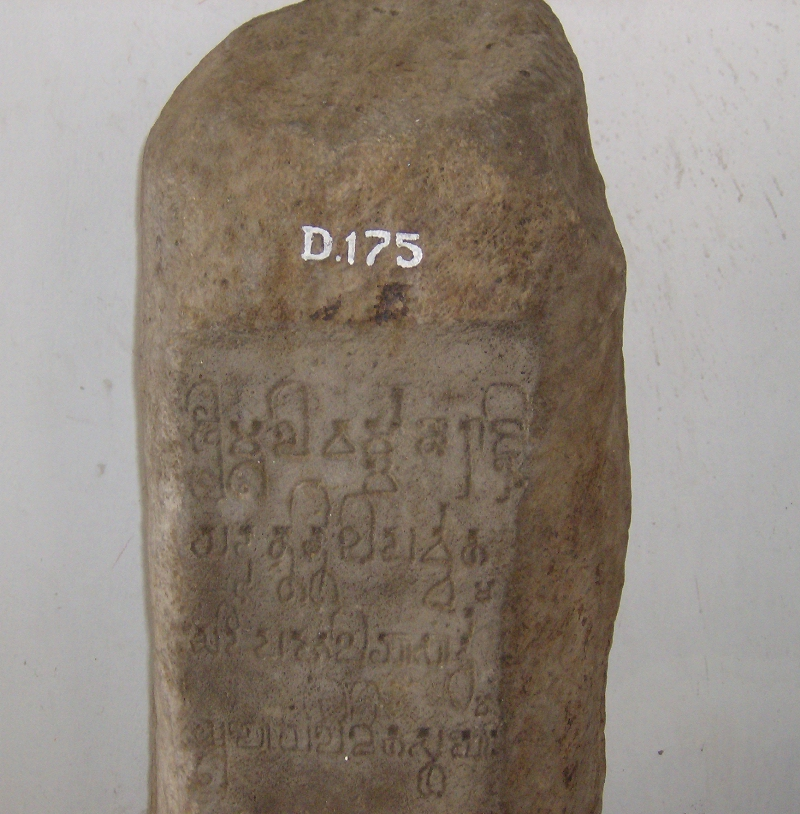
A yūpa with inscription in the National Museum of Indonesia in Jakarta

The Kutai Martapura Kingdom (399–1635; locally known as Kerajaan Kutai Martapura) is a 4th-century Hindu kingdom located in the Kutai area, East Kalimantan. Its capital is believed to be the current Muara Kaman district located in Kutai Kartanegara Regency and is one of the earliest kingdoms in Indonesian history. Muara Kaman district which is currently one of the many districts in Kutai Kartanegara Regency is proven to be the place where the capital of the kingdom once stood, it is proven by an ancient remnant of a megalith stone known as Lesong Batu, believed to have been used to make the yūpa inscriptions during the 4th century. The seven stone pillars, or yūpa ('sacrificial posts'), have been found in Kutai, Kaman Estuary, near the Mahakam River. The plinths bear an inscription in the Indic Pallava script, reading "a gift to the Brahmin priests" in Sanskrit. The style of the script has been dated to the last half the 4th century. It is believed these religions were brought to Indonesia around the 2nd and 4th centuries, respectively, when Indian traders arrived on the islands of Sumatra, Java and Sulawesi.

The names of three rulers are known from the inscriptions. The first ruler mentioned is Kudungga, the 'lord of men' (narendra), his son Aśwawarman, styled the 'founder of the dynasty' (vaṇśa-kartṛ) and grandson of the first and son of the later, Mulavarman called the 'lord of kings' (rājendra). As the name "Kuṇḍungga" does not seem to be a name of Sanskrit-Hinduistic origin while the other two are, it is presumed he was a leader of local origin (Dayak people) and it was his son Aśwawarman that adopted the Hinduistic belief. as Dayak people back then lived in the inner jungle parts of Borneo not in the coastal areas, while others argued that the name is similar to bugis name of Kadungga, with several inscriptions similar to what is found in Kutai were found in Sulawesi. However, scientists and historians from the Dutch East Indies era to the Republic of Indonesia era concluded that the name Kundungga was the original name of Indonesian people from within Kalimantan, who had not been influenced by Indian culture.

During the reign of King Mūlawarman, he is the one who let the yūpa inscriptions be made, and it was believed to be made by the Brahmins which received alms from Mulavarman. While nothing of the military actions of his two predecessors is known, Raja Mūlawarman is stated to have conquered his neighbors in battle. He is also said to have increased the land of Kutai by a Vedic ritual known as the "Ashvamedha", a ritual also performed by Indian rulers of the past. This ritual required a horse released to his land. The footsteps of the freely roaming horse were taken as evidence that this land belonged to his kingdom. Mulawarman was also known for his tribute of gold to his God. The name of his kingdom is not mentioned on the inscriptions nor do any other documents in other countries relate to a kingdom at this time in this region. It is not known what became of the kingdom after these pillars had been erected. It may be possible that the name Kutai, as in Tuñjung Kute of the 1365 Javanese Majapahit poem "Nagarakretagama" is as ancient and reflects the original name used a thousand years earlier.

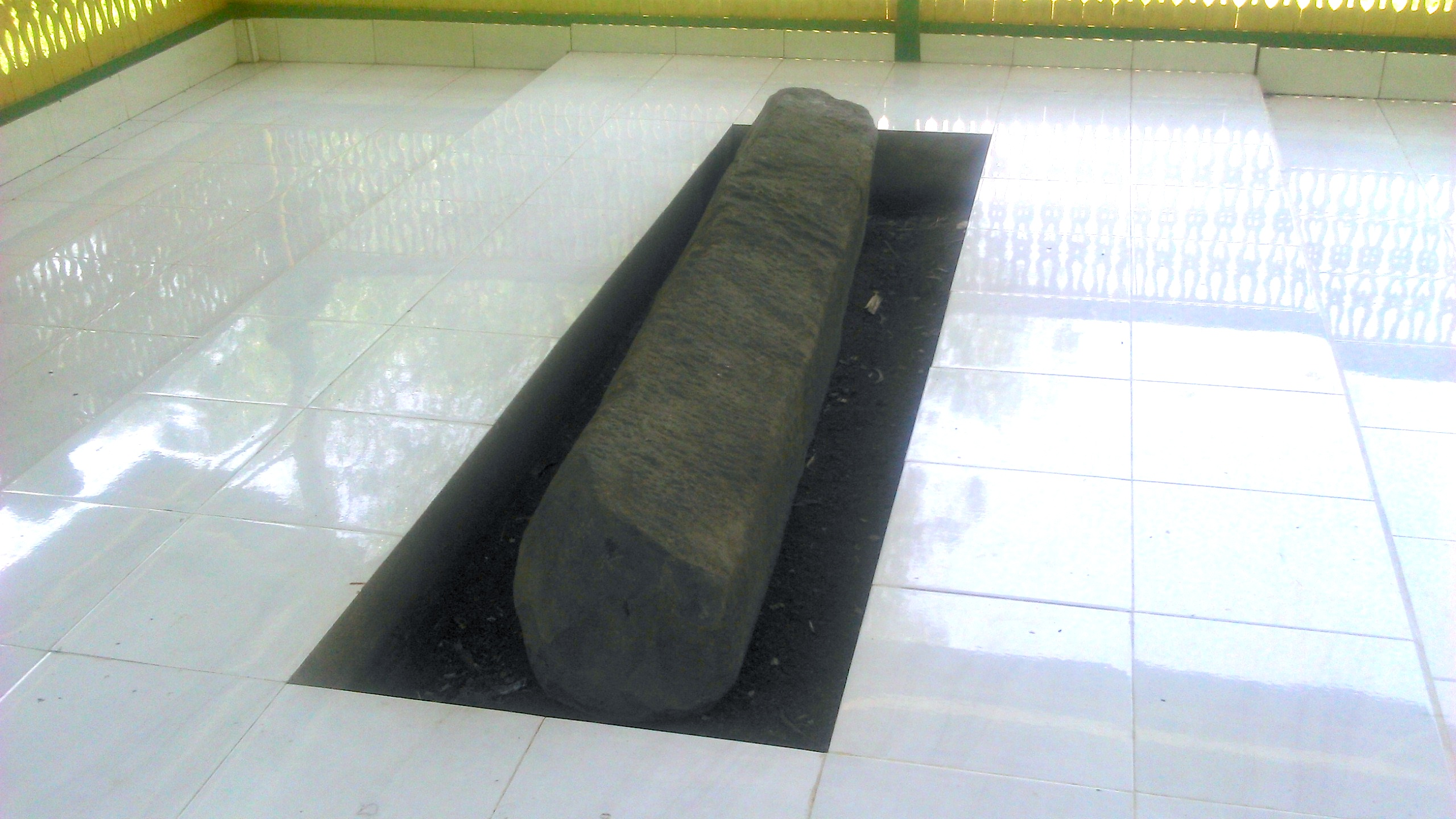
The Lesong Batu megalith, located in Muara Kaman district

The Lesong Batu is a megalith stone located in Muara Kaman district, Kutai Kartanegara Regency believed to be the remnants to make yūpa inscriptions during the 4th century.

== Sultanate of Kutai Kartanegara ==
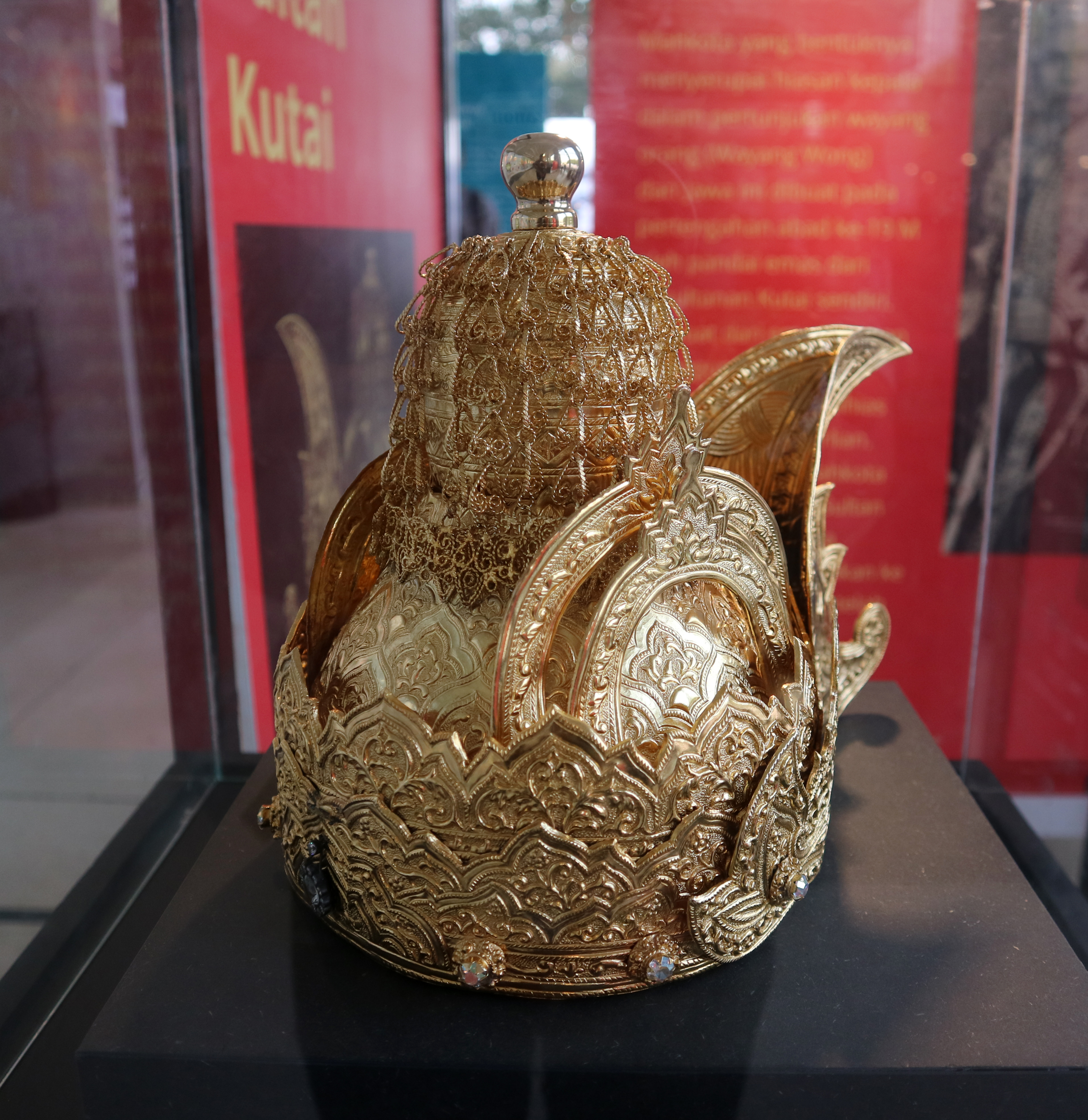
The golden crown of Kutai Sultan, part of the regalia of Kutai Kartanegara Sultanate. Collection of the National Museum of Indonesia, Jakarta.

The Kutai Kartanegara Sultanate (1300–1844; locally known as Kesultanan Kutai Kertanegara ing Martadipura) was established around the end of the 13th century in the region of Tepian Batu or Kutai Lama. The first known ruler is known to be Aji Batara Agung Dewa Sakti, who was thought to have ruled from 1300 to 1325. Aji Pangeran Sinum Panji Mendapa, who ruled 1635–1650, was able to conquer the kingdom of Kutai Martadipura and merged the two realms thus becoming "Kutai Kartanegara Ing Martadipura".

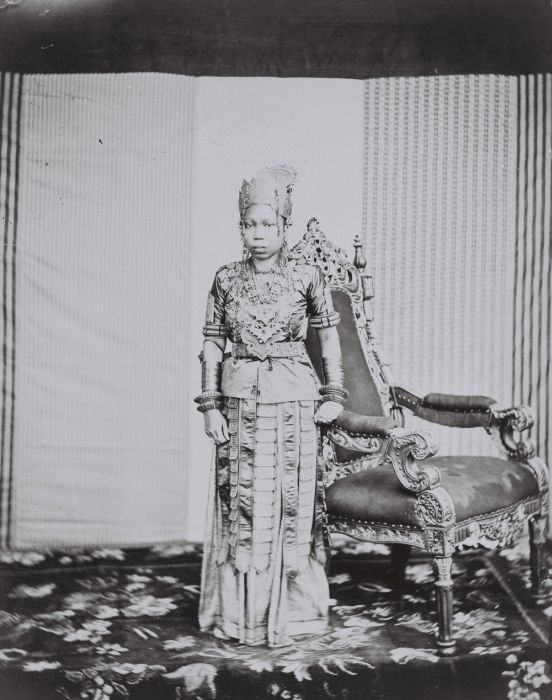
Portrait of the Crown Princess of Kutai, wife of the later Sultan Ali Muhammad Alimuddin, in bridal wear

In 1732, the Kutai Kertanegara Kingdom moved its capital from Old Kutai to Jembayan. This moment functioned Samarinda as a port city or market city of the Kutai Sultanate.

Islam took hold in the region since the 17th century (most of the Bugis were Muslims) and Aji Muhammad Idris, ruling 1732–1739?, was the first ruler to have an Islamic name.

After a civil war, Aji Muhammad Muslihuddin moved the capital in 1782 from Pemarangan to Tepian Pandan. The name of the capital city eventually developed from Tangga Arung to its present form of Tenggarong.

In 1844, following the repulse of James Erskine Murray's expedition and attempt to settle, the Dutch defeated the sultan Aji Muhammad Salehudin, forced him into exile, and took direct control of Kutai.

The Japanese invaded the region in 1942 and acknowledged a "Kooti Kingdom", that was a subject of the Tenno. In 1945 Kutai joined, along with its neighbours, into the East Kalimantan federation.

In 1949, Kutai became part of the United States of Indonesia.

== Contemporary governance ==
On 4 October 1999, the territory once belonging to the Sultanate of Kutai Kartanegara, until then composing the single Kutai Regency, was divided between a reduced Kutai Regency (renamed the Kutai Kartanegara Regency on 23 March 2002), new East Kutai and West Kutai regencies, and the independent city of Bontang; on 14 December 2012 the western districts of West Kutai Regency were split off to create a separate Mahakam Ulu Regency. Each regency was and is headed by a regent (known locally as Bupati) and forms a part of East Kalimantan|East Kalimantan. Meanwhile, the position of Sultan of Kutai Kartanegara still exists and resides in the Kutai Palace (Kedaton) in Tenggarong but administratively, the governance is conducted by the regional government of the Republic of Indonesia, not the sultanate. The Sultan holds an honorary status in Kutai and is highly respected by Kutai people. During the festival of Erau, he will be the guest of honour accompanied by the local government officials such as the governor of East Kalimantan and the Regent of Kutai Kartanegara.

== Kutai people ==
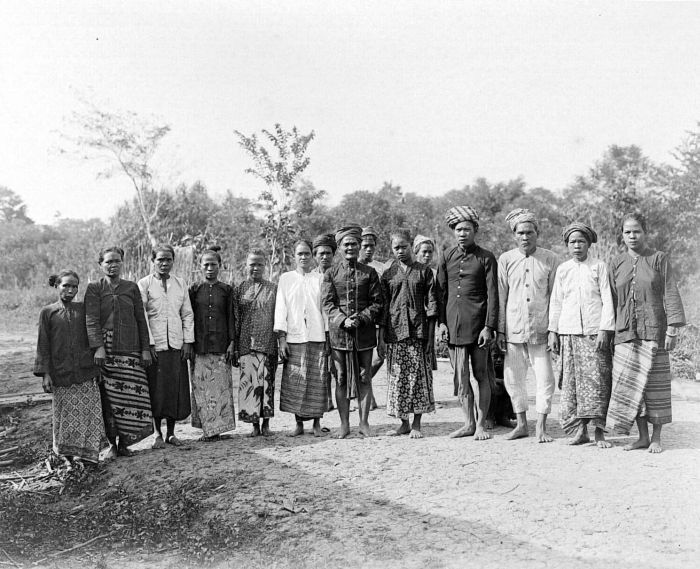
Kutai people

The Kutai people, or known locally as Urang Kutai is the ethnic group which their ancestors are believed to be descendants of the Dayak Ot Danum people that have already embraced Islam and currently live on the banks of the great Mahakam River, East Kalimantan. They are native to the city of Tenggarong, Kutai Kartanegara Regency, the West and the East Kutai regencies.

== See also ==
- Kutai National Park
