= Military beret =

Berets as part of a military uniform

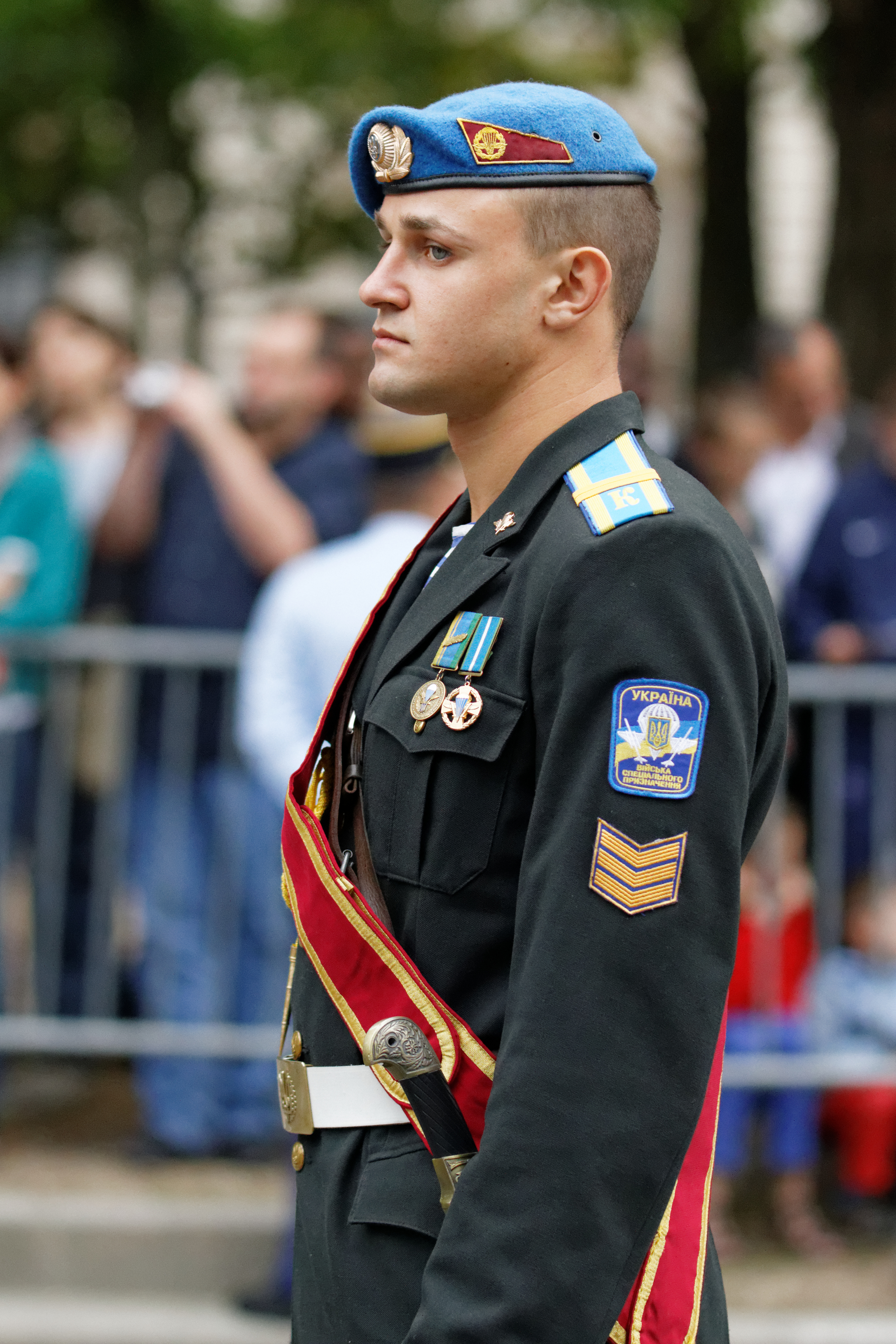
A Ukrainian military cadet in a light blue beret, formerly for Ukrainian DShV.

Troops began wearing berets as a part of the headgear of military uniforms in some European countries during the 19th century; since the mid-20th century, they have become a component of the uniforms of many armed forces throughout the world. Military berets are usually pushed to the right to free the shoulder that bears the rifle on most soldiers, but the armies of some countries, mostly within Europe, South America, and Asia, have influenced the push to the left (i.e. "French pull").

In many countries, berets have become associated with elite units, who often wear berets in specific colours. For instance, the maroon beret is mostly traditional headgear for airborne forces around the world, with a few exceptions—for example, the Russian Airborne Troops, who wear a sky-blue beret, and the Portuguese Paratroopers who wear a green beret.

== History ==
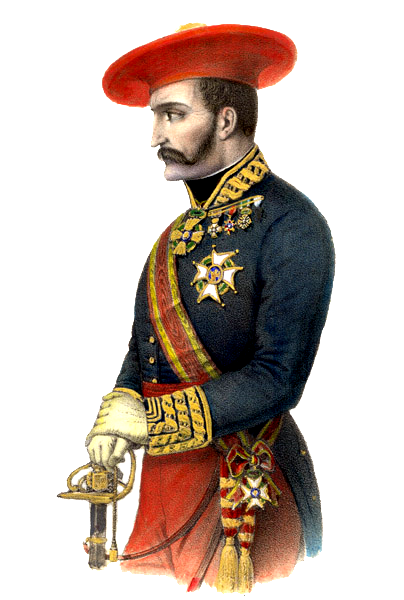
Spanish General Tomás de Zumalacárregui, with his red beret in 1845

The use of beret-like headgear as a civilian headdress dates back hundreds of years, an early example being the Scottish Blue Bonnet, which became a de facto symbol of Scottish Jacobite forces in the 16th and 17th centuries. Berets themselves were first used as a military headdress in the 1830s during the First Carlist War in Spain, where they were said to have been imported from the South of France by Liberal forces, but were made famous by the opposing General Tomás de Zumalacárregui, who sported a white or red beret with a long tassel, which came to be an emblem of the Carlist cause.

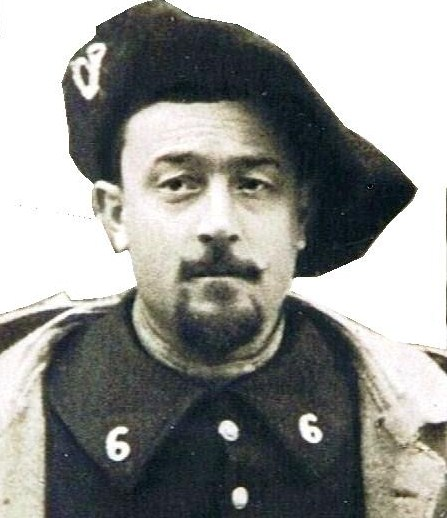
A French chasseur alpin in World War I, with his distinctive large beret

The French Chasseurs alpins, created in the early 1880s, were the first regular unit to wear the military beret as a standard headgear. These mountain troops were issued with a uniform which included several features which were innovative for the time, notably the large and floppy blue beret which they still retain. This was so unfamiliar a fashion outside France that it had to be described in the Encyclopædia Britannica of 1911 as "a soft cap or tam o'shanter".

Berets are used widely by the military; they are cheap, easy to make in large numbers, can be manufactured in a wide range of colors encouraging esprit de corps, can be rolled up and stuffed into a pocket or beneath the shirt epaulette without damage, and can be worn with headphones.

The beret was found particularly practical as a uniform for armored vehicle crews; the British Royal Tank Regiment adopted a black beret which would not show oil stains and was officially approved in 1924. German Panzertruppen also adopted a black beret or Schutzmütze in 1934, which included a rubber skull cap as head protection inside.

The wearing of berets of distinctive colors by elite special forces originated with the British Parachute Regiment, whose maroon beret was officially approved in July 1942, followed by the Commando Forces whose green beret was approved in October of that year. The United States Army Special Forces adopted a darker green beret in 1955, although it was not officially approved until 1961.

== By country ==
=== A ===
==== Argentina ====
Berets are worn by some units in the Argentine Armed Forces, with distinctive colors for some units or functions. The beret colours are as follows:

Argentine Army
Colour	Wearer
Dark green	Commandos
Black	Armor & mechanized infantry troops
Scarlet	Paratroops
Claret	601 Air Assault Regiment
Tan	Mountain troops
Dark blue	Army aviation
Brown	Amphibious engineers
Olive green	All other army units

Argentine Navy
Colour	Wearer
Dark green	Amphibious Commandos Group
Black	Naval Infantry Command in the windy southern regions
Brown	Navy Tactical Divers Group

Argentine Air Force, Gendarmerie & others
Colour	Wearer
Dark blue	Air Force Special Operations group
Dark green	Gendermarie
Orange	Instituto Antártico Argentino

==== Australia ====
In all service branches, the beret is "bashed" to the right and a badge or insignia is worn above the left eye. In the army, all units can wear them with certain units wearing unique ones. In the navy, the beret is an optional item and in the air force, it is only worn by certain units.

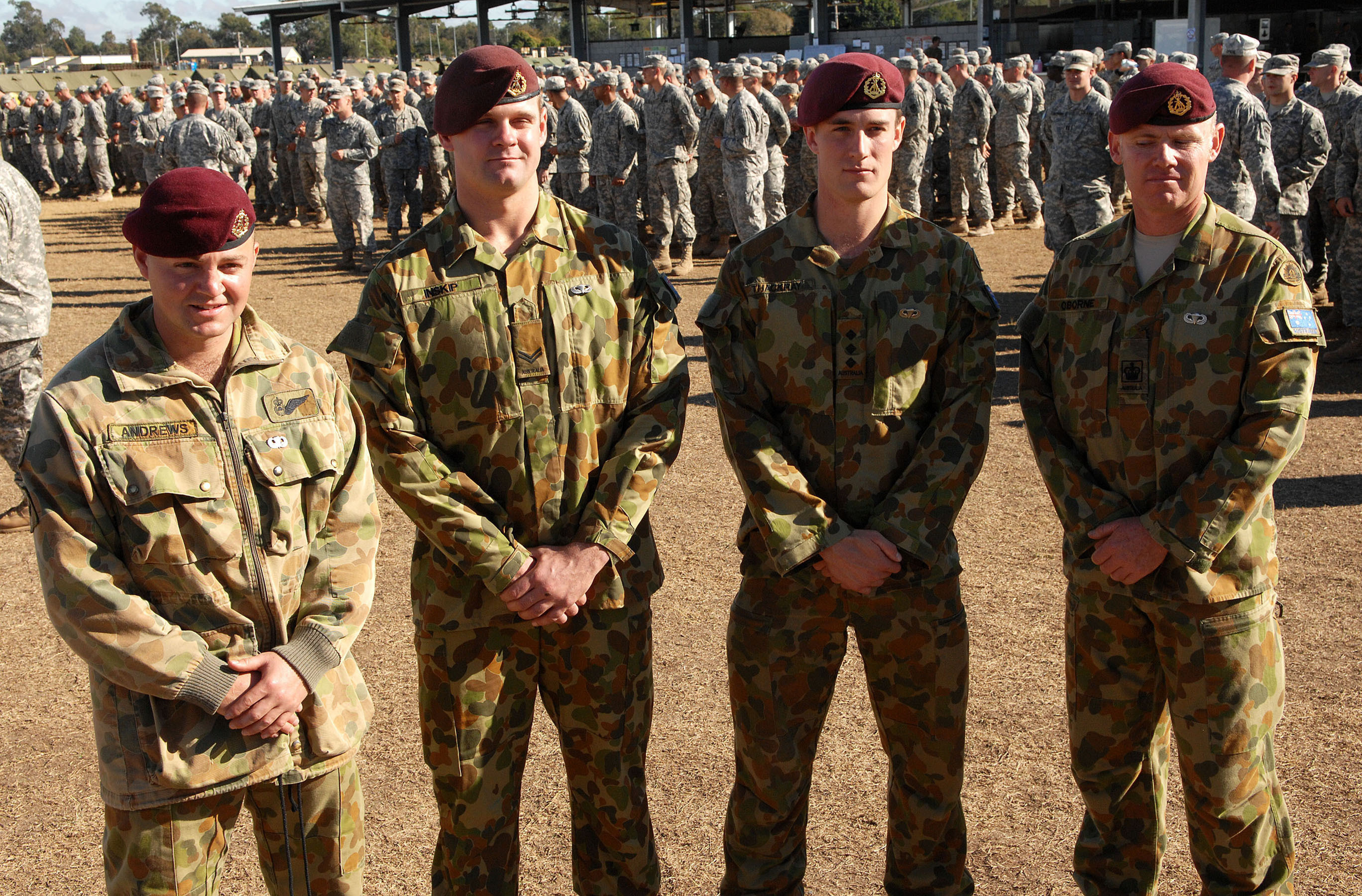
Australian and US paratroopers exchange wings during Talisman Sabre 2011

Australian Army
Colour	Wearer
Dark blue	All army members who are not eligible to wear a specific one
Black	Royal Australian Armoured Corps
Rifle green	Royal Australian Regiment
Light blue	Australian Army Aviation
Scarlet	Royal Australian Corps of Military Police
Dull cherry	Parachute qualified personnel posted to No. 176 Air Dispatch Squadron, Air Movements Training and Development Unit, Australian Defence Force Parachuting School, and other parachute riggers
Sherwood green	1st Commando Regiment and 2nd Commando Regiment
Fawn	Special Air Service Regiment
Slate grey	Royal Australian Army Nursing Corps, unless posted to an armoured or aviation unit

Royal Australian Air Force
Colour	Wearer
Dark blue	No. 1 Security Forces Squadron RAAF and No. 2 Security Forces Squadron RAAF personnel, excluding EOD technicians
Aircraft grey	B Flight, No. 4 Squadron RAAF

Royal Australian Navy
Colour	Wearer
Navy blue	Optional for all naval personnel

==== Austria ====
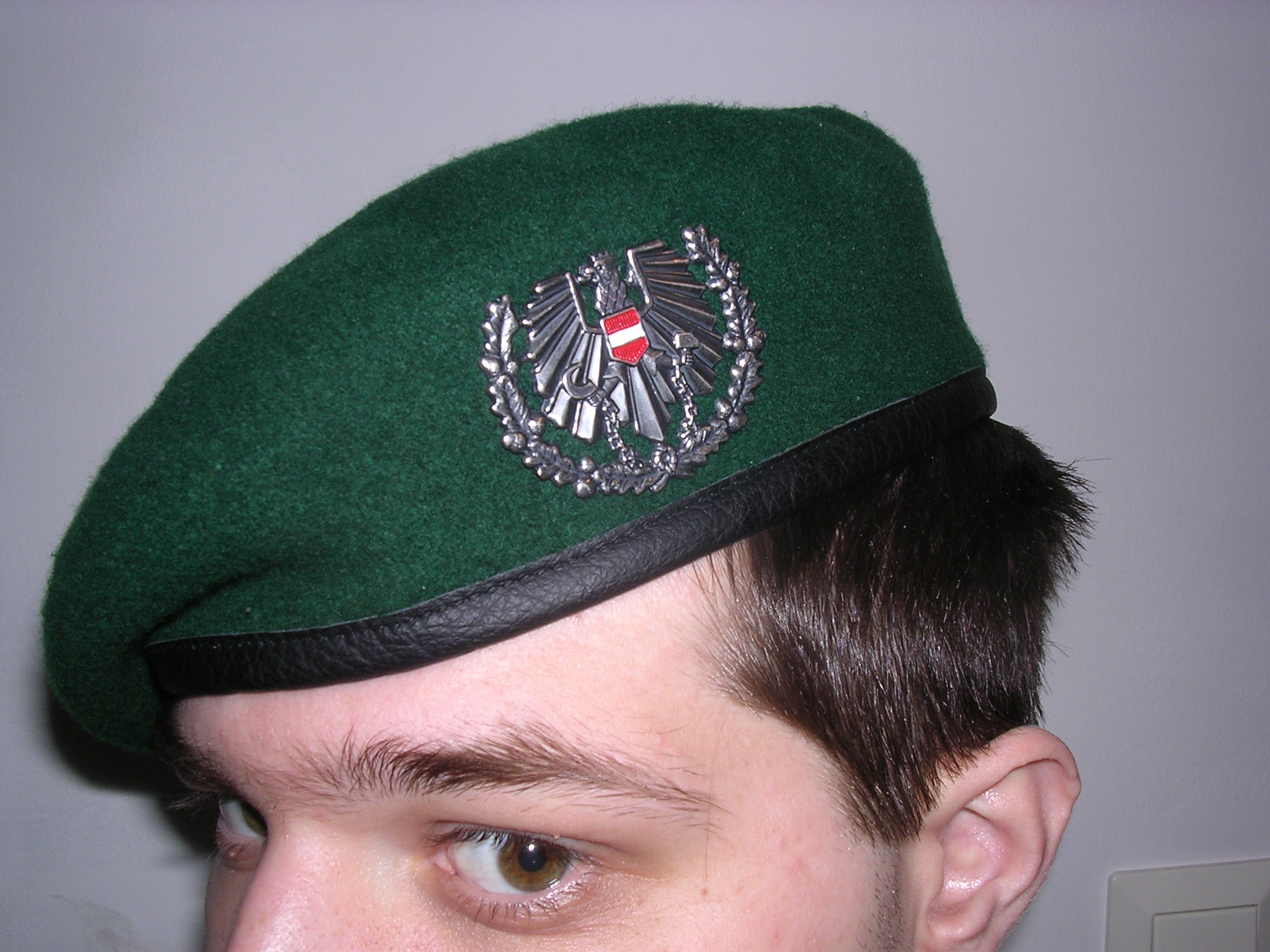
Austrian green beret with silver coat of arms

The Austrian coat of arms is worn on the left side of the beret (officers in gold, NCOs in silver, enlisted personnel as well as conscripts in dark grey). An exception are members of the special forces (Jagdkommando): after successfully completing the Basic Special Forces Course (Jagdkommandogrundkurs), they wear the Special Forces Badge (Jagdkommandoabzeichen) instead of the coat of arms on their berets.

The Austrian Army wears the following colours:

Colour	Wearer
Green	Infantry, various other units
Black	Tank and armored infantry (Panzergrenadier)
Scarlet	Guards Battalion (Gardebataillon)
Maroon	25th (Airborne) Infantry Battalion (Jägerbataillon 25)
Beige	7th (Light) Brigade (7. Jägerbrigade/Jagdkampf)
Coral	Military Police
Auburn	1st and 2nd Command Support Battalion, Command Support School
Pike grey	CBRN Defense School, Austrian Forces Disaster Relief Unit (AFDRU)
Dark blue	Logistic Command, Army Logistics School
Yellow-green	Athletes and other members of Armed Forces Sports Centers
Olive	Special forces (Jagdkommando)

=== B ===
==== Bolivia ====
Berets in Bolivian Army:

- Black – Paratroopers
- Maroon – Armoured Corps
- Green – Special Operations Forces, Commandos
- Camouflage – Special Forces "Bolivian Condors"
- Tan – Mountain Infantry (Satinadores de Montaña)
- Blue – Engineer units

Berets in Bolivian Air Force:

- Royal blue – Air Force Infantry personnel

=== C ===
==== Canada ====
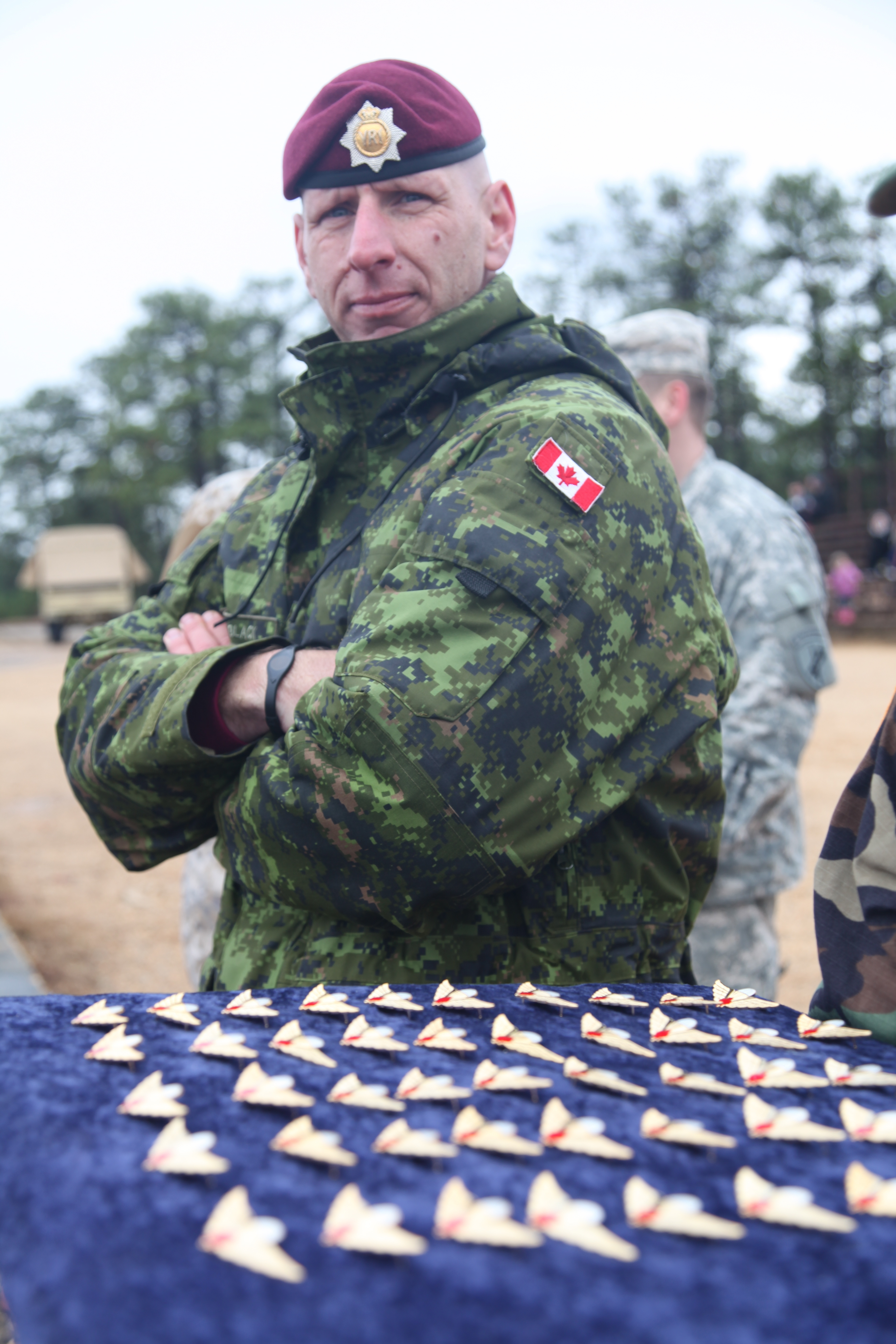
A Canadian jumpmaster of the Royal Canadian Regiment with a maroon beret

The colour of the beret is determined by the wearer's environment, branch, or mission. The beret colours listed below are the current standard:

Colour	Wearer
Air Force blue	Air Force personnel not otherwise authorized to wear other color
Black	Navy personnel not otherwise authorized to wear other color, Royal Canadian Armoured Corps
CF green	Army personnel not otherwise authorized to wear other color
Scarlet	Military police
Maroon	Paratroopers serving in active jump companies
Blaze orange	Search-and-rescue technicians
Tan	Personnel assigned to CANSOFCOM and members of SOF Branch regardless of assignment
Dark blue	Royal Canadian Dental Corps, Royal Regiment of Canadian Artillery, Royal Canadian Electrical and Mechanical Engineers, Royal Canadian Corps of Signals, Canadian Intelligence Corps
Khaki	Foot guard regiments

==== China ====
Since May 5, 2000, the People's Liberation Army has adopted woolen berets for all its personnel, along with the traditional peaked caps. Type 99 beret

- Olive green – Ground Forces and Strategic Forces
- Dark blue – Navy
- Black – Marine corps
- Blue-grey – Air Force (including Airborne troops)

Berets were not officially adopted by the CAPF, but some of the forces issued their own types NOT OFFICIAL:

- Red – CAPF Provincial Women Special Police Corps
- Dark blue – Public Security Police SWAT

During the 80s, camo berets were issued to some of the recon forces of PLA. It has no badge on it.

Type 07 uniform is being issued to both PLA and CAPF on August 1, 2007. Colours of 07 berets are changed to the same colours with the service uniform. And several changes in designs were made from type 99 beret. The berets were not being issued until summer of 2009 to most of the troops.

Other than colours of the berets, the most significant difference between type 99 and type 07 is the type 99 beret badge is cloth, while type 07 is plastic.

==== Cuba ====
In the Cuban Revolutionary Armed Forces, the following berets are in use:

Colour	Wearer
Black	Tank troops (tanquistas) wear black berets (including the "Gran Unidad Rescate de Sanguily"); also the special troops (Brigada Especial Nacional "Gallitos Negros") of the interior ministry (MININT).
Red	The military police (Tropas de Prevención) wear red berets.
Olive green	Special forces (Tropas Especiales "Avispas Negras") since 2011, wear olive green berets (formerly wearing red berets).
Olive	Militias (Milicias de Tropas Territoriales) wear olive-colored berets

==== Czech Republic ====
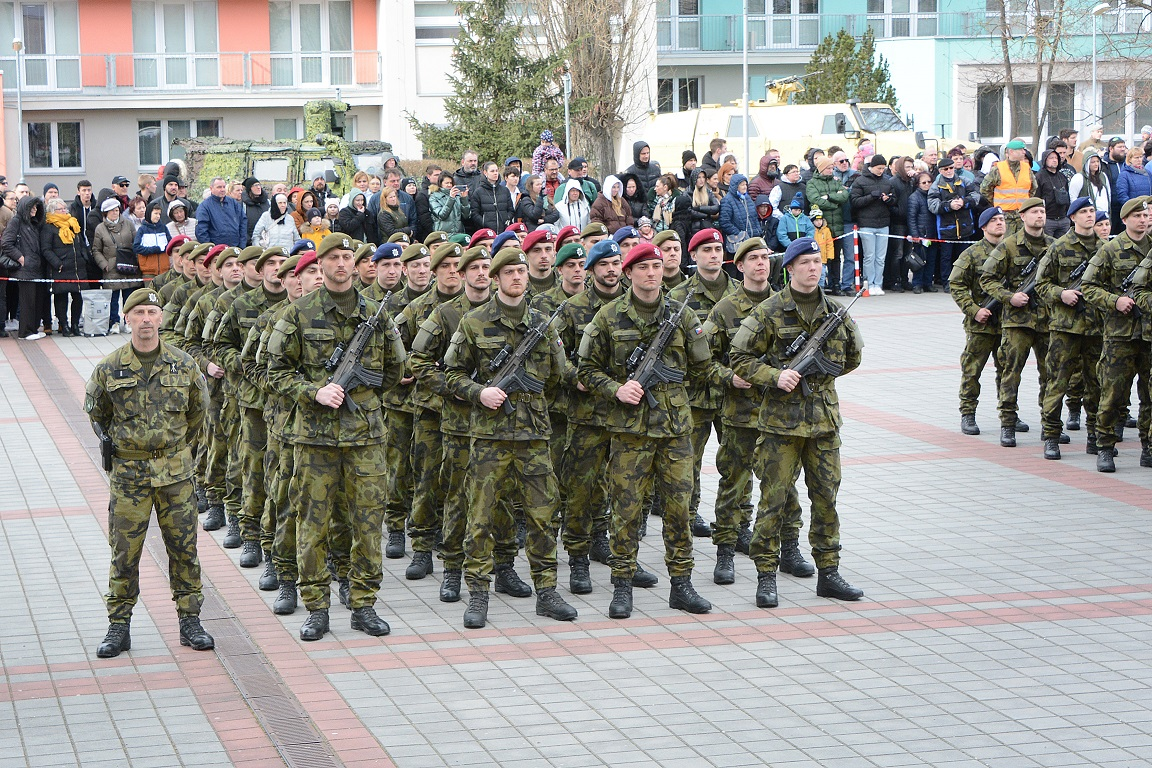
Czech soldiers with a selection of different berets during an Oath swearing ceremony, March 2023.

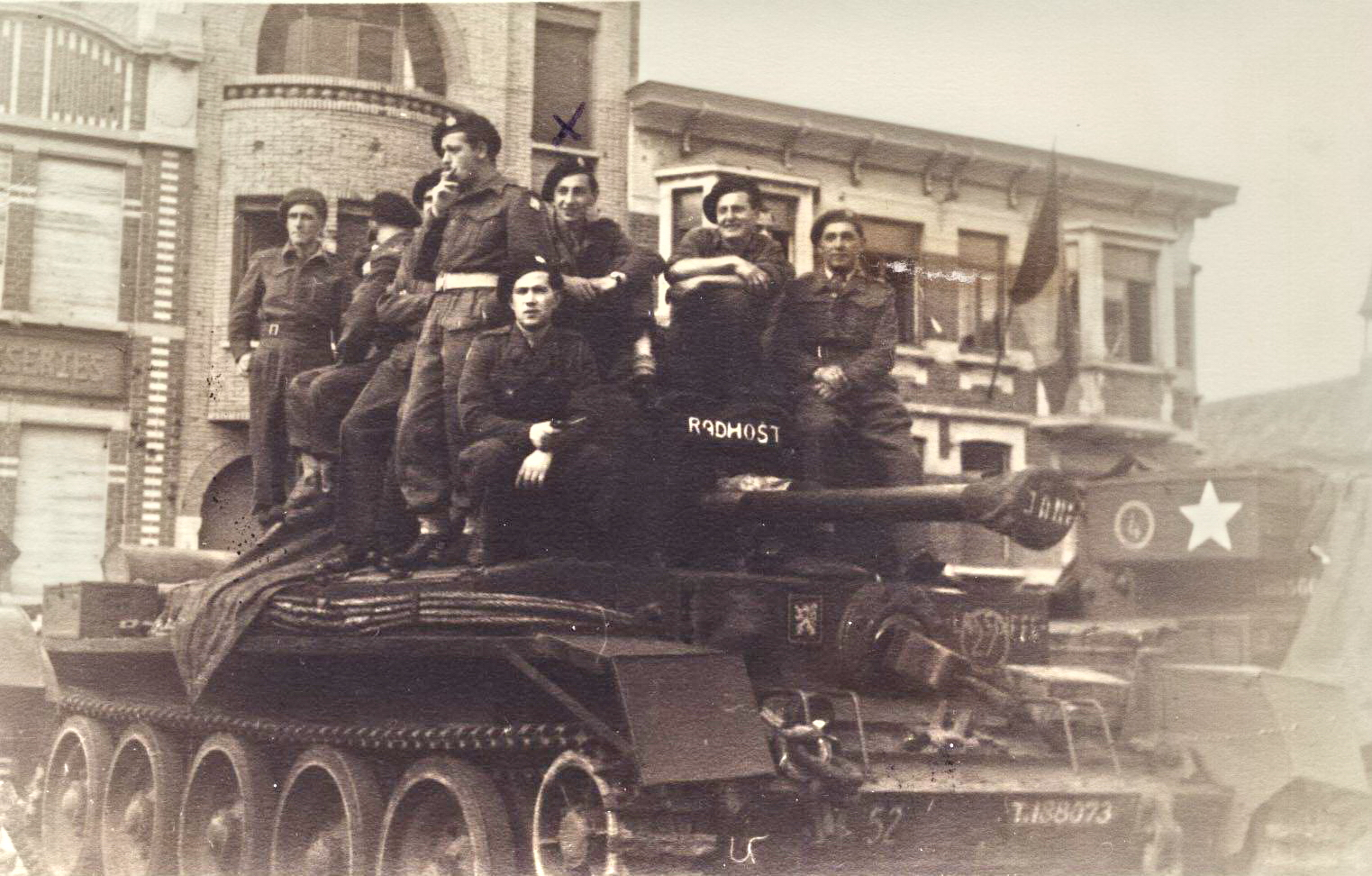
The current style of military berets as well as the new khaki variant are references to the British uniforms worn by the Czechoslovak soldiers during the World War II as part of the Czechoslovak Independent Armoured Brigade).

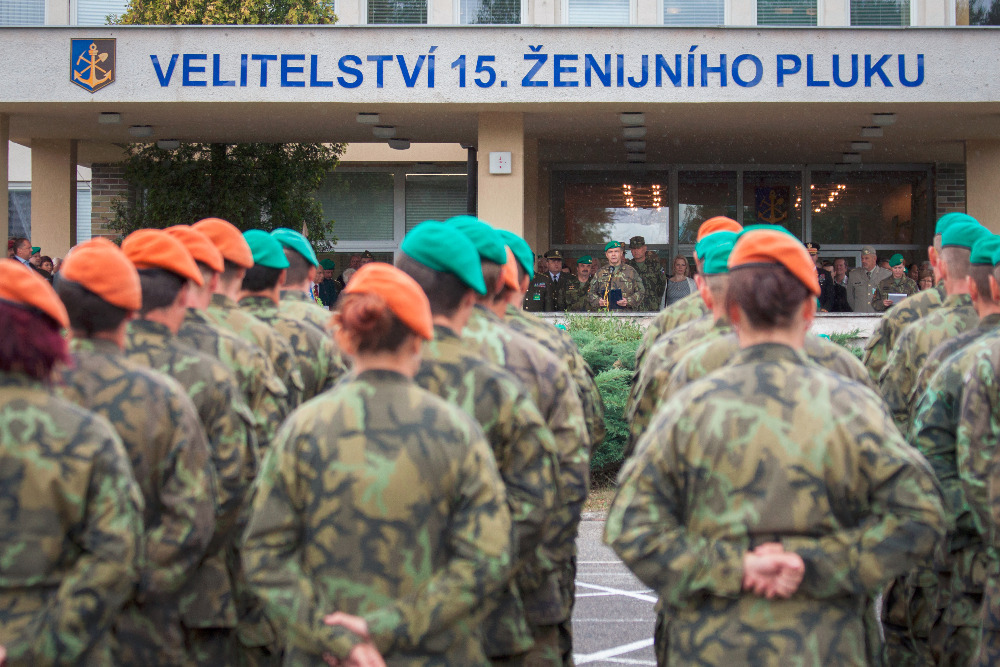
Czech soldiers wearing discontinued berets (Light green formerly for all ground forces, in 2023 replaced by khaki berets; Orange worn by Rescue and Civil defence troops, since disbanded). June 2017.

The Armed Forces of the Czech Republic use berets for both battledress and display uniform. The colour of the beret signifies the branch of the armed forces. The beret displays the Czech Army badge (silver for NCOs and enlisted, gold for officers, gold with linden branchlets for generals) and the rank of the individual.

The history of the military berets in the Czech military dates back at least to the World War I, when the Czechoslovak legionaires in France wore the standard field blue military berets as part of their uniforms. After the war and foundation of the First Czechoslovak Republic, the whole uniform continued to be used for ceremonial purposes by the Prague Castle guard. During the World War Two, the Czechoslovak soldiers serving in the 1st Czechoslovak Independent Armoured Brigade wore the standard British combat uniforms, including the black beret for armoured corps, with Czechoslovak insignia.

After the war, in 1948, the newly established Czechoslovak Airborne forces adopted the maroon beret, inspired by those worn by the British Paras. After a brief discontinuation by the Communist leadership on ideological basis it was re-established in 1960s and continues to be used until this day. After the Velvet revolution berets were selected as the new standard head cover for the newly democratic Armed Forces, with several colour variants to distinguish the type of Forces or Corps being developed.

In 2023 the Czech Armed Forces updated the colours of their berets, completely discontinuing the orange beret for the Rescue and Civil defence forces (disbanded) and adopting two new colours: blue for the Prague Castle Guard and khaki for the Ground forces (including the 4th Rapid reaction brigade, formerly wearing the maroon berets), both replacing the previous and broadly unpopular light green beret.

Colour	Wearer
Khaki	Ground forces (infantry, armour, artillery, NBC protection, engineering units, etc.) and Territorial defence forces
Dark green	Reconnaissance and Electronic Warfare troops, Cyber and Information Warfare Forces, and Military Intelligence
Red	43rd Airborne Regiment, 601st Special Forces Group, Airborne specializations
Grey	Logistic, Medical, and other Combat Service Support units
Black	Military Police
Dark blue	Air Force
Blue	Prague Castle Guard. Worn with the Prague Castle Guard badge.
Orange	Sinai peninsula with the MFO badge, issued also for the Czech soldiers deployed there.
Green	Students of the Military High School in Moravská Třebová. (Original Czech ground forces beret until 2023).

=== D ===
==== Denmark ====
The Royal Danish Army first introduced the black berets for its armour personnel in 1958. In 1968 it was extended to the whole army, Homeguard and parts of the Navy and Airforce, replacing the standard issue Side cap.

Colour	Wearer
Black	All Army combat units and artillery: JDR, GHR, LG, SLFR and DAR (2014–)
Green	All Army non-combat units: Engineers, Logistics, Intelligence, Army Home Guard
Blue	Signal troops (2019–)
Maroon	Jægerkorpset, SOKOM
Red	Military Police (all Branches)
Light blue	Royal Danish Air Force, Air Force Home Guard
Dark blue	Royal Danish Navy, Naval Home Guard
Disbanded Colors
Dark brown	Danish Women's Voluntary Corps (1951–1989)
"Signal blue"	Signal troops (2014–2019)
Light blue (or "mouse grey")	Army Air Service (1992–2004)

==== Dominican Republic ====
The Armed Forces of the Dominican Republic general issue beret is dark blue with this being standard across all services, however some units use different colours. Paratroopers wear maroon, green is worn by commandos, black by armoured corps.

Colour	Wearer
Dark blue	General issued beret for all services.
Maroon (Amaranto)	Worn by paratroopers.
Green	Worn by commandos.
Black	Worn by armoured corps.
Tan	Worn by mountain infantry.
Blue	Worn by engineer units and army aviation personnel.
Camouflage	Worn by some commando/special forces units.

=== F ===
==== France ====

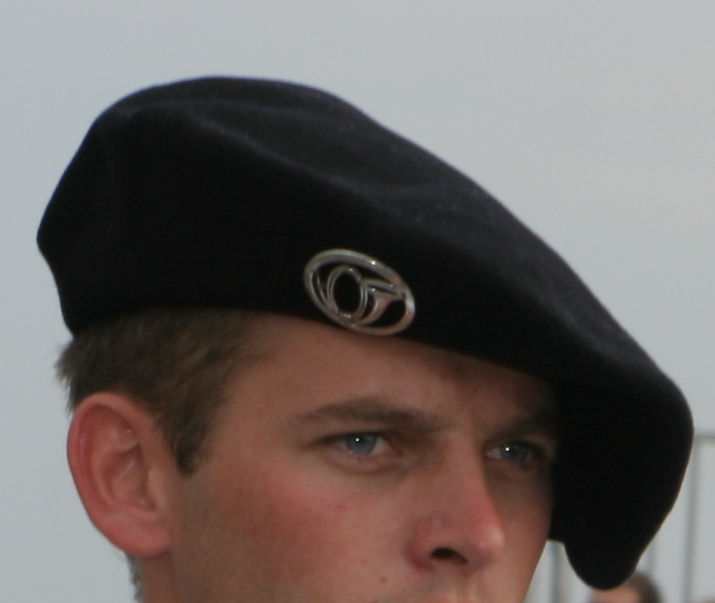
Chasseurs Alpins's distinct wide beret

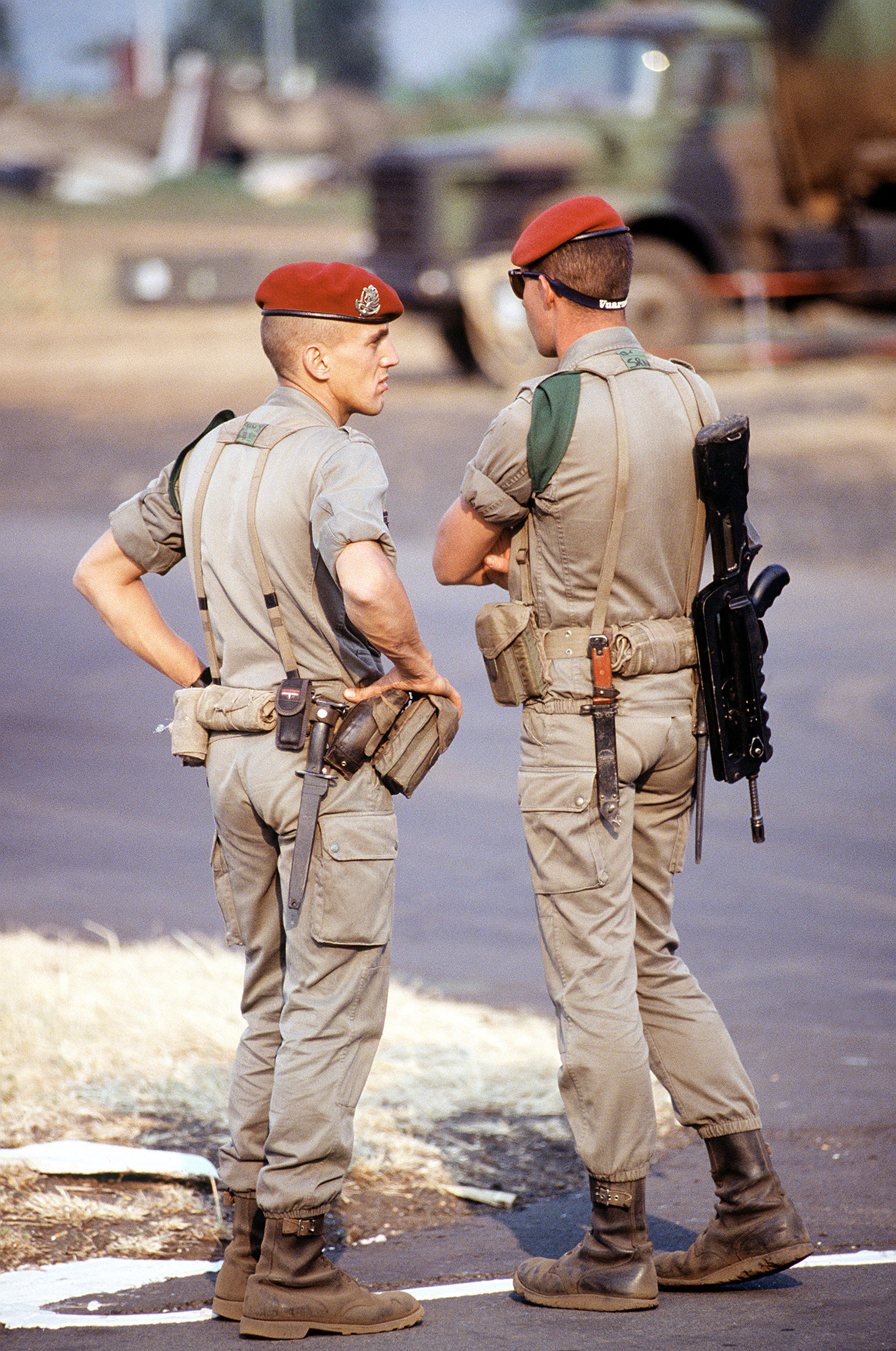
French paratroopers wearing red berets

The military beret originated in the French Army, in the form of the wide and floppy headdress worn by the Chasseurs Alpins (mountain light infantry) from their foundation in the early 1880s. The practical uses of the beret were soon recognised and the Marine Infantry forming part of the Expeditionary Force sent in China in 1900 used berets as headwear. A tight-fitting version was subsequently adopted by French armoured troops towards the end of World War I. Between the wars, special fortress units raised to garrison the Maginot Line wore khaki berets as did the 13th Demi-Brigade of Foreign Legion when it was created in 1940. The Vichy Milice of the War period wore a blue beret.

The beret in blue, red or green was a distinction respectively of the Metropolitan, Colonial and Legion paratrooper units during the Indochina and Algerian wars. In 1962 the beret in either light khaki or the colours specified above became the standard French Army headdress for ordinary use.

With the exception of the Commandos Marine and the Fusiliers Marins, whose berets are worn pulled to the right, all other French military berets (army, air force and Gendarmerie) are pulled to the left with the badge worn over the right eye or temple. Also the military forces of the countries that have historical, colonial, or cooperative ties with France – such as Algeria, Burkina Faso, Cameroon, Central African Republic, Chad, Congo, Côte d'Ivoire, Gabon, Lebanon, Mali, Mauritania, Morocco, Niger, Sénégal, Togo, Tunisia – or have been trained by the French military wear their beret pulled left.

Gendarmerie personnel serving with the European Gendarmerie Force (EUROGENDFOR) – an EU crisis response and intervention force – wear the standard EUROGENDFOR royal blue beret and badge when so assigned.

Colour	Wearer
Wide beret, dark blue	Chasseurs Alpins (the wide beret's nickname is the tarte (pie); it is also worn with a white cover (winter dress)).
Dark blue	Fusiliers Commandos de l'Air; Troupes de Marine and all other army troops; Gendarmerie; Fusiliers Marins (pulled to the right)
Green (Béret vert)	Foreign Legion
Dark green	Commandos Marine (pulled to the right)
Red (Béret rouge)	Paratroopers: except: 1^{er} Régiment de Parachutistes d'Infanterie de Marine: purple (see below); 2^{e} Régiment étranger de parachutistes: green (see Foreign Legion above)
Purple (Béret amarante)	1^{er} Régiment de Parachutistes d'Infanterie de Marine since 11 April 2017.
Azure blue	French Army Light Aviation
Black	Armoured regiments (régiments de chars de combat)
Brown	2^{e} régiment de hussards

=== G ===
==== Germany ====
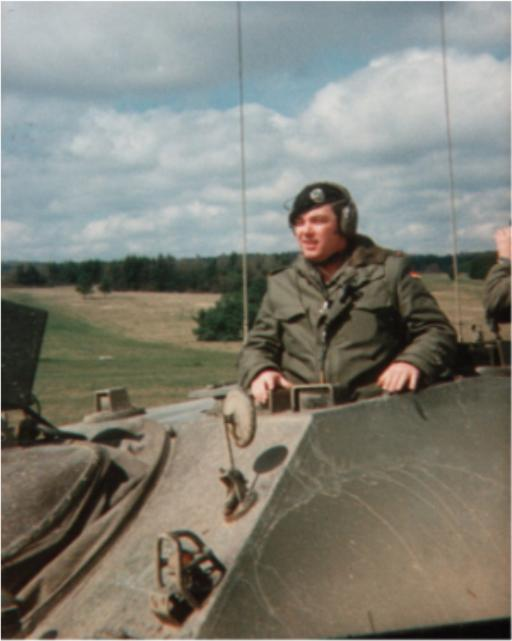
First Sergeant of the Panzerjäger with black beret, 1989

The German Heer uses berets with different badges for every branch of service. The Luftwaffe and the Marine issue dark blue berets only to their ground or land combat units (called Luftwaffensicherungstruppe and Marineschutzkräfte) respectively. Berets are usually worn at special ceremonies and roll calls, although units with a special esprit de corps, especially armoured and mechanized infantry (Panzergrenadiere) battalions, wear their berets all the time. German berets are always pulled to the right, with the badge visible over the left temple.

The following colours are worn by the German armed forces:

Colour	Wearer
Black	Armoured units, including armoured reconnaissance
Green	Infantry units, including Jägertruppe (light infantry), Panzergrenadiere (armoured infantry), army ceremonial guards (Wachbataillon des Heeres) and the now disbanded Panzerjäger (armoured anti-tank). The Panzerjäger started off with black berets but were moved into the Panzergrenadier branch. The last Panzerjägers wore green berets.
Navy blue	Luftwaffe (Air Force) and Marine (Navy) infantry and combat divers, ceremonial guards; Offizieranwärterbataillon (officer candidate battalions of the army, dissolved since 2020), multinational units (e.g. Eurocorps) CYBER Technology Units (CIR)
Cobalt blue	Medical units
Maroon	Airborne units (or units with substantial airborne components), including paratroopers, army aviation, Airmobile Operations Division (Division Luftbewegliche Operationen; DLO), and Division Special Forces (Division Schnelle Kräfte; DSK), including the Kommando Spezialkräfte (KSK)
Coral red	Support units, including artillery, engineers, intelligence, psychological operations (Operative Information), anti-aircraft, supply, NBC protection, signals, electronic warfare, transport, topography, and military police (Feldjäger), Instandsetzung Vehicle Maintenance
Stone grey	German homeland defense units (Heimatschutz), who started out wearing the green berets of standard infantry units since the 1960s, but were granted a beret color of their own in 2025

Military bands wear the beret colour of their respective division (e.g. black in the 1st Panzer Division).

=== I ===
==== Indonesia ====
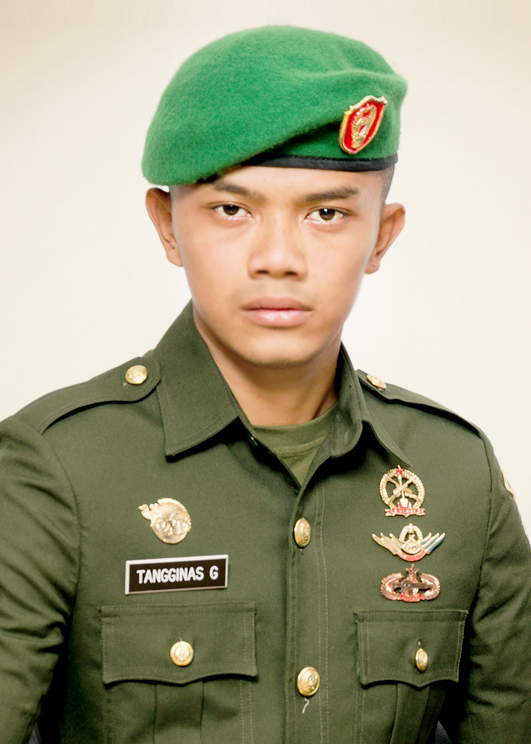
An Indonesian Army soldier wearing a green beret with the Army insignia

The beret is the standard headgear of armed forces and police personnel in Indonesia. It is also worn by paramilitary and other uniformed services in the country such as the Fire Brigade, Search and Rescue, Scouts, civil militias (such as Banser) and civil paramilitary organizations. In the Military Services (Army, Navy and Air Force), the berets are dragged to the right (the insignia are worn on the left side), while in the Indonesian National Police force and Military Police Corps, the berets are dragged to the left (the insignia are worn on the right side). Both having its own meaning, dragged to the right meaning "ready for combat and defense" and dragged to the left meaning "ready for law enforcement and order". Military and Police services according to their beret colours which represent different units within the force are as shown below:

- Indonesian Army (TNI AD)
  - Green – Army HQ, Territorial Army, regular Infantry, and Army staff
  - Red – Army Special Forces Command ("Kopassus"), including Para-Commandos
  - Dark Green – Raider Infantry air-mobile units, Mechanized Infantry
  - Green – Strategic Reserve Command Corps ("Kostrad") which itself includes infantry brigades, Airborne/Para brigades, reconnaissance platoons, cavalry and artillery battalions.
  - Black – Cavalry and Armored Cavalry (tank) Corps
  - Brown – Field Artillery Corps and Air Defense Artillery Corps
  - Green – Corps of Engineers (previously steel grey)
  - Red maroon – Army Aviation Corps (previously maroon/brick red later switched to green for 11 years and switched back to red maroon)
  - Green – Signal Corps (previously khaki)
  - Green – Logistics and Transportation Corps (previously dark blue)
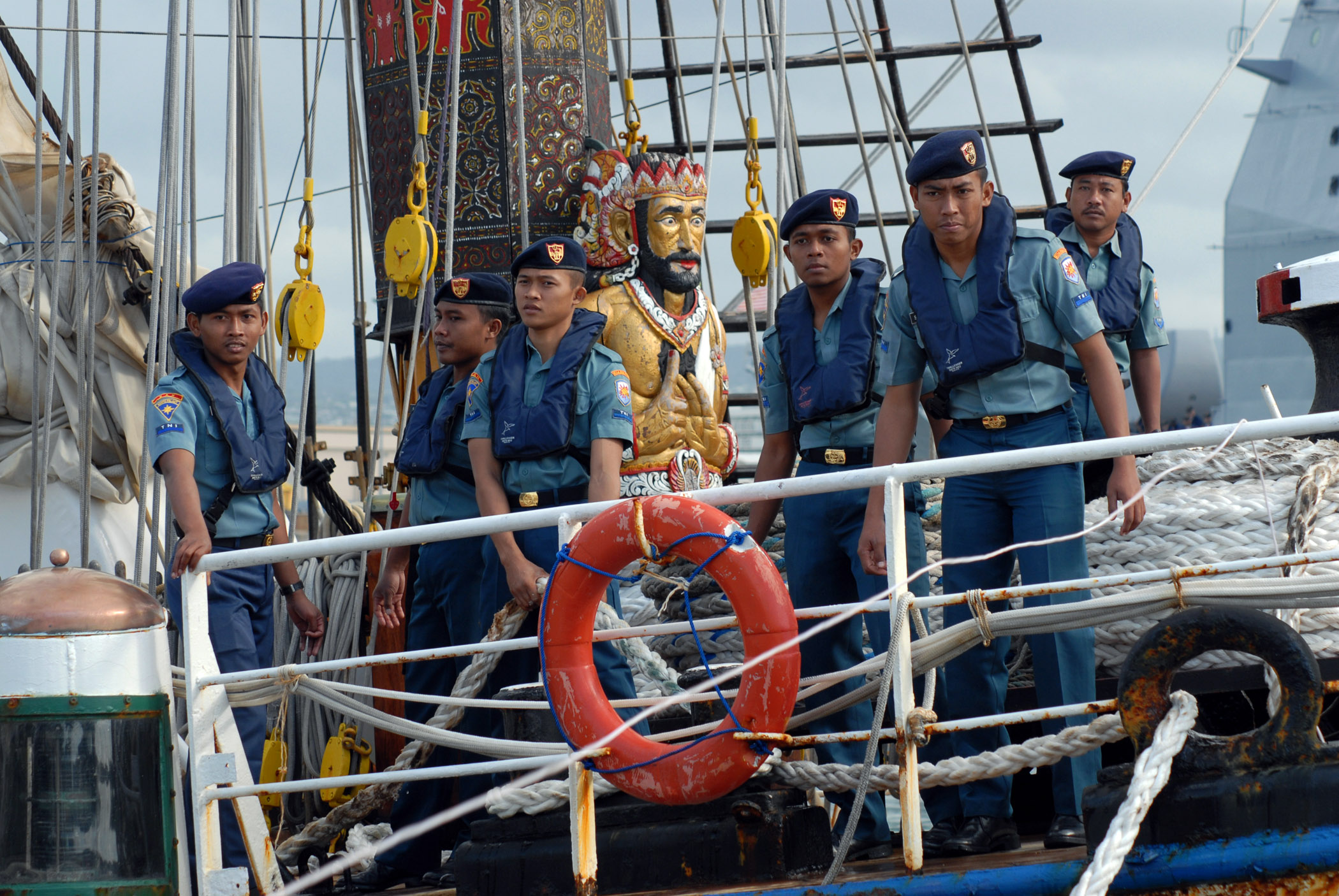
- Sailors of the Indonesian naval training ship KRI Dewaruci at the Naval Station Pearl Harbor
  Indonesian Navy (TNI AL)
  - Navy blue – Standard berets for the Navy, worn by all personnel such as Naval seamen and naval sailors in duty of ships' company, or on the Naval bases.
  - Black – Submarine forces
  - Dark Blue – Naval Aviation, Underwater Rescue Service, Naval Hydro-Oceanography Center
  - Reddish purple (magenta) – Marine Corps and Joint naval special forces (Jala Mengkara Detachment)
  - Maroon – Frogman Command
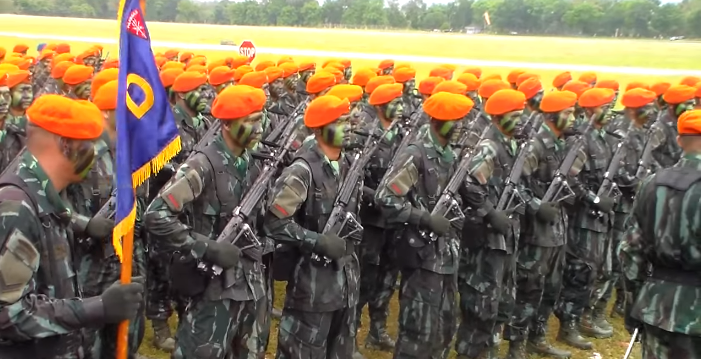
- Kopasgat commandos in formation wearing their distinctive orange beret
  Indonesian Air Force (TNI AU)
  - Dark blue – Standard berets for the Air Force, with Air Force insignia worn by Airmen and Air Force staff
  - Orange – Air Force Infantry Quick Reaction Forces Command (Kopasgat)
- Inter-services
  - Black – All personnel in Armed Forces/TNI HQ
  - Light blue (beret dragged to the left) – Military Police personnel from all branches (Army, Navy, Air Force)
  - Light blue – All personnel attached in United Nations' Peace Keeping Force (Garuda Contingent), and the Presidential Security Force (Paspampres)
  - Red – Special Operations Command
  - Dark brown – Cadets and midshipmen of the Indonesian Military, Naval, and Air Force Academies
  - Light brown – Armed Forces Reserve Component (since 2022)

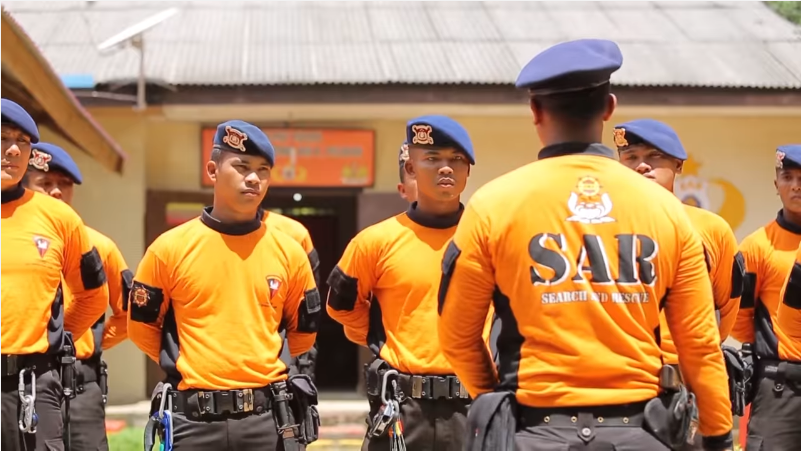
Personnel of the Search and Rescue unit, Mobile Brigade Corps of the Indonesian National Police wearing their dark blue beret

- Indonesian National Police (paramilitary, not part of the armed forces / TNI), all Police berets are dragged to the left unless noted
  - Dark blue – Mobile Brigade Corps (Brimob)
  - Dark brown – Patrol Units (Sabhara), Canine Units, Music, Security Services
  - Ultramarine – Water and Aerial Units
  - Light blue – Internal Affairs and Provost, U.N. Police with U.N. beret which dragged to the right
  - Maroon – Cadets of the Indonesian Police Academy
- Non-military
  - Dark brown – Scouts
  - Light brown – Ministry of Defence employees and Armed Forces Civil Servants (PNS), beret dragged to the left
  - Purple – College Students Regiment

==== Ireland ====
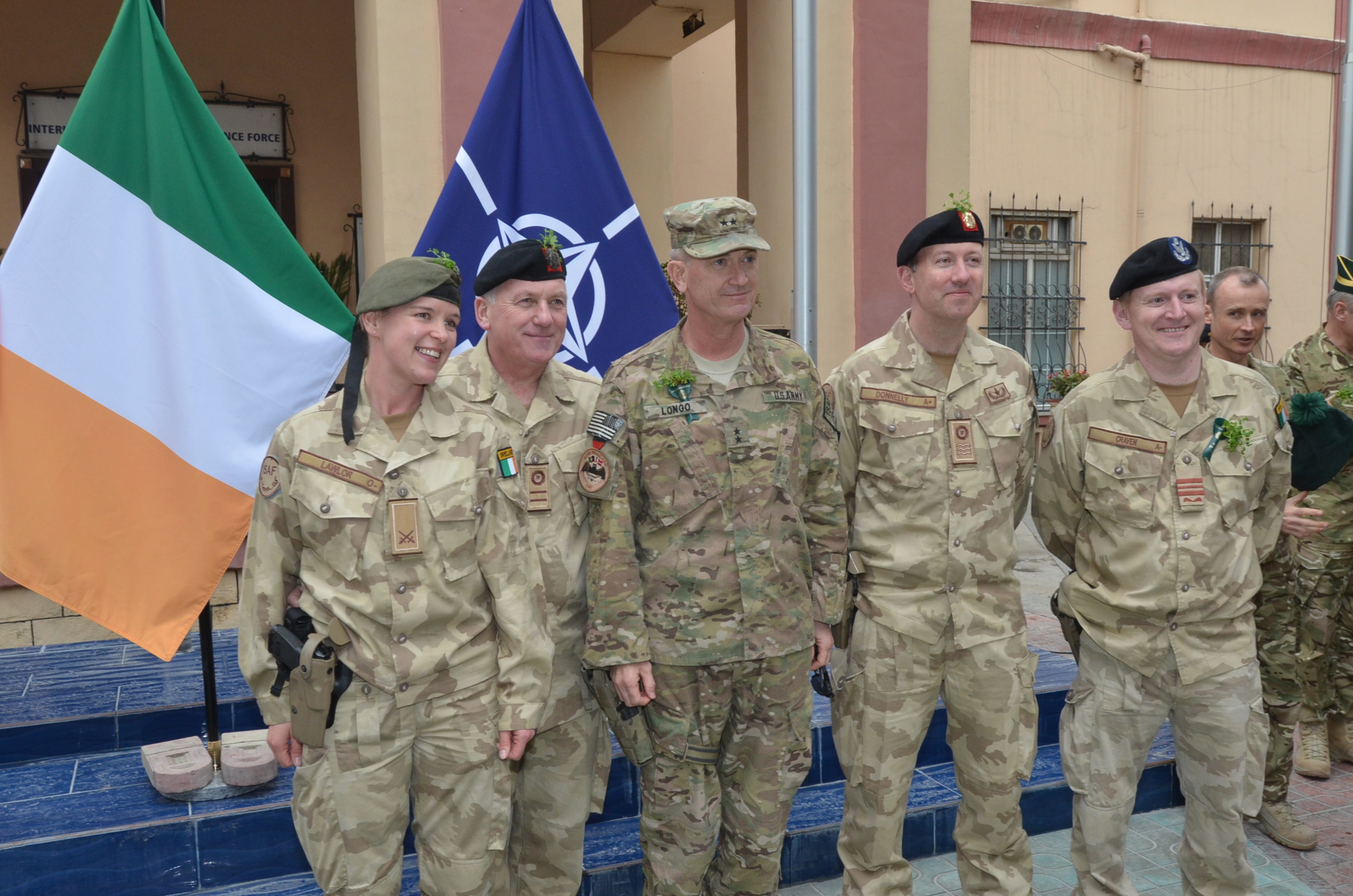
Irish Army berets in different colours

Examples of the UN blue beret and Naval Service beret worn by Irish Defence Forces officers

All Army personnel wear a common capbadge, a sunburst insignia with the letters "FF" inscribed above the left eye of the beret. The Irish Defence Forces cap badge for Officers in the Army has a more subdued appearance. Air Corps and Naval Service personnel wear their own cap badge on berets. The beret colours worn by the Irish Defence Forces are as follows:

Colour	Wearer
Black	Army, Air Corps and Naval Service - Army personnel wear red patch behind cap badge
Red	Military Police
Dark green	Army Ranger Wing (special forces)

The Cavalry Corps of the Irish Army do not wear berets; instead, they wear a Glengarry hat with black ribbons. The beret colours worn by the Reserve Defence Forces are as follows:

Colour	Wearer
Black	Army Reserve - worn with red patch behind cap badge
Red	Reserve Military Police - worn with dark green patch behind cap badge
Black	Naval Service Reserve

=== J ===
==== Japan ====
All members in the Ground Self-Defense Force are authorized to wear wool berets – referred to as the "ベレー帽" (ベレーボウ or bereebou) – as an optional head covering for dress, working, and camouflage uniforms since 1992. However, it is normally considered a special dress item, worn for public relations events or parades. An embroidered goldwork JGSDF cap badge identical to the one used on the service dress peaked cap is affixed to the beret. Berets were previously rifle green, but with the introduction of the Type 18 service uniform, the color has been changed to black. Buglers and bandsmen from the 1st Division wear red berets with an embroidered JGSDF cap badge. 1st Airborne Brigade paratroopers wear maroon berets with an enamel version of the brigade insignia instead of an embroidered JGSDF badge.

Students on the JGSDF High Technical School drill team wear black berets with a metal version of the school's emblem.

JGSDF personnel on United Nations missions wear UN blue berets with the United Nations emblem pinned to the front.

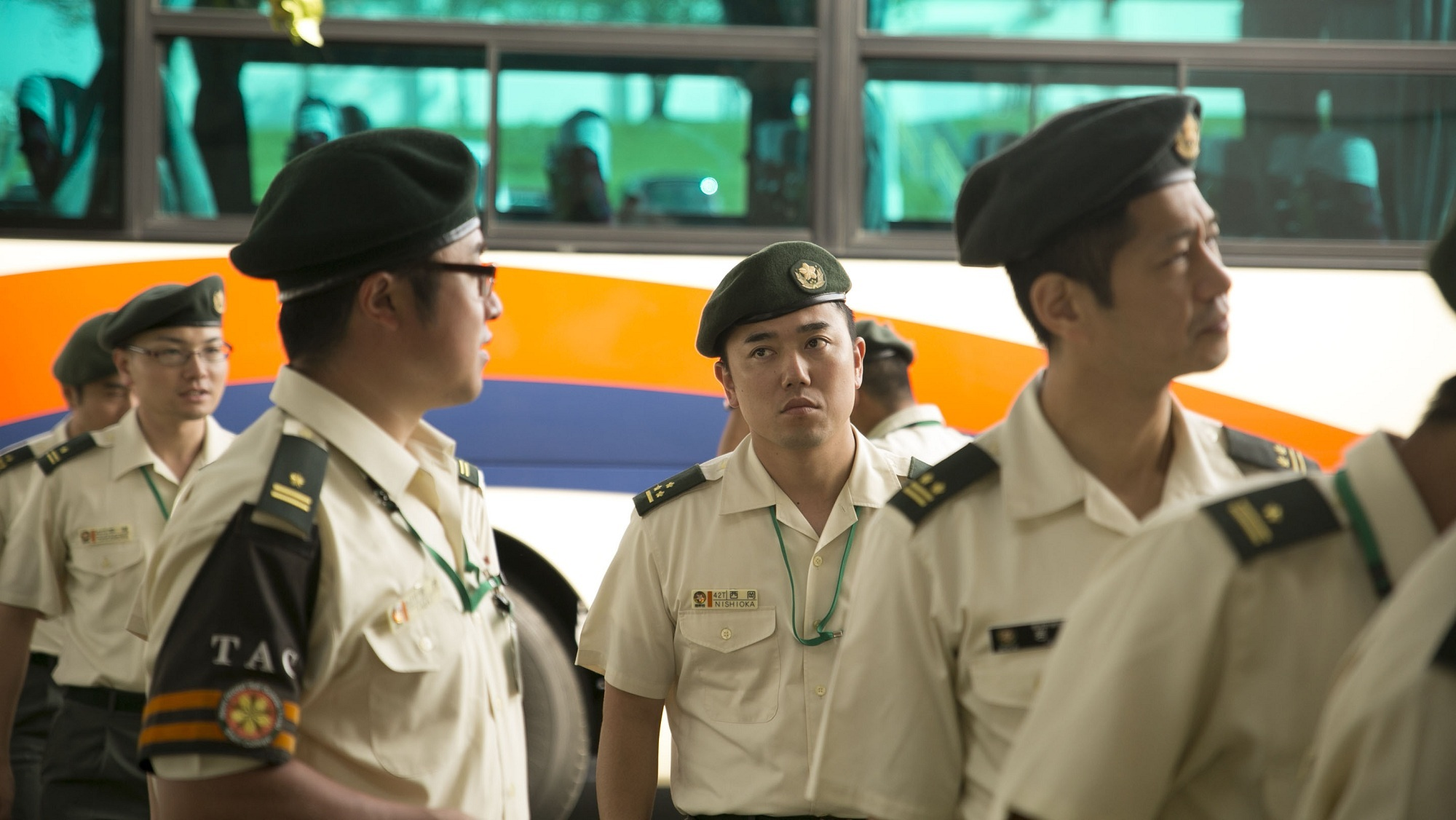
JGSDF officers at Camp Courtney, Okinawa in 2014 with previously green berets

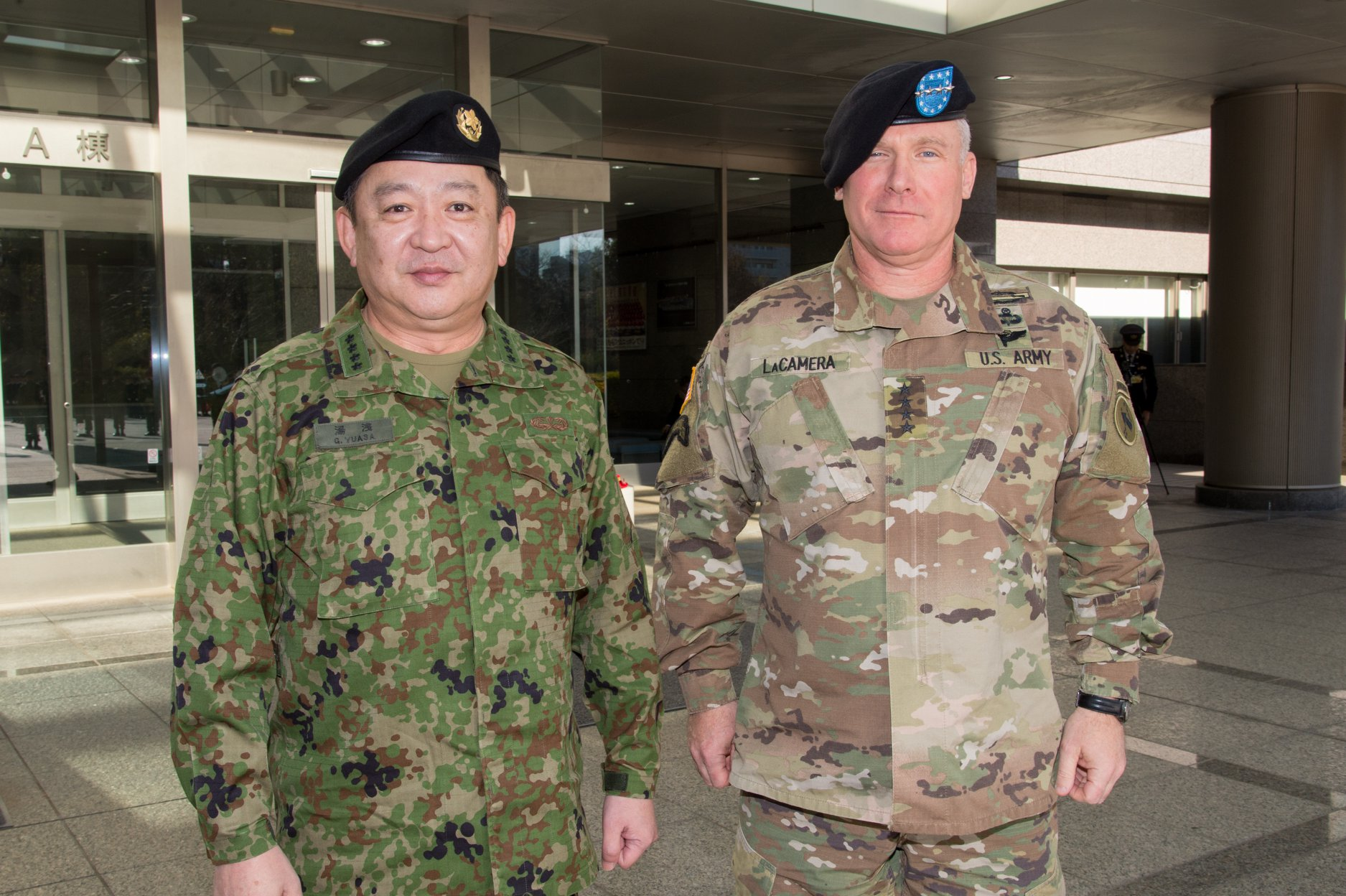
A general of the JGSDF (left) with a US Army general (right), 2019, with black beret

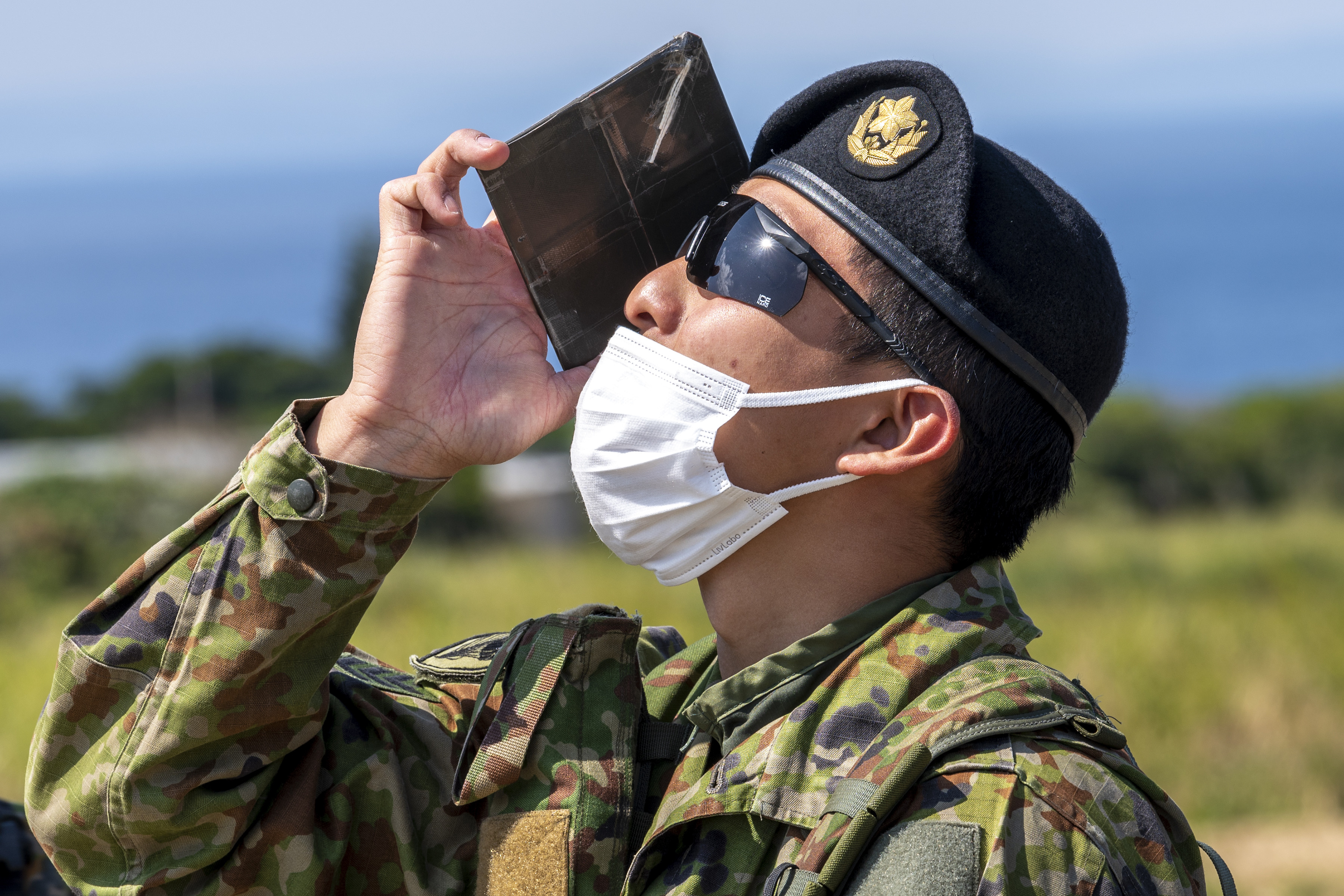
A JGSDF pathfinder of the 1st Airborne Brigade during an exercise, 2023, with black beret

=== N ===
==== New Zealand ====
New Zealand Army –

Pre 2002 beret colours –

- Khaki – Royal Regiment of New Zealand Artillery
- Green – Royal New Zealand Infantry Regiment
- Jet black – Royal New Zealand Armoured Corps
- Royal blue – Royal New Zealand Military Police
- Red – Regular Force Cadet School
- Rifle green – Royal New Zealand Corps of Signals
- Grey – Royal New Zealand Nursing Corps
- Cypress green – New Zealand Intelligence Corps
- Sand or 'ecru' – New Zealand Special Air Service
- Dark blue – All other corps

Post 2002 beret colours –

- Sand or 'ecru' – New Zealand Special Air Service
- Dark blue – Royal New Zealand Military Police
- Rifle green – All other corps

Royal New Zealand Air Force –

The RNZAF does not currently wear berets except for:

- Dark blue – Military police

=== P ===
==== Paraguay ====
The Paraguayan Armed Forces wear berets in the following colours:

Berets in Paraguayan Army:

- Green – Paratroopers
- Dark blue – Presidential Guard

Berets in Paraguayan Navy:

- Camouflage – Special Naval Forces

Berets in Paraguayan Air Force:

- Red – Air Force Infantry and Airborne personnel

==== Poland ====
Black berets were introduced before World War II for tank and armoured car crews. During World War II, berets were widely adopted in the Polish Army on the Western Front, armored troops – black, airborne – grey, commando – green. After the war in the communist era, berets were worn only by armoured units (black), navy for field and work uniform (black), paratroopers (maroon), and marines (light blue). After 1990, the beret became the standard headgear in the Armed Forces of Republic of Poland. Around the year 2000 the design of the Polish Army Beret changed, the beret sewn together from three pieces of material with four air holes, two at each side was changed to a smaller beret molded from one piece of material with no air holes. The following colours are in use:

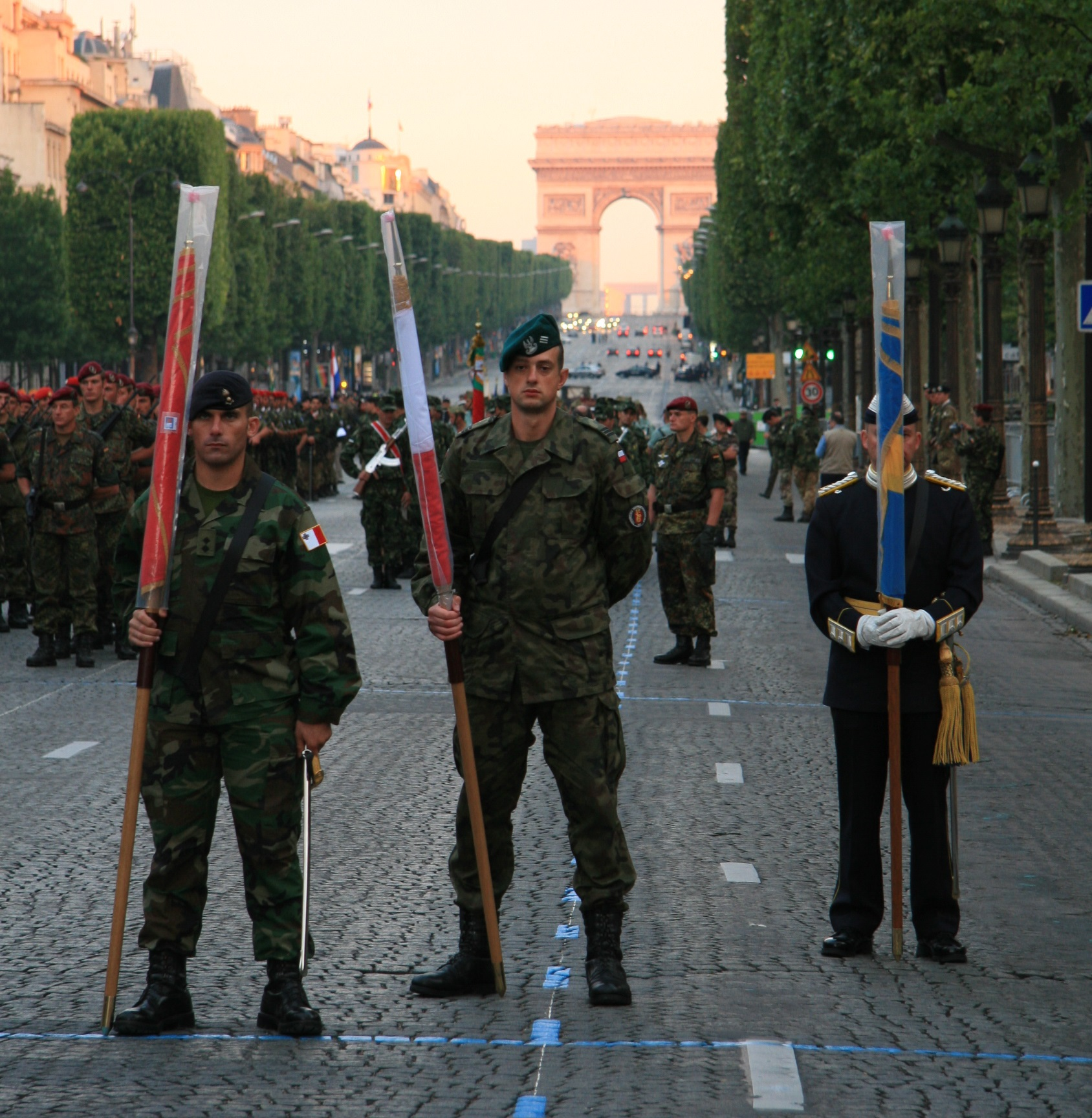
Soldier of the Maltese Armed Forces and the Polish Honor Guard

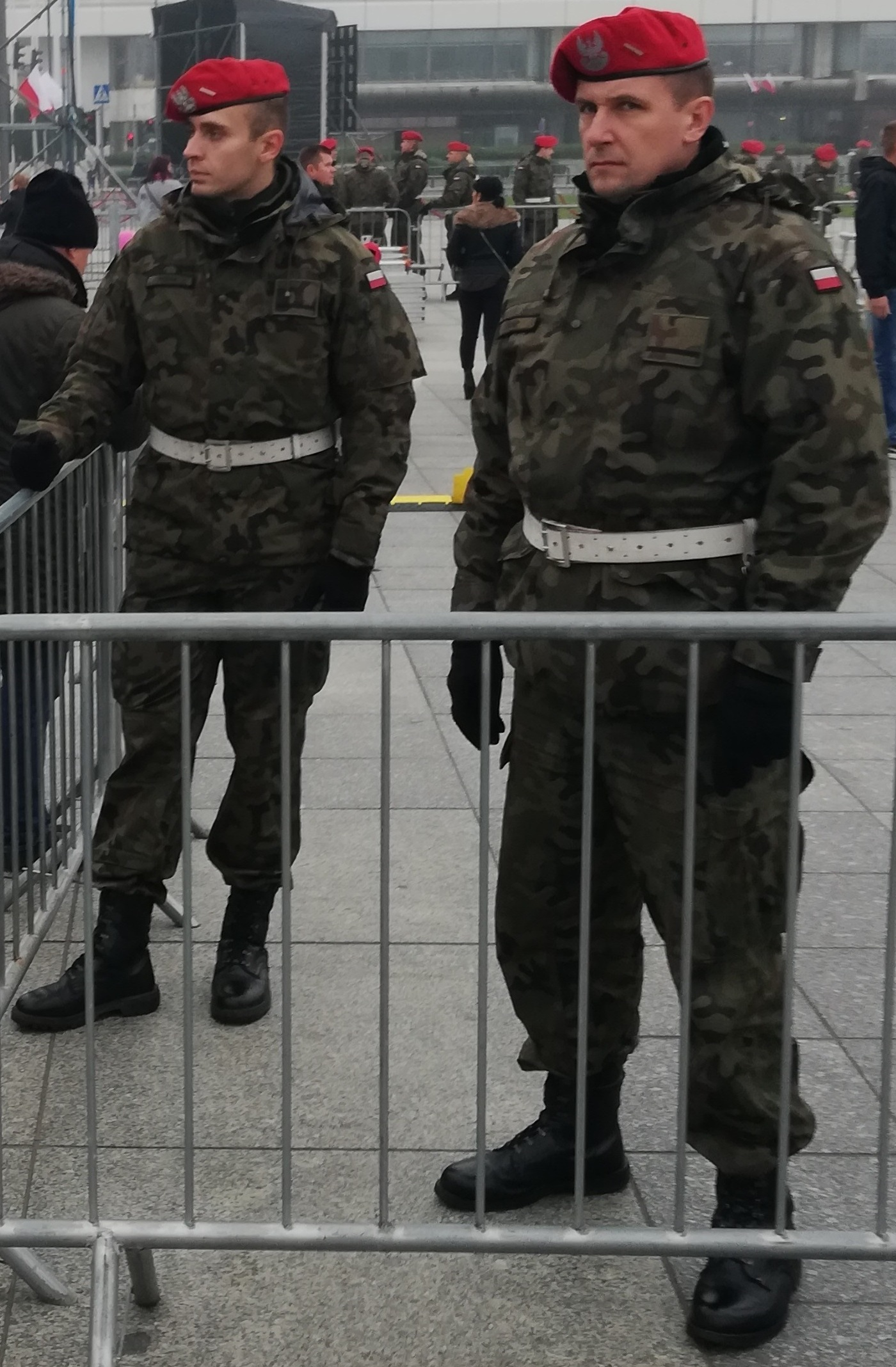
Polish Military Police officers wearing scarlet red berets

Colour	Wearer
Black	Armoured troops, Navy, Military Unit Formoza (for field and work uniform)
Blue	7th Coastal Defence Brigade, Peacekeeping Missions Training Center.
Dark Blue	Cyber Warfare Troops.
Brown	Territorial Defence (discontinued).
Olive green	Territorial Defence (present).
Green	Army general use.
Dark green	Special Forces Command.
Light grey	Military Unit GROM (JW GROM).
Steel grey	Air Force (no longer in use, replaced by camouflage side cap).
Maroon	Paratroopers.
Scarlet red	Military Police.

Berets in other ministries:

Colour	Wearer
Black	Border Guards Naval Units (phased out in 2016), Firefighters (phased out in 2021).
Light green	Border Guards (no longer in use, replaced by camouflage cap).
Steel grey	Border Guards Air Units (phased out in 2016).
Sapphire	Government Protection Bureau and the Vistula Corps of the Ministry of Internal Affairs (both disbanded).
Navy blue	Police anti-terrorist units (SPKP), State Protection Service (since 2018).

The black beret is also the distinctive headgear of World War II veterans, particularly Armia Krajowa veterans.

The dress code of the Polish armed forces states that when not worn on the head or kept in a locker the beret should be placed under the left shoulder strap. This practice was discontinued due to introducing new field uniform (wz. 2010) with rank insignia placed on chest.

==== Portugal ====
The beret was first introduced in the Portuguese Armed Forces in 1956, when the Air Force Paratroopers adopted the green beret. The Portuguese Army adopted the brown beret for its Caçadores Especiais special forces in 1960, generalizing its wear to all units in 1962. The following colors of berets were or are still worn by the Portuguese Military and Paramilitary forces:

Colour	Wearer
Army
Black	Army general use
Moss/dry green	Special Operations Troops (Rangers)
Red	Commandos (worn unofficially by some units since 1966 and officially since 1974)
Green	Paratroopers
Navy
Blue	Navy general use
Dark blue (Ferrete)	Marine Corps
Air Force
Light blue	Air Force Police
GNR – National Republican Guard (Portuguese Gendarmerie)
Dark green	GNR general use
Beige	GIPS (GNR rescue unit) until 2013 (still worn unofficially since then)
Decommissioned
Brown	Caçadores Especiais in 1960–1962, Army general use 1962–2019
Yellow	Special Groups of Mozambique until 1975
Maroon	Paratrooper Special Groups until 1975
Camouflage	Guinea 3rd and 5th Commando and native caçadores companies (unofficial) in 1966–1968, Flechas until 1975
White	Volunteer Aerial Formations until 1975
Black	Provincial organization of volunteers and civil defence until 1975

Army black beret

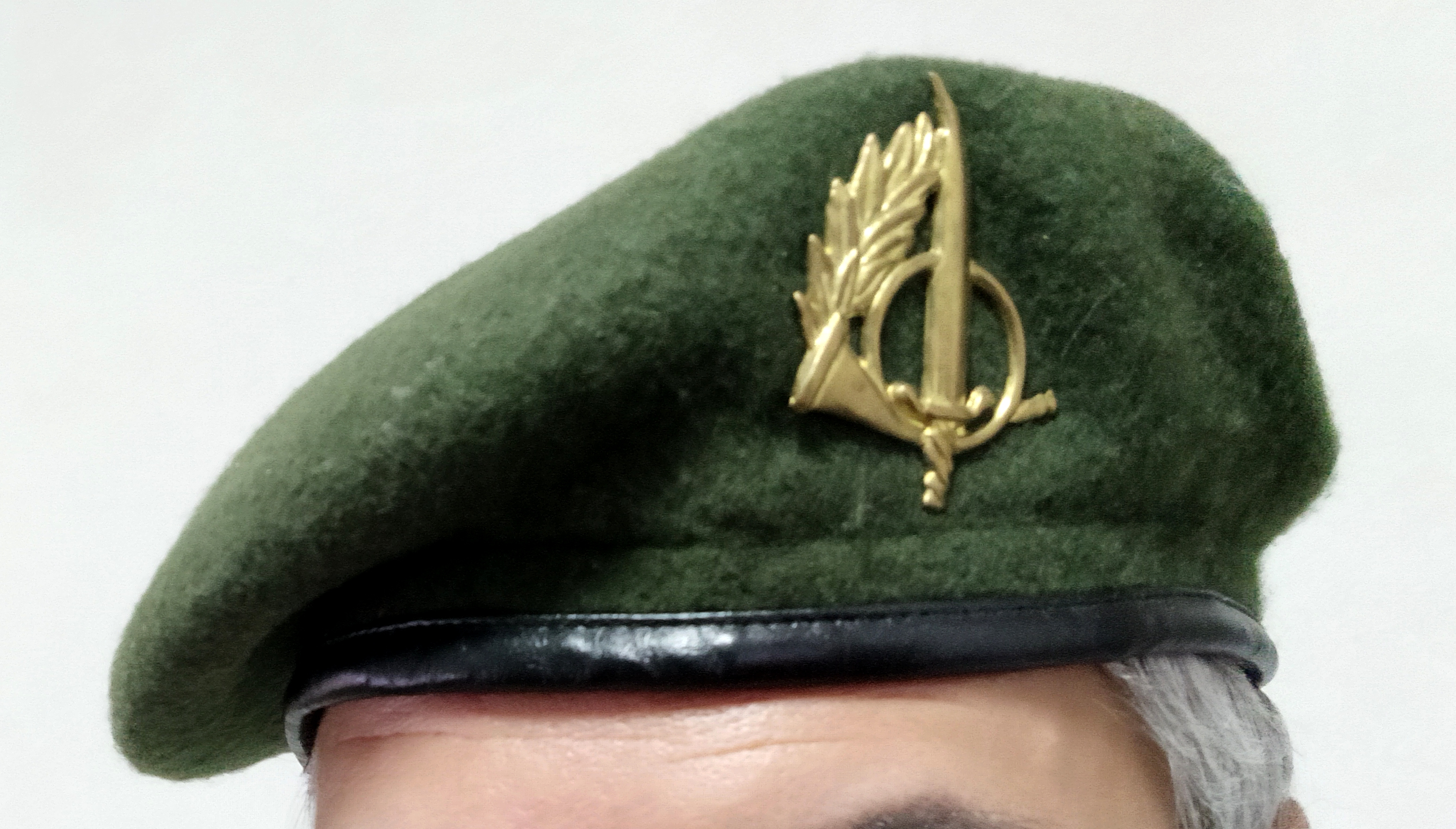
Army Special Operations Troops (Rangers) moss/dry green beret

Army Paratroopers green beret

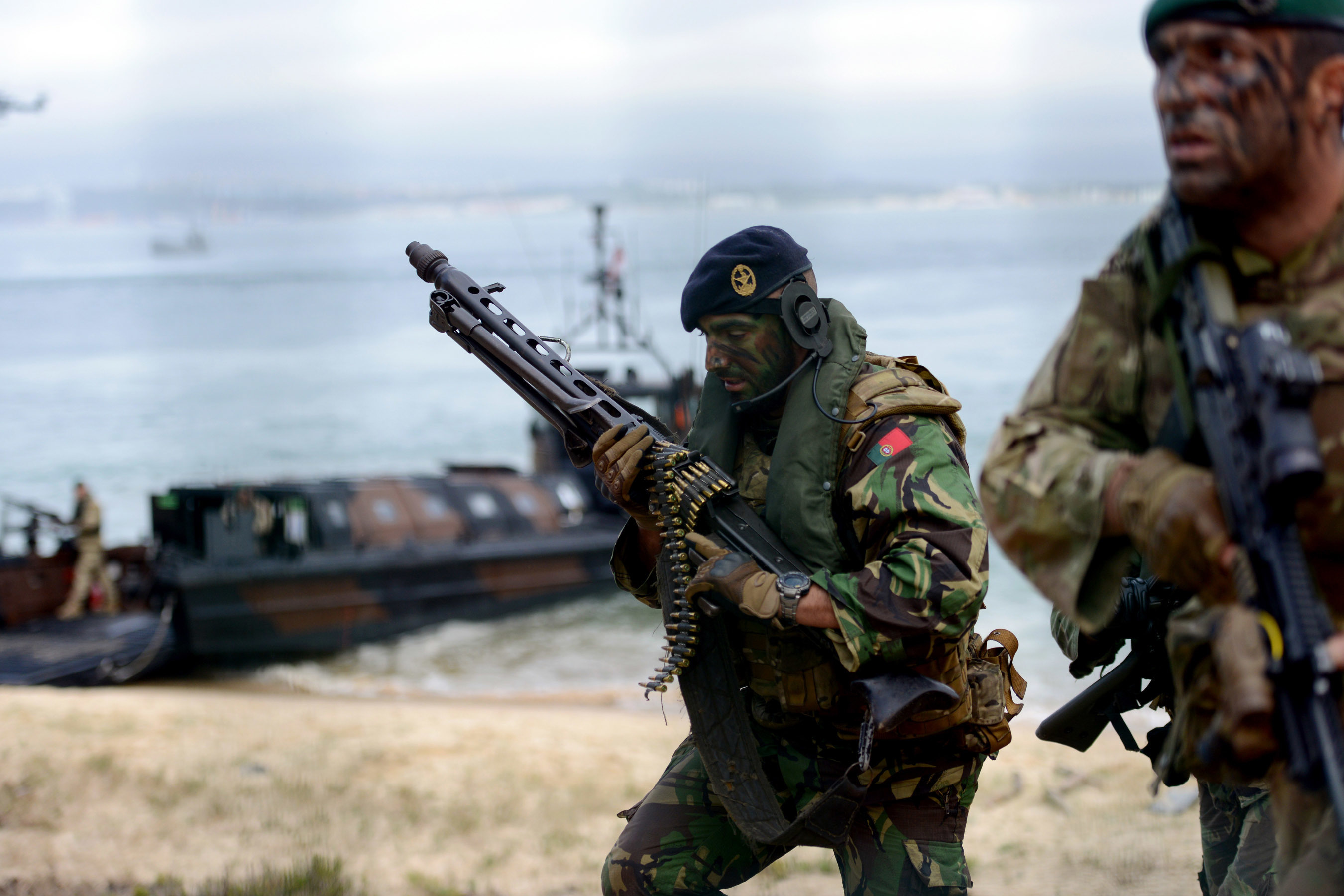
Navy Marines dark blue beret

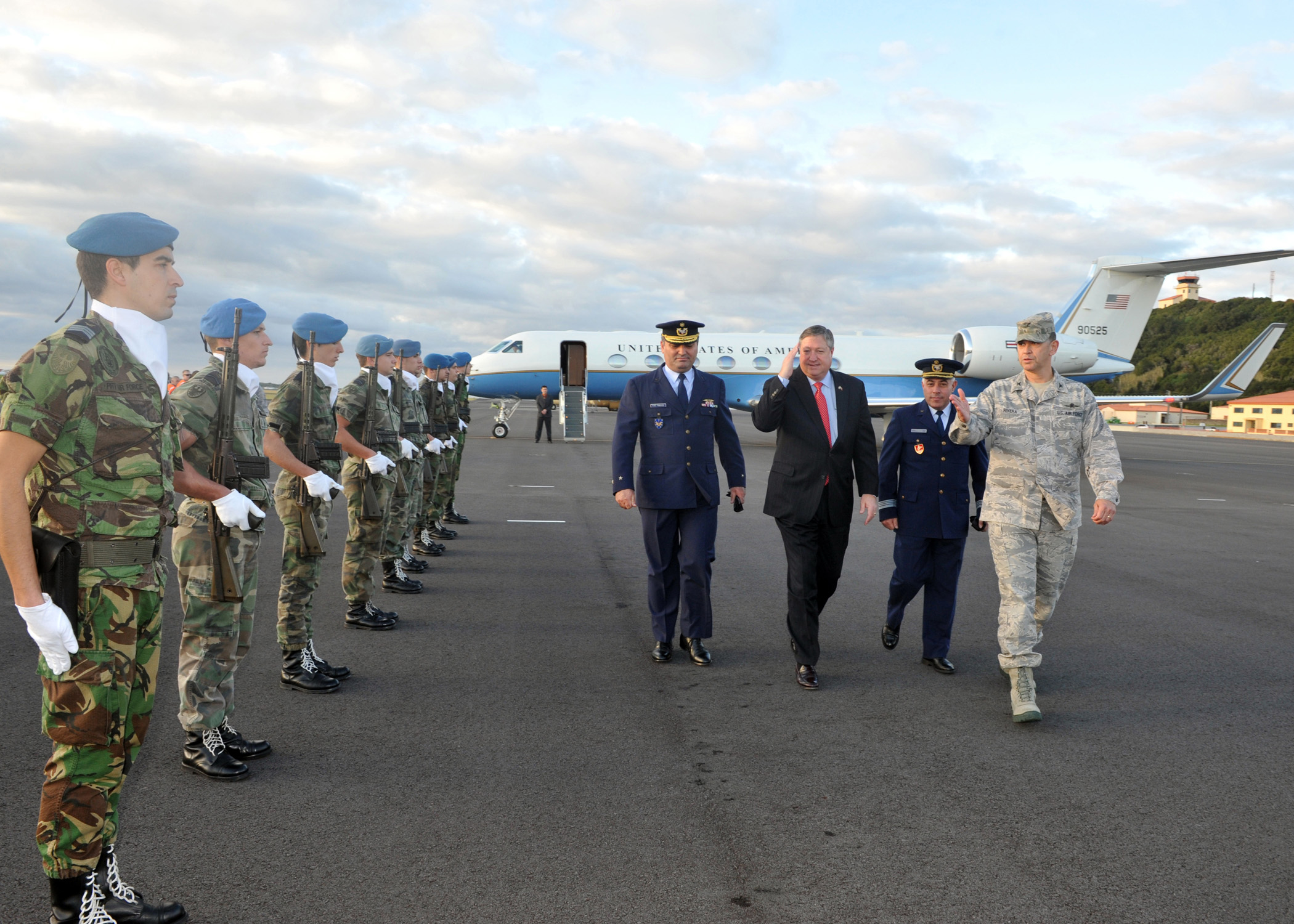
Air Force Police light blue beret

=== R ===
==== Rhodesia ====
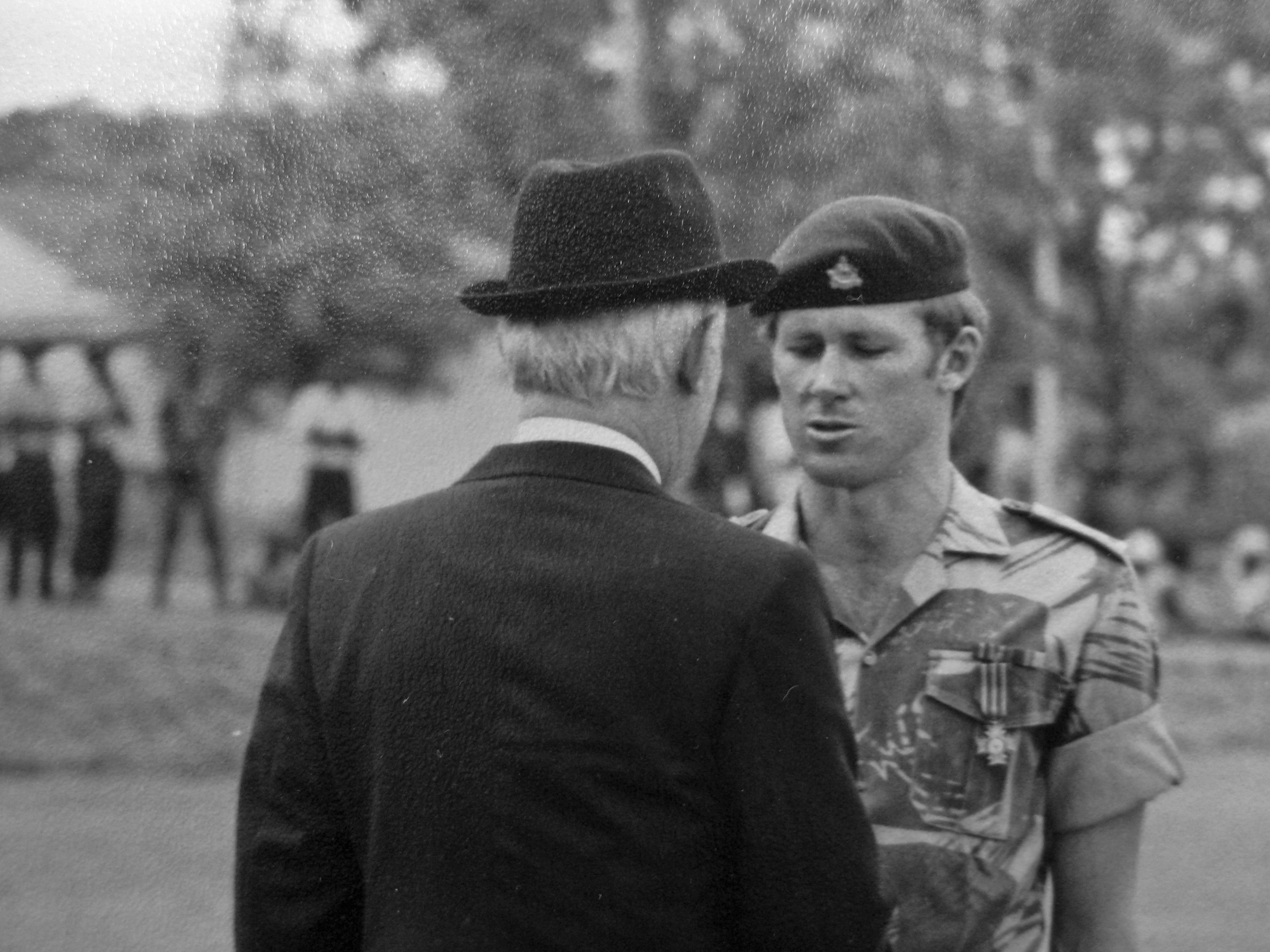
Acting Lieutenant Nigel John Theron of 2 Commando, Rhodesian Light Infantry, receives the Bronze Cross of Rhodesia in 1976.

Zimbabwe-Rhodesia made changes to the army in 1979 and shortly after Zimbabwe disbanded all the regiments Rhodesian Security Forces in favour of the Zimbabwe Defence Forces in 1979–1981. Up to this point the Security Forces wore the beret as the primary working dress and service dress headgear. Like most countries formerly associated with the British Empire, Berets were coloured according to unit or service branch, with a distinctive regimental cap badge pinned above the left eye. The Rhodesian Security Forces were integrated into the new Zimbabwe Defence Forces in 1980. Rhodesia introduced a brown beret as a new colour for use of the Selous Scouts.

Rhodesian beret colours were as follows:

Colour	Wearer
Grey	Grey Scouts
Brown	Selous Scouts
Black	Rhodesian Armoured Corps
Maroon	Medical Corps
Beige	Special Air Service
Scarlet	Internal Affairs Ministry and the Rhodesian Military Police
Green	Most infantry regiments, including the Rhodesian Regiment and the Rhodesian African Rifles, Rhodesian Intelligence Corps
Tartan green	Rhodesian Light Infantry (from 1964, when they were designated a commando regiment)
Dark blue	Generic - worn by all other units of the Army
Blue grey	Rhodesian Air Force parachute instructors
Bright blue	1 Psychological Operations Unit

Like the United Kingdom, Rhodesia also used flashes and hackles behind cap badges on their berets, such as:

- The blue, yellow and red shield on the medical corps beret
- The blue diamond flash on the military police beret
- The red outline of the Rhodesian Artillery beret
- The red tombstone of the Grey Scouts beret
- The red diamond hacking of the Rhodesian Regiment beret (similar to that of the KRRC)
- The Blue and White hackle of the 4th Battalion Rhodesian Regiment Beret

==== Russia ====
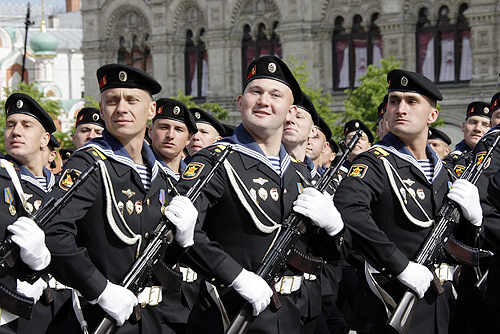
Russian Naval Infantry with their three-piece berets pulled left for a pass-in-review during the 2008 Moscow Victory Day Parade

The Soviet Union's beret color scheme detailed below (e.g. for airborne troops and naval infantry) remained in effect in post-1991 Russia. In the late 1990s the Russian Ministry of Extreme Situations introduced orange berets for its own troops. In the Soviet Union berets were sewn together from three pieces of material (top, front, and rear) with four air holes, two at each side, worn with the service badge centered between the eyes and draped to the right in most circumstances. When appearing in public on parade, the berets were draped to the left side so that the insignia shows to observing dignitaries and the public. The multi-piece beret has changed to a smaller beret molded from one piece of material with no air holes. In 2011 the Russian defence ministry authorised the wearing of berets by all non-naval military personnel as part of their field uniforms. The current beret colour scheme is:

Colour	Wearer
Black	Naval Infantry, OMON and SOBR units of the National Guard of Russia, FSB counter-terrorist units, Russian commando frogmen, Logistical Support of the Russian Armed Forces
Sky blue	Airborne Troops general issue berets, Spetznaz units of the Russian Ground Forces (will often wear headwear of other units in the field to avoid identification)
Cornflower blue	Special units of Federal Security Service, Federal Protective Service and Presidential Regiment
Light green	Border Guard
Dark green	Armed Forces reconnaissance units - soldiers are allowed to wear this beret after passing special tests
Olive	Russian Ground Forces standard beret, Strategic Missile Troops, Aerospace Defence Forces, Air Force, Railway Troops, National Guard Forces Command
Orange	Ministry of Emergency Situations general issue berets
Rust red (orig. Krapovyi)	604th Special Purpose Center, 7th OSN, 19th OSN of the National Guard Forces Command Spetsnaz - soldiers are allowed to wear this beret after passing special tests
Bright red	Military Police (since 2010), Young Army Cadets National Movement

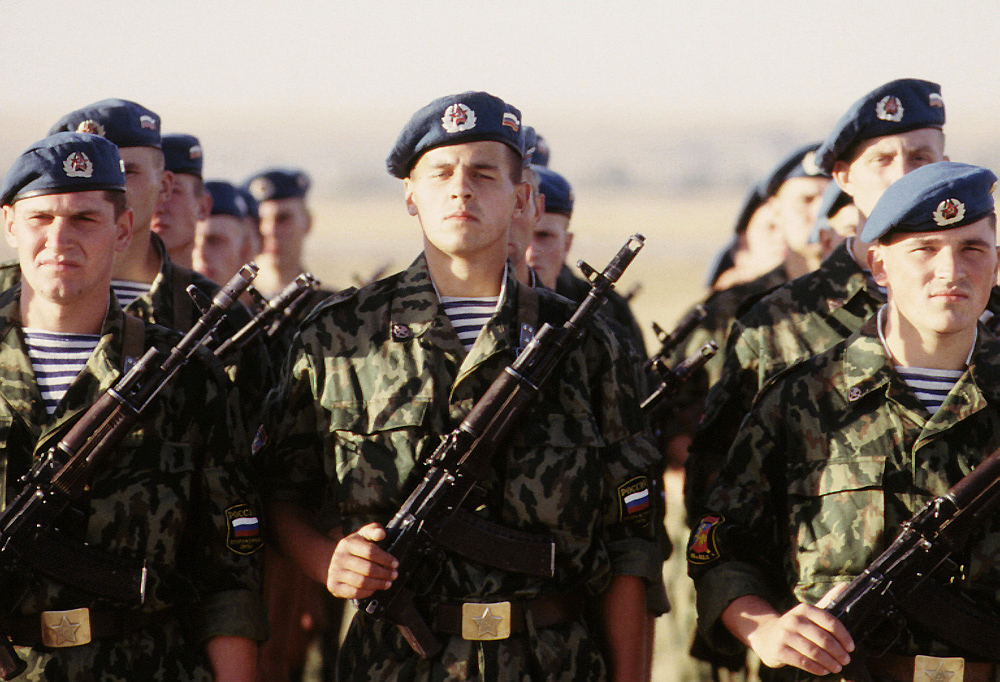
Russian Paratroopers 106th VDD

Olive and Red beret wearing National Guardsman on the Day of Remembrance

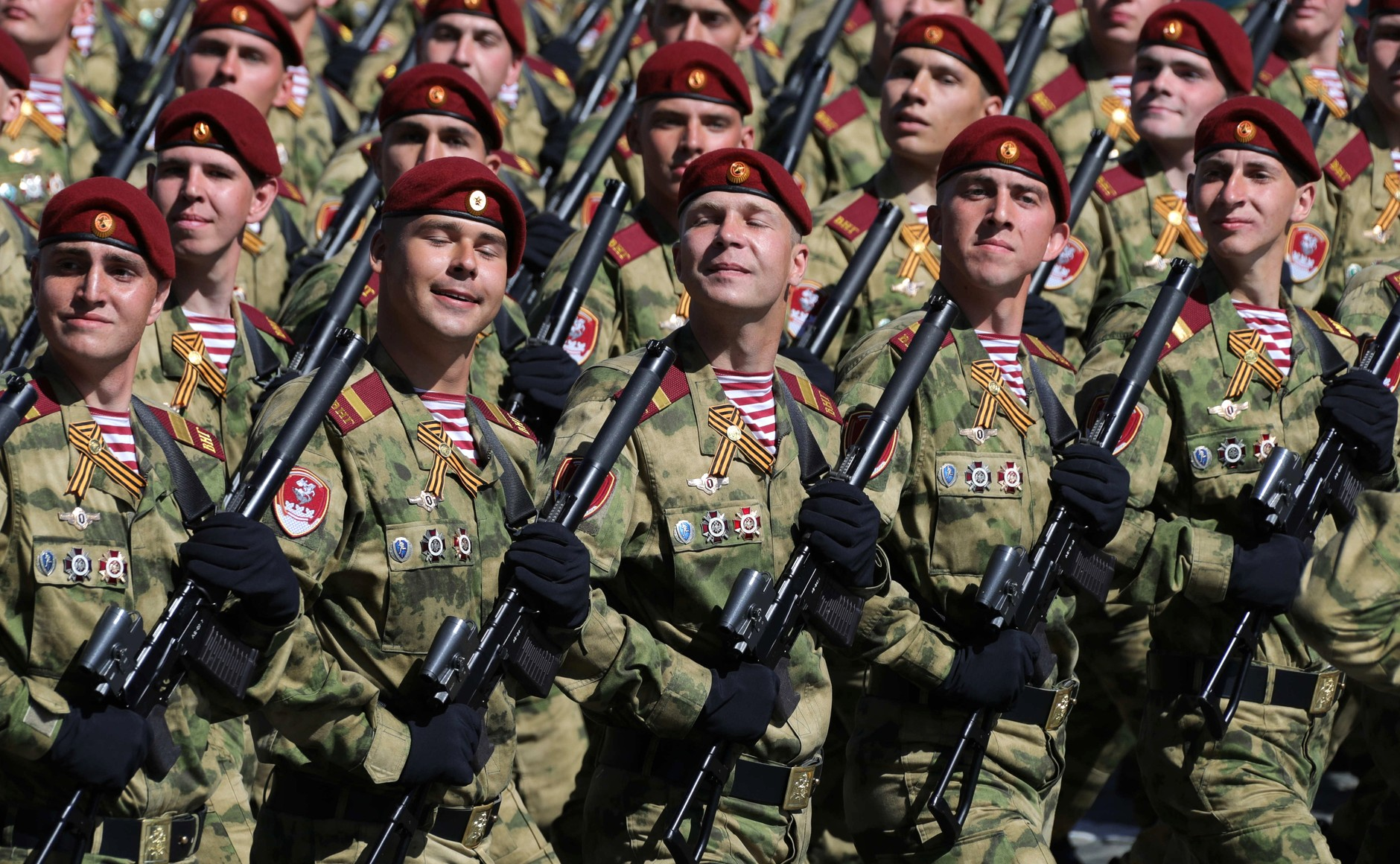
National Guard troops wearing maroon berets in the 2018 Moscow Victory Day Parade

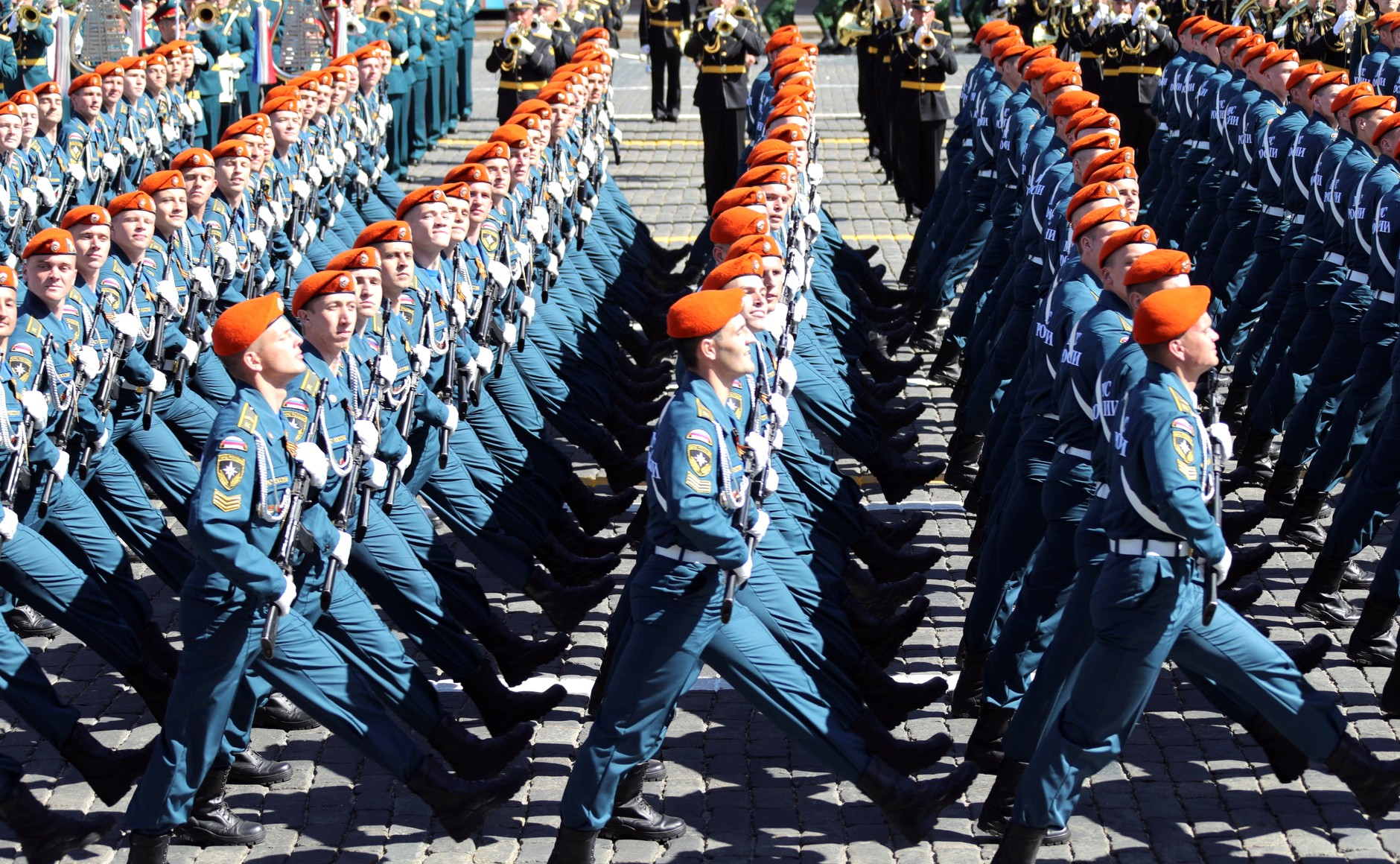
EMERCOM troops marching in the 2018 Moscow Victory Day Parade.

=== S ===
==== Saudi Arabia ====
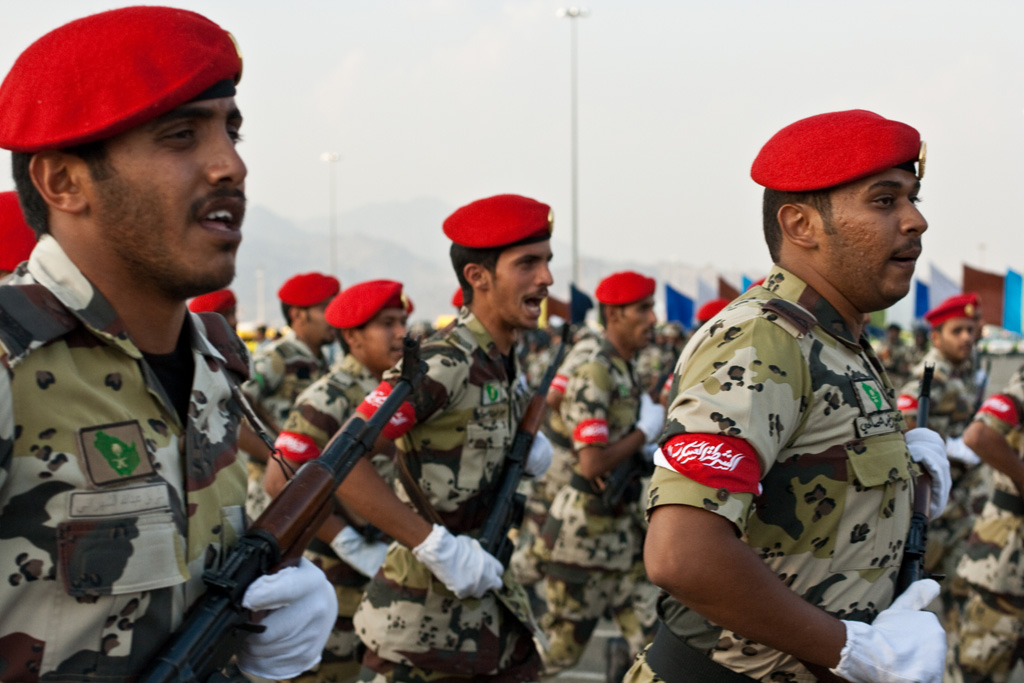
Saudi military police

Armed Forces of Saudi Arabia
Colour	Worn by
Olive green	Royal Saudi Land Forces
Dark blue	Royal Saudi Air Force
Black	Royal Saudi Navy
Dark green	Royal Saudi Air Defense
Red	Military Police of the Armed Forces of Saudi Arabia and Saudi Arabia National Guard
Maroon	Paratroopers Units and Special Security Forces

==== South Vietnam ====
American advisers assigned to these units wore the berets.

- Red – Paratroopers
- Green – Marines, LLDB
- Maroon – Rangers
- Black – Navy Junk Force
- Black – Palace guards
- Tan – political officers

==== Spain ====
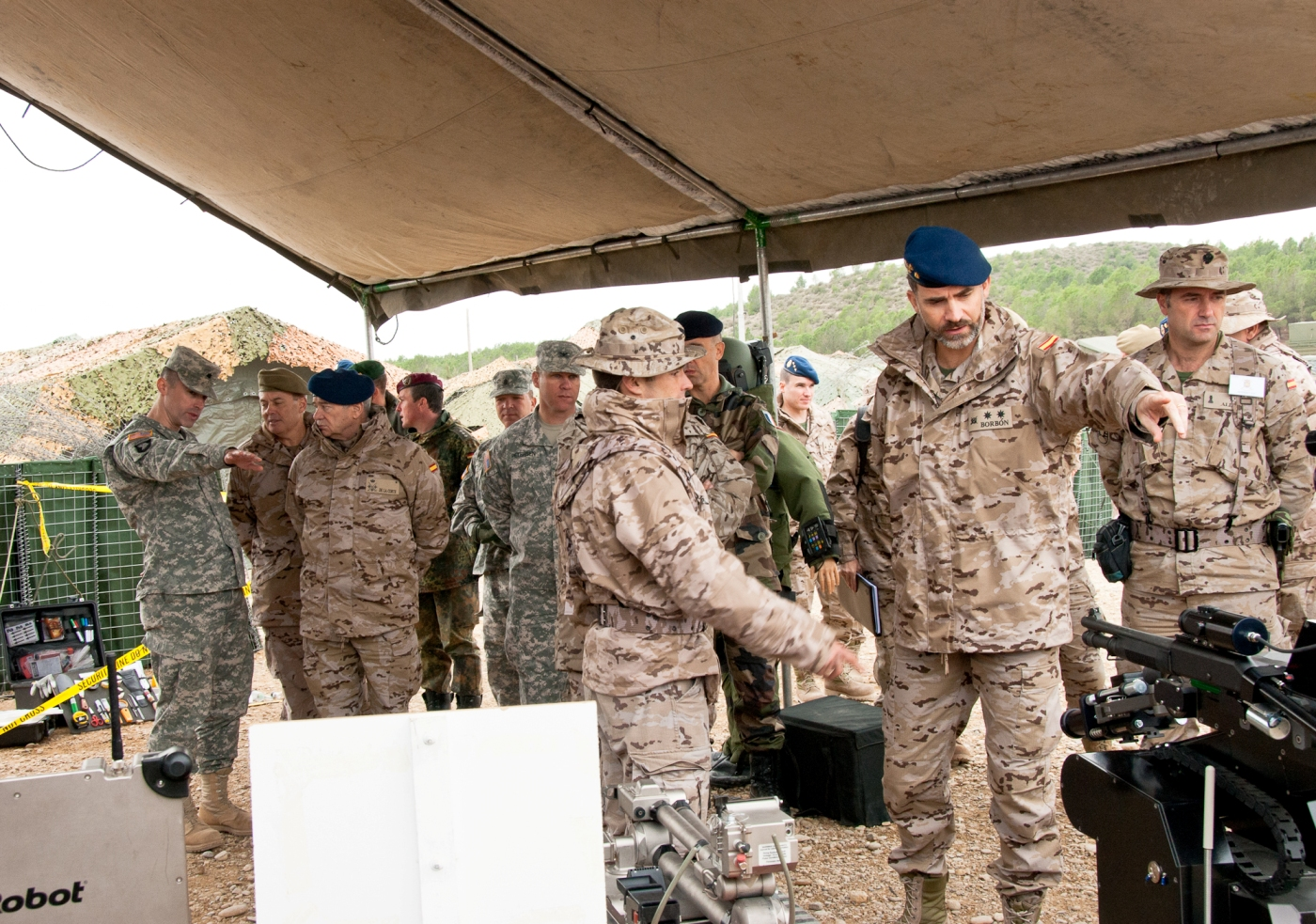
Spain's Crown Prince Felipe de Borbon (in blue beret of the Royal Guard) speaks with a Spanish engineer soldier about the capabilities of a bomb disposal robot during a visit to Spain's San Gregorio training area to meet with participants in exercise Interdict 12, Oct. 30.

The beret is used in the various armed forces of Spain. The colours used are:

Colour	Wearer
Black	Paratroopers Brigade "Almogávares" VI (BRIPAC), Infantry, Mechanized Division "Guzmán el Bueno" No. 10, Mechanized Brigade “Guadarrama" No. 30, Mechanized Division "Brunete" No. 1, "Extremadura" Brigade No. 11, Air and Space Force, Cavalry Regiment "Lusitania" No. 8.
Maroon	1st King's Immemorial Infantry Regiment of AHQ, Rapid Deployable Corps, Spanish Army Signal Command (MATRANS).
Royal blue	Royal Guard, Army Helicopters (FAMET).
Ash grey	Cyber Defence Joint Command.
Mustard	Military Emergencies Unit (UME).
Red	General Military Academy
Green	Mountain Brigade (Jefatura de Tropas de Montaña), Spanish Legion, Brigade "Rey Alfonso XIII" II of the Legion (BRILEG).
Dark green	Special Operations units (MCOE, MOE, UOE, FNGE, EZAPAC).
Olive	Spanish Army general issue berets.
Brown	Military Police.
Tan	BRILCAN (Brigada de Infantería Ligera Canarias XVI).
White	Regiment of the Guards of His Excellency the Head of State. (1949–1975, ceremonial)
Grey	BRILAT (Brigada de Infantería Ligera Galicia VII).

==== Soviet Union ====
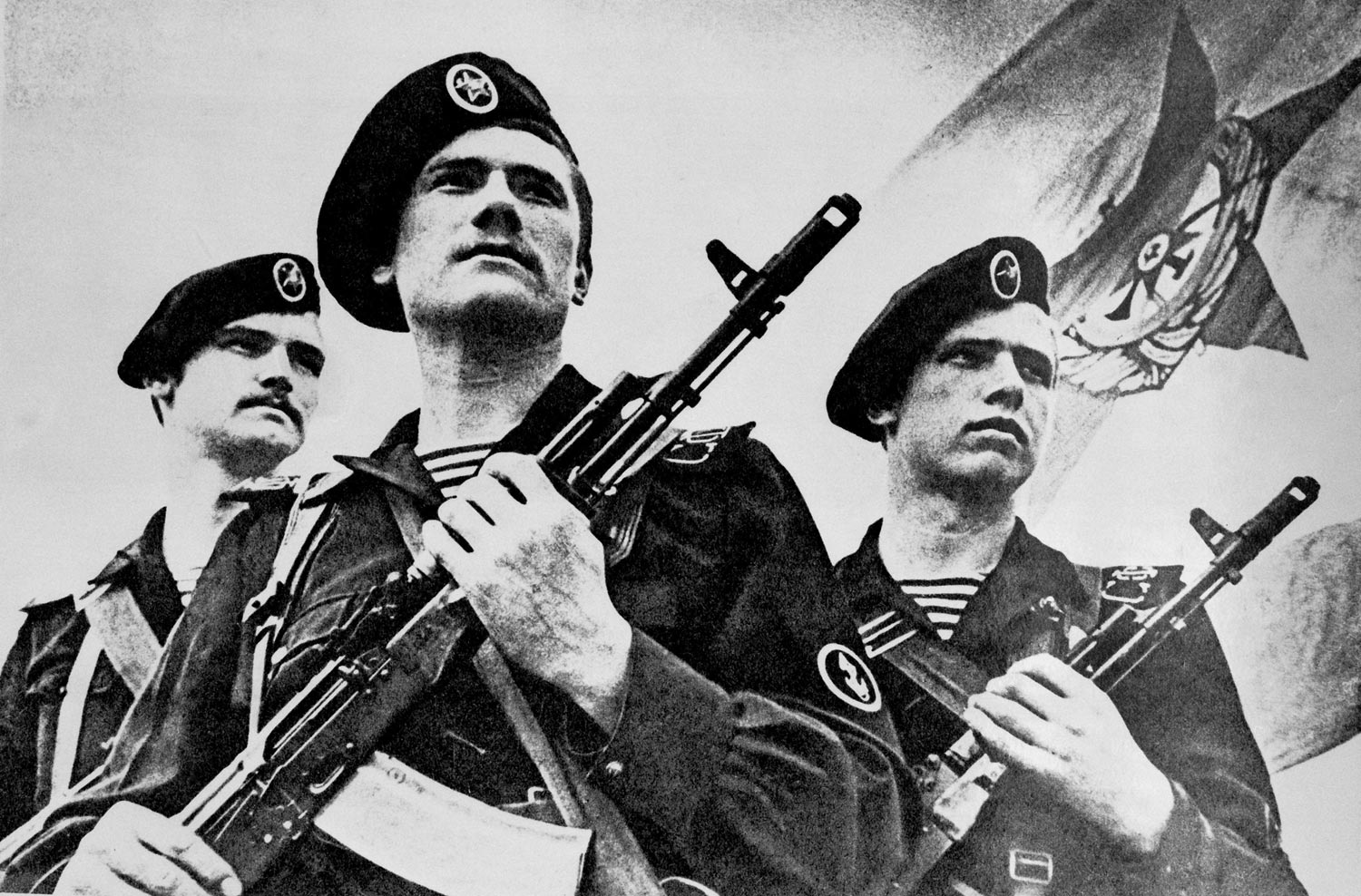
Soviet naval infantry in 1985

In the Soviet Union berets were sewn together from three pieces of material (top, front and rear) with four air holes two per side seam, one per each side, worn with the service badge centered between the eyes and draped to the right in most circumstances. When appearing in public on parade, the berets were draped to the left side so that the insignia shows to observing dignitaries and the public. Berets were worn only by:

Colour	Wearer
Black	Naval infantry, tank troops (only for coveralls), OMON special militia units
Raspberry	Airborne troops (till 1969, unofficially from 1963 with jump uniform only)
Sky blue	Airborne troops (since 1969)
Green	103rd Airborne Division (while subordinate to Border Guards in 1989–91)
Rust red (orig. Krapovyi)	MVD special troops (from end of the 1980s)
Blue	Navy (WMF) – as a part of working and technical uniform for enlisted and petty officers (officially matrosy i starshiny in Russian)

During this period berets were also worn by female personnel of the Armed Forces for everyday and parade uniform. The colour of the beret corresponded with that of the main uniform (e.g. Army and Air Force everyday uniform – olive, Navy uniform – navy blue or white, Army parade uniform – sea green, Air Force parade uniform – dark blue).

==== Sweden ====
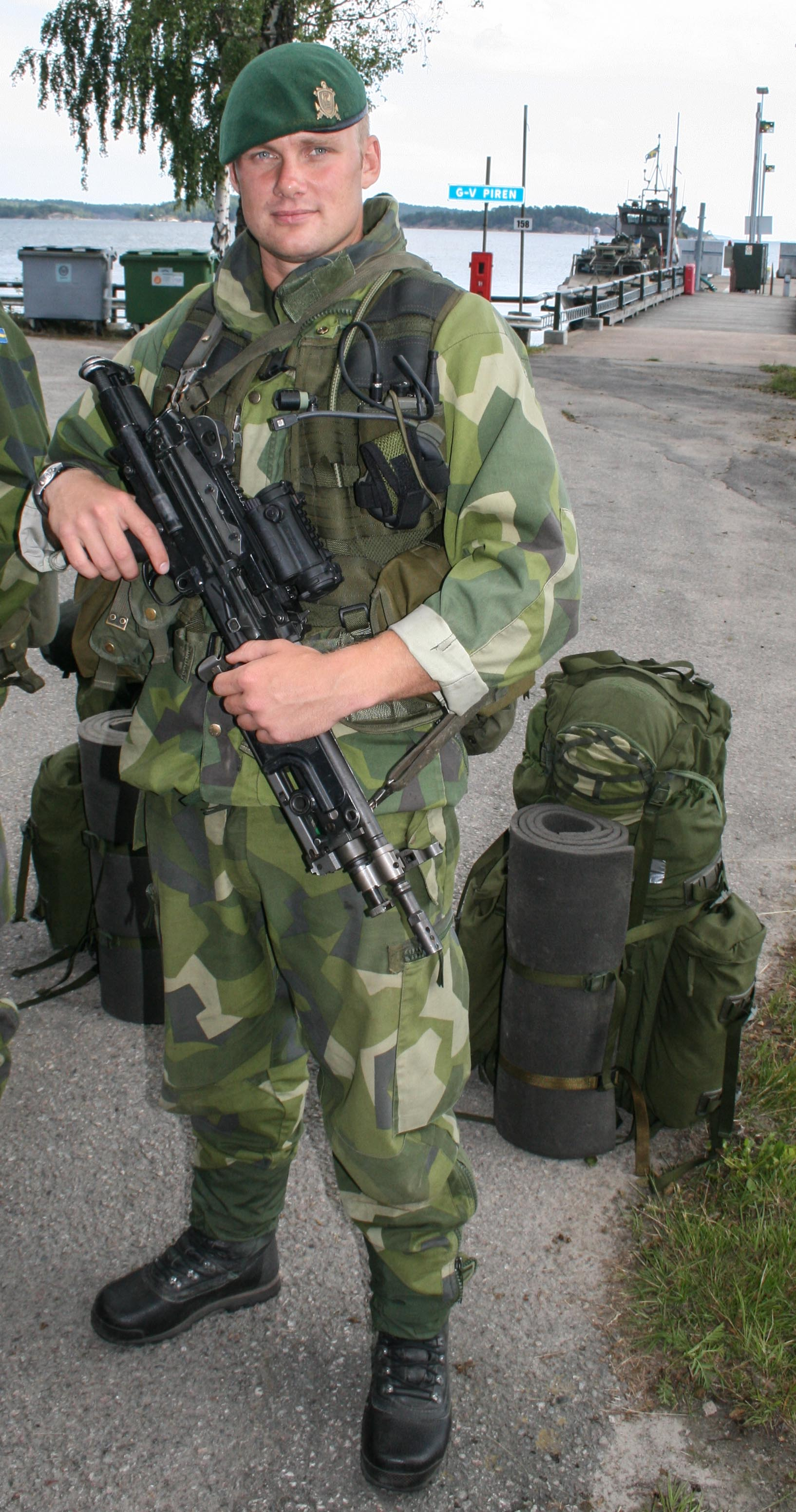
Swedish Amphibious Corps soldier with green beret

The beret is used in the various armed forces of Sweden.

- 2015 regulations:

Color	Wearer
Dark blue	Army unless otherwise stated, Air Force
Black	Life Guards (infantry), I 19, P 4, P 7, P 18, MSS
Rifle green	Life Guards (cavalry), I 19/AJB, LJG, SAFR, K 3, FMUndSäkC
Commando green	Swedish Amphibious Corps
Maroon	Parachute Rangers in the 32nd Intelligence Battalion and FskE/SFE
Khaki	Home Guard
Scarlet	Life Guards (musicians)
Yellow	EU monitors etc.
Bright blue	Swedish Armed Forces Helicopter Wing
Olive green	SOG, FM SOF according to the CO of the Special Forces Command

- 2009 regulations:

Color	Wearer
Dark blue	Generals in the army and amphibious corps, personnel in the organizational unit that have not assigned another beret color except the navy's naval unit (fleet)
Black	Life Guards (infantry), I 19, P 4, P 7 and MSS
Rifle green	Life Guard (cavalry), K 3, I 19/AJB (193rd Ranger Btn), LJG, SAFR and FMUndSäkC
Commando green	Amf 1
Maroon	Parachute Ranger Company in the 32nd Intelligence Battalion
Khaki	Home Guard
Scarlet	Life Guards (musicians)
Yellow	EU monitors etc.
Bright blue	Swedish Armed Forces Helicopter Wing
Olive green	Special Operations Group (SOG) and the Special Forces Command

==== Switzerland ====
Since 1995, when it replaced the grey side cap, the beret is worn with the dress uniform and with the personally issued battle dress uniform by all Swiss soldiers. In training, a black beret (without insignia) is worn by mechanised units, otherwise a camouflage-coloured field cap is worn instead.

The colours used are:

- Black — armoured and mechanised units; signals and headquarters troops; rescue troops; NBC specialists; intelligence, military justice and general staff personnel
- Green — infantry, musicians
- Red — artillery
- Deep blue — Air Force
- Blue — medical personnel
- Dark red — logistics troops
- Grey — military police
- Light blue — troops on UN missions
- Tan (Sand) – Special Operation Forces

=== T ===
==== Turkey ====
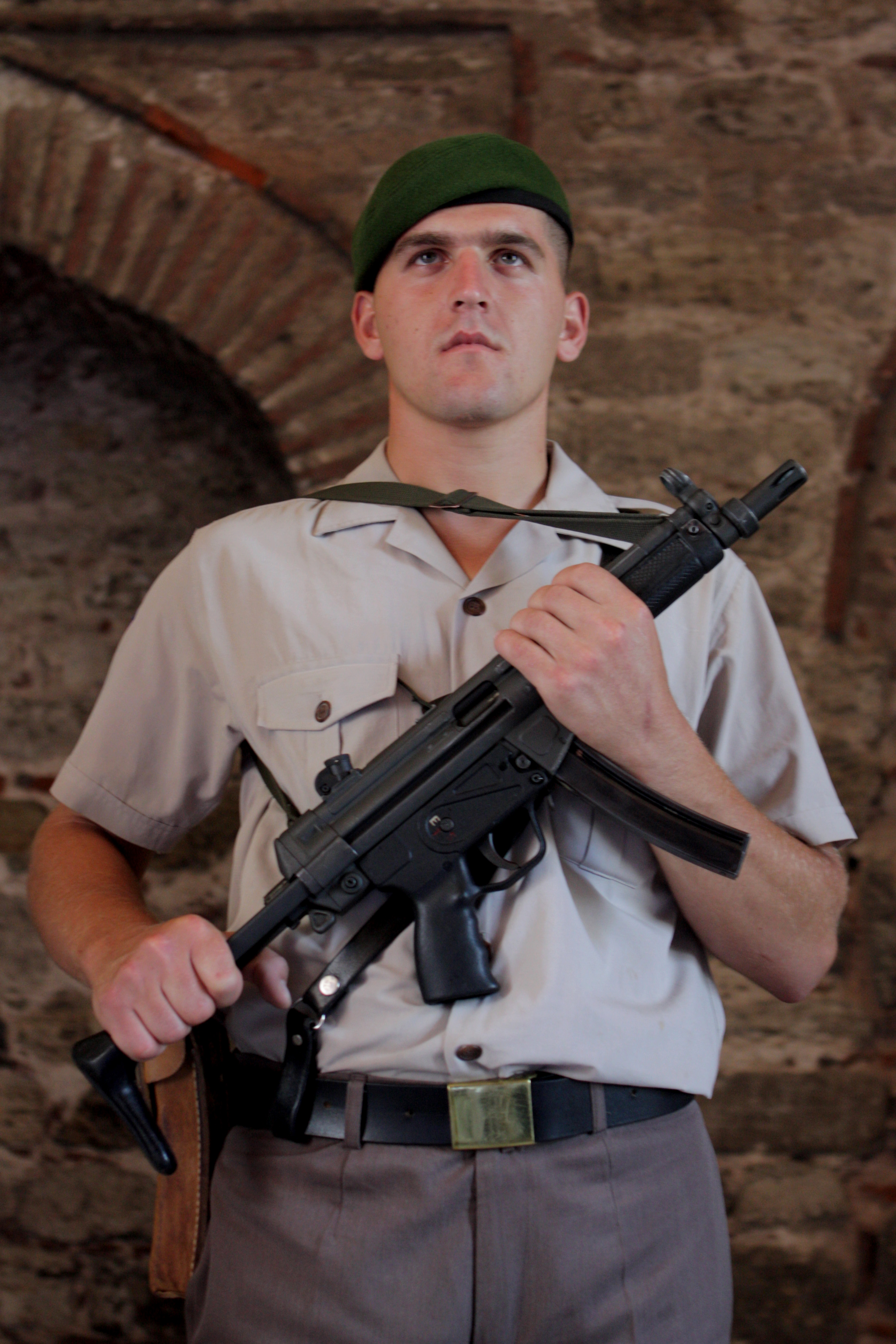
A Turkish conscript gendarme on guard at Topkapı Palace.

Colour	Wearer
Black	Armoured Corps.
Blue	Commando Brigades.
Sky blue	Personnel serving in United Nations missions.
Brown	Formal Dress.
Green	Gendarmerie General Command.
Maroon	Special Forces Command.
Navy	General Directorate of Security

=== U ===
==== Ukraine ====
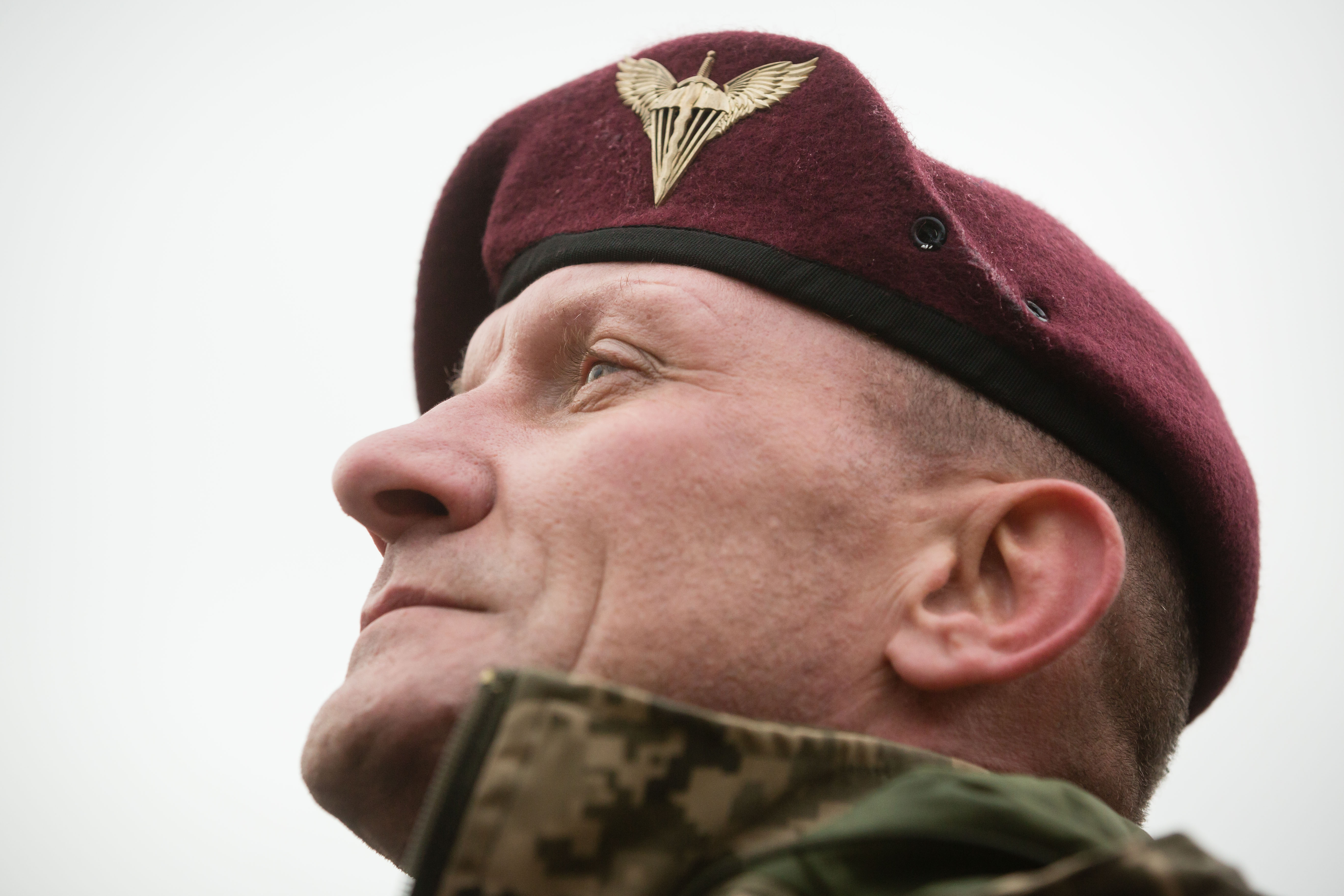
Ukrainian paratrooper wearing maroon beret

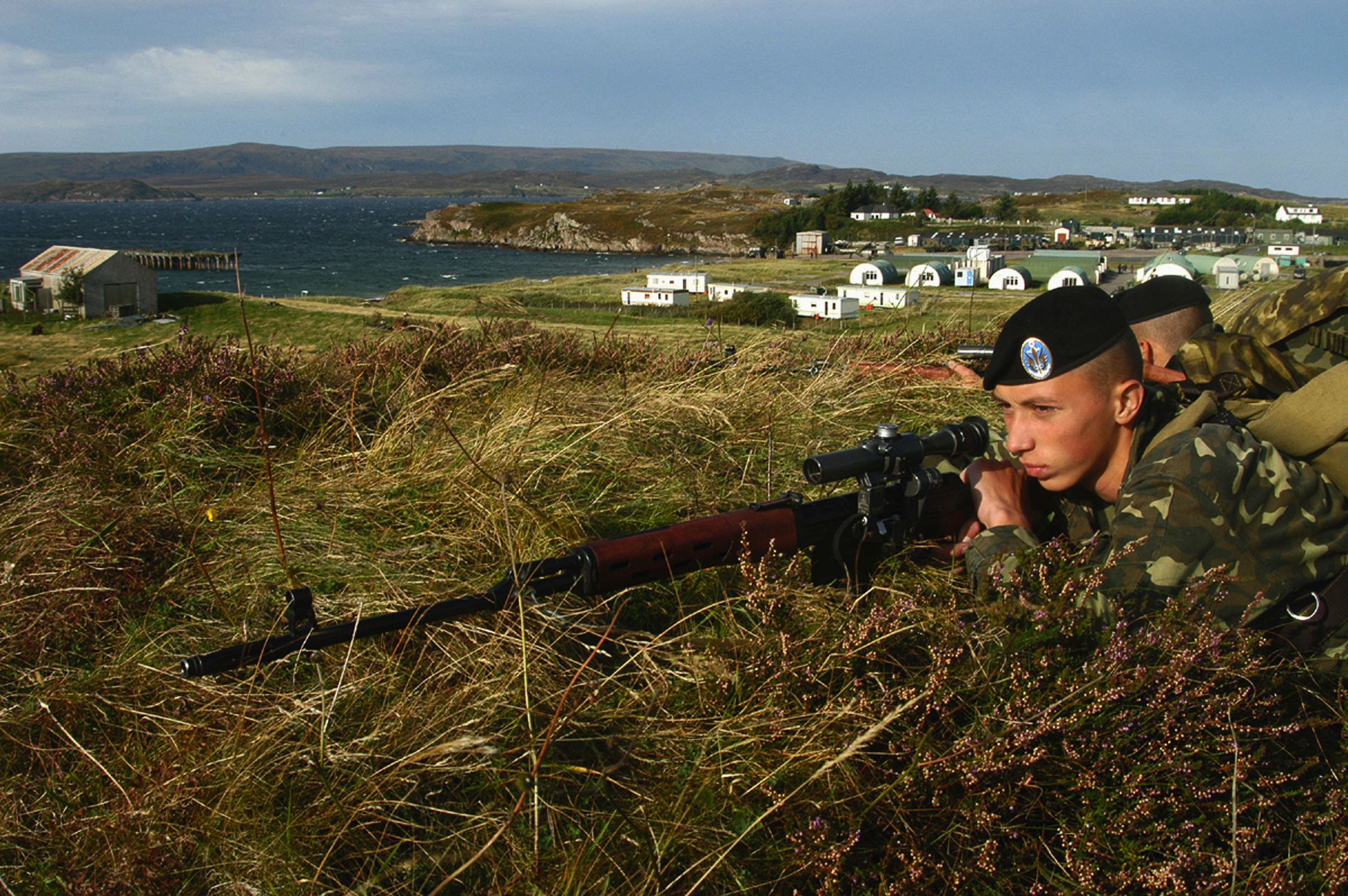
Marines in black berets, 2003

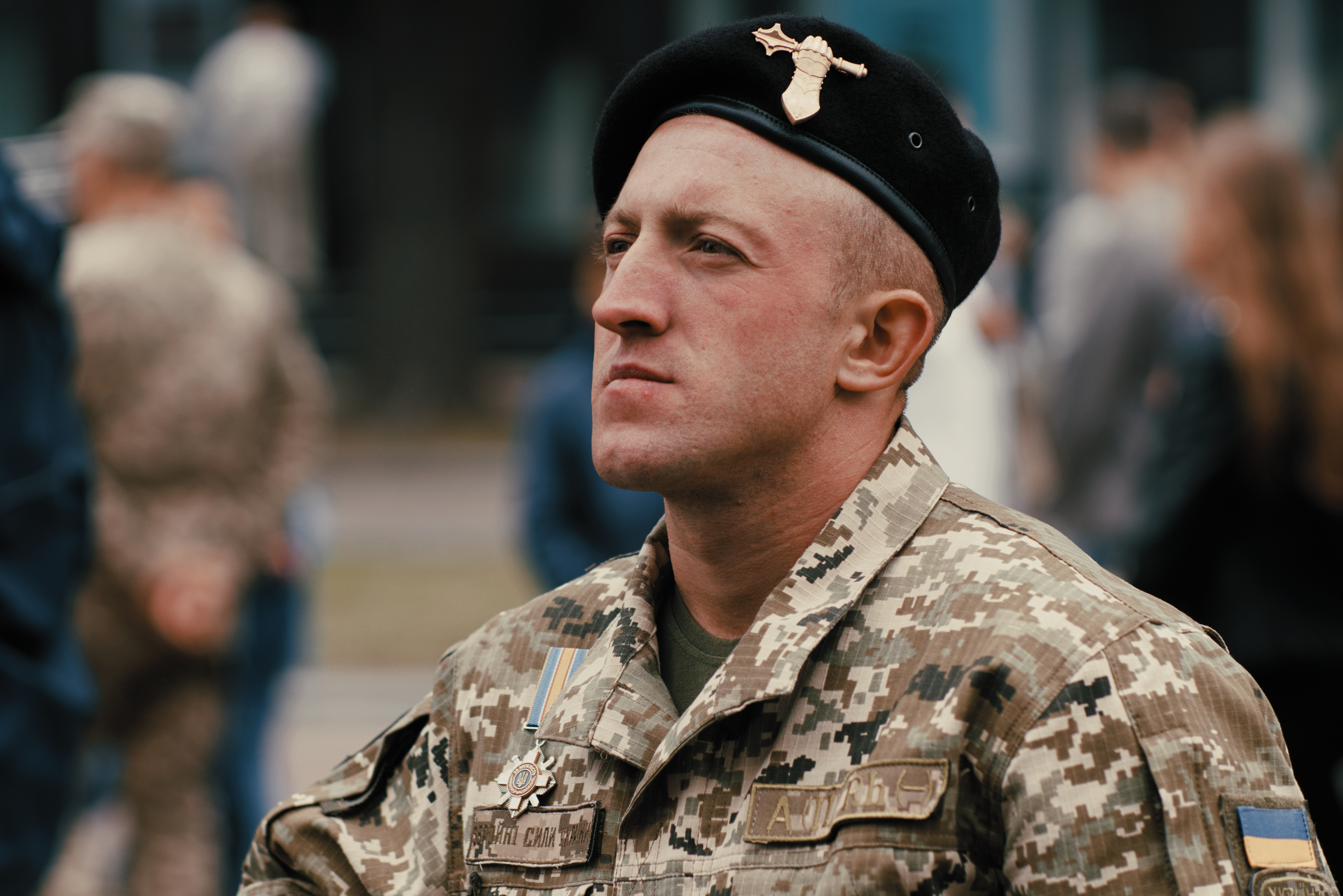
Tankman in black beret, 2017

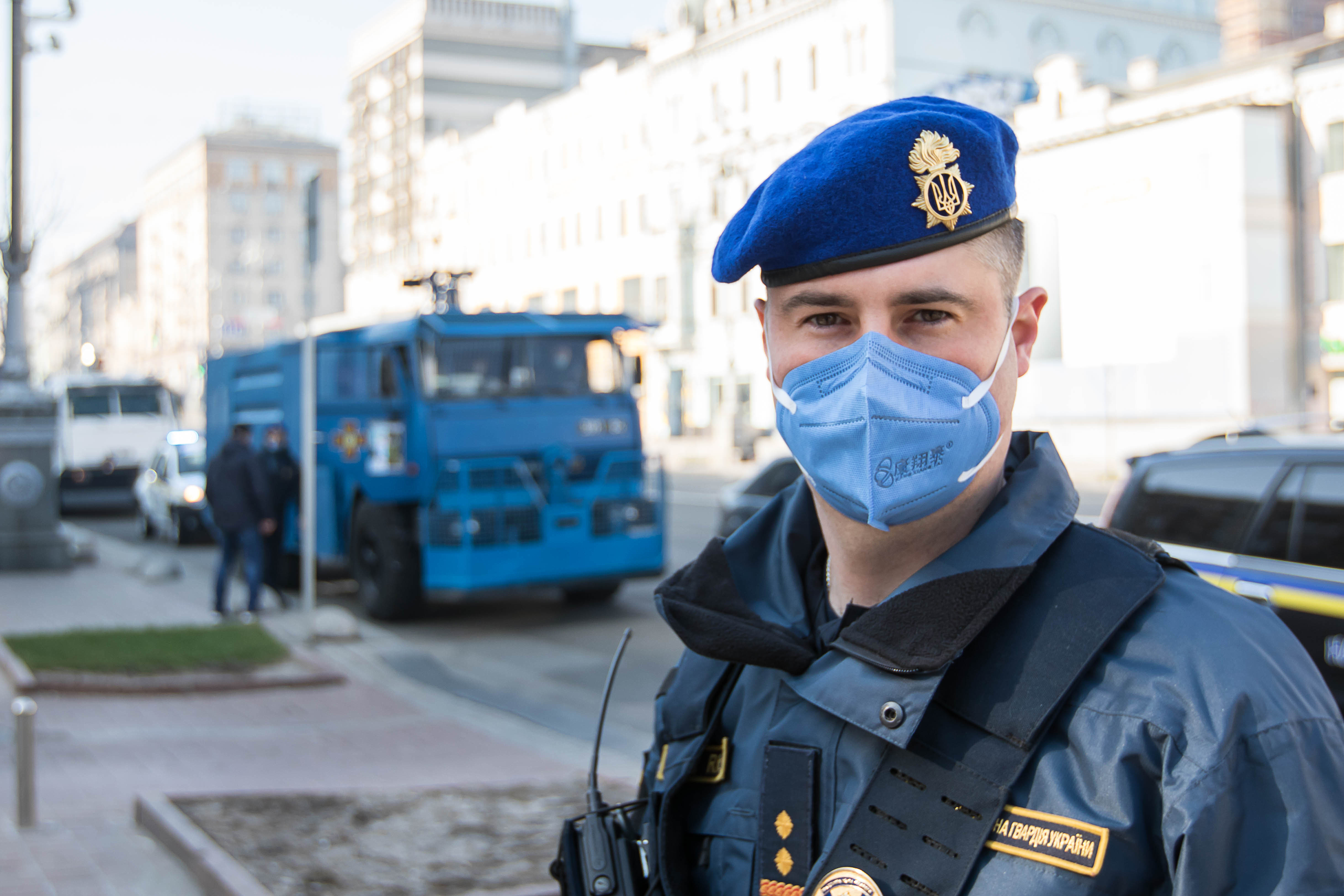
Ukrainian national guard, 2020

The Ukrainian Armed Forces continued Soviet beret traditions even after the dissolution of the Soviet Union, with paratroopers and marines respectively wearing blue and black berets. The start of the Russo-Ukrainian War in 2014 made the Ukrainian military distance itself from Russian and Soviet traditions. Starting in 2016, Ukrainian special operations personnel began wearing light grey berets, and the Ukrainian Air Assault Forces switched to western-style maroon headgear in 2017.

Since 2017, the Armed Forces have worn berets of the following colours:

Colour	Wearer
Olive Drab	Ukrainian Ground Forces general issue, including Mechanized Infantry
Blue-gray	Ukrainian Air Force
Dark blue	Ukrainian Navy
Steel grey	Special Operation Forces
Maroon	Ukrainian Air Assault Forces, formerly wore light blue
Flame	Rocket Forces and Artillery
Black	Armoured Forces
Dark grey	Mountain Infantry
Sea green	Ukrainian Marine Corps, formerly wore black (reinstated 2023 in armored battalions)
Light red	Military Police
Purple	Separate Presidential Brigade

Other formations:

Colour	Wearer
Green	State Border Guard Service of Ukraine
Blue	National Guard of Ukraine, formerly wore Red

==== United Arab Emirates ====
The Armed Forces of the UAE and National Service use berets with distinct colours to display the specific branch of the armed forces. All berets displays the United Arab Emirates Armed Forces emblem.

Emirati military personnel may also choose to wear military camo coloured ghutra in a turban fashion in keeping with traditional Arabic attire.

The colours are as follows:

Colour	Wearer
Blue	United Arab Emirates Navy
Green	Military recruit
Red	Military police
Sky blue	United Arab Emirates Air Force
Maroon	Presidential Guard
Tan	United Arab Emirates Army and Medical Corps.

==== United Kingdom ====
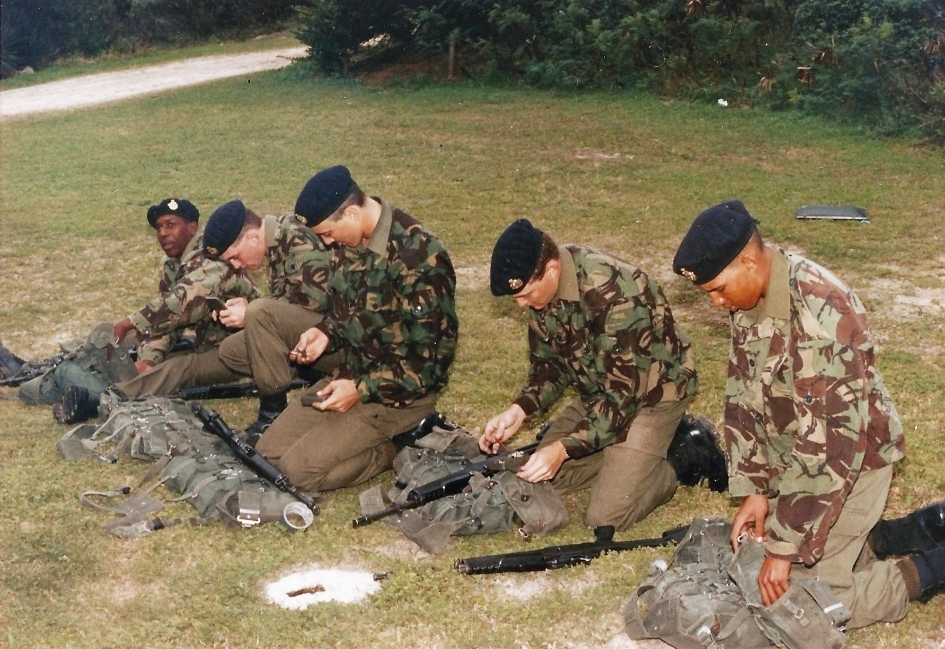
Royal Bermuda Regiment recruits wear generic dark blue berets.

The British Army beret dates back to 1918 when the French 70th Chasseurs alpins were training with the British Tank Corps. The Chasseurs alpins wore a distinctive large beret and Major-General Sir Hugh Elles, the TC's Colonel, realised this style of headdress would be a practical option for his tank crews, forced to work in a reduced space. He thought, however, that the Chasseur beret was "too sloppy" and the Basque-style beret of the French tank crews was "too skimpy", so a compromise based on the Scottish tam o'shanter was designed and submitted for the approval of King George V in November 1923. It was adopted in March 1924.

During the Second World War, the use of the black beret was extended to all the regiments of the Royal Armoured Corps in 1940. The maroon beret was adopted by British airborne forces in 1941 (the Special Air Service had adopted a sand coloured beret, was subsequently compelled to change to maroon in common with other airborne units, but resumed wear of the sand beret after the Second World War) and the green beret by the Commandos in late 1942. A khaki beret was worn by the Reconnaissance Corps from 1941 until 1944, and the Royal Air Force Regiment adopted a blue-grey beret in 1943. Later in the war, a rather baggier beret-like hat, called the General Service Cap, was issued to all ranks of the British Army (with RAC, parachute, commando, Scottish and Irish units excepted), to replace the earlier Field Service Cap. The GS Cap was not popular, and after the war was replaced with a true beret.

Today most units of the British Army wear a beret, however the Tam o' shanter is worn by the Royal Regiment of Scotland as well as Scottish UOTC units. The caubeen is worn by the Royal Irish Regiment as well as by Queens UOTC, (the Scots Guards and Irish Guards, however, wear berets inline with the rest of the Field Army). Many of these berets are in distinctive colours and all are worn with the cap badge of the service, regiment or corps. The cap badge for all services in the UK is usually worn directly over the left eye, Units who wear the Tam o’ shanter have different rules for the Tam with the cap badge worn on the left side of the head.

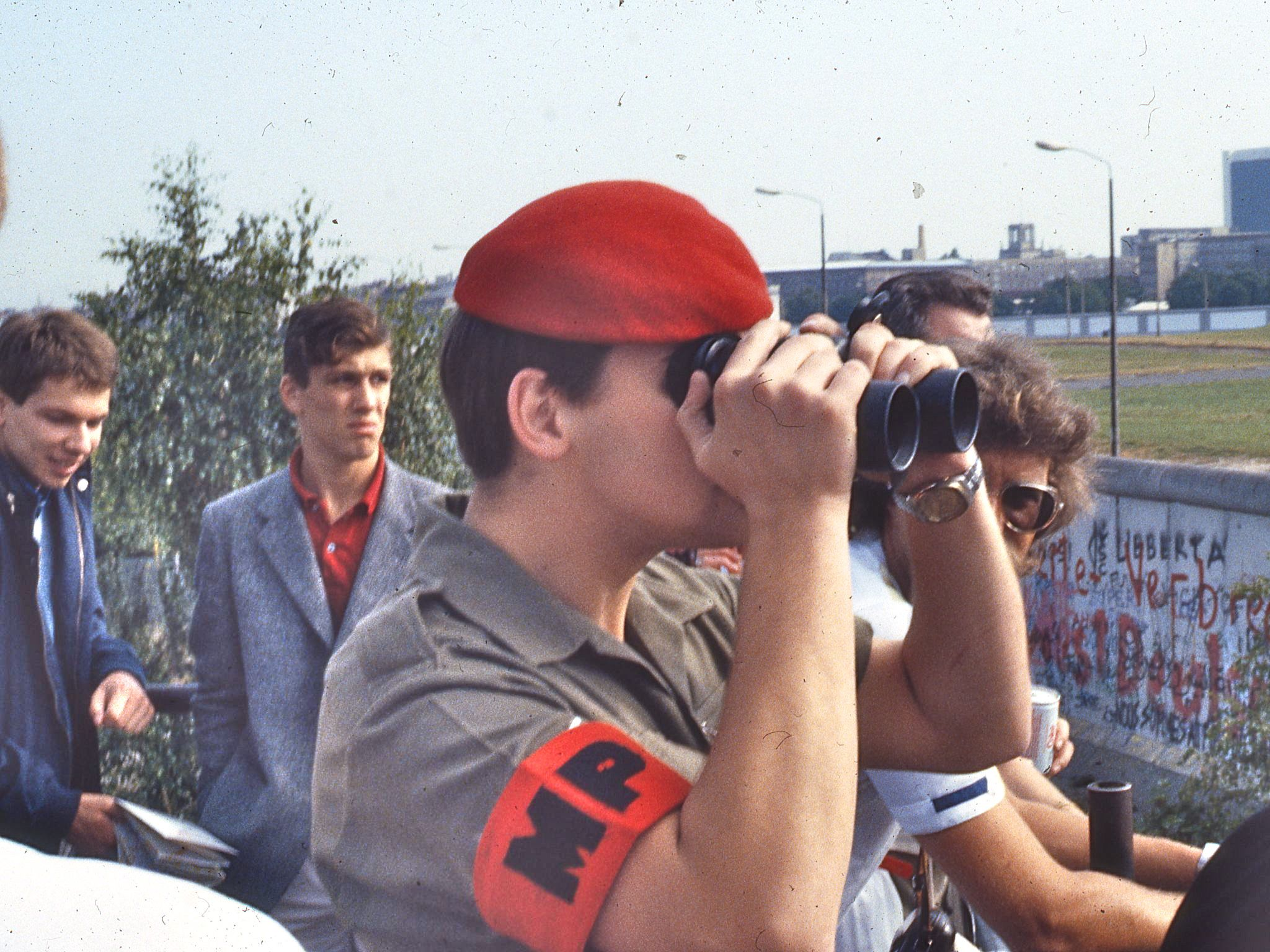
Royal Military Police, 1984

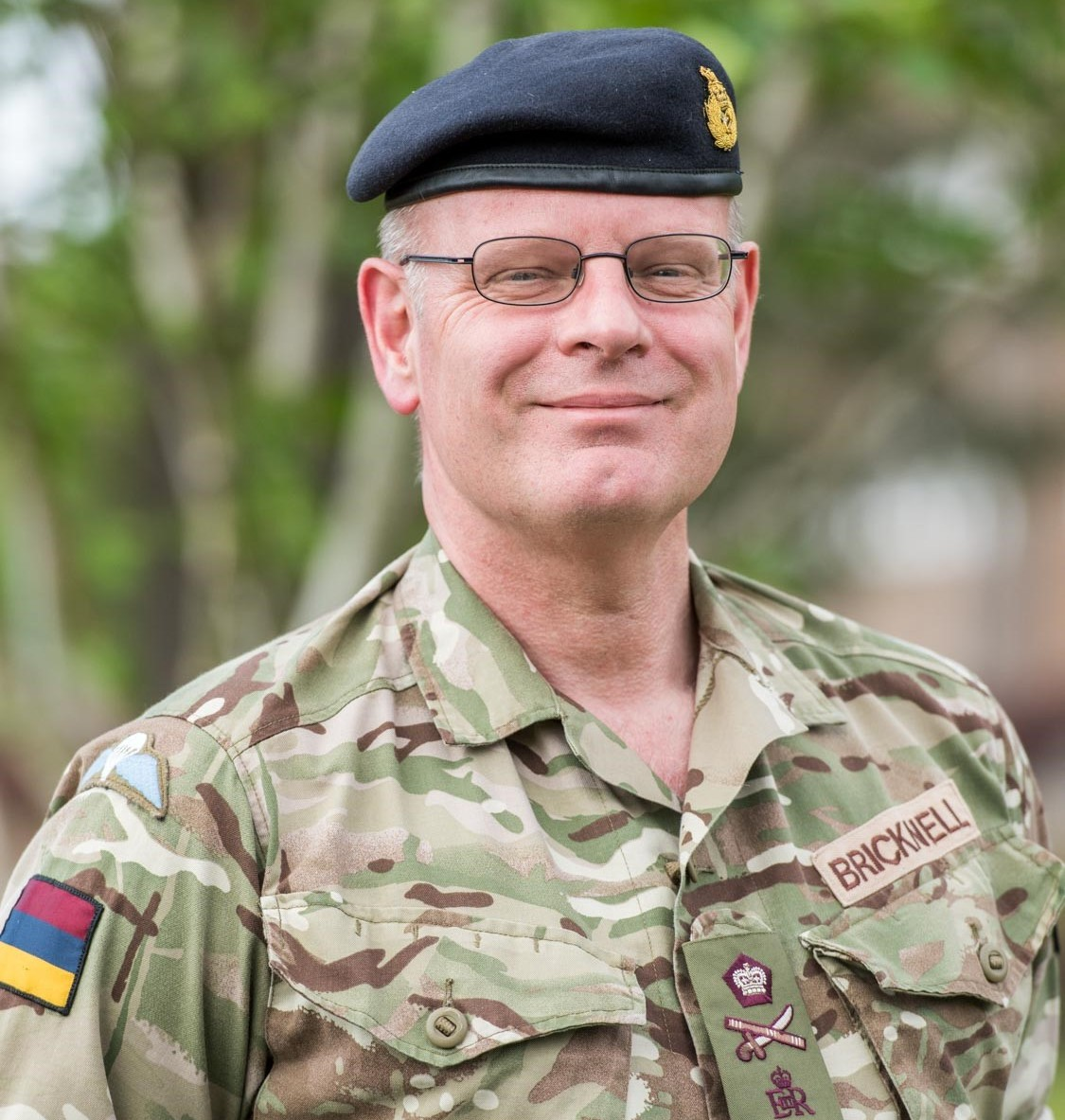
RAMC Lieutenant General Martin Bricknell wearing a dark-blue beret with ACDS insignia.

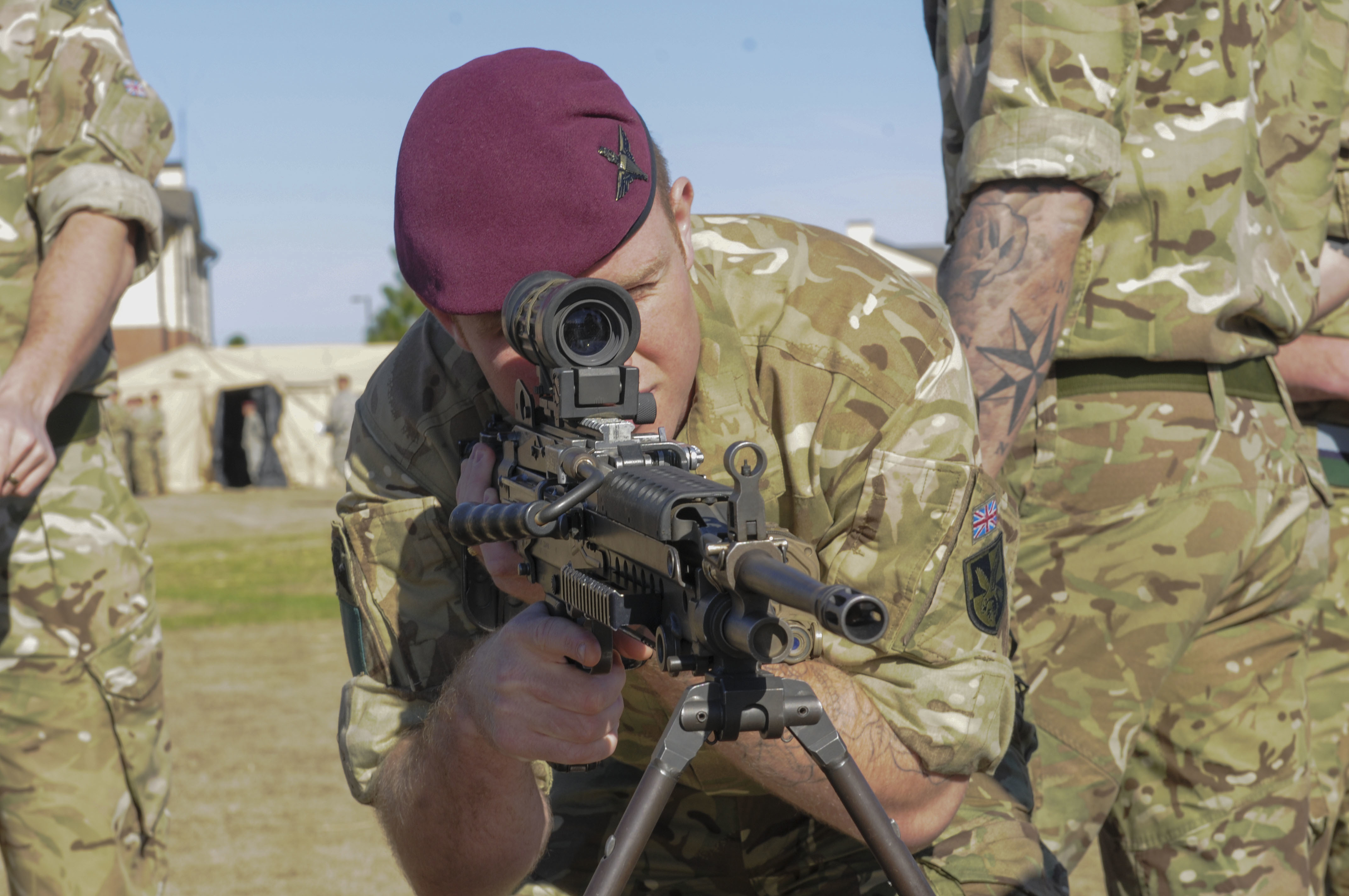
A soldier of the Parachute Regiment wearing the maroon beret

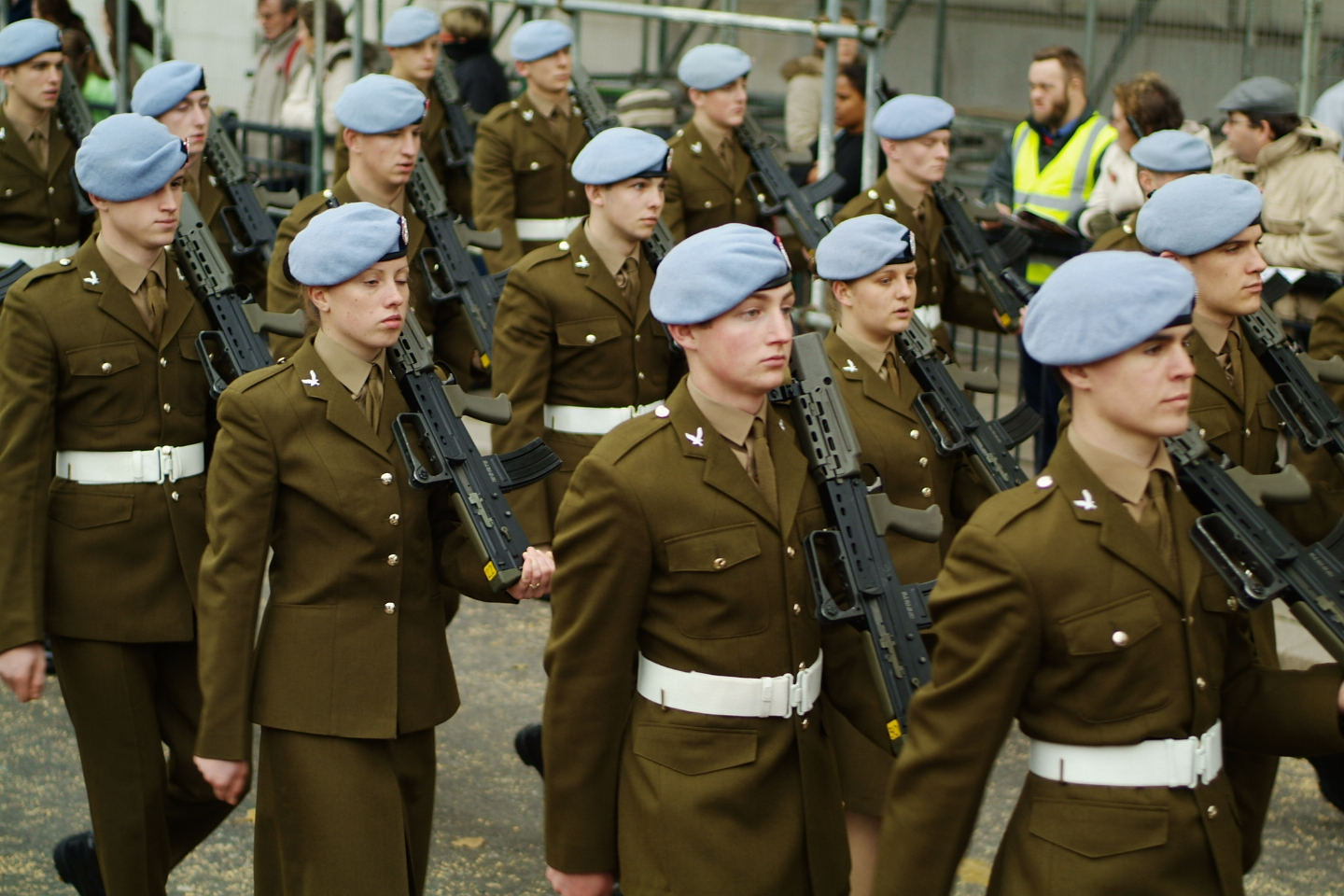
The pale "Cambridge blue" berets of the Army Air Corps in London, 2006

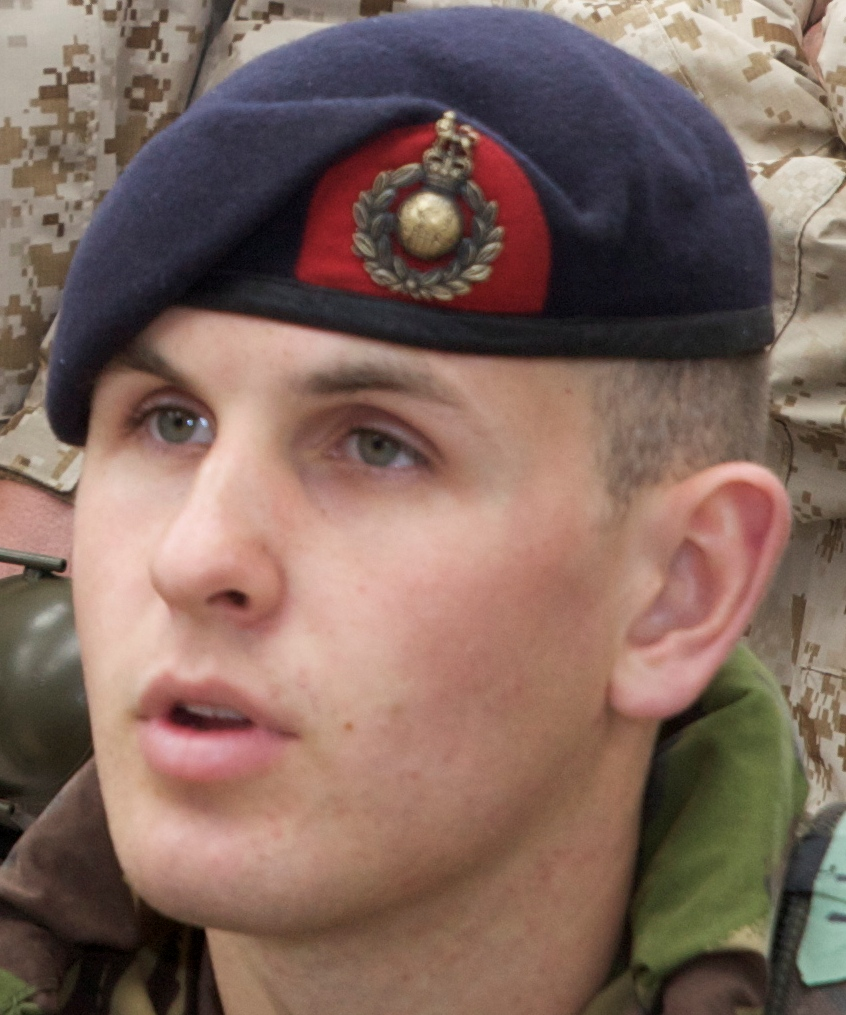
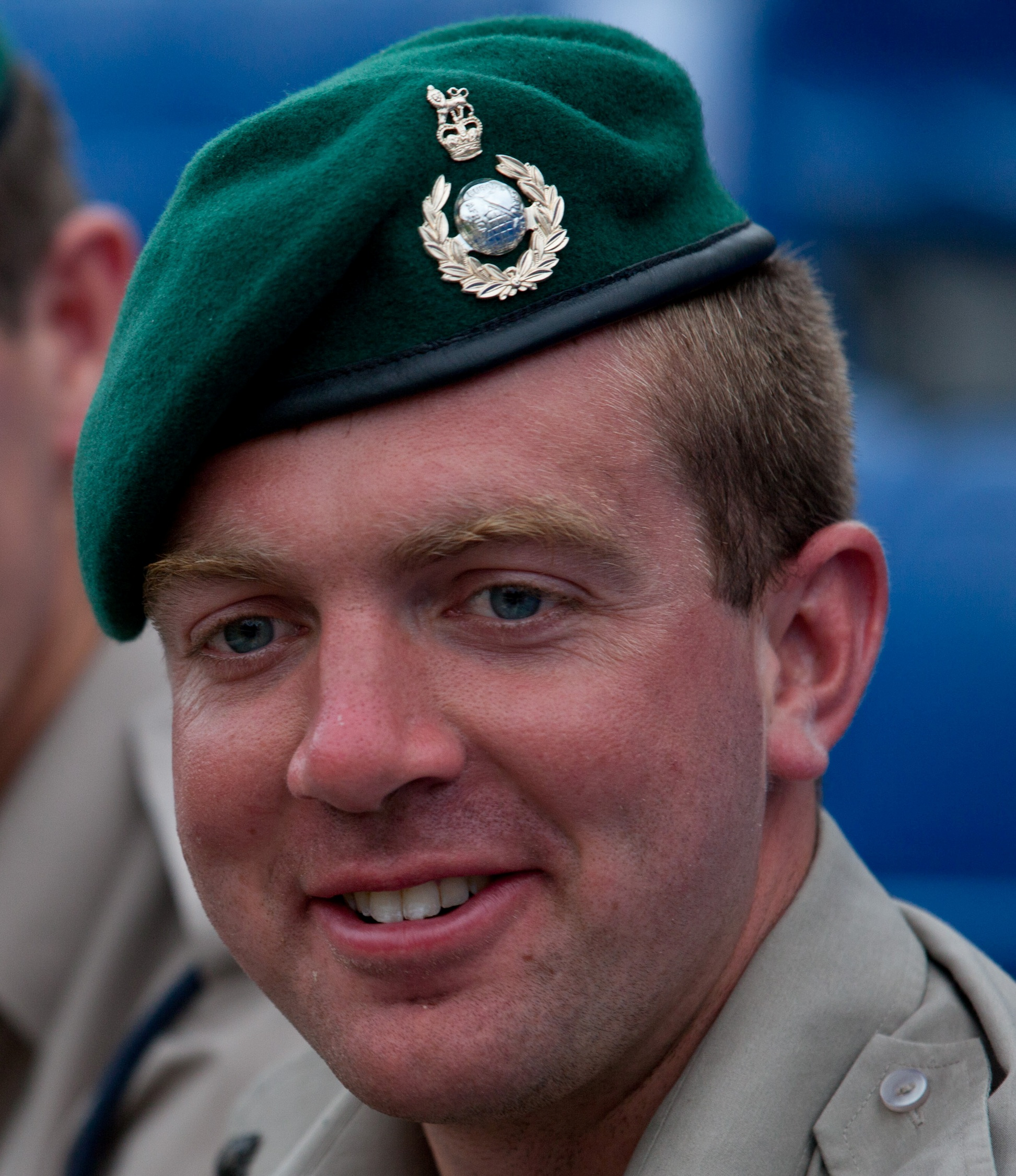
Royal Marine berets; blue berets with red cap badge backing are worn by personnel who are not commando-qualified, while green berets without any cap badge backing are worn by personnel with commando qualification.

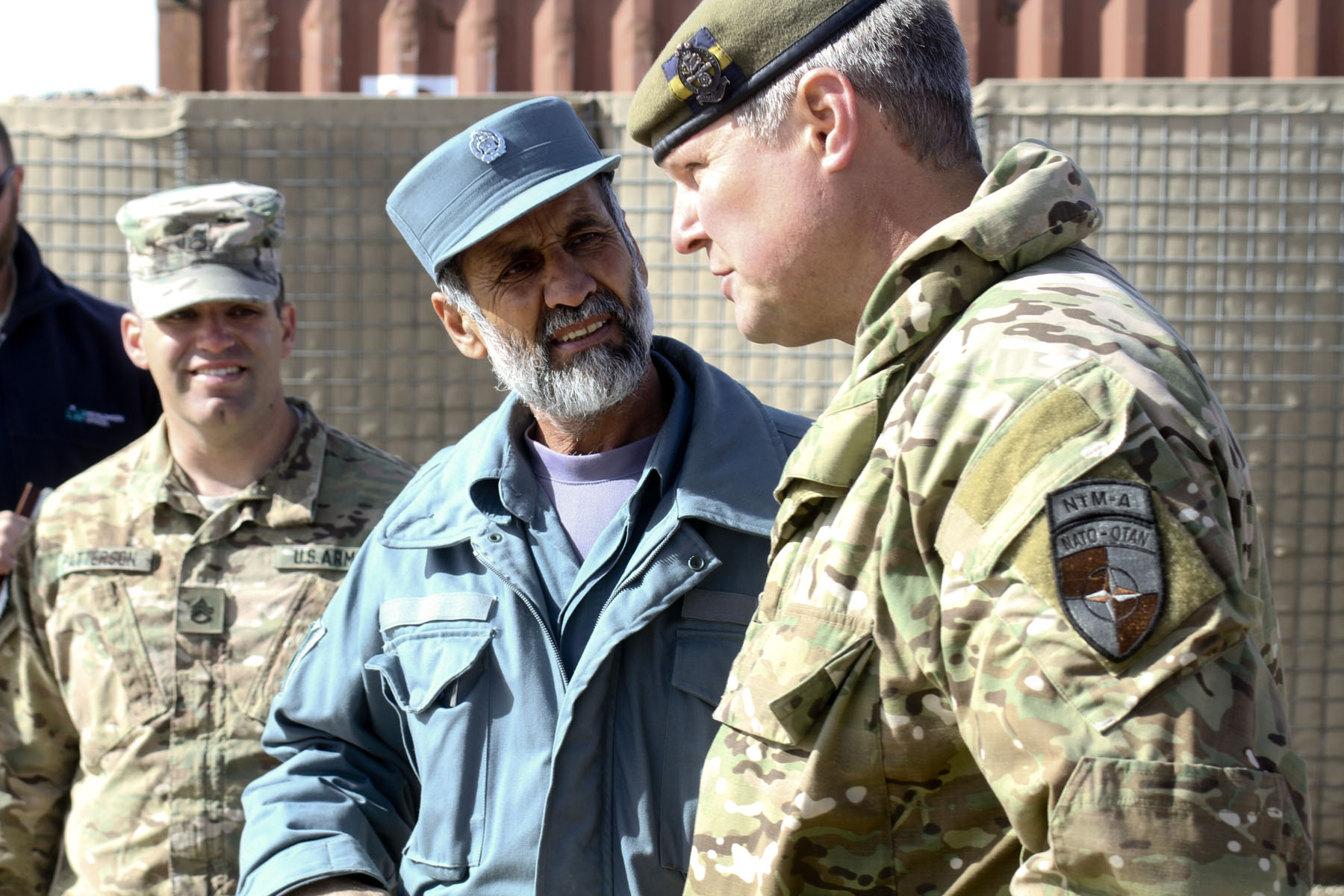
An officer of the Princess of Wales's Royal Regiment (on the right), showing the coloured backing patch behind the regimental cap badge

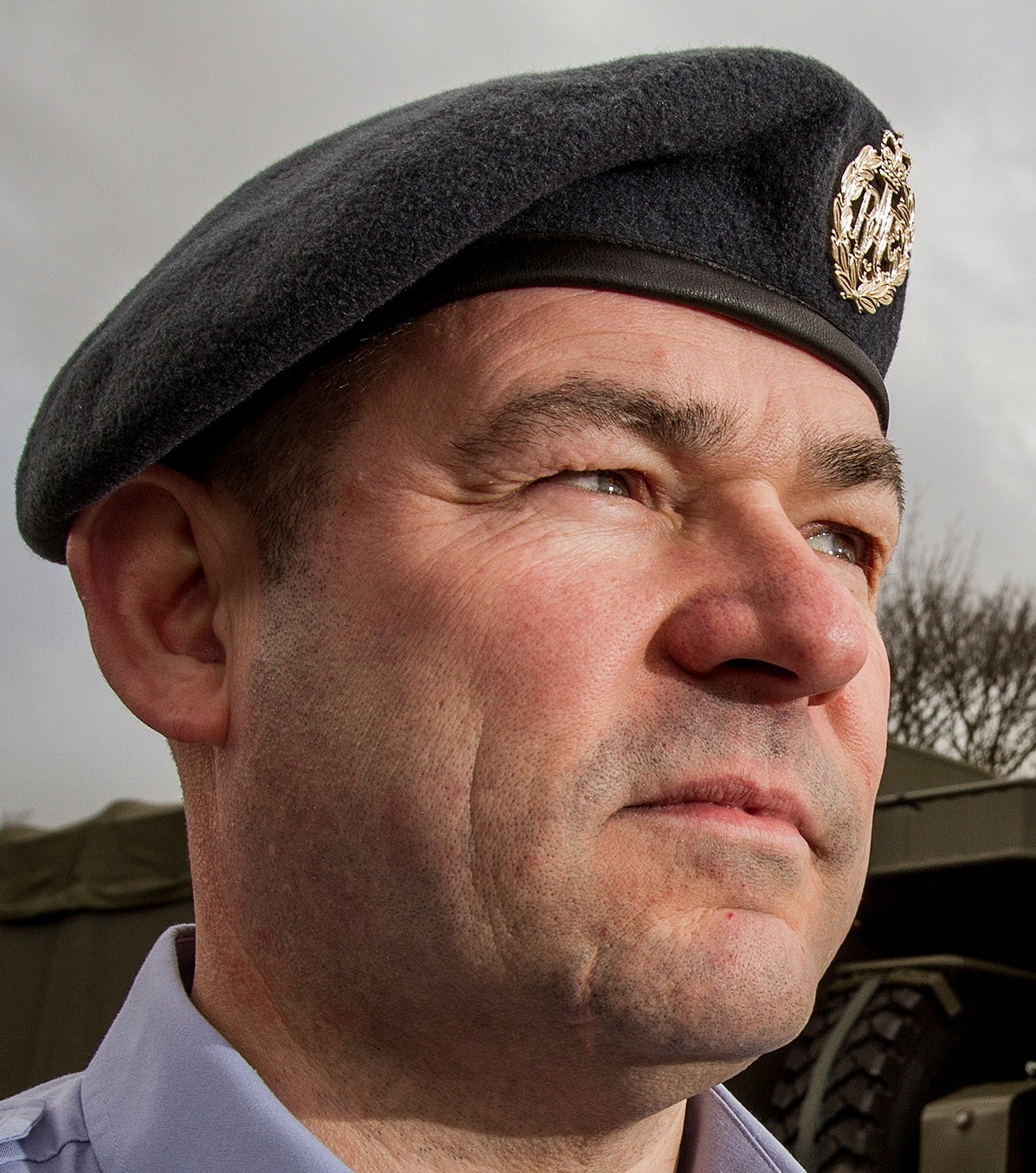
Royal Air Force airman wearing that service's blue-grey beret

===== Beret colours =====
The colours are as follows:

Color	Wearer
Khaki	Foot Guards, Honourable Artillery Company (before 2026), Most English and Welsh infantry regiments (except the Royal Regiment of Fusiliers [who wear blue], The Rifles [who wear Rifle green]), and 4/73 (Sphinx) Special Observation Post Battery Royal Artillery
Light grey	Royal Scots Dragoon Guards
Dark grey	Royal Army Medical Service
Gunmetal grey	Ranger Regiment, Honourable Artillery Company (from 2026, less A Battery)
Brown	King's Royal Hussars, Royal Wessex Yeomanry
Black	Royal Tank Regiment, C&S (Westminster Dragoons) Squadron, Royal Yeomanry
Rifle green	The Rifles, Royal Gurkha Rifles, The Royal Dragoon Guards, Small Arms School Corps, 36 (Essex Yeomanry) Signal Squadron, Queen's Royal Hussars (with green ribbon band)
Maroon	Parachute Regiment, All ranks serving with 16 Air Assault Brigade, A Battery, Honourable Artillery Company (from 2026).
Beige	Special Air Service including attached troops who are not SAS-qualified (a white beret was briefly worn on formation of the regiment in 1942 and a maroon beret from 1944 to 1956)
Emerald grey	Special Reconnaissance Regiment
Cambridge blue	Army Air Corps, 47 Regiment Royal Artillery, some elements of Royal Electrical Mechanical Engineers, any army personnel serving in an aviation unit.
Cypress green	Intelligence Corps
Scarlet	Royal Military Police
Green	Adjutant General's Corps (except Royal Military Police, who wear scarlet; Army Legal Services Branch, who wear black; and the Military Provost Guard Service, Military Provost Staff and the Educational and Training Services branch, who wear navy blue)
Dark blue	Generic: worn by all other Army units (except Scottish and Irish line infantry regiments), Royal Navy, Royal Marines who are not commando-qualified who include recruits in training, musicians and instructors of the affiliated cadet organisations. (and who wear the Royal Marines cap badge with red backing).
Commando green	Commando-qualified Royal Marines, Commando-qualified personnel of all services serving in United Kingdom Commando Force, Special Boat Service
RAF blue grey	Royal Air Force (including RAF Regiment and Air Cadets (Combined Cadet Force and Air Training Corps)

===== Other adornments =====
Some regiments and corps wear a coloured backing behind the cap badge. These include:

- Foot Guards: blue-red-blue patch (less the officers of the Scots Guards, who wear a patch of Royal Stewart tartan)
- Honourable Artillery Company: black circle
- Princess of Wales's Royal Regiment: blue-yellow-blue patch
- Royal Anglian Regiment: small black 'tombstone'
- Queen Alexandra's Royal Army Nursing Corps: red patch
- Royal Army Medical Corps: dull cherry oval patch
- Army Air Corps: black patch
- Army Physical Training Corps: patch in corps colours
- Royal Marines: 'red tombstone' (only on dark blue beret worn by those who are not commando-qualified including Royal Marines Cadets)
- Royal Welsh Regiment and Mercian Regiment: green badge outline and square respectively
- Queen's Royal Lancers: red patch
- Household Cavalry: blue-red-blue patch
- The Royal Dragoon Guards: red diamond patch
- Yorkshire Regiment: Brunswick (British racing) green
- Royal Scots Dragoon Guards: black patch (worn in mourning for Emperor Nicholas II of Russia, who was their colonel-in-chief at the time of his murder)
- King's Royal Hussars: red patch
- Royal Wessex Yeomanry: black patch behind the cap badge
- Royal Gibraltar Regiment: red-grey-red patch
- Royal Regiment of Fusiliers: feather hackle on the beret. Other ranks of the Royal Welsh also wear hackles.
- Royal Air Force: Officer cadets wear a white disc behind their cap badge.

Members of the Royal Tank Regiment, 4/73 (Sphinx) Special OP Battery Royal Artillery, Royal Regiment of Fusiliers, Army Air Corps, Parachute Regiment, SAS and Intelligence Corps wear berets in Nos 1, 2, 3 and 6, Dress. Other English and Welsh Regiments and Corps wear peaked caps in these orders of dress. Troops from other services, regiments or corps on attachment to units with distinctive coloured berets often wear those berets (with their own cap badge). Colonels, brigadiers and generals usually continue to wear the beret of the regiment or corps to which they used to belong with the cap badge distinctive to their rank.

===== Old units =====
Former regiments and corps, now amalgamated:

- Dark blue – Queens Regiment, Royal Hampshire Regiment
- Khaki – Green Howards, King's Own Royal Border Regiment, Prince of Wales's Own Regiment of Yorkshire, Duke of Wellington's Regiment, Reconnaissance Corps, infantry motor battalions in World War II
- Dark (Rifle) green – Light Infantry, Royal Green Jackets, Devonshire and Dorset Light Infantry, Royal Gloucestershire, Berkshire and Wiltshire Light Infantry, Rifle Brigade, King's Royal Rifle Corps, 2nd King Edward VII's Own Gurkha Rifles (The Sirmoor Rifles), 6th Queen Elizabeth's Own Gurkha Rifles, 7th Duke of Edinburgh's Own Gurkha Rifles, 10th Princess Mary's Own Gurkha Rifles
- Black – All Royal Armoured Corps regiments in World War II (other than officers in Inns of Court Regiment), Royal Observer Corps, Westminster Dragoons
- Maroon – Glider Pilot Regiment and glider-borne units
- Green – Women's Royal Army Corps, women in Officers Training Corps, officers in Inns of Court Regiment
- Brown with a broad crimson headband and NO hat badge – 11th Hussars (PAO)

==== United States ====
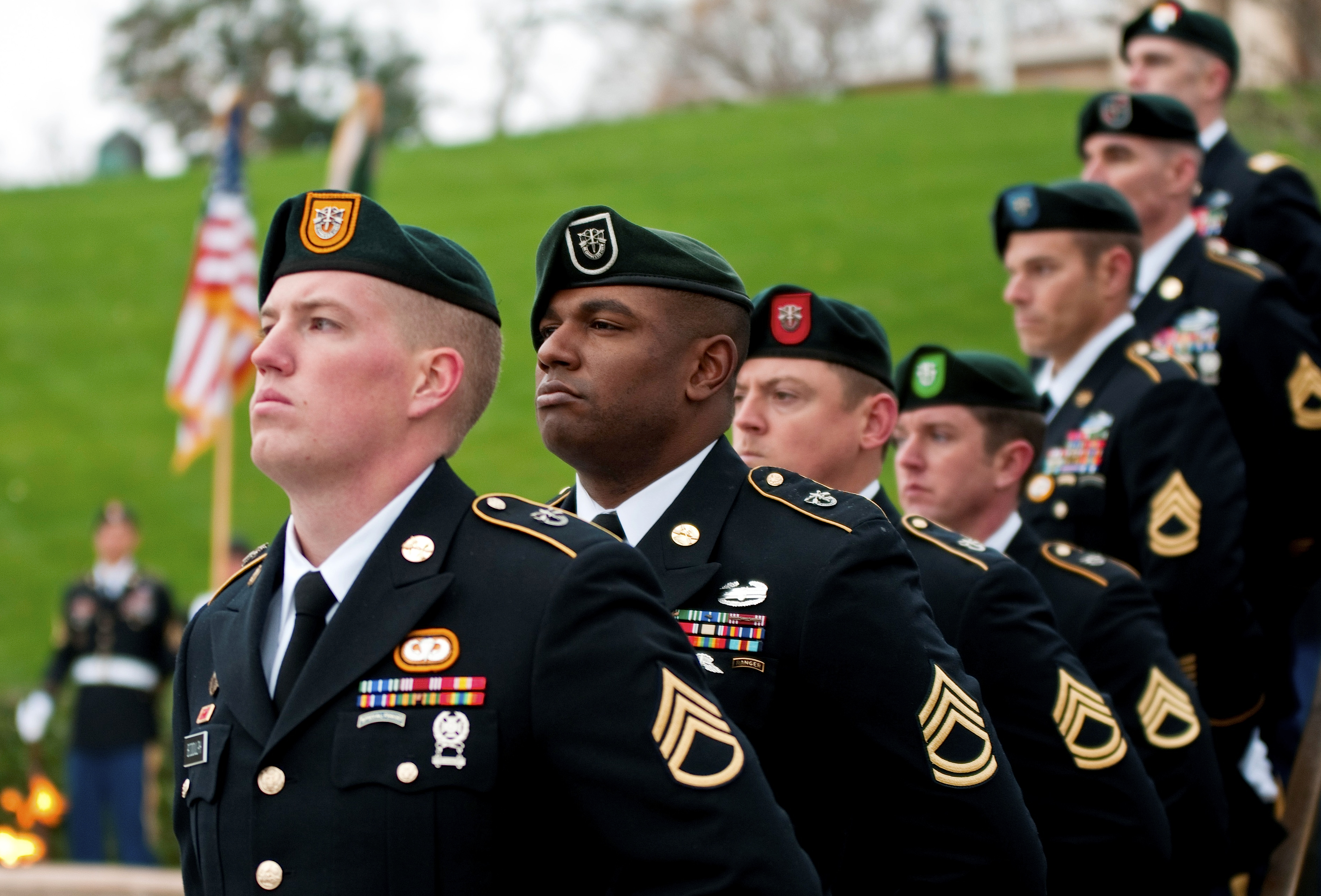
Army Special Forces soldiers wearing green berets at remembrance ceremony

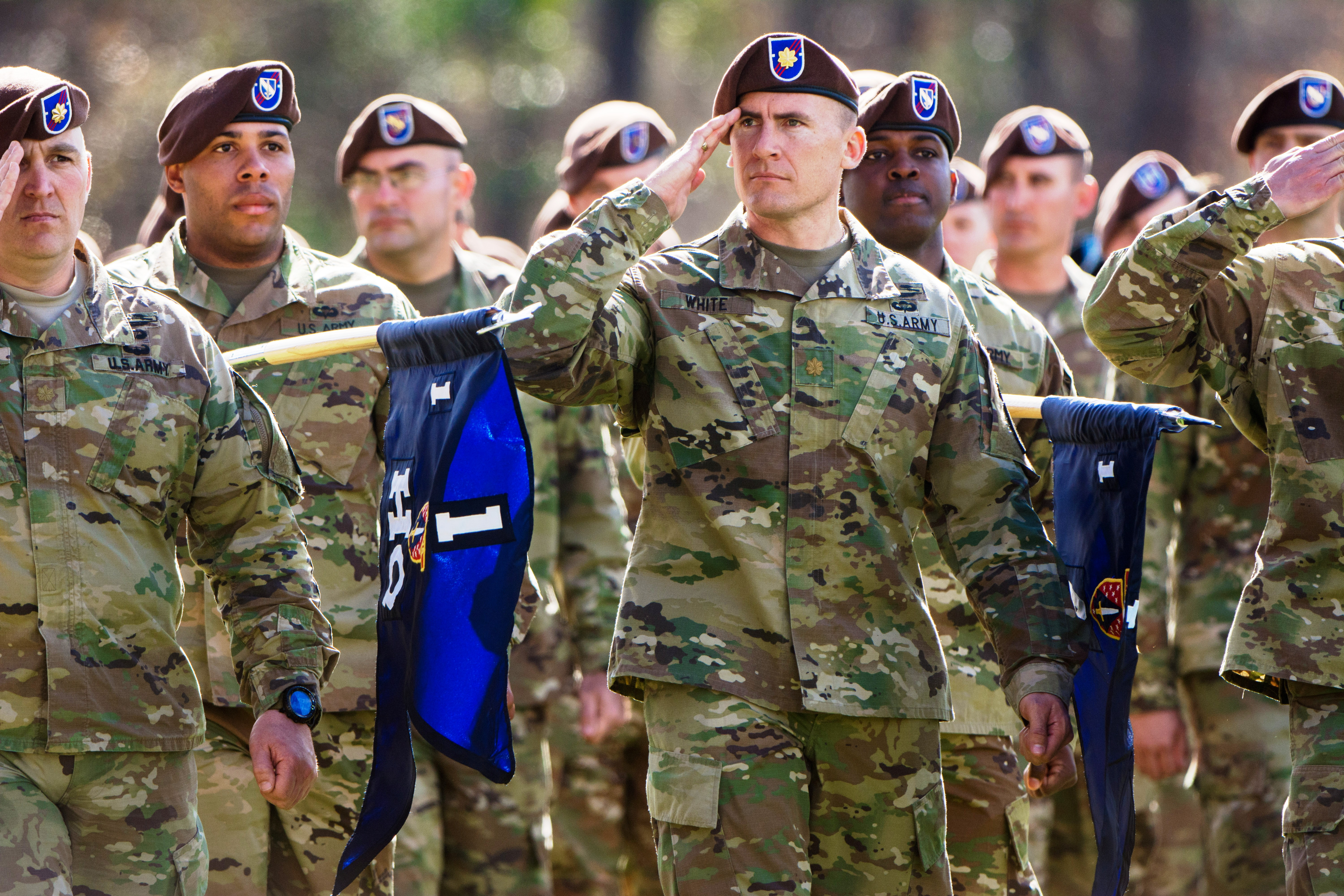
Army soldiers from the 1st Security Force Assistance Brigade wearing brown berets at activation ceremony

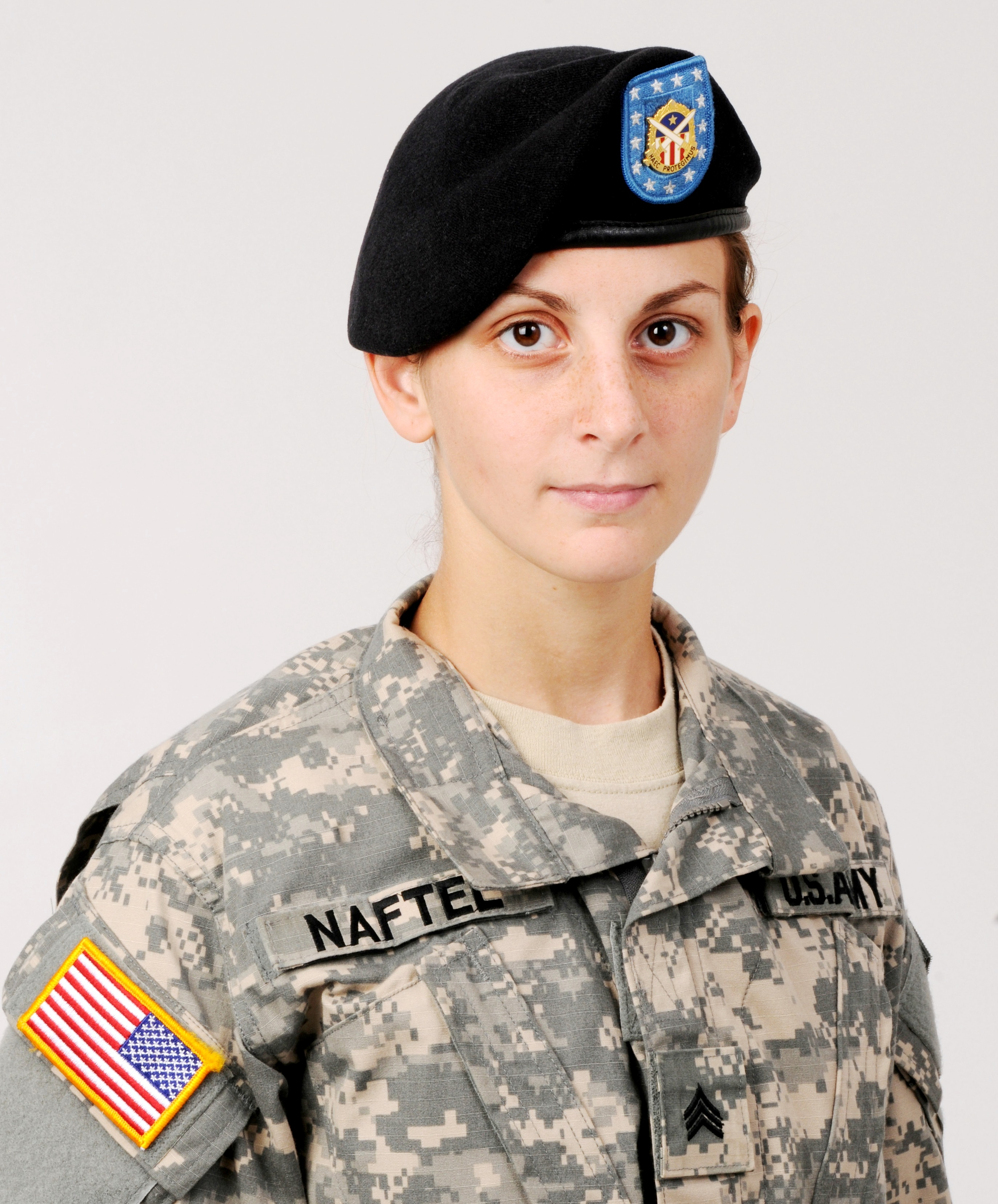
An Army NCO from the U.S. Army Military District of Washington wearing black beret

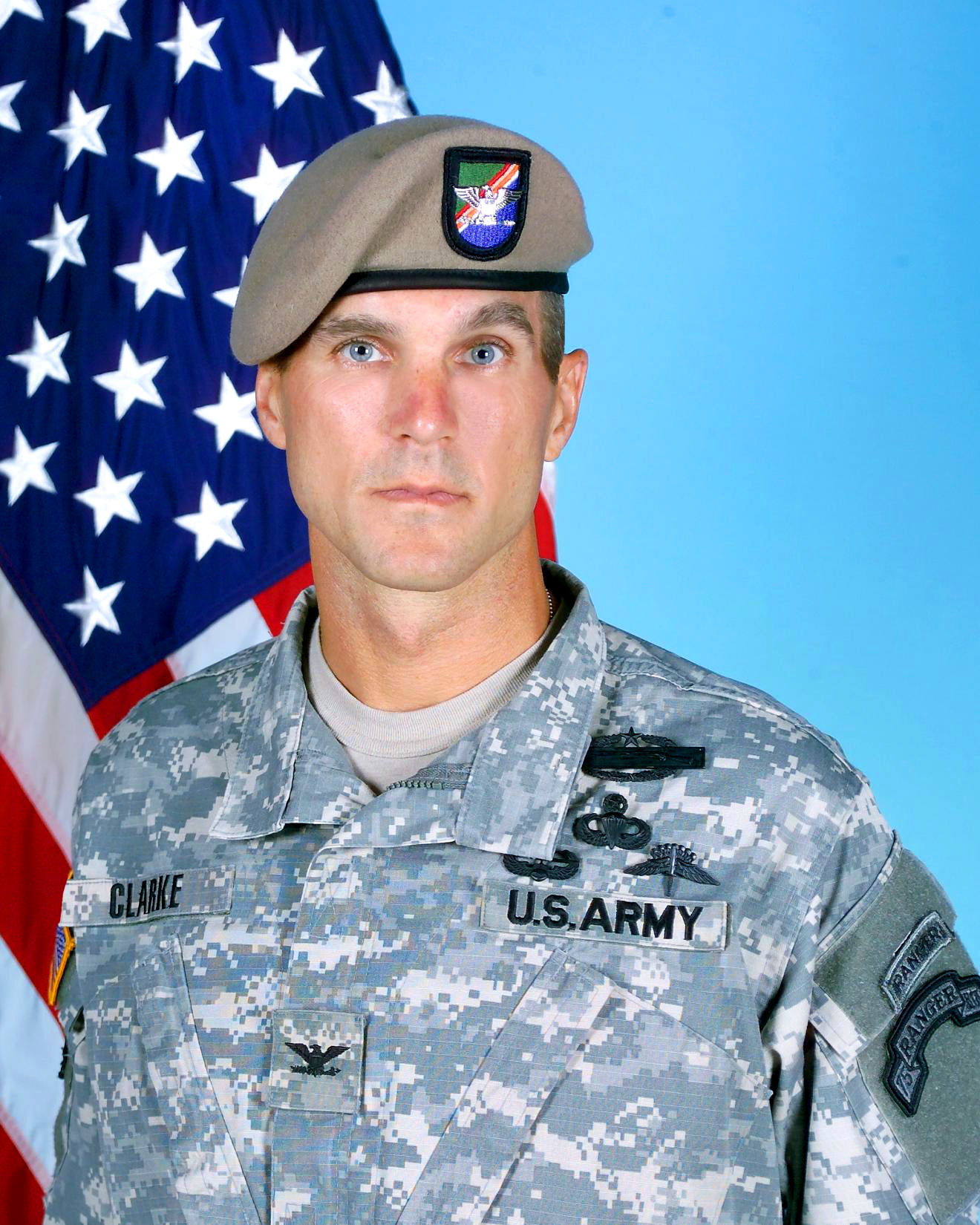
An Army officer from the 75th Ranger Regiment wearing tan beret

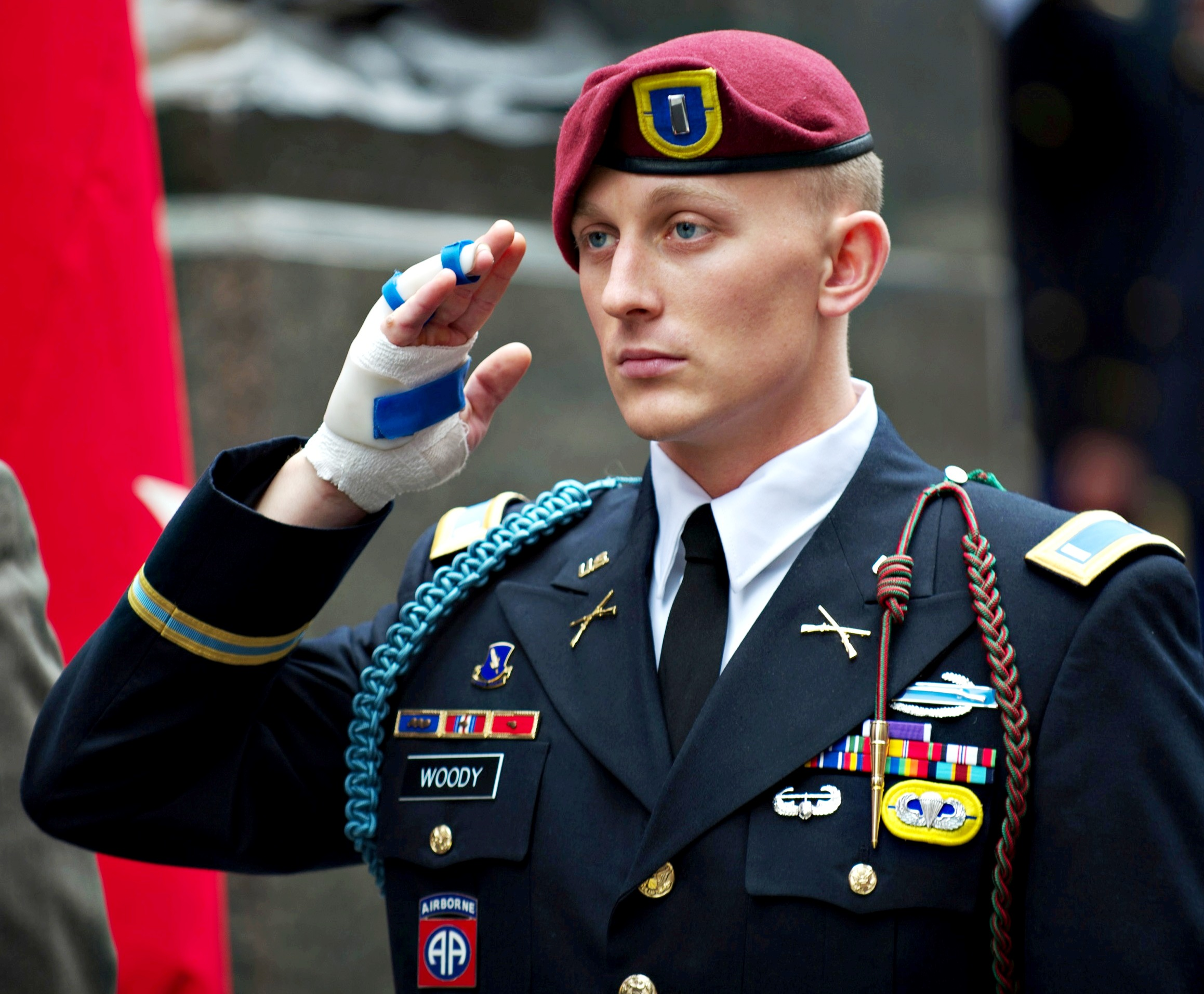
An Army officer from the 82nd Airborne Division wearing maroon beret at an Army Birthday celebration

Berets were originally worn by select forces in the United States Army. The first were worn during World War II, when a battalion of the 509th Parachute Infantry Regiment were presented maroon berets by their British counterparts. Though unofficial at first, the green beret of the US Army Special Forces was formally adopted in 1961. Maroon airborne and black US Army Ranger berets were formally authorized in the 1970s.

"D" Troop 17th Cavalry were authorized a maroon beret in Vietnam.

After the Vietnam War, morale in the US Army waned. In response, from 1973 through 1979 HQDA permitted local commanders to encourage morale-enhancing uniform distinctions; however, these distinctions were allowed to be worn only on the post. Consequently, many units embraced various colored berets, for example armor and armored cavalry units often adopted the black beret. Similarly many other units embraced various colored berets in an attempt to improve dwindling morale. In particular, the 1st Cavalry Division (United States) assigned various colored berets to its three-pronged TRICAP approach. In this implementation, armored cavalry, airmobile infantry units, air cavalry units, division artillery units, and division support units all wore different colored berets, including black, light blue, Kelly green, and red. The 101st Airborne Division was authorised a dark-blue beret.

In 1975 all female soldiers of the Women's Army Corps were authorized to wear a black beret variant as standard headgear for the service uniform.

In 1975 the 172nd Light Infantry Brigade at Fort Richardson and Fort Wainwright, Alaska, wore olive-drab berets.

In 2001, Army Chief of Staff Eric Shinseki ordered the black beret worn as standard headgear army-wide, a controversial decision because it was previously reserved for the rangers. The rangers were then authorized to wear a tan beret, exclusive to them. The decision was implemented in hopes of boosting morale among conventional units. However, many soldiers began complaining that the new black beret was not practical with the utility uniform. In June 2011, Army Secretary John McHugh, acting on the recommendations made by Chief of Staff Martin Dempsey and Sergeant Major of the Army Raymond F. Chandler, once again chose the traditional patrol cap to be worn with the utility uniform. The black beret may be authorized with utility uniforms at commander's discretion for special ceremonies. The beret remains part of the Army's dress uniform for all units.

In 2019, the army proposed the creation of a grey beret for USASOC soldiers qualified in Psychological operations, but it did not receive official approval.

US Army berets now use the following distinctive colors
Color	Wearer
Black	Worn by all soldiers with the Army Service Uniform as standard headgear (The patrol cap is the standard headgear with utility uniforms such as the ACUs; however, the black beret may be authorized with utility uniforms at commander discretions.)
Rifle green	Special-forces-qualified soldiers
Tan	Soldiers assigned to the 75th Ranger Regiment and the Airborne and Ranger Training Brigade (Soldiers that have served one consecutive year in the regiment and are assigned to a USASOC component may continue to wear the tan beret.)
Maroon	Soldiers assigned to airborne/parachute units
Brown	Soldiers assigned to the Security Force Assistance Command and its subordinate units
Dark grey	Army Junior Reserve Officers' Training Corps (AJROTC) cadets

Special forces, ranger, and airborne unit berets sport distinctive organizational flashes. All other units use a standard pale blue flash bordered with 13 white stars. Officers wear their rank insignia within the flash, while enlisted ranks wear their distinctive unit insignia.

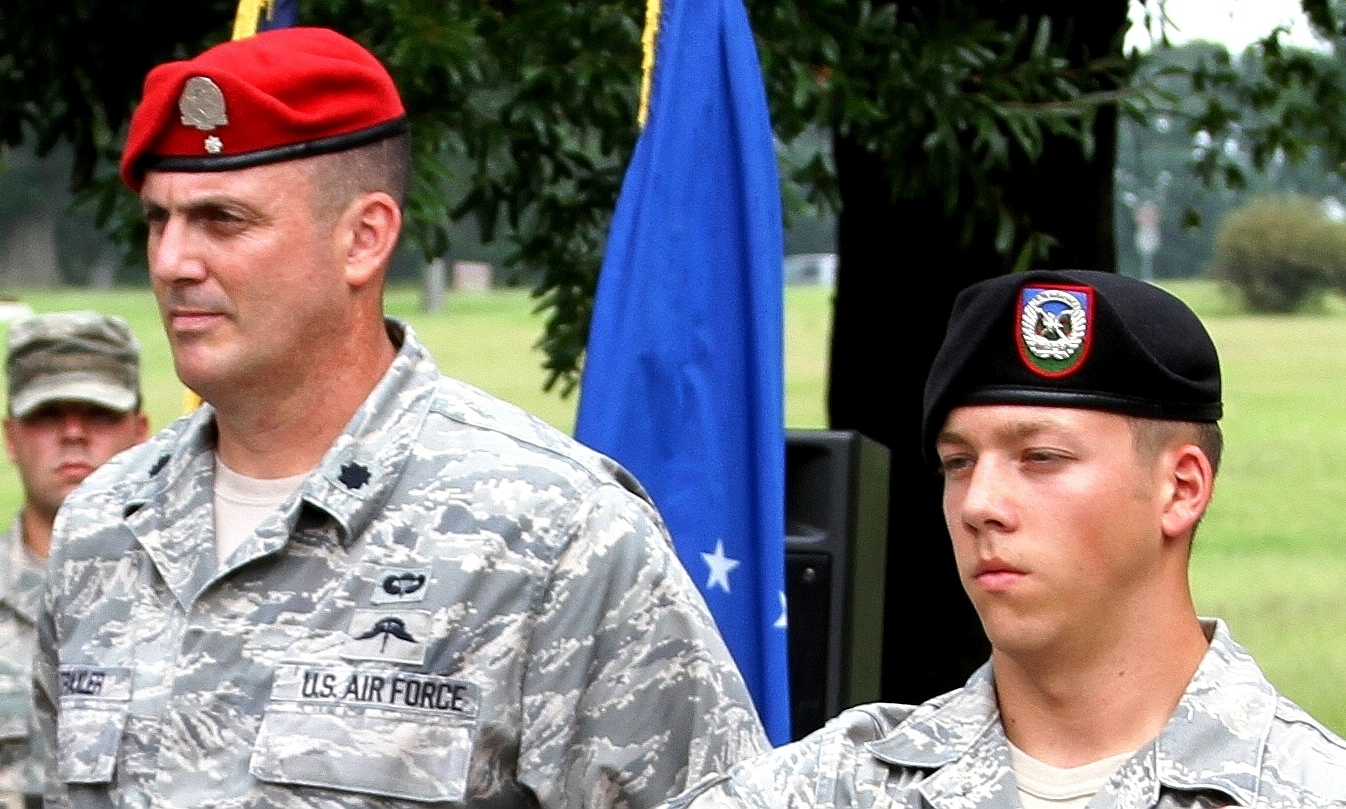
An Air Force special tactics officer and TACP NCO wearing their scarlet and black berets, respectively

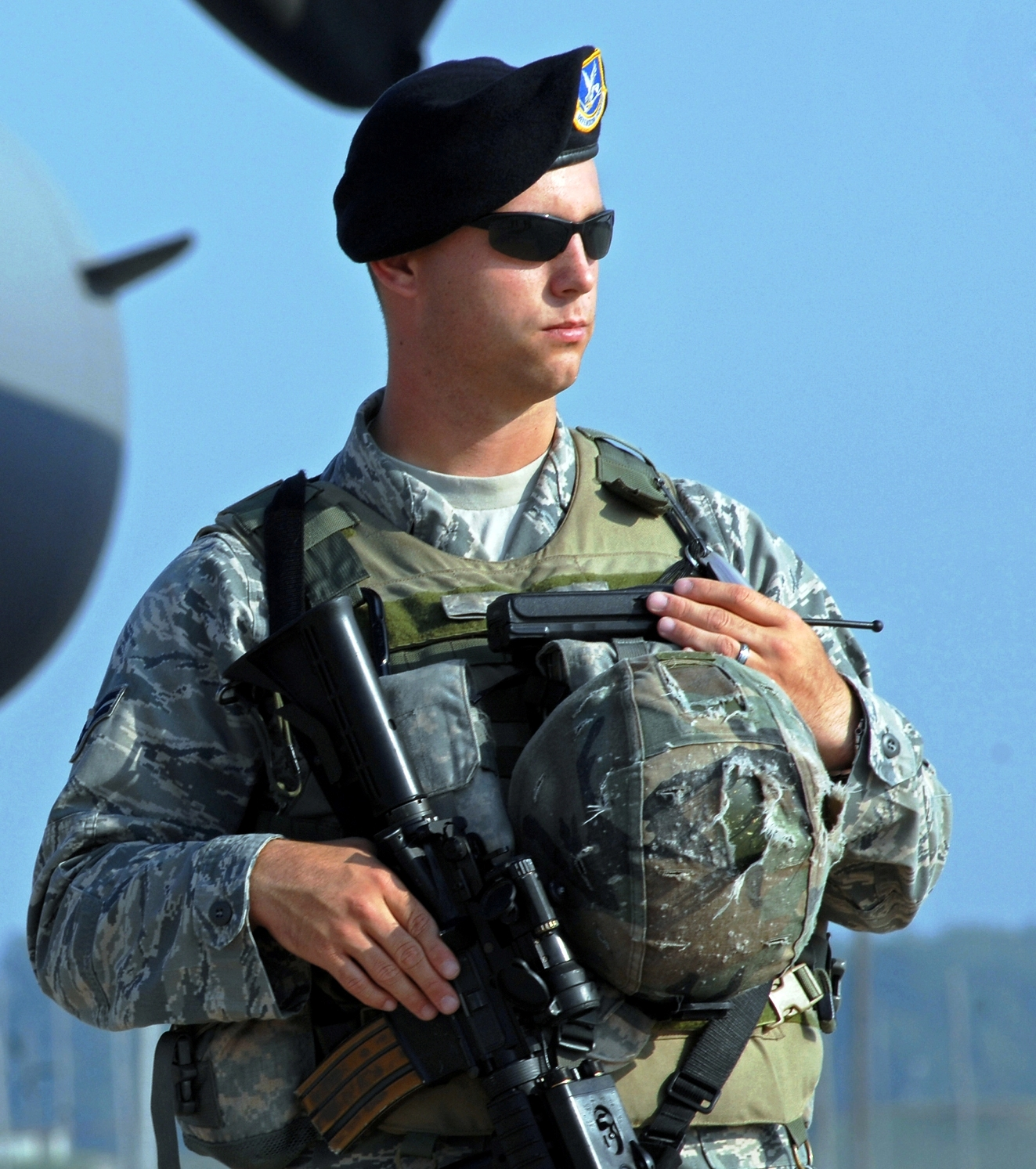
An Air Force Security Forces airman wearing dark-blue beret on guard

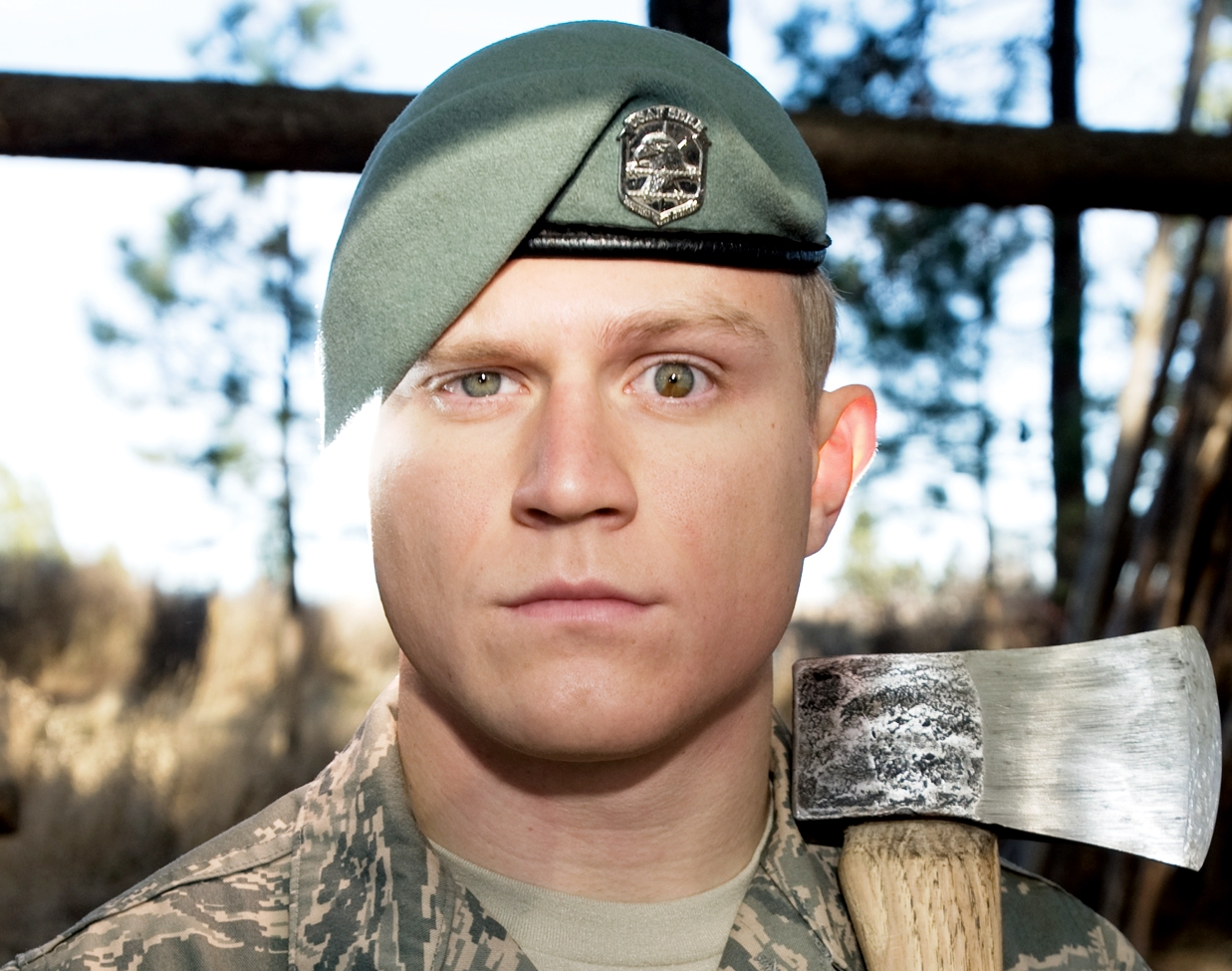
An Air Force SERE specialist wearing sage-green beret

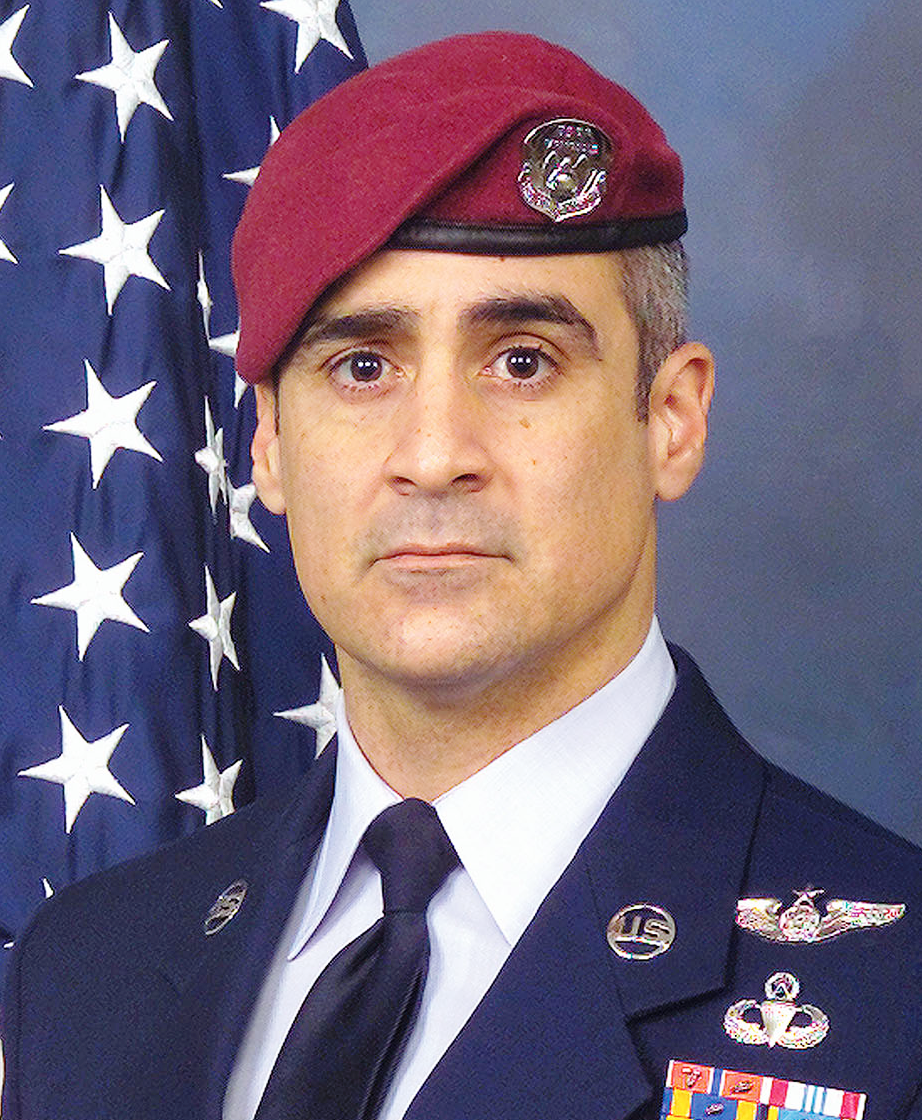
Then CMSgt Ramón Colón-López wearing maroon beret

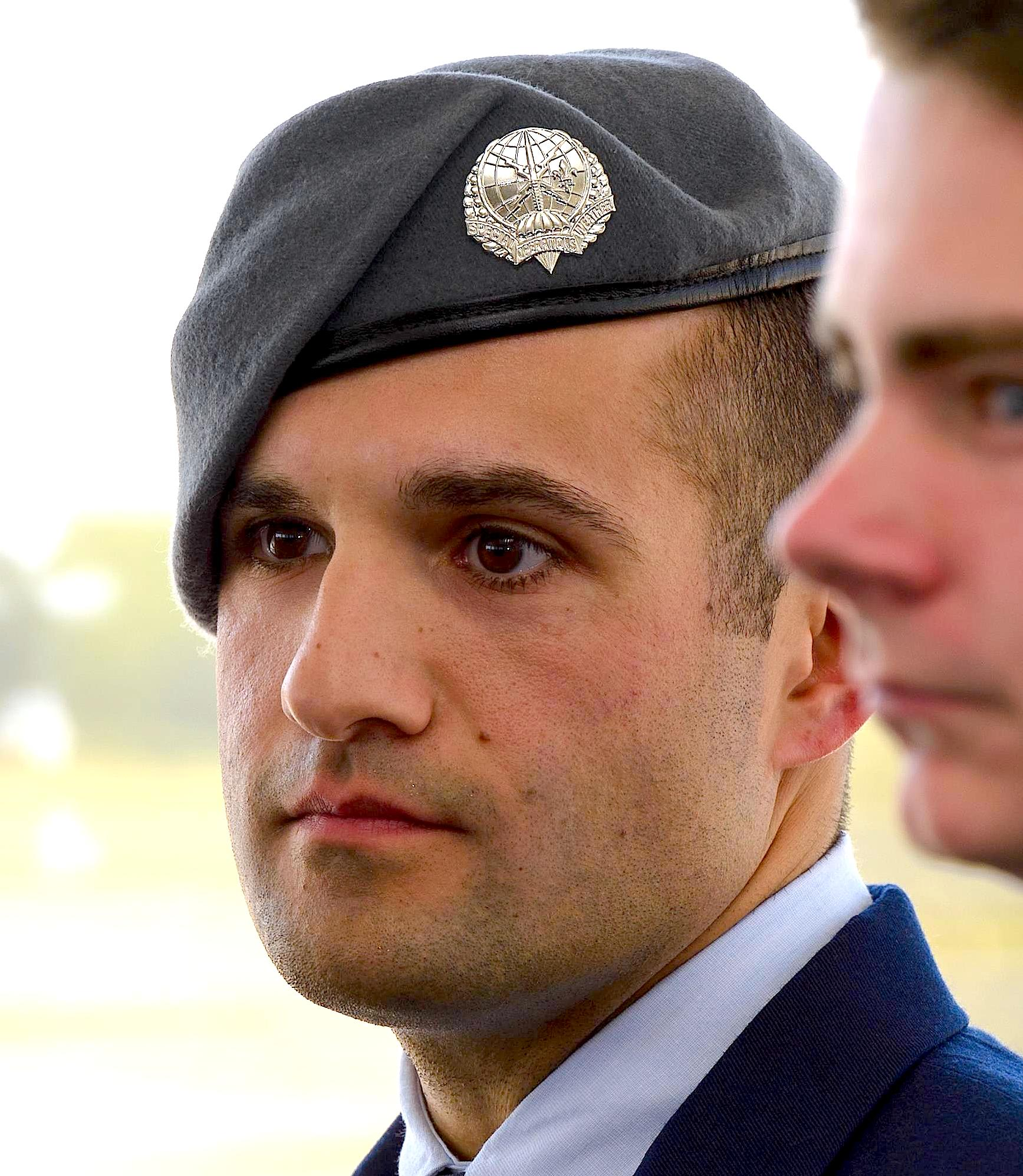
An Air Force SOWT—redesignated Special Reconnaissance—wearing grey beret

US Air Force berets use the following distinctive colors
Color	Wearer
Black	Airmen assigned to the Tactical Air Control Party (TACP), and Air Force JROTC cadets.
Maroon	Airmen qualified as pararescuemen and combat rescue officers
Scarlet	Airmen qualified as Combat controllers and special tactics officers
Pewter grey	Special reconnaissance and weather parachutist qualified airmen. Formerly CWT and SOWT.
Dark blue	Airmen assigned to the Security Forces, United States Air Force Academy first-class cadets, Basic Cadet Training cadre and second color for Air Force JROTC cadets.
Sage green	Airmen qualified as Survival, Evasion, Resistance and Escape (SERE) specialists
Rust	Explosive Ordinance Disposal qualified airmen
White	Third color for AFJROTC cadets

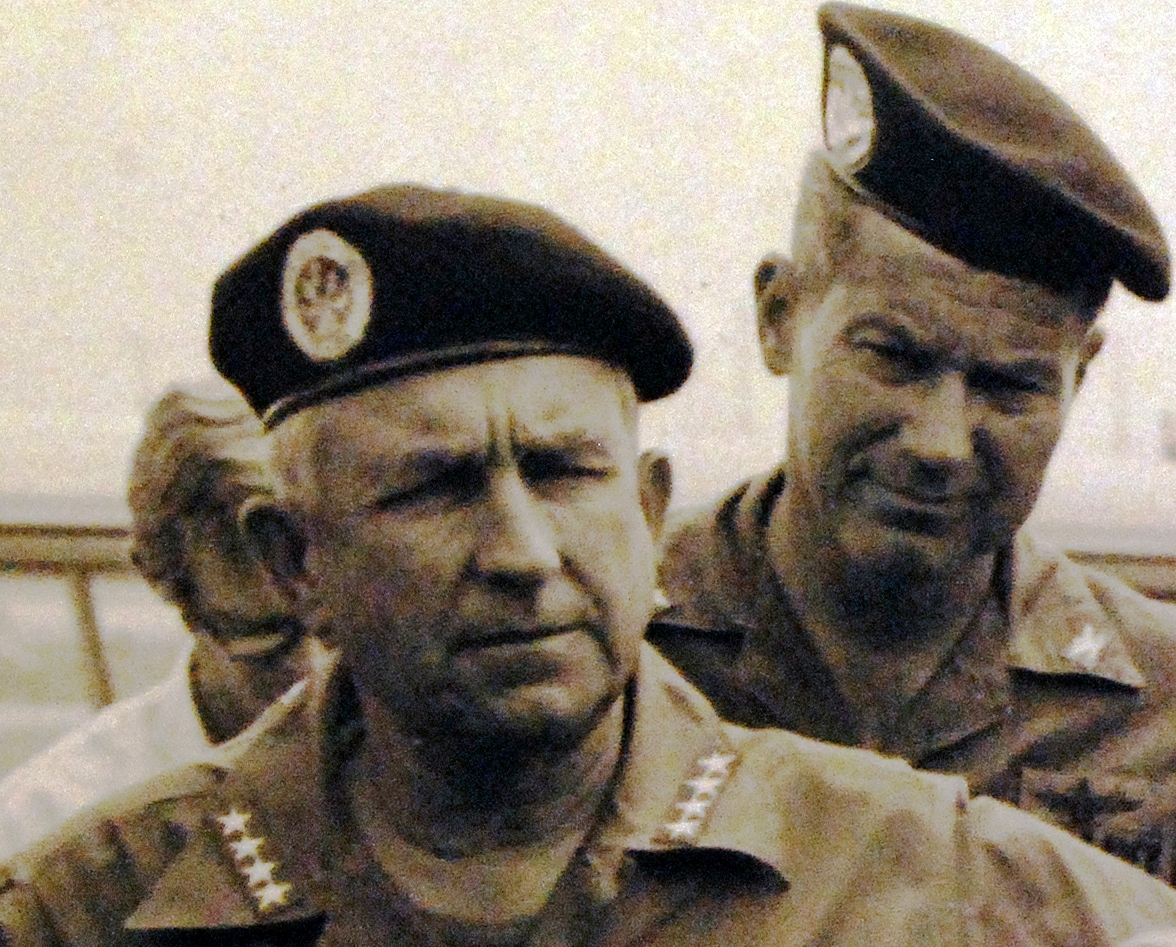
CNO and COMRIVPATFOR wearing black berets with River Patrol Force TF-116 patch (1969)

During the Vietnam War, the U.S. Navy created special boat teams, unofficially dubbed the brown-water navy, to patrol coastlines, estuaries and rivers. Naval personnel assigned to these teams wore black berets as part of their uniform, as portrayed in the movie Apocalypse Now. U.S. Navy SEAL teams serving in Vietnam wore camouflage berets in the field, the only beret somewhat standardized in the SEALs.

How the former female service uniform berets and cap devices were worn

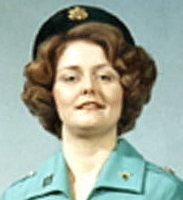
An Army officer wearing black female beret with Officer Cap Device (c. 1975)

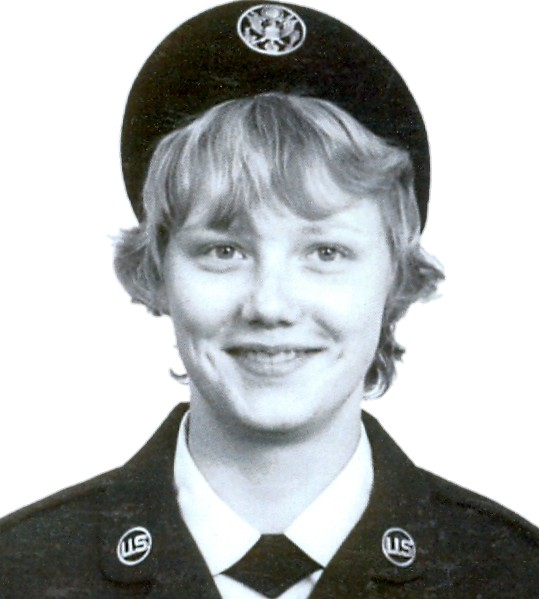
An airman wearing dark-blue female beret with Enlisted Cap Device centered with her face (1974)

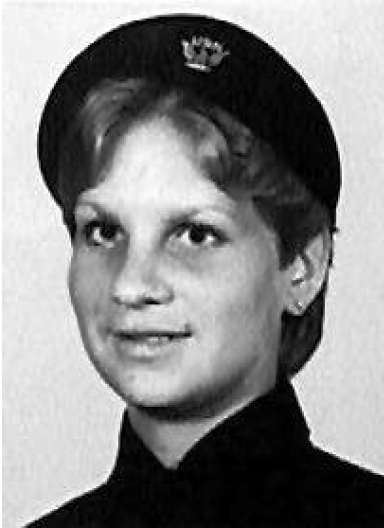
A sailor wearing black female beret with Enlisted Cap Device aligned over her left eye (c. 1998)

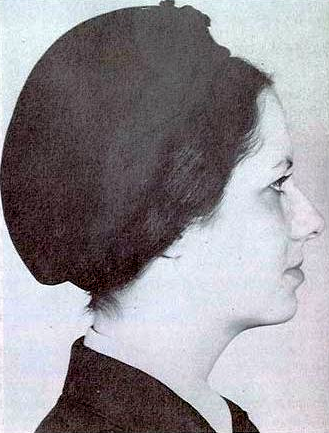
A Marine wearing dark-green female beret with subdued Enlisted Eagle, Globe, and Anchor Emblem (c. 1978)

Starting in the 1970s, a special female beret was authorized for wear as alternate headgear for the Army, Air Force, Navy, and Marine Corps with various service uniforms. The Navy was the last service to remove the female beret from their uniform regulations in 2015. These black (Army and Navy), dark-blue (Air Force), and dark-green (Marine Corps) female berets were of similar design and worn on the crown of the head. These service members wore their traditional cap devices on these female berets but unlike today's Army and Air Force beret flashes, these devices were worn center-forward on the beret with the exception being the Navy who wore their devices centered over the left eye.

=== V ===
==== Venezuela ====
Berets are worn by some units in the Venezuelan National Armed Forces, with distinctive colors for some units or functions. The beret colours are as follows:

Colour	Wearer
Venezuelan Army
Black	Venezuelan Army general issue berets; included, the comandos (Army special forces units).
Green	Army Counter-insurgency troops (caribes).
Red	311th Infantry Battalion "Simon Bolivar" (Army). Wears the red beret as the first and oldest active infantry battalion of the Army.
Red	42nd Airborne Brigade (Army).
Dark blue	Army Headquarters and Security Group (Lieutenant General Daniel Florencio O'Leary Headquarters Battalion).
Venezuelan Navy
Black	Venezuelan Marine Corps general issue berets (since 2009).
Venezuelan Air Force
Blue	Venezuelan Air Force Infantry units (Infantería Aérea) and Air Force Police personnel.
Black	20nd Special Forces Group (since 2016).
Venezuelan National Guard
Maroon	Venezuelan National Guard general issue berets.
Berets in inter-service units
Red	Presidential Honor Guard Brigade (armed forces joint unit).
Red	Armed Forces General Headquarters (Minister Of Defence troops (Caracas Battalion), armed forces joint unit).

Note: Before the conversion to the red berets, the Caracas Battalion wore dark blue berets similar to those used by the O'Leary Battalion.

Note: Bolivarian National Police general issue red berets (since 2017).

== International forces ==
=== African Union ===
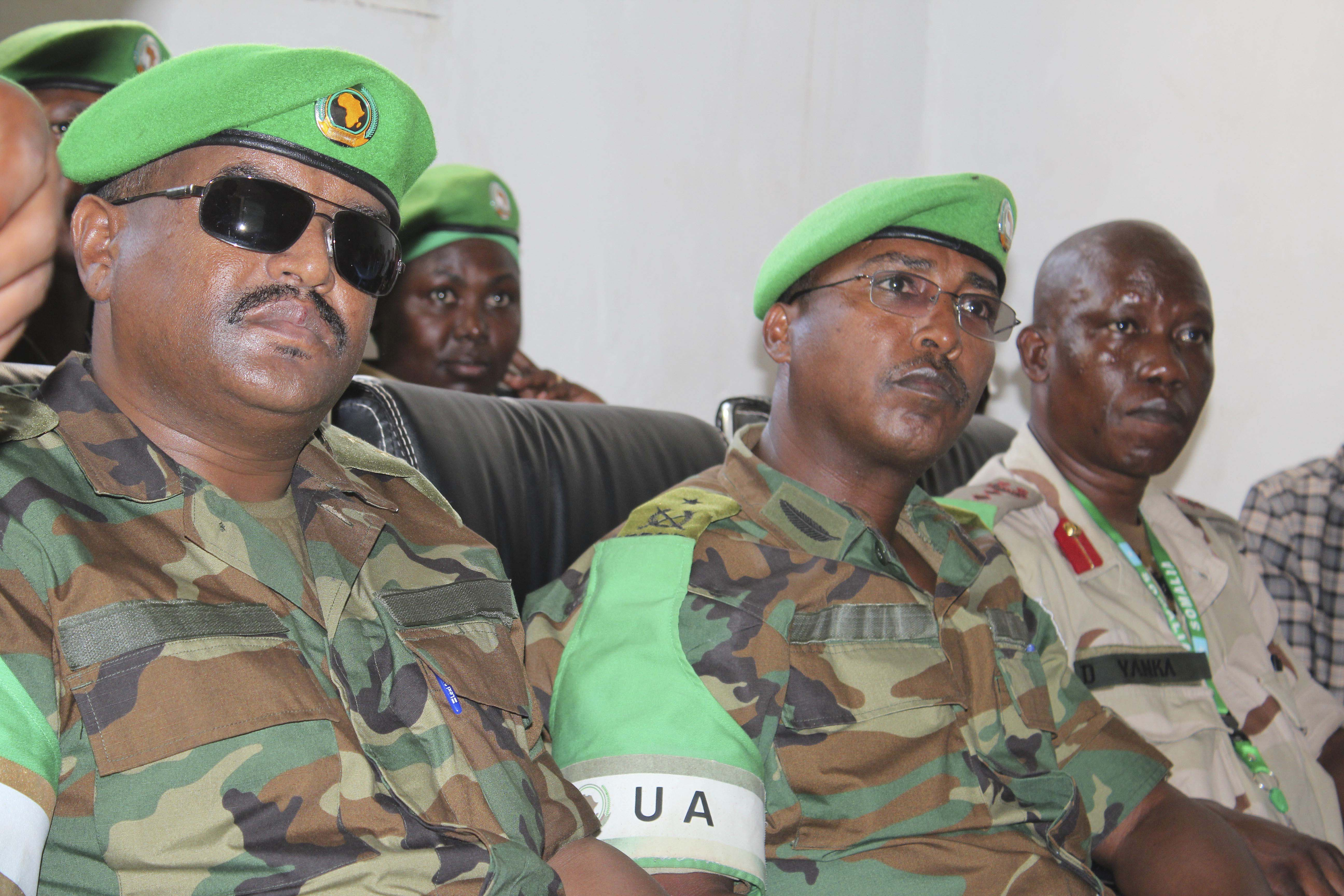
Officers wearing the African Union beret

Colour	Wearer
Green	Military personnel of any country serving with the African Union peacekeeping forces. AU forces in Mali and Darfur have since been turned over to UN administration and swapped their berets for UN light blue ones.

=== European Gendarmerie Force ===
Polish officer serving in an EUROGENDFOR beret

Colour	Wearer
Medium blue	Military personnel of any European country serving with the European Gendarmerie Force.

=== Multinational Force and Observers ===
A Canadian Army officer and U.S. Army soldier wearing the MFO beret

Colour	Wearer
Terracotta	Military personnel of any country serving with the Multinational Force and Observers wear a terracotta-colored beret or bush hat in lieu of their normal headgear.

=== NATO Multinational Corps Northeast ===
Multinational Corps Northeast

Colour	Wearer
Navy blue	Military personnel of any country serving with the Multinational Corps Northeast forces of NATO.

=== United Nations ===
Bangladesh officer (Major Tasawar) wearing UN blue beret

Colour	Wearer
UN blue	Military personnel of any country serving with the United Nations peacekeeping forces.

== See also ==
- Uniform beret, for the use of berets as uniform headgear outside the military

Military berets by color:

- Black beret
- Blue beret
- Green beret
- Maroon beret
- Red beret
- Tan beret
