= Red beret =

Military beret

The red beret is a military beret worn by many artillery, military police, paramilitary, commando, and police forces and should not be confused with the maroon beret worn by airborne troops all around the world.

== Artillery ==
Red berets are worn by the artillery units of Germany, Hungary, Switzerland and Ukraine.

== Military police ==
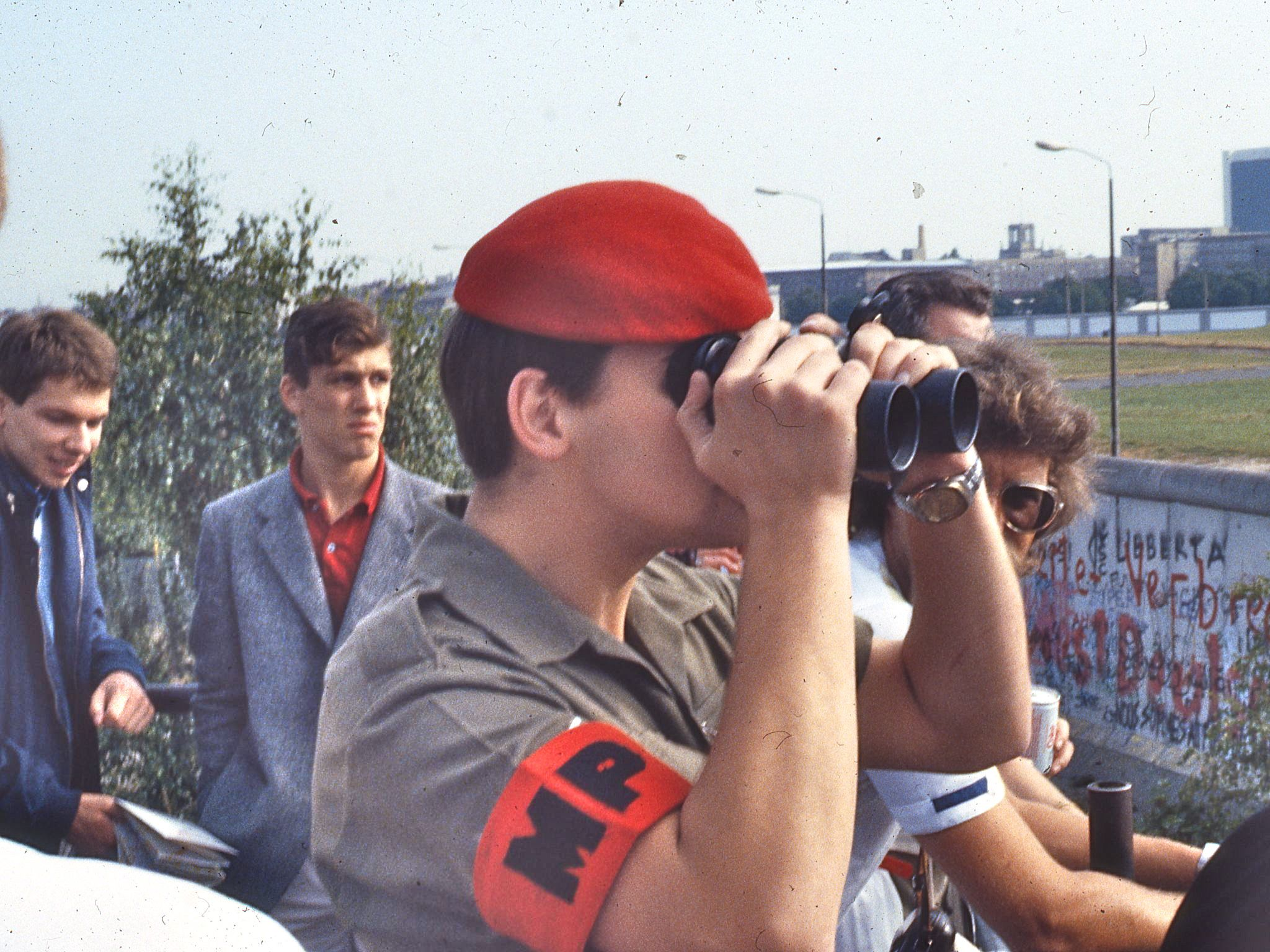
A member of the British Royal Military Police wearing a red beret near the Berlin Wall in 1984.

Scarlet berets are worn by the military police of many NATO and Commonwealth of Nations militaries.

- Military Police (Ukraine) – Ukrainian Military Law-Enforcement Service
- Military Police (Russia) - Russian Federation
- Royal Military Police – Provost branch of the British Army
- Royal Australian Corps of Military Police
- Corps of Military Police – India
- Sri Lanka Corps of Military Police
- Canadian Forces Military Police
- MH Katonai Rendészeti Központ (MH KRK) - Hungarian Defence Forces Military Police Center
- Feldjäger – Military Police of the German Bundeswehr
- Royal Military Police – Malaysian Military Police
- Póilíní Airm – Irish Military Police Corps (Ireland)
- Danish Military Police
- Military Police – Kuwait Army
- Namibian Defence Force Military Police
- Royal Military Police – Jordan Armed Forces
- Sõjaväepolitsei - Estonian Defence Forces
- Militārā policija - Latvian National Armed Forces
- Karo policija - Lithuanian Armed Forces
- Military Police - United Arab Emirates Army
- Military Police - Uganda People's Defence Force (UPDF)
- Żandarmeria wojskowa - Military Gendarmerie (Poland)

== Commando forces ==
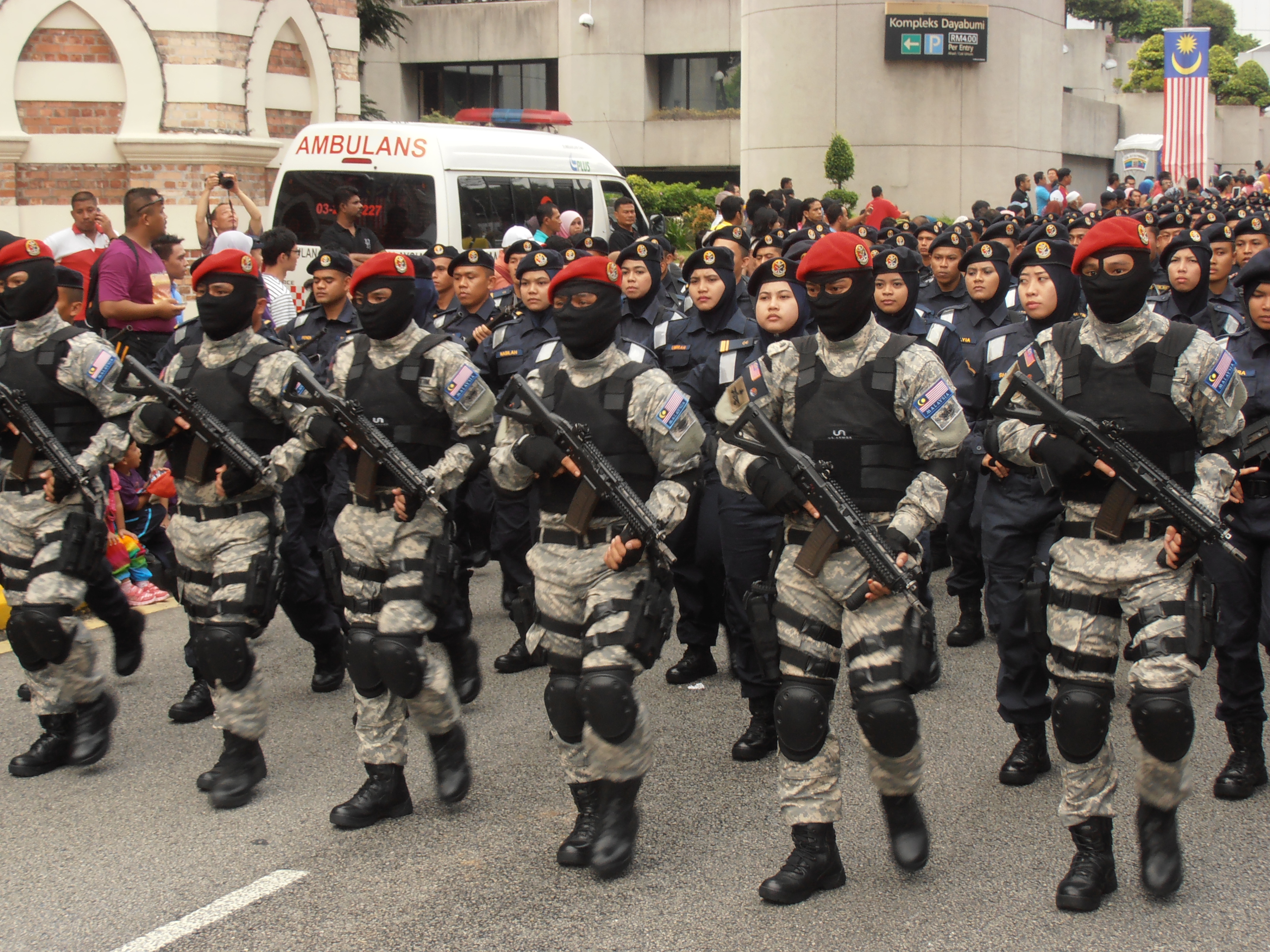
Malaysian Maritime STAR commandos with scarlet red coloured beret.

- Special Forces Command (Cambodia) – The Royal Cambodian Special Commando Force
- Angolan Armed Forces Commandos – guerrilla and counter-guerrilla special operations force
- Kopassus – Indonesian Army Special Forces Commandos
- KOPASKA – Indonesian Special Naval Frogmen Command
- Mozambique Special Forces (Commandos) – guerrilla and counter-guerrilla special operations force
- Portuguese Army Commandos – guerrilla and counter-guerrilla special operations force
- Special Brigade – Serbian Special Forces
- Lebanese Commando Regiment – Lebanese special forces regiment tasked with multiple roles
- Special Task and Rescue – Malaysian coast guard counter-terrorist special operations force
- Commando Parachute Group – French Commando Parachute Regiment
- Sri Lanka Army Commando Regiment – One of two Special Operations Forces of the Sri Lanka Army.
- 43rd Airborne Regiment – Airborne infantry regiment of the commando type of the Army of the Czech Republic
- 601st Special Forces Group – The most elite unit of the Czech army
- Commandos - Commando unit of the Singapore Army

== Paramilitary forces ==
- Special units of the Internal Troops of the Russian MVD
- JSO (Special Operations Unit) of Serbia
- Rhodesian Ministry of Internal Affairs (Intaf) in the Rhodesian Bush War
- General Service Unit (G.S.U.) of Kenya
- Ulster Resistance of Northern Ireland

== Other military units ==
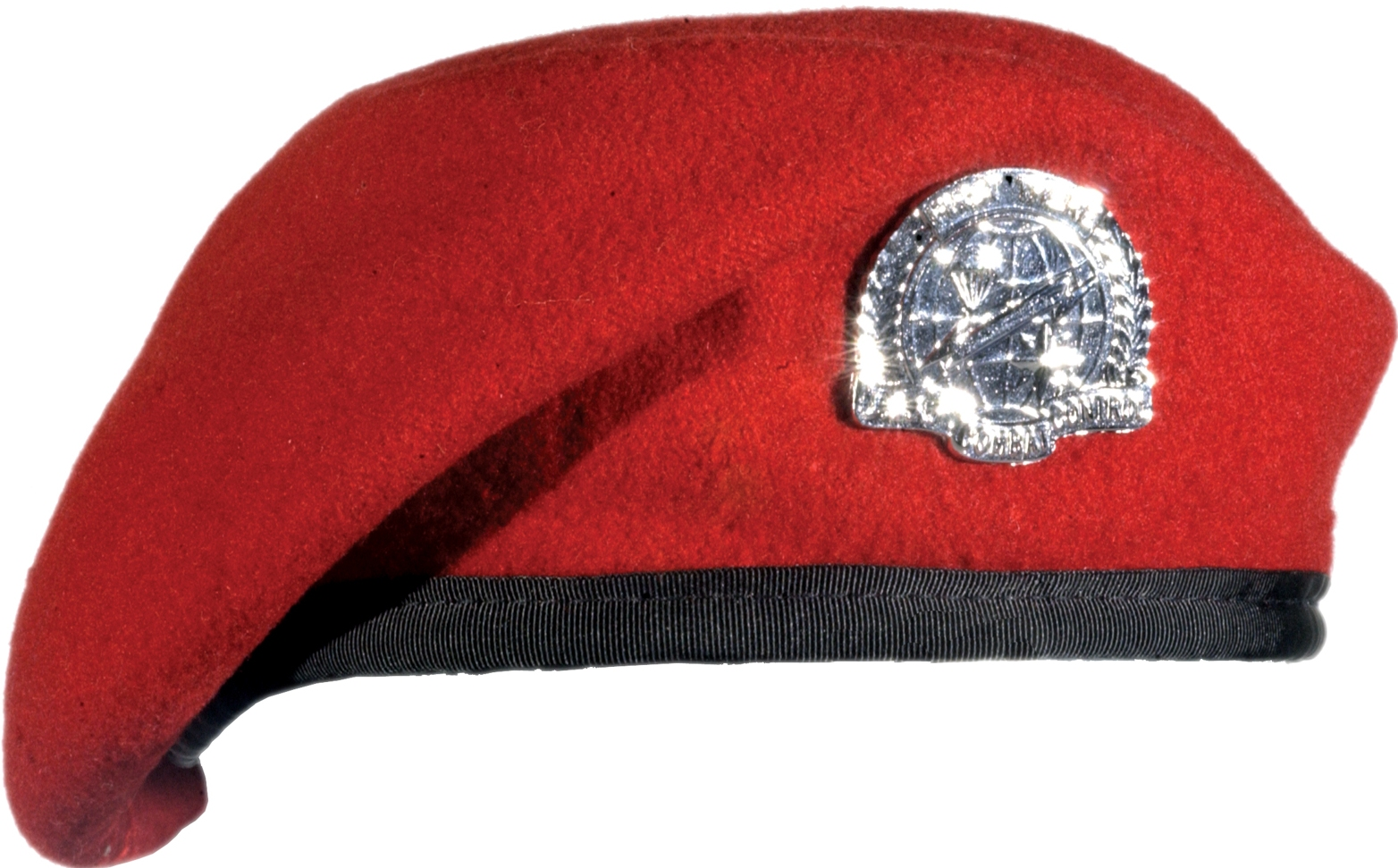
U.S. Air Force Combat Controller red beret

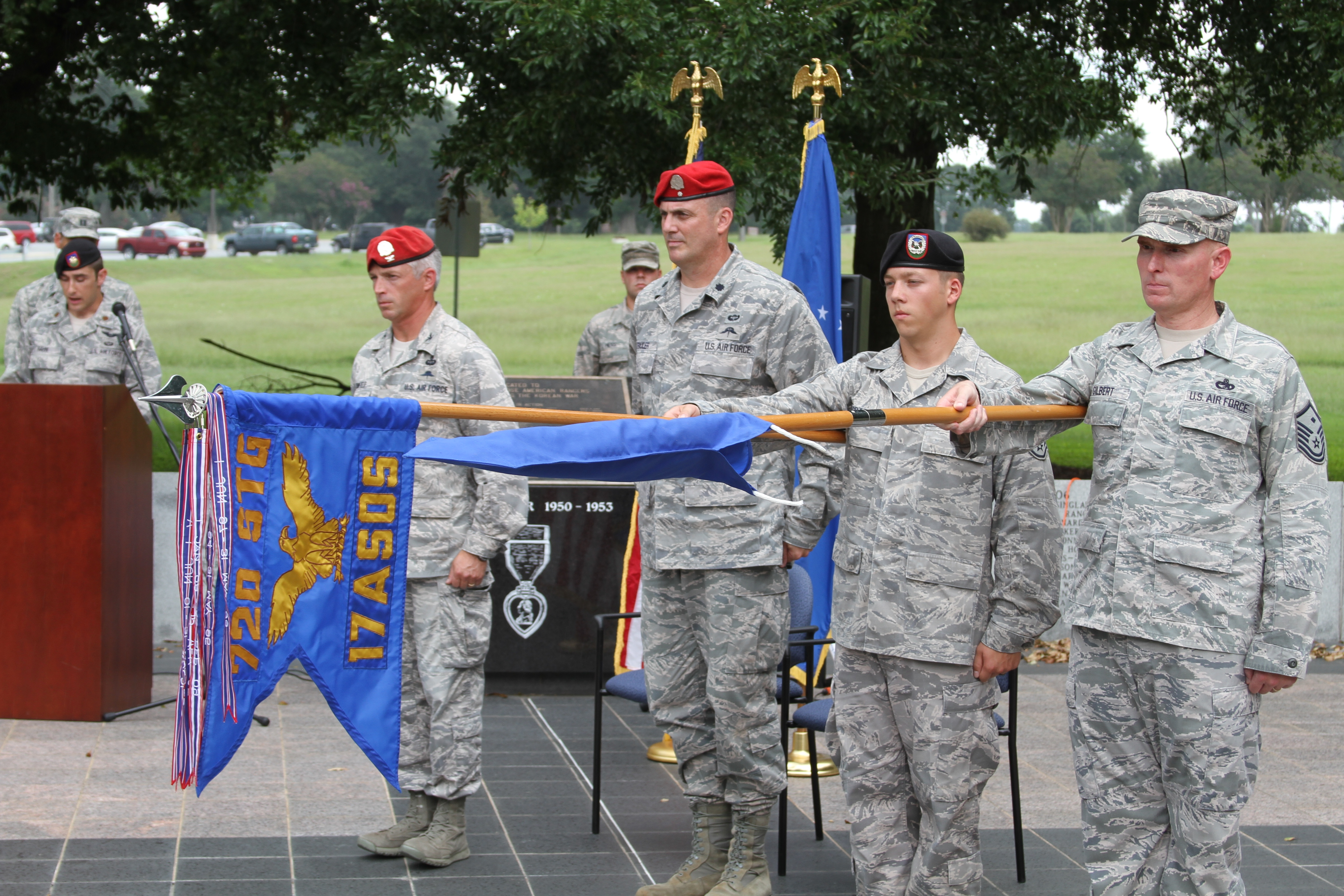
A U.S. Air Force Special Tactics Officer participating in a unit ceremony wearing his red beret

The following military units wear red berets:

- Parachute units of the Argentinean Army, including members not qualified as paratroopers.
- The Saudi Arabian National Guard.
- The Special Services Group of the Pakistan Army.
- Support troops in the German Bundeswehr (light red – called coral red, maroon only for airborne troops).
- Special Forces Battalion "Wolves" of North Macedonia.
- The Austrian Army Guard battalion.
- Turkish Army's special forces.
- United States Air Force Combat Controller.
- United States Air Force Special Tactics Officer.
- United States Army airborne units (including Special Forces units in the Army National Guard).
- United States Navy Flying Rifle Drill Team (Senior Drill Master only).
- Syrian Republican Guard.
- The 4th Rapid Deployment Brigade and 601st Special Forces Group of the Army of the Czech Republic.
- The Republican Guard in the Democratic Republic of the Congo.
- Swedish Armed Forces Music Corps.
- All Artillery units of the Swiss Armed Forces.
- Military Police, Artillery and Anti Aircraft Artillery of the Hungarian Defence Forces.
- The Parachute Riflemen Brigade of Mexico.

The following military units formerly wore red berets:

- The 1st and 2nd Canadian Infantry Battalions of the 27th Canadian Infantry Brigade in West Germany
- The Hastings and Prince Edward Regiment of Canada,
- The Vietnamese Airborne Division (Mũ Đỏ Nhảy Dù) of the Republic of Vietnam
- 40. Fallschirmjägerbataillon Willi Sänger of the former German Democratic Republic's Nationale Volksarmee.
- The 4th Guards Brigade (Croatia) (called "The Spiders", 'Pauci')

== Police forces ==
- Ertzaina – the Police force of the Basque Country
- Policía Foral – the Police force of Navarre
- Federal Reserve Unit of the Royal Malaysia Police
- Cacciatori of the Carabinieri – in English "Hunters", the Italian Gendarmerie special unit operating in Calabria
- Special Operations Command of the Singapore Police Force
- Dog unit of the Public Security Police, Portugal
- Berkut (special police force) – was the Ukrainian riot police (1992 – 2014)

== Carlists ==
The red beret was worn as a distinguishing device by Carlist Guías de Navarra (Navarre Guides) soldiers in the First Carlist War, encouraged by their commander Tomás de Zumalacárregui. Regular Carlists wore a black beret. The red beret became widespread amongst the Carlists in the Second Carlist War, it later became an emblem of Carlists in general, often with a yellow pom pom or tassel. See also the Requetés, (Spanish:Hunting callers) a type of volunteer unit during the Spanish Civil War.

The red beret was also worn by the Chapelgorris (Spanish:Red caps) who fought against the Carlists in the First Carlist War.

== Non-military ==
- SCTU (СОБТ / special counter terrorist unit), Bulgaria's elite counter-terrorism unit, reporting directly to the Minister of Interior
- Guardian Angels, international volunteer organization
- Cadets in the California Cadet Corps who have completed survival training are authorized to wear a red beret with a flash representing their brigade.
- Boy Scouts of America
- Cadets in the Young Army Cadets National Movement Russia
- ORB, a group within Doctor Steel's Army of Toy Soldiers fan club
- Soldier of Fortune magazine uses a red beret as their logo.
- The Economic Freedom Fighters, a South African political party, have adopted the red beret as one of their symbols.
- People Power, Our Power Political Pressure Group in Uganda led by Bobi Wine

== Native American Veteran Organizations ==
- The American Indian Movement, Native American Indians whom were former U.S. military veterans, have adopted the use of the red beret as one of their Native warrior society symbols back in 1970. The Red Beret is also in use by Native American warrior societies and tribal government police, Law Enforcement and by members and veterans of Native American organizations such as the TIMB Taino Indian Movement of Boriken (Puerto Rico).

== In popular culture ==
=== Films ===
- The Red Beret (1953)
- The Devil's Brigade (1968)
- The Red Berets (1968)
- The Wild Geese (1978)
- Taps (film) (1981) – worn by B Company, Valley Forge Military Academy and College treated as B Company of Bunker Hill Military Academy, led by Tom Cruise as Cadet Captain David Shawn in the film.

=== Comic books ===
- Mlle. Marie
- Fightin' 5
- Percy Pinkerton

=== Others ===
- Mirai Sentai Timeranger (2000–2001) – worn by Naoto Takizawa, played by Shinji Kasahara, as the leader of the City Guardians.
- Power Rangers Time Force (2001) – worn by Eric Myers, played by Daniel Southworth, as the leader of the Silver Guardians.
- Gundam Build Divers (2018) - the headpiece of the GH-001RB Grimoire Red Beret, piloted by Rommel.
- Worn by Cammy, a character from Capcom’s Street Fighter video game franchise.
- It’s Always Sunny In Philadelphia (2005) S3 E14 Mac and Dee parody the Guardian Angels uniform with their vigilante uniforms.

== See also ==
- Beret
- Black beret
- Blue beret
- Green beret
- Maroon (color)
- Maroon beret
- Military beret
- Tan beret
