= Nassolo =

Nassolo is a surname. Notable people with the surname include:

- Eugenia Nassolo (fl. from 2021), Ugandan entrepreneur, and politician
- Milly Nassolo (born 1993), Ugandan social entrepreneur, activist and lawyer
