= Eugenia Nassolo =

- Citizenship: Uganda
- Occupations: politician, entrepreneur
- Known for: Winning the 2026 Rubaga south race
- Title: Hon.
- Term: 2026-2031
- Predecessor: Aloysius Mukasa
- Political party: National Unity Platform

Eugenia Nassolo is a Ugandan entrepreneur, and politician who is the Member of Parliament elect for Rubaga South under the National Unity Platform in the 12th Parliament.

== Education ==
Around February 2023, Nassolo graduated with a Bachelor's degree in Community Psychology (BCPS) from Makerere University. Her Academic research included studies on stress, coping mechanisms and psychological well-being.

== Career ==
Nassolo is a member of parliament for Rubaga South Constituency in the 12th parliament representing the National Unity Platform. She defeated eight candidates in the same race with 35,366 votes. During preparations for the 2021 General elections, she was denied the National Unity Platform ticket which was instead given to Aloysious Mukasa. She later on stood as the flag bearer for the Democratic Party. However, she lost despite the backing of the Catholic Church and Buganda Kingdom. Furthermore, she petitioned the election results to high court but later withdrew the case.

== See also ==
- Justine Nameere
- Mastula Namatovu
- Shamim Nambassa
