= Obote Clement Kenneth =

Ugandan politician

Clement Kenneth Ongalo-Obote

Minister of State for Teso Affairs
- Incumbent
- Assumed office 2021
- President: Yoweri Museveni
- Constituency: Kalaki County

Member of the Parliament of Uganda for Kalaki County
- Incumbent
- Assumed office 2011

Personal details
- Born: November 20, 1971 (age 54) Uganda
- Citizenship: Ugandan
- Party: NRM
- Education: Colby College; Boston College Law School
- Occupation: Lawyer, politician
- Awards: Honorary degree, Colby College (2013)

Obote Clement Kenneth also known Clement Kenneth Ongalo-Obote (born 20 November 1971) is a Ugandan lawyer and politician who serves as the Member of Parliament for Kalaki County and as Minister of State in the Office of the Prime Minister, in charge of Teso Affairs, in Uganda's 2026–2031 Cabinet.

== Education ==
Ongalo-Obote attended Colby College, where he graduated in 1994, before enrolling at Boston College Law School, where he graduated in 1997.

== Career ==
Ongalo-Obote began his professional career with a fellowship with the Portfolio Committee on Justice in South Africa. In the 2006 general elections, he contested the Kalaki County parliamentary seat but was unsuccessful. He returned to contest the Kalaki County seat in the 2011 general elections and was elected to the Parliament of Uganda on the National Resistance Movement ticket.

He was re-elected as the Member of Parliament for Kalaki County in the 2016 general elections and served in the tenth Parliament from 2016 to 2021. During the tenth Parliament, he served as chairperson of the Committee on Rules, Privileges and Discipline, which investigated the conduct of Mityana Municipality MP Francis Zaake in relation to Makerere University Vice Chancellor Barnabas Nawangwe.

Ongalo-Obote continued to represent Kalaki County in the Eleventh Parliament (2021–2026) and served as Minister of State in the Office of the Prime Minister, in charge of Teso Affairs. He was also elected to the 12 Parliament to represent Kalaki County and was retained as Minister of State in the Office of the Prime Minister, in charge of Teso Affairs, for the 2026–2031 term.

== Awards ==
In 2013, Colby College awarded Ongalo-Obote an honorary degree in recognition of his achievements and public service.

== See also ==
- Eugenia Nassolo
- Shamim Malende
- Zahara Maala Luyirika
