= Kayanga Baroda Watongola =

Ugandan politician

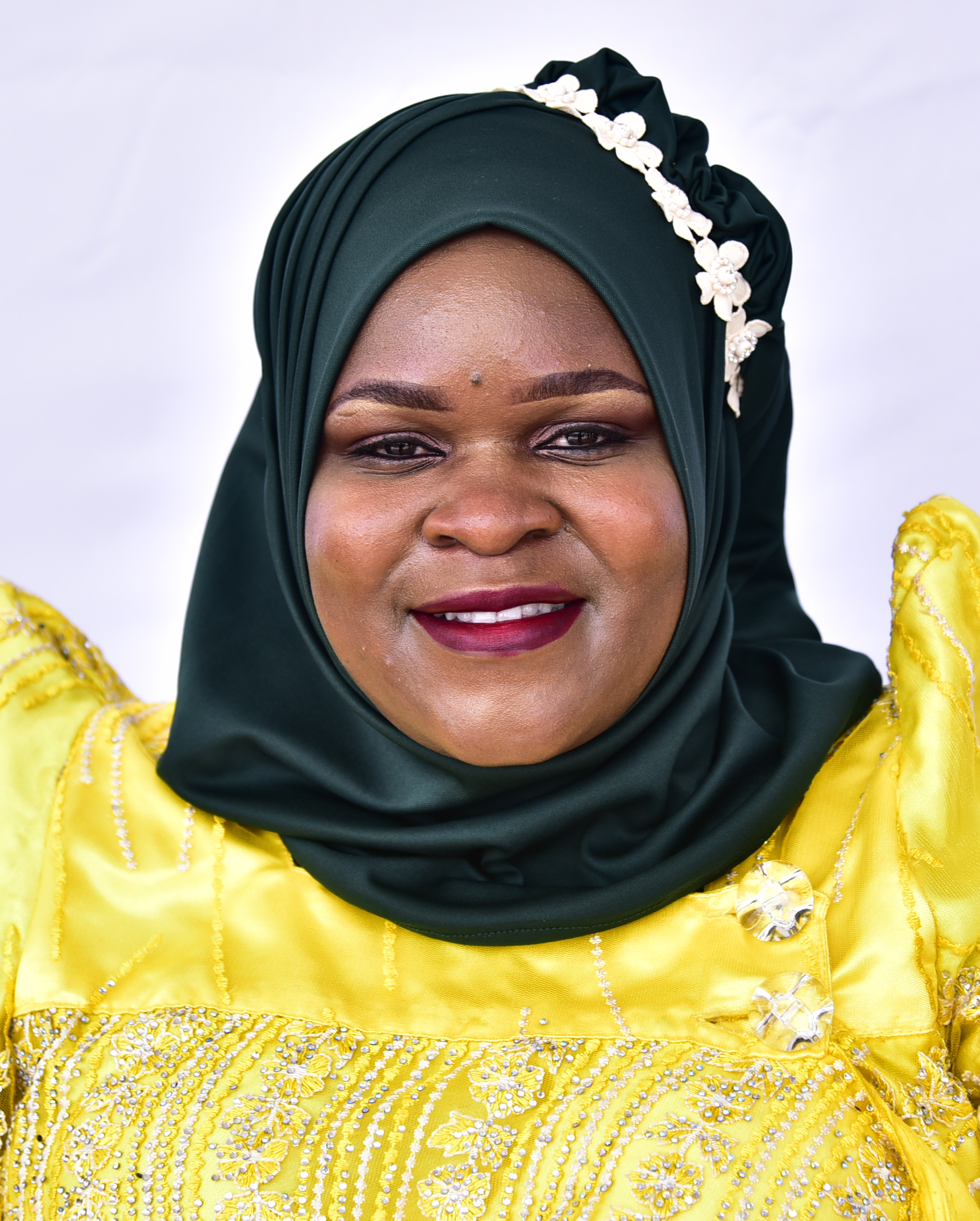

Member of the Parliament of Uganda
- Incumbent
- Assumed office 2021
- Preceded by: Rehema Watongola
- Constituency: Kamuli Municipality

Personal details
- Education: Kyambogo University

Kayanga Baroda Watongola is a Ugandan politician and legislator. She is the Member of Parliament for Kamuli Municipality, in the 11th Parliament of Uganda. She entered Parliament on an independent ticket.

== Background and Education ==
Baroda Watongola is the daughter of the late Hajjat Rehema Tiwuwe Watongola, the former Member of Parliament for Kamuli Municipality, and Badiru Watongola, the Kamuli Municipality National Resistance Movement (NRM) chairperson.

Baroda Watongola is an alumnus of Kyambogo University where she obtained a bachelor's degree in community-based rehabilitation. She also possesses a diploma in the same course.

== Career ==
Baroda replaced her mother as contender for the Kamuli Municipality seat in Kamuli District after her mother, Hajjat Rehema Watongola, died of COVID-19 a few months before the 2021 Uganda general election in which she had intended to participate.

She received an endorsement from the party president of Forum for Democratic Change (FDC), Eng. Patrick Oboi Amuriat, despite representing a different political inclination.

In the 2021 general election, Baroda sought the MP seat on an independent ticket, as her mother had. She won against Mastula Namatovu of the National Resistance Movement, Mosses Bigirwa of the National Unity Platform (NUP) and Eng. Geoffrey Mugoye (another independent).

In the 2026 general elections, she was beaten by her rival Mastula Namatovu in the toughly contested elections. She will therefore won't be seen the 12th parliament.
