= Maroon beret =

International symbol of airborne forces

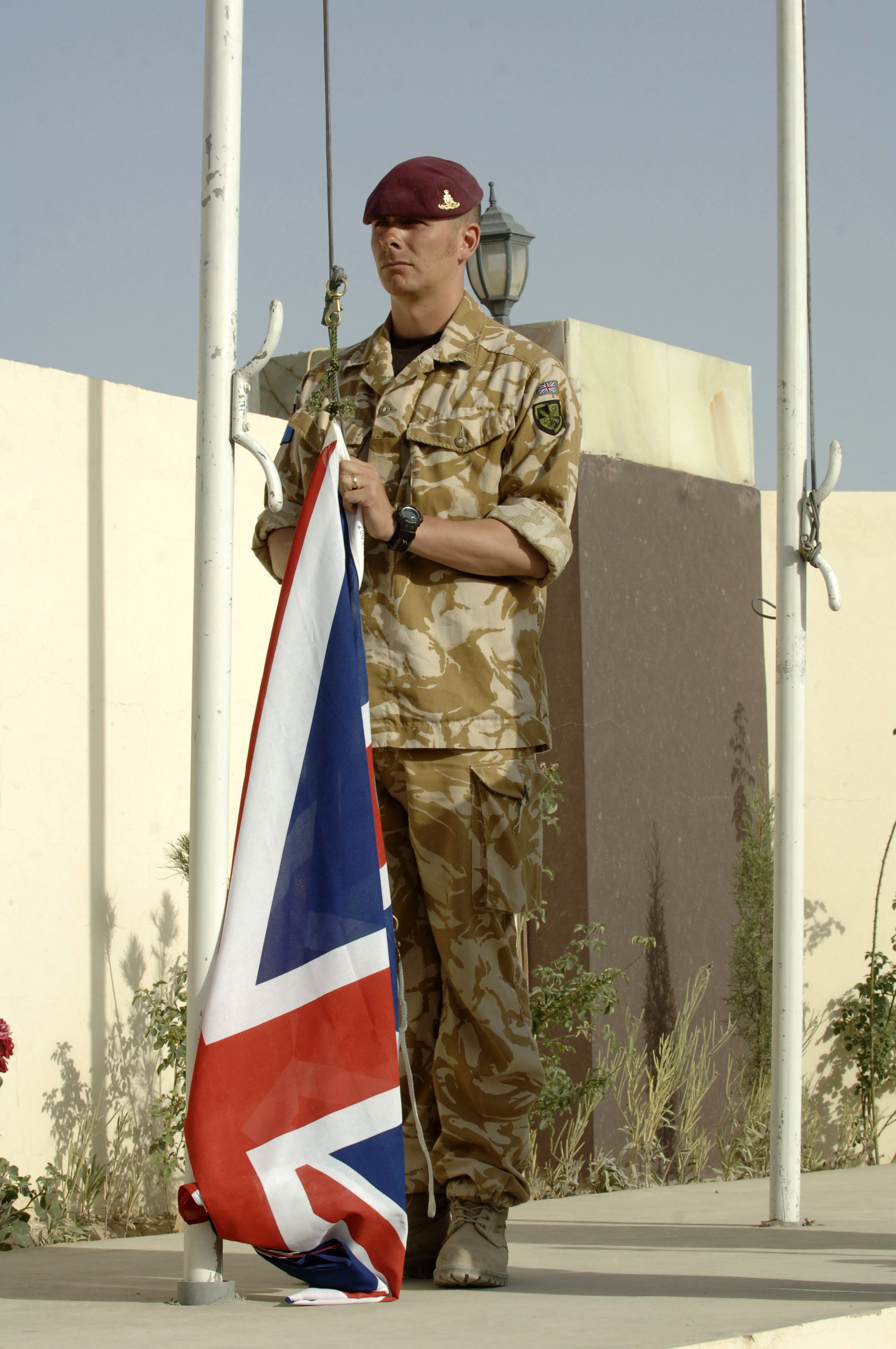
British soldier from 21 (Gibraltar 1779–83) Air Assault Battery RA (serving with 16 Air Assault Brigade)

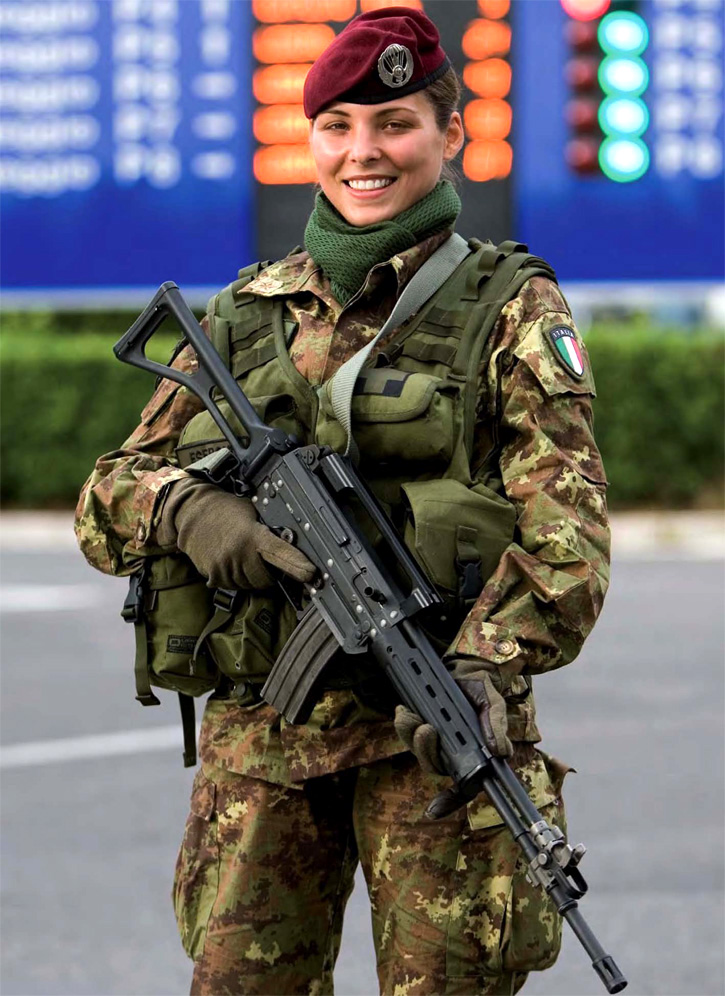
A soldier of Italy's Folgore Brigade

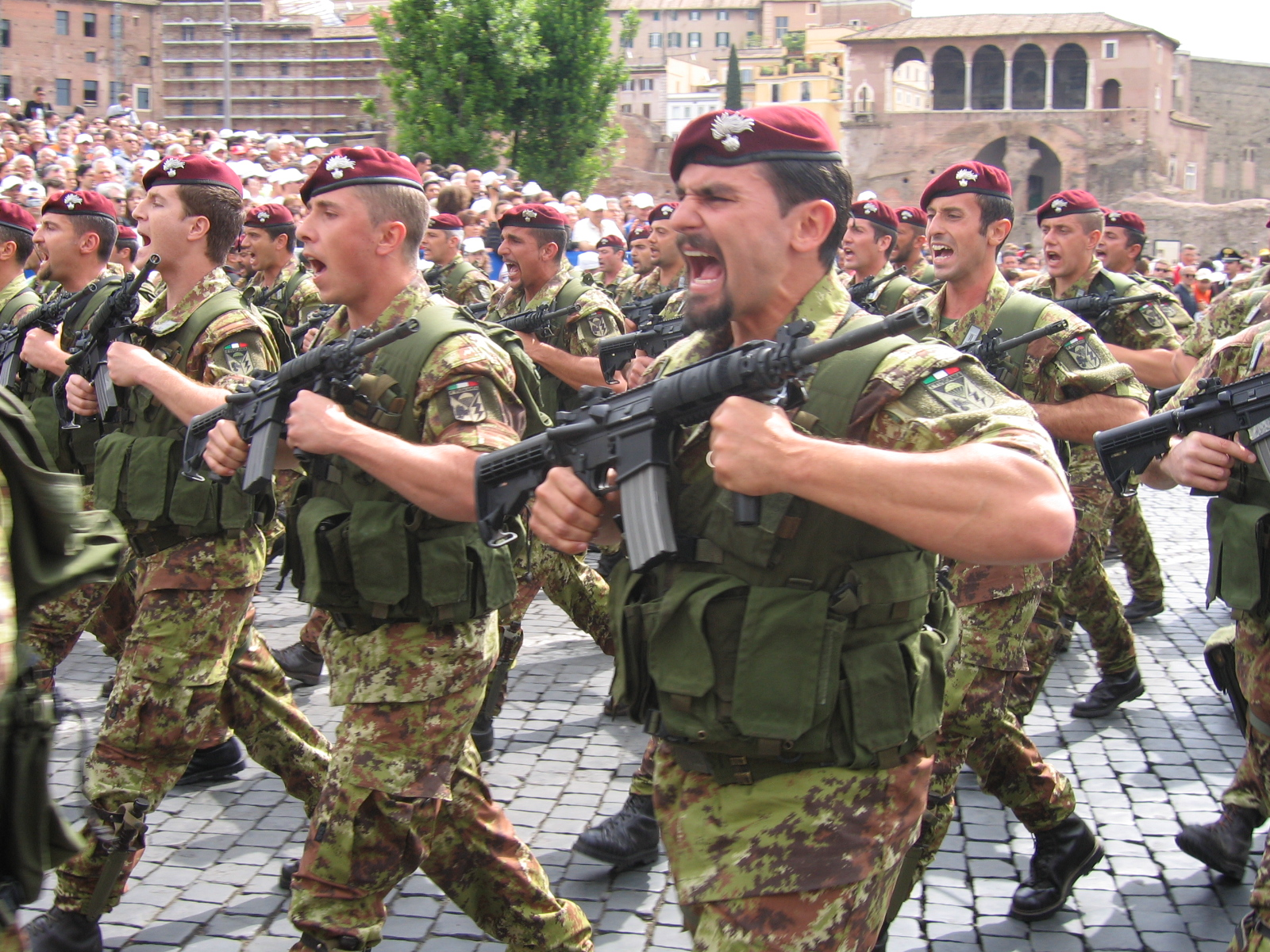
1st Paratroopers Carabinieri Regiment "Tuscania", also from Italy

The maroon beret in a military configuration has been an international symbol of airborne forces since the Second World War. It was first officially introduced by the British Army in 1942, at the direction of Major-General Frederick "Boy" Browning, commander of the British 1st Airborne Division. It was first worn by the Parachute Regiment in action in North Africa during November 1942.

== Origins ==
The first British army unit to adopt the beret was the Armoured Corps in 1924 (for more information see black beret). During World War II some British Army units followed the lead of the Armoured Corps and adopted the beret as a practical headgear, for soldiers who needed a hat that could be worn in confined areas, slept in and could be stowed in a small space when they wore steel helmets.

A popular story is that the maroon colour was chosen by Major-General Frederick Browning, after his wife, Daphne du Maurier, suggested that he use the colour which made up part of his horse racing colours. However, in a letter, now in the British Airborne Assault Archive, she wrote that it was untrue. Whatever its origin, the maroon beret was adopted by the British paratroopers in July 1942. Initially it was adorned with an Army Air Corps badge. This was replaced with the Parachute Regiment badge in 1943.

It was during the Western Desert Campaign (1940–1943) that the Germans in the Africa Korps began to refer to members of the British Parachute Brigade as Rote Teufel (Red Devils) after their maroon berets and their fighting skills.

== Afghan Armed Forces ==
The maroon beret was worn by members of the Afghan National Army Commando Corps. As early as 1970, members of the Afghan Commando Forces also wore a maroon beret during certain combat operations and military parades, signifying their para-commando status and differentiating them from the rest of the Afghan Army. The maroon beret has most commonly been sighted in use by the 37th Commando Brigade under the Democratic Republic of Afghanistan.

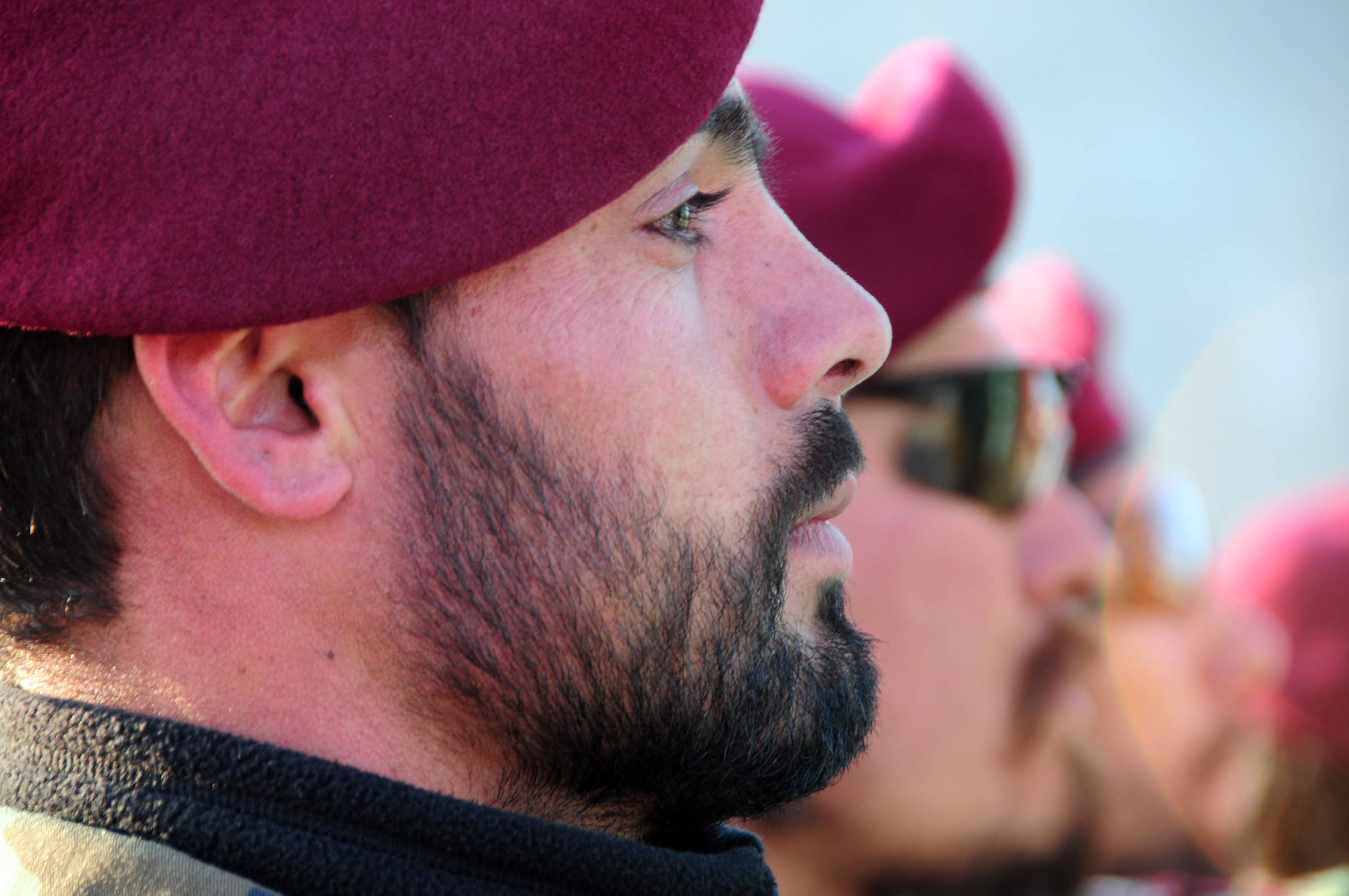
Afghan National Army commandos

== Austrian Armed Forces ==
The maroon beret is worn by all members of the 25th (Airborne) Infantry Battalion (Jägerbataillon 25) of the Austrian Armed Forces (Bundesheer), which is a mixed airborne/air assault unit.

The Special Forces group of the Austrian Armed Forces (Jagdkommando) also originally wore the maroon beret because of their airborne capability, but adopted an olive-green beret in 2003. In addition, the Austrian coat of arms is only used as cap badge until the successful completion of the basic selection course (Jagdkommandogrundkurs), after which Jagdkommando members wear a cloth version of the Kommandoabzeichen (="commando badge").

== Argentinean Armed Forces ==
Maroon berets are worn by member of the Armed Forces Operational Command and, in the Argentinean Army, by the 601st Air Assault Regiment. Paratroopers were red berets instead. Like all berets, its use is only authorized with the combat uniform.

== Armenian Armed Forces ==
Maroon berets are worn by the special forces branch of the Armenian Police, as well as by the Police Guard.

== Australian Army ==
Maroon (also referred to as Dull Cherry) berets were worn by parachute qualified members of the 3 RAR Parachute Battalion Group from 1985 – 2012, when the parachute role was performed by 3 RAR. In addition to the battalion, the Group included A Field Battery, Parachute Surgical Team, and Engineer and Signals elements. The beret was worn with the Royal Australian Regiment Badge by Infantrymen at the battalion, and individual Corps badges for other Corps members as appropriate. 2nd Commando Regiment now effectively perform the parachuting function formerly held by 3 RAR; they wear a Green Beret with a Commando Badge.

Qualified parachutists posted to Parachute Training School (PTS) wore the beret (or their Special Air Service or Commando Regt beret as appropriate) with individual Corps / Regimental Badges until a few years ago.

The beret is worn by any parachute rigger of RAAOC in a parachute rigger posting.

The beret was previously also worn by the Airborne Platoon Royal Australian Regiment 1951–1974, then the Australian Special Air Service Company (with the Royal Australian Infantry Corps Badge). When the Special Air Service Regiment was formed this was replaced by the tan beret (sometimes referred to as the sandy beret) with SASR Badge.

== Azerbaijan Army ==
The Republic of Azerbaijan special forces wear a maroon beret.

== Bangladesh Army ==
Maroon beret of Bangladesh Para-commando

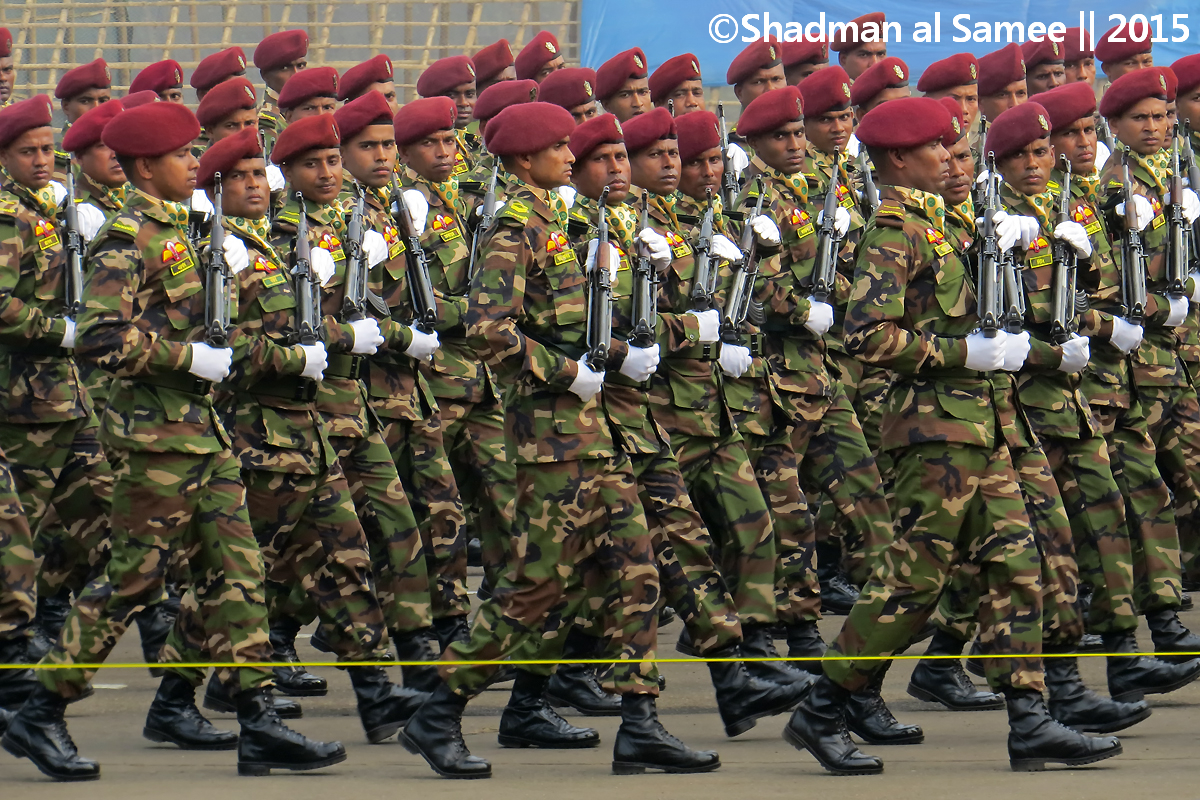
Bangladesh Army Para Commando troop at Victory Day Parade 2015

All members of the Bangladesh Army special forces 1st Para Commando Brigade Special Forces' battalions wear Maroon Berets with para commando cap badge. Besides all members of the Bangladesh Army Aviation Group, Army Medical Corps, Army Dental Corps and Armed Forces Nursing Services of Bangladesh Army wear Maroon Berets with respective cap badges. Besides, cadets of Mirzapur Cadet College, a military boarding school, are also entitled to wear maroon berets.

== Belgian Army ==
The Paracommando Brigade wear the maroon beret with various types of cap badges.

== Brazilian Army ==
In the Brazilian Army, the use of maroon berets and brown boots is restricted to the members of the Parachute Infantry Brigade (Brigada de Infantaria Paraquedista) one of the elite brigades of the Brazilian Armed Forces.

== British Army ==
British Army Regiments wear distinctive headdress and cap badges which often reflect regimental history.

Members of the Parachute Regiment and other arms serving in 16th Air Assault Brigade wear the maroon beret. A maroon beret does not mean the wearer is qualified as a military parachutist. Personnel qualified as military parachutists wear the Parachutist Badge. The beret is often called (within the Army) the "maroon machine".

== Brunei Armed Forces ==
The Special Forces Regiment (Malay: Regimen Pasukan Khas, "RPK") wear a maroon beret.

== Burkina Faso Armed Forces ==
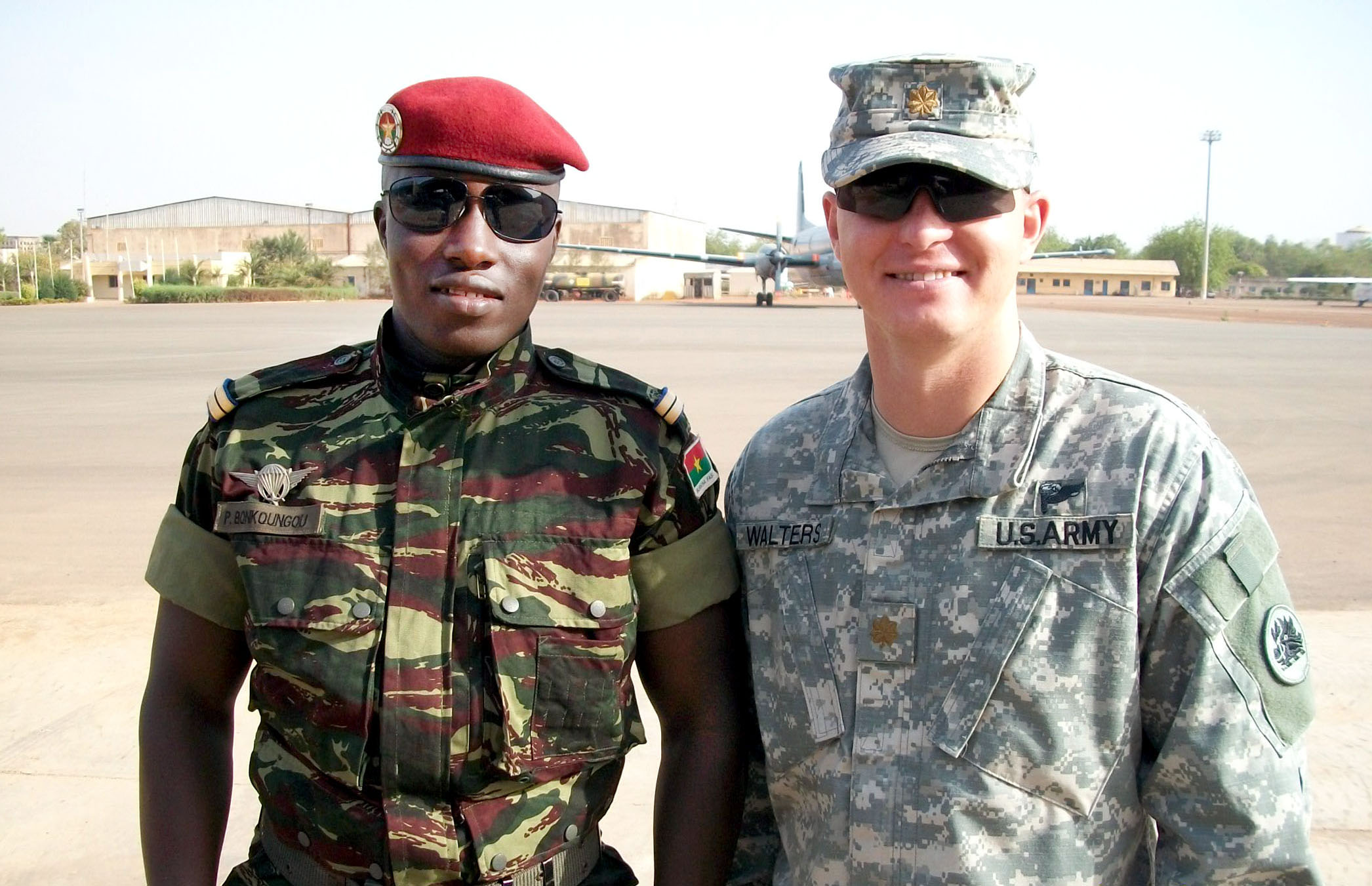
A Burkinabè lieutenant wearing a maroon beret.

Members of the Burkina Faso Armed Forces wear a maroon beret.

== Canadian Army ==
Jump-qualified personnel in parachute units of the Canadian Army wear the maroon, provided they are in a designated parachute position. These are as follows:

- "C" and "Z" Batteries, 1st Regiment, Royal Canadian Horse Artillery
- "E" and "Y" Batteries, 2nd Regiment, Royal Canadian Horse Artillery
- 4 Troop, 12 Field Squadron, 1 Combat Engineer Regiment
- 5 Troop, 24 Field Squadron, 2 Combat Engineer Regiment
- 5 Troop, 53 Field Squadron, 5 Combat Engineer Regiment
- "M" Company, 3rd Battalion, The Royal Canadian Regiment
- "A" Company, 3rd Battalion, Princess Patricia's Canadian Light Infantry
- "A" Company, 3rd Battalion, Royal 22^{e} Régiment
- Instructors, packer/riggers and jump-slotted members of the Canadian Army Advanced Warfare Centre at CFB Trenton
- Parachute Company, The Queen's Own Rifles of Canada

== Chilean Army ==
Since the creation of the Armored Cavalry in the Army, all personnel who serve in the Armored Cavalry unit wear maroon berets, using the same badges regardless of each member's speciality. Specialists in Armored Cavalry are trained in the Escuela de Caballería Blindada del Ejército (Armored Cavalry School of Army), and currently it is the only branch of service whose members all wear berets; the other berets used in the Chilean Army distinguished only specialists (mountain troops, paratroopers, or special forces) and, in the last years, the combined branch of service regiment, called Regimientos Reforzados.

== Czech Army ==
A maroon beret is worn by the 601st Special Forces Group, the 43rd Airborne Regiment and other soldiers with airborne specialization. Was formerly worn also by the soldiers of the 4th Rapid Deployment Brigade due to their original airborne capability before switching to entirely mechanized infantry role and therefore adopting the common Ground forces' khaki beret in 2023. A maroon beret was worn by the Republic's president Petr Pavel

== Danish Army Special Forces ==
Danish Army Special Forces, Jægerkorpset wears the Maroon Beret with a brass emblem depicting a hunter's bugle on a black felt liner. The beret is issued after completion of 16 weeks of SF training. However, not before 1 year of additional satisfactory service in JGK is the wearer issued the shoulder patch "JÆGER" and may call himself by this name.

== French Army ==
The maroon beret is not worn by any active French military unit, however. Since 1957, nearly all French Army paratroopers wear a red beret; the sole exception among the conventional airborne forces being the 2nd Foreign Parachute Regiment, which retains the traditional green beret of the French Foreign Legion.

Among the French special forces, the French Army's 1er RPIMa and 13th Parachute Dragoon Regiment operators respectively wear an amaranth beret and the standard red beret; the Commandos Marine of the French Navy retain their legacy green beret; while the Air Parachute Commando n° 10 (CPA 10) of the French Air and Space Force wear a dark blue beret. The latter is also worn by the elite paratroopers of the Air Parachute Commando n° 20 (CPA 20) and Air Parachute Commando n° 30 (CPA 30), although unlike the CPA 10, they're not part of the special forces.

== Finnish Army ==
The Special Jäger Battalion (Finnish: Erikoisjääkäripataljoona) trains personnel in the Utti Jaeger Regiment, Utti, Finland. Jump-qualified personnel are allowed to wear the maroon beret.

== German Army ==
A maroon beret is worn by the German Kommando Spezialkräfte (KSK, Special Forces), all members of the Division Schnelle Kräfte (DSK, containing the Fallschirmjäger) and the German Army Aviation Corps (Heeresfliegertruppe).

== Greek Army ==
Maroon berets are worn by members of the 1st Army Aviation Brigade.

== Guatemalan Army ==
Maroon berets are worn by Kaibiles, Guatemala's special forces.

== India ==
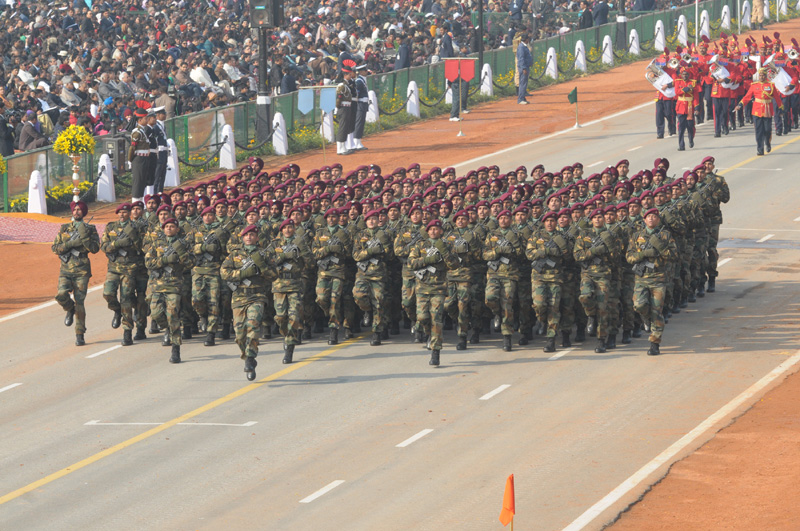
A contingent of Indian Army's Parachute Regiment marching down Rajpath during the Republic Day Parade in New Delhi in 2012.

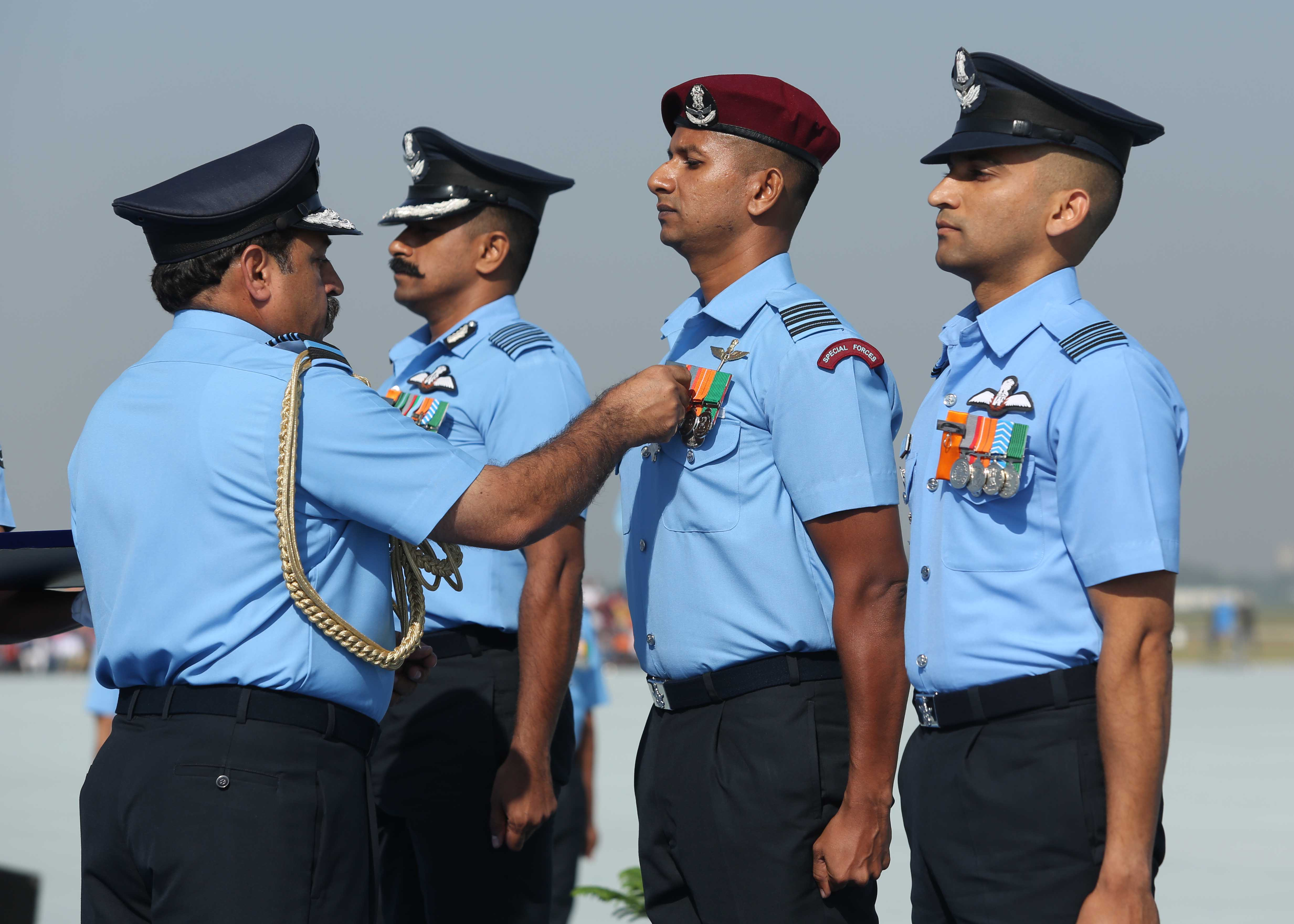
A commando of the Indian Air Force's Garud Commando Force.

=== Army ===
The Indian Army's adopted the maroon baret in 1946. The maroon beret is currently exclusive to the Parachute Regiment, Para (Special Forces), and other parachute-qualified personnel in airborne formations (eg. 50th Parachute Brigade). The President's Bodyguard (composed exclusively of tall Jats and Rajputs), a ceremonial guard unit with their operational role as the pathfinder company of the parachute brigade, also wears the maroon beret.

=== Navy ===
The MARCOS (Marine Commandos) of the Indian Navy are all para qualified and wear the maroon beret. They are the only Indian unit qualified to para drop into water with a full combat load.

=== Air Force ===
The Indian Air Force's special operations force, Garud Commando Force, also wears the maroon beret and are parachute trained, with some personnel even free fall qualified.

== Indonesia ==
Because Indonesian Airborne Paratrooper Battalions (Yonif Para Raider) are part of the Kostrad infantry division, they do not wear maroon berets as an independent regiment or corps, but instead wear green berets (Kostrad berets), identifying an army infantry group which is in the internal scope of the Kostrad division command.

=== Army ===
Maroon berets are the official headgear of Army Aviation Center. This beret is worn by all its personnel. Established on 23 March 2007, the beret replaced all the berets previously used by the personnel.

=== Navy ===
In the Indonesian Navy naval special forces unit, KOPASKA, tactical divers wear maroon berets.

== Israeli Army ==
In the Israel Defense Forces, maroon beret is worn by the Tzanhanim Paratrooper Brigade and some elite special forces units (Sayeret Matkal, Oketz, Maglan, Duvdevan, Egoz and others).

== Italian Army ==
In the Italian Armed Forces, maroon berets are worn only by paratroopers: the army units Folgore Parachute Brigade, Carabinieri Regiment "Tuscania" and Gruppo di intervento speciale, and the police elite unit Nucleo operativo centrale di sicurezza. However, an exception applies to the Alpini Paratroopers (the 4th Alpini Paratroopers Regiment), who are qualified paratroopers and rangers but traditionally wear a distinctive green beret to honor their mountain infantry heritage.

== Japan Ground Self-Defense Force ==
Members of the Japan Ground Self-Defense Force 1st Airborne Brigade wear maroon berets with an enamel pin bearing the brigade emblem.

== Lithuanian Armed Forces ==
In the Lithuanian Armed Forces, maroon berets are worn only by Volunteer Forces that took it from their initial Rapid Reaction Squad guarding the Parliament in 1991 that intended to become a paratrooper unit in the future. However, SKAT staff officers really liked it and started to wear and the other units followed them later replacing their traditional caps.

== Malaysia ==
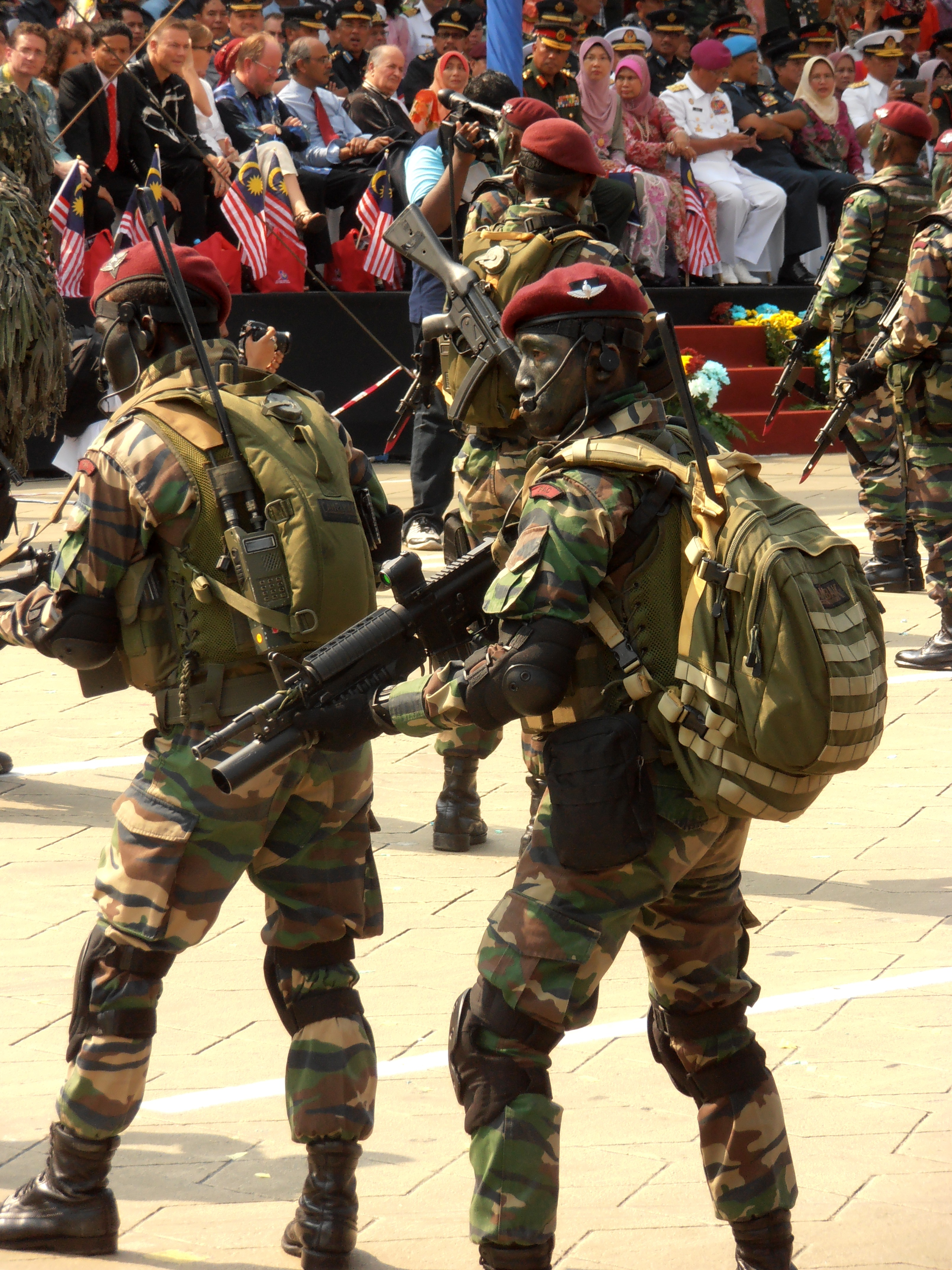
The 10th Parachute Brigade paratroopers wearing the maroon beret

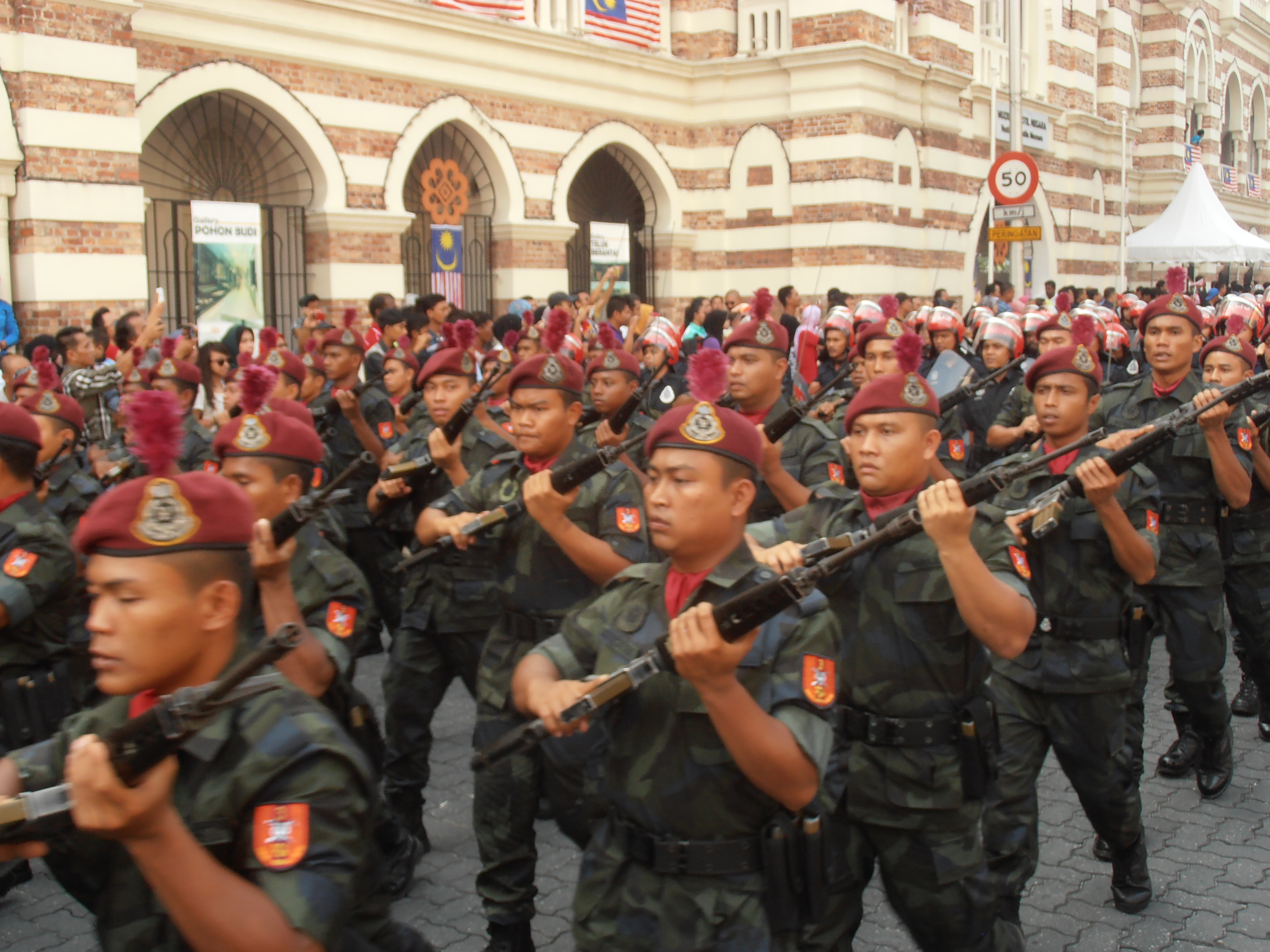
Personnel from Senoi Praaq of Royal Malaysia Police wearing the maroon beret

=== Army ===
The Malaysian Army's elite 10th Parachute Brigade has worn the maroon beret since its establishment in 1994.

=== Police ===
The Royal Malaysia Police has a two units wearing the maroon berets. The unit is:

- The Pasukan Gerakan Khas A-Detachment, also known as the Special Actions Unit, has worn the maroon beret with black hackle since its formation on 1 January 1975.
- The Senoi Praaq of the General Operations Force wears the maroon beret with yellow hackle.

Both of the units had their maroon berets bestowed by the Special Air Service.

== Lebanese Army ==
The maroon berets are worn by the Army Rangers Regiment known as Maghaweer and by the Navy Seals known as Maghaweer El Bahr (Naval Commando). The current commander in chief General Joseph Aoun, himself having been in Maghaweer, allowed military personnel who have a Ranger badge to keep wearing their maroon berets even when serving in other non special forces units. The current military council (6 members) includes two Maghaweer General Joseph Aoun and Major General Georges Chreim.

== Mexican Army ==
The maroon berets are worn by Mexico's Parachute Rifle Brigade called the Brigada de Fusileros Paracaidistas created in 1969 as a rapid response team.

== Namibian Army ==
The maroon beret is worn by Namibian Special Forces specifically the Commandos and Paratroopers.

== Netherlands Army ==
The Dutch Army's Air Mobile Force/Light infantry, 11 Luchtmobiele Brigade, which translates to 11 Air Mobile Brigade, wear "The Maroon Berets" (aka the Red Beret) as a sign of their status upon completion of their training.

== Norwegian Army ==
The Norwegian Special Operations Commando has worn the maroon beret since its forerunner Army Parachute Ranger School establishment in 1965.

== Pakistan Armed Forces ==
=== Army ===
The Special Service Group (SSG) wears a maroon beret with a silver SSG badge on a sky blue flash. Line infantry regiments which were parachute trained wore their own regiments' berets till airborne role was taken away from infantry and assigned to SSG which became the army's only airborne outfit from 1964 onwards. In addition to SSG, Army Aviation and Air Defence, Army medical corps wear maroon berets

=== Navy ===
Navy's Special Service Group, SSG(N) wear maroon berets

=== Air Force ===
PAF's elite Special Service Wing (SSW) wears maroon berets

== Polish Army ==
The maroon beret is worn by paratroopers in the Polish Armed Forces, called the Bordowe Berety in Polish, and also members of the air cavalry. The beret is always decorated with an embroidered White Eagle (Polish coat of arms) and rank insignia. It is worn with the ceremonial uniform as well as the field uniform.

== Portuguese Armed Forces ==
In the Portuguese Armed Forces, the maroon beret was worn by the members of the GEP Battalion, from 1971 to 1974.

The GEP was an elite paramilitary paratrooper unit, consisting of native volunteers, that were employed in counter-insurgency operations, during the Mozambican War of Independence.

== Russian Armed Forces ==
The maroon beret is worn by members of elite Ministry of Internal Affairs (MVD) Spetsnaz units, although it is referred to as krapoviy meaning crimson. In a contrast to the Western style, Russian troops wear the badge on the beret over the right eye.

== Serbian Armed Forces ==
The maroon beret is worn by members of elite 63rd Parachute Brigade, the only parachute unit of the Serbian Armed Forces.

== Singapore Armed Forces Commandos ==
The crimson beret is worn by the Commandos formation of the Singapore Armed Forces (SAF) depicting their status as an elite airborne and special forces unit.

== Slovak Armed Forces ==
A maroon beret is worn by members of the 5th Special Operations Regiment and by the qualified Slovak Air Force Search and Rescue service members.

== Somali Armed Forces ==
The maroon beret is the standard issue beret of the Somali Army.

== South Africa ==
The maroon beret is worn by both the Special Forces and 44 Parachute Regiment. (Parachute qualified members of 7 Medical Battalion Group wear the standard crimson beret of the South African Military Health Service.)

== Soviet Union ==
In the Soviet Union, paratroopers wore a maroon beret until the late 1960s when General Vasily Filipovich Margelov decided that a maroon beret for paratroopers was a Western idea and introduced a cornflower blue beret. This may have been influenced by the cornflower blue of the Soviet Air Force and the cornflower blue helmets worn by Soviet paratroopers during the Great Patriotic War.

== Spanish Army ==
The 1st King's Immemorial Infantry Regiment of AHQ, the oldest military unit in the world, wears the maroon beret.

The Regimiento de Inteligencia 1 (Intelligence Regiment 1) based in Valencia wears the maroon beret, as do all units belonging to the Cuartel General Terrestre de Alta disponibilidad (GTAD). Spanish airborne forces have traditionally worn a black beret.

== Sri Lanka Army ==
The Commando Regiment of the Sri Lanka Army wears the maroon beret, and is one of the two special forces in Sri Lanka Army along with the Special Forces Regiment .

== Swedish Army ==
A maroon beret is worn by Fallskärmsjägarna, a jump qualified Swedish Army special operations unit. This is an airborne commando unit focused on intelligence gathering and squad level combat deep behind enemy lines.

== Royal Thai Army ==
The Royal Thai Army Special Operations Force and paratroopers in the 31st Infantry Regiment, King Bhumibol's Guard wear the maroon beret.

== Turkey ==
The Turkish Armed Forces Special Operations Force, aka Bordo Bereliler, which translates as "The Maroon Berets", is named for their distinctive headgear.

Bordo Bereliler are part of the Special Forces Command (Özel Kuvvetler Komutanlığı) and are composed of professional personnel selected from different branches of the Turkish Armed Forces. The unit is tasked with conducting special operations, including counter-terrorism, special reconnaissance, direct action, and unconventional warfare missions, both domestically and abroad.

The maroon beret is awarded only after the successful completion of a highly selective training and qualification process. Due to the sensitive nature of their duties, details regarding personnel numbers, organization, and specific operations are not publicly disclosed.

== Ukraine ==
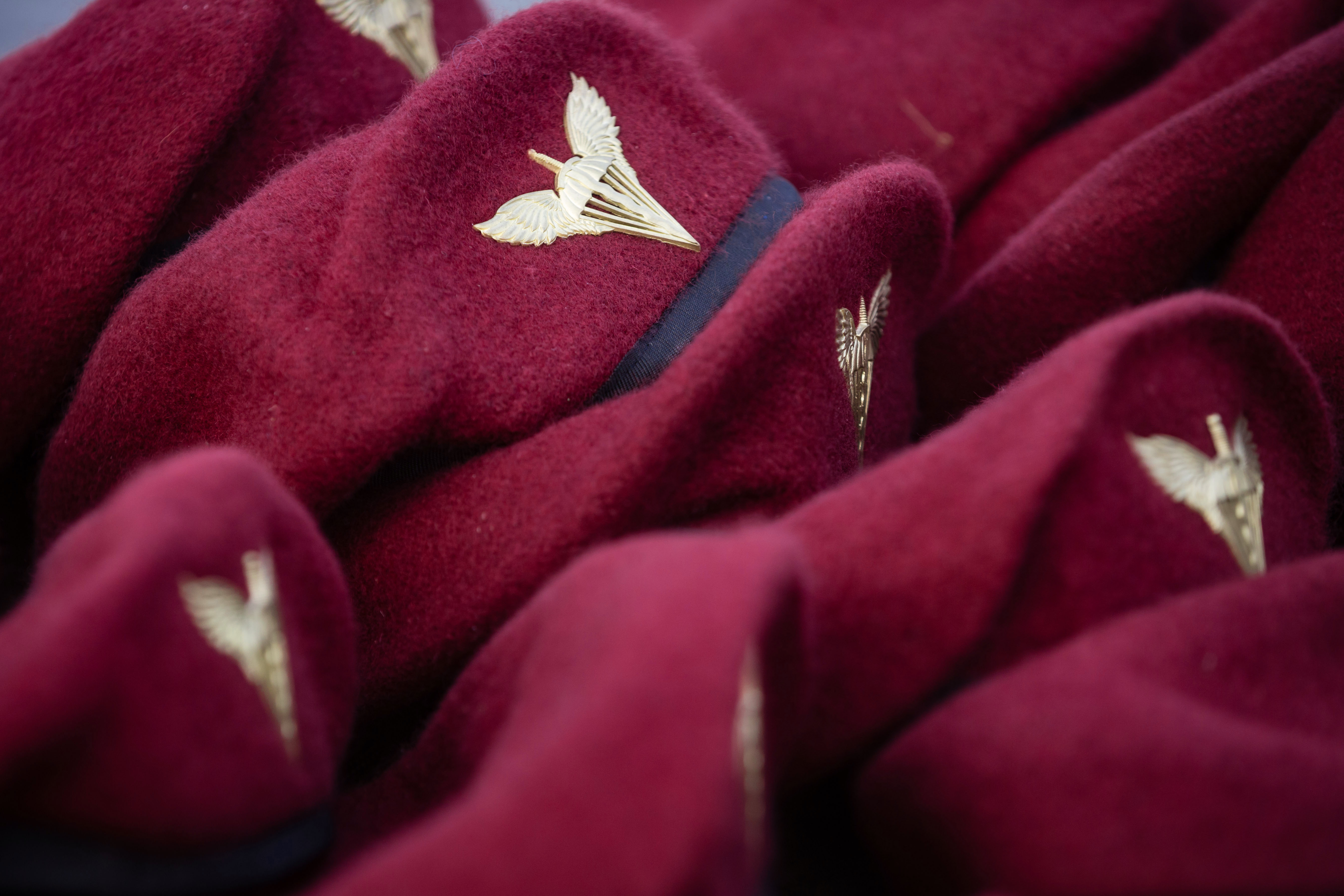
Maroon berets of Ukrainian Air Assault Forces

On 21 November 2017 (Ukraine's Paratroopers' Day) the color of the Ukrainian paratroopers was changed to maroon, replacing soviet-style blue, as a part of new army uniform. The Air Assault Forces also received its new insignia (the dome of a parachute "as a symbol of airborne units around the world" and the wings of Archangel Michael and "the flaming sword with which he hits the enemies").

== United States ==
=== United States Air Force ===
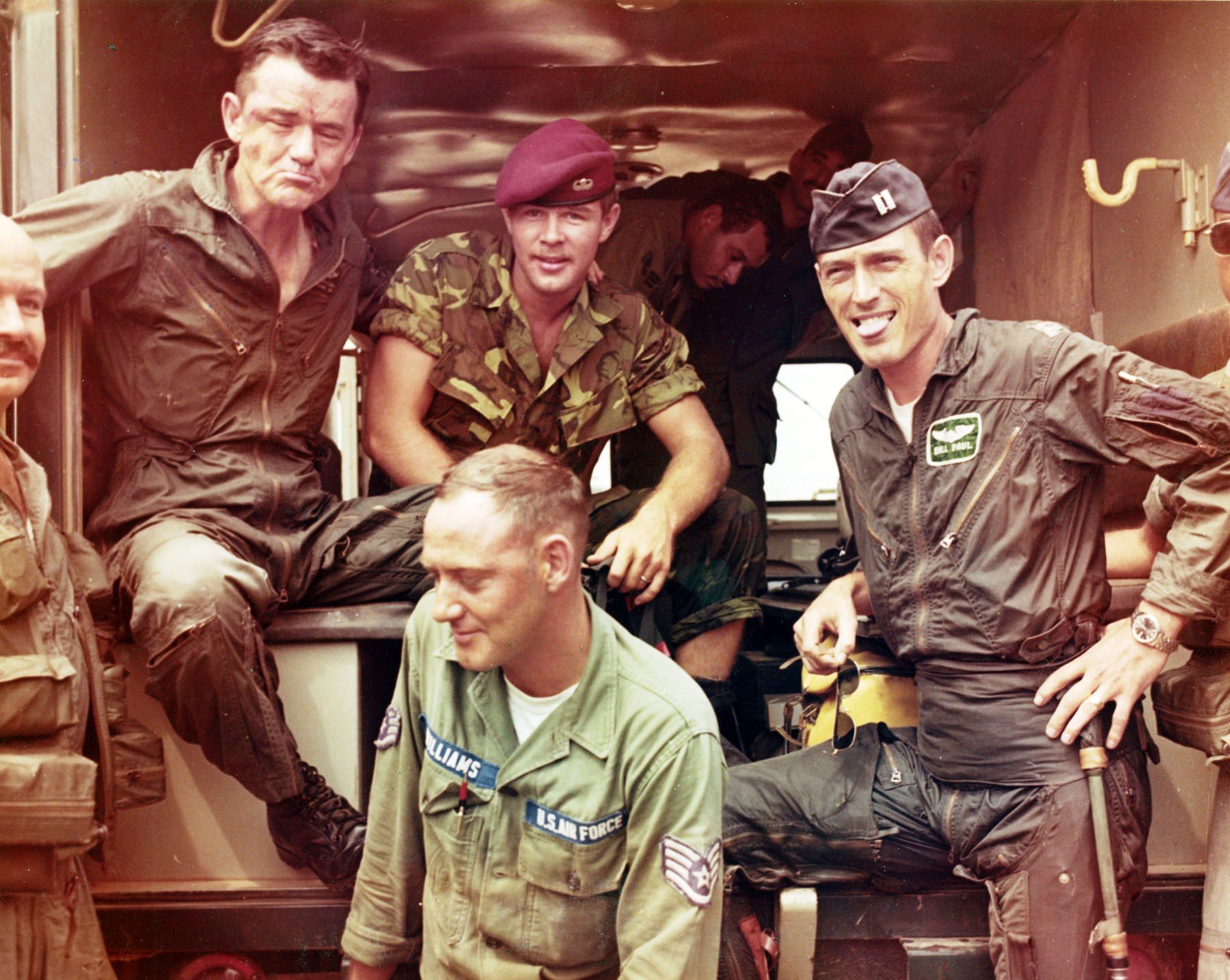
A pararescueman wearing maroon beret with his Parachutist Badge after returning from recovering downed airmen from North Vietnam (1967)

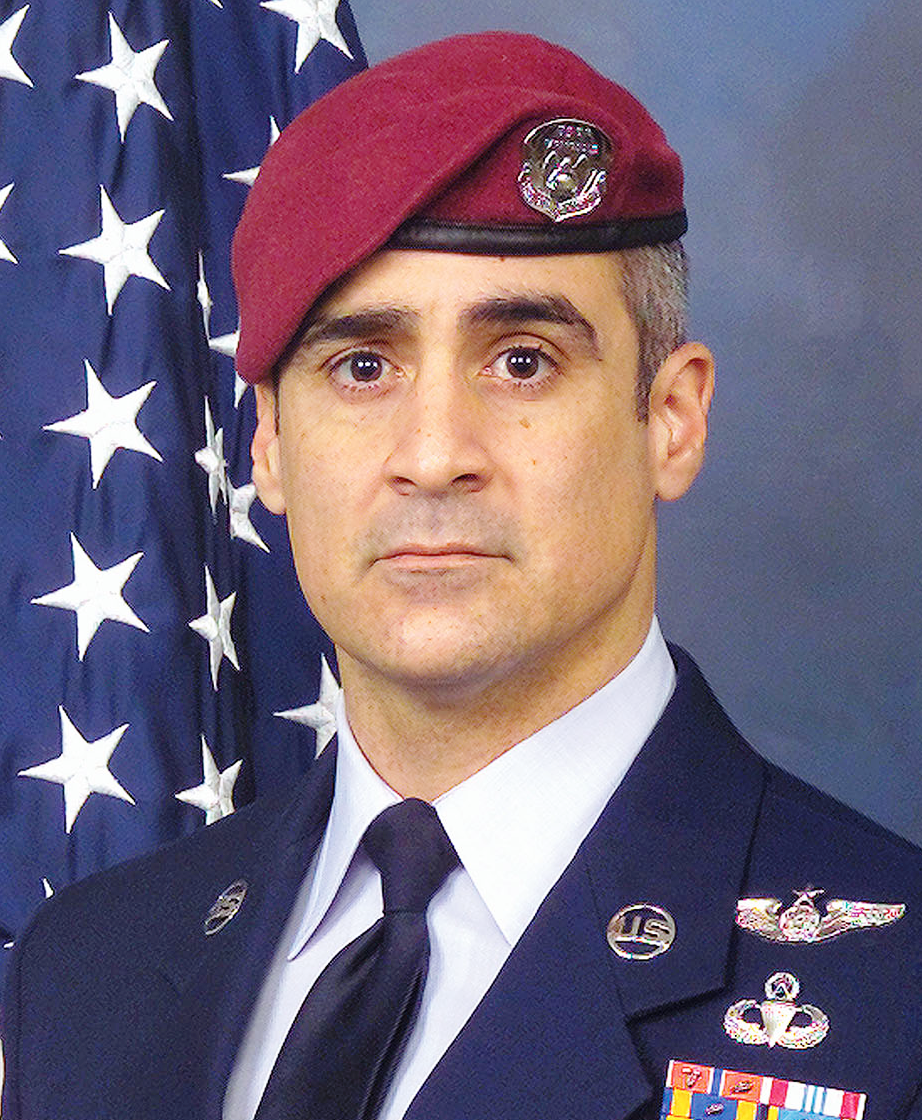
A pararescueman—then CMSgt Colón-López—wearing maroon beret with Pararescueman Crest (2005)

Maroon berets are worn by United States Air Force Pararescue personnel and United States Air Force Combat Rescue Officers. Pararescuemen (PJs) are among the most highly trained emergency trauma specialists in the U.S. military and the only ones in the Department of Defense specifically trained and equipped to conduct conventional and unconventional rescue processes, making them the ideal force to handle personnel recovery and combat search and rescue operations. In early 1966, General John P. McConnell, then Air Force Chief of Staff, approved the wearing of the maroon beret.

=== United States Army ===
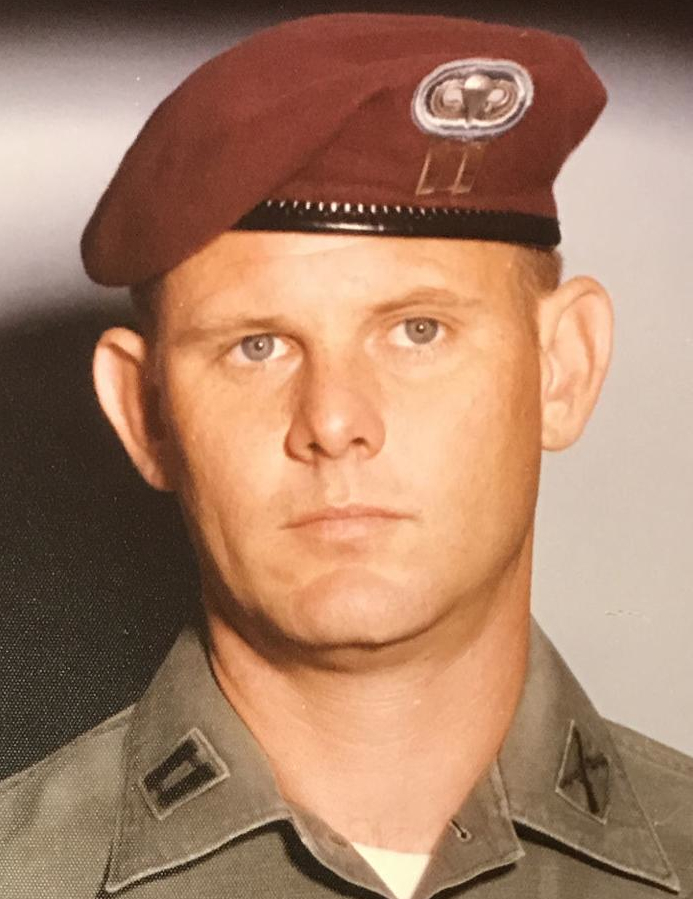
Then Captain Dan McKinney with the US Army Infantry School's Airborne Department wearing maroon beret with his Parachutist Badge and background trimming above his rank insignia (c. 1973)

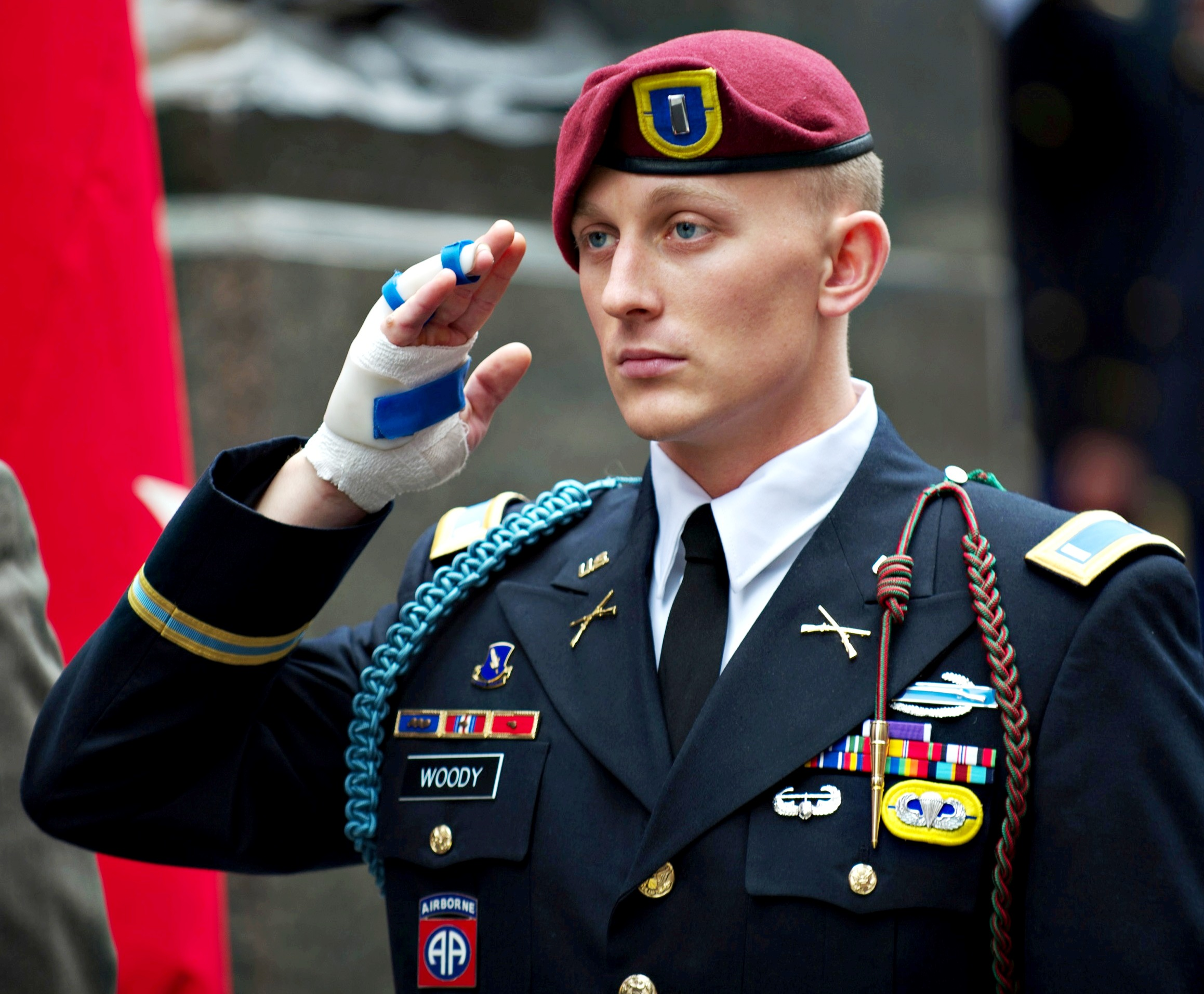
An infantry officer with the 82nd Airborne Division, 1st Infantry Brigade Combat Team, 1st Battalion, 504th Infantry Regiment at a U.S. Army birthday celebration wearing a maroon beret with his battalion beret flash and 1st Lieutenant rank insignia (2012)

In 1943, during the Second World War, Lieutenant-General Sir Frederick Browning, commander of the British I Airborne Corps, granted a battalion of the US Army's 509th Parachute Infantry Regiment honorary membership in the British Parachute Regiment and authorized them to wear British-style maroon berets. US Army advisers to Vietnamese airborne forces wore the Vietnamese French-style red beret during the Vietnam War.

Headquarters, Department of the Army (HQDA) policy from 1973 through 1979 permitted local commanders to encourage morale-enhancing distinctions. Airborne forces chose to wear the maroon international parachute beret as a mark of distinction. However, due to the variety to headgear utilized at unit level, such as the Stetson being used in cavalry units, this permission was rescinded in 1979 when the army introduced a policy of standardized headgear. Exceptions were allowed for the continued wearing of the black beret (changed to tan in 2001) for the 75th Ranger Regiment & Ranger Training Brigade, and the green beret for Special Forces. On 28 November 1980, permission was given for airborne organizations to resume wearing the maroon beret.

"The French Hat" (History of the maroon beret in the US Army, from the perspective of the 82nd Airborne Division)

== Venezuelan National Guard ==
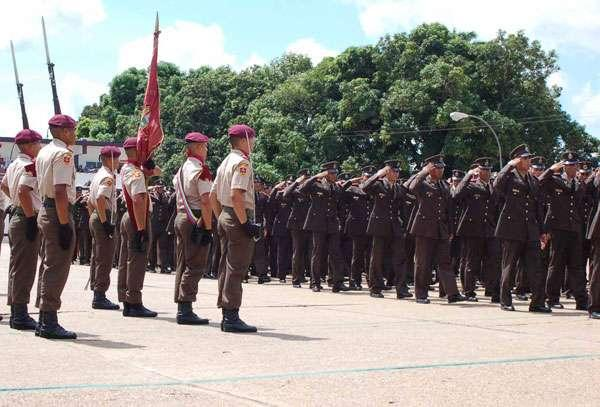
Bolivarian National Guard of Venezuela

All personnel of the Venezuelan National Guard wear maroon berets.

== See also ==
Other military berets by colour:

- Black beret
- Green beret
- Red beret
- Tan beret
