= Aloysius Mukasa =

Ugandan politician (b. 1983)

Aloysius Mukasa Talton Gold
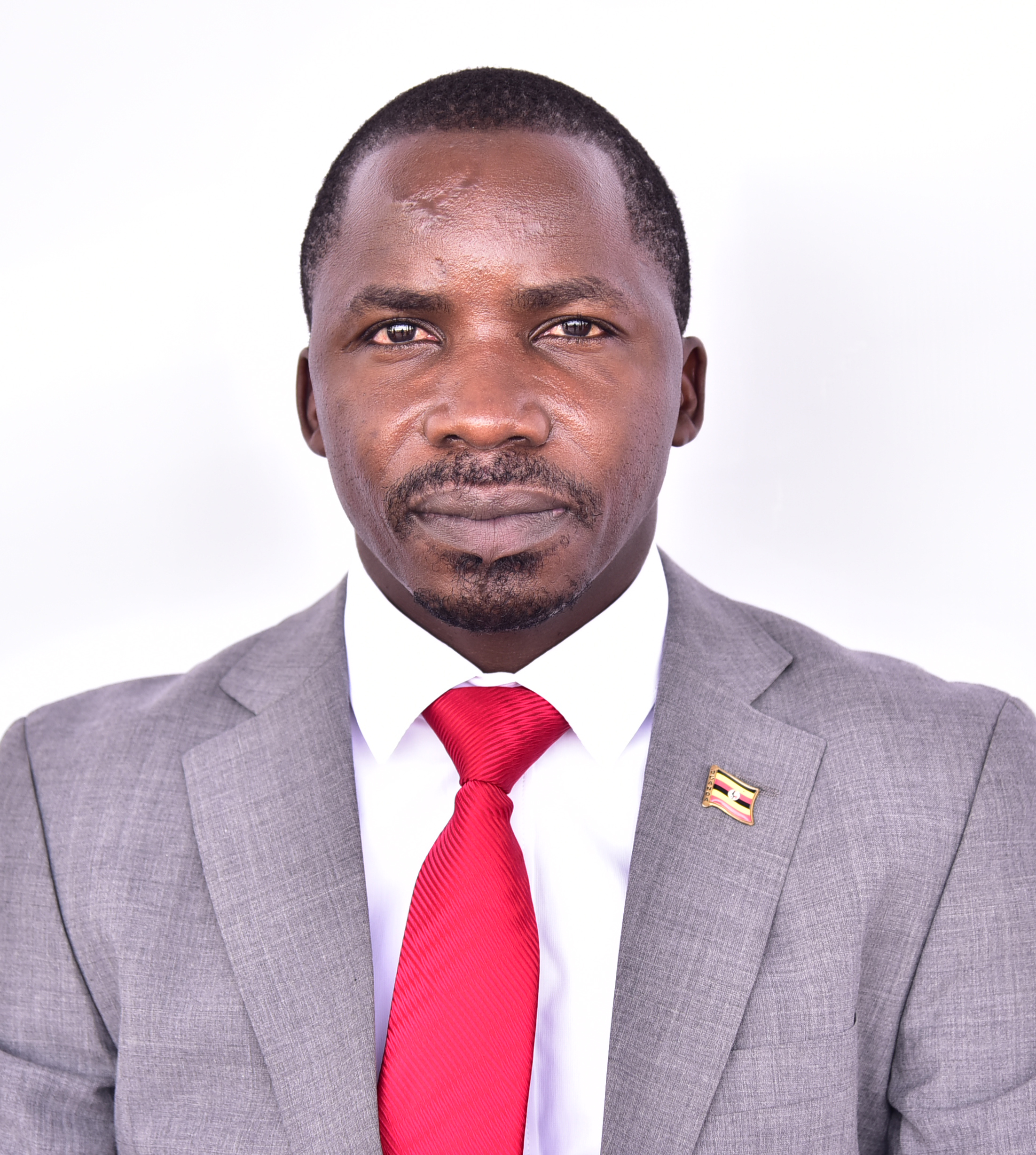

Member of the Uganda Parliament for Rubaga South, Kampala District
- In office 2021–Present
- Preceded by: Hon. Kato Lubwama ( National Resistance Movement party(NRM))

Personal details
- Born: 15 October 1983 (age 42) Kampala, Uganda
- Citizenship: Uganda
- Party: National Unity Platform (NUP), People Power, Our Power movement
- Education: Ndejje University

Aloysius Mukasa TG (born 1983) is a Ugandan entrepreneur, politician and Member of Parliament representing Rubaga South, Kampala District in Uganda's 11th Parliament (2021-2026). He is a member of the opposition party, National Unity Platform (NUP) and a diehard supporter of the People Power, Our Power movement.

== Career ==
Mukasa started advocating for human rights while at university at Ndejje University. During his work under People Power, he provided an ambulance to provide free emergency medical services for all Rubaga South people.

Mukasa beat fourteen other candidates to become the Member of Parliament for Rubaga South in Kampala winning with 49,501 votes. However, his win was not accepted by another candidate Nassolo Eugenia who petitioned the high Court for the nullification of his victory due to his alleged academic qualifications. Uganda National Examinations Board (UNEB) released Mukasa's academic results on Nassolo's lawyer's request, and the results showed that he had failed the Uganda Advanced Certification of Education exams, which would make him ineligible for a Member of Parliament seat. The petition was later withdrawn and Mukasa remained in his position as a member of parliament. He was sworn in as the Member of Parliament representing Rubaga South on 19 May 2021. In Parliament, he was selected as member of both the Equal Opportunities Committee and the East African Affairs Committee.

== See Also ==
- Anita Among
- Thomas Tayebwa
- Joel Senyonyi
- Amos Lugoloobi
