= Milly Nassolo =

Ugandan social entrepreneur

Milly Kikomeko
- Born: Milly Nassolo; 1993 (age 32–33); Kikumbo Village, Butambala District, Uganda
- Other name: Milly Nassolo Kikomeko
- Education: Mpigi Mixed Secondary School, Mpigi High School
- Occupations: social entrepreneur, activist, lawyer
- Known for: Activism, peer education, women's empowerment, social entrepreneurship
- Spouses: Robert Kikomeko Tumusabe (m. 2016)

Milly Nassolo Kikomeko is a Ugandan social entrepreneur, activist and lawyer. She is founder of Maisha Holistic Africa Foundation, a non-profit organization based in Kagadi District.

== Early life and education ==
Nassolo was born in Kikumbo Village, Kibibi Subcounty, in Butambala District. She attended Gombe Primary School for her primary education, followed by Mpigi Mixed Secondary School for O-Level, and pursued her A-level studies at Mpigi High School. She obtained her Bachelor of Laws degree from Kampala International University.

== Career ==
Since 2014, Nassolo has been serving as a legal assistant at Lubega, Ssaka and Co. Advocates while she was still an undergraduate. In 2014, she founded Maisha Holistic Africa Foundation, a non-profit organisation based in Kagadi District however the organisation was launched in 2019.

== Personal life ==
Nassolo married Robert Kikomeko Tumusabe in 2016 at Kamwokya Church of God. Together, they have two sons, Tyler Kaeb K. Tumusabe and Travis Silver K. Tumusabe
