= 4th Rapid Deployment Brigade =

- 4. brigáda rychlého nasazení
- Emblem of the 4th Rapid Deployment Brigade
- Active: 1 July 1994-present
- Country: Czech Republic
- Branch: Czech Land Forces
- Role: mechanized infantry
- Size: Brigade
- Part of: Rapid Forces Division (Since 2017)
- Garrison/HQ: Žatec
- Nickname: Obrany Národa
- Mottos: Tam, kde jiní nestačí
- Equipment: Pandur II; Iveco LMV
- Engagements: IFOR; SFOR; Kosovo Force; War in Afghanistan
- Decorations: Cross of Merit of the Minister of Defence 1st Grade
- Website: https://4brn.army.cz/

Commanders
- Current commander: Brig. Gen. Jiří Líbal
- Notable commanders: Army Gen. Jiří Šedivý; Army Gen. Aleš Opata; Major Gen. Roman Náhončík

The 4th (Czech) Rapid Deployment Brigade (4. brigáda rychlého nasazení) is a brigade of the Army of the Czech Republic. It is assigned to the NATO Allied Rapid Reaction Corps. Units from the brigade have deployed as part of KFOR, ISAF and EUTM Mali. Elements of the brigade were deployed in support of the emergency services during the floods in 1997, 2002 and 2013. The brigade consists of three battalions and is considered as spearhead of the Army of the Czech Republic. It builds the core of the 4th Brigade Task Force. For 29 years soldiers of the brigade wore maroon berets as elements of the brigade were trained as paratroopers, especially 43rd Airborne Battalion. In June 2023 the whole brigade changed to the new khaki berets as the rest of the ground forces.

== History ==
The brigade HQ was created on 1 January 1994 in Havlíčkův Brod as part of the 4th Mechanized Infantry Division with the activation of the whole brigade on 1 July 1994. The first commander was then Colonel Jiří Šedivý who later became chief of the general staff. At the time of creation, it was combined arms brigade with 2 mechanized infantry battalions (41st and 42nd), mechanized airborne battalion (43rd), recon battalion, artillery group as well as engineering, signal and logistic battalions, NBC protection company and medical group. It was in direct command of chief of general staff as national Immediate Response Force. It was equipped with BVP-2 IFV at the time.

In 1997 it was transferred under command of the Land Forces. In that year units of the brigade were deployed to help with cleaning efforts after floods in Moravia. After joining NATO in March 1999 it became part of the NATO Rapid Reaction Force.

On 8 May 1999, brigade received honorary name "Obrany Národa" from president Václav Havel.

During the floods in August 2002 soldiers of the brigade were again deployed as part of the support of the emergency servises, this time in Vodňany, Znojmo and Prague.

In 2003, it was reduced in size as part of reorganisation of the Czech Army. From the original 10 battalions, only three mechanized ones remained, one of them airborne. One year after that reorganisation, the HQ together with the 41st mechanized battalion were transferred to Žatec.

In 2008, the strength of the unit was increased with newly formed 44th motorised light infantry battalion at Jindřichův Hradec that was formed from disbanded 153rd rescue battalion of 15th engineer brigade.

In 2010, the 41st and 42nd mechanized battalions exchanged their old tracked BVP-2 IFV for wheeled Pandur II vehicles. In 2016, a new battalion was expected to be formed – the 45th mechanized infantry bn. at Rakovník. That decision however changed, and after transferring its organisational core to 15th engineer regiment, it eventually became the Host Nation Support Battalion.

In 2017, the brigade was affiliated to 10th Tank Division of Bundeswehr.

During the COVID-19 epidemic soldiers of all units of the 4th RDB were deployed in support of medical staff in hospitals and social workers in retirement homes.

On 1 October 2020, the 43rd airborne battalion was transferred to direct command of Land Forces and was reorganised into 43rd Airborne Regiment as a third ground maneuver element of the Czech Army. With that the brigade lost almost all of its airborne units.

In 2022 and 2023, units from 41st and 42nd mechanized battalions served as part of the newly created NATO eFP Slovakia battlegroup at Lešť military training center that is commanded by Czechia.

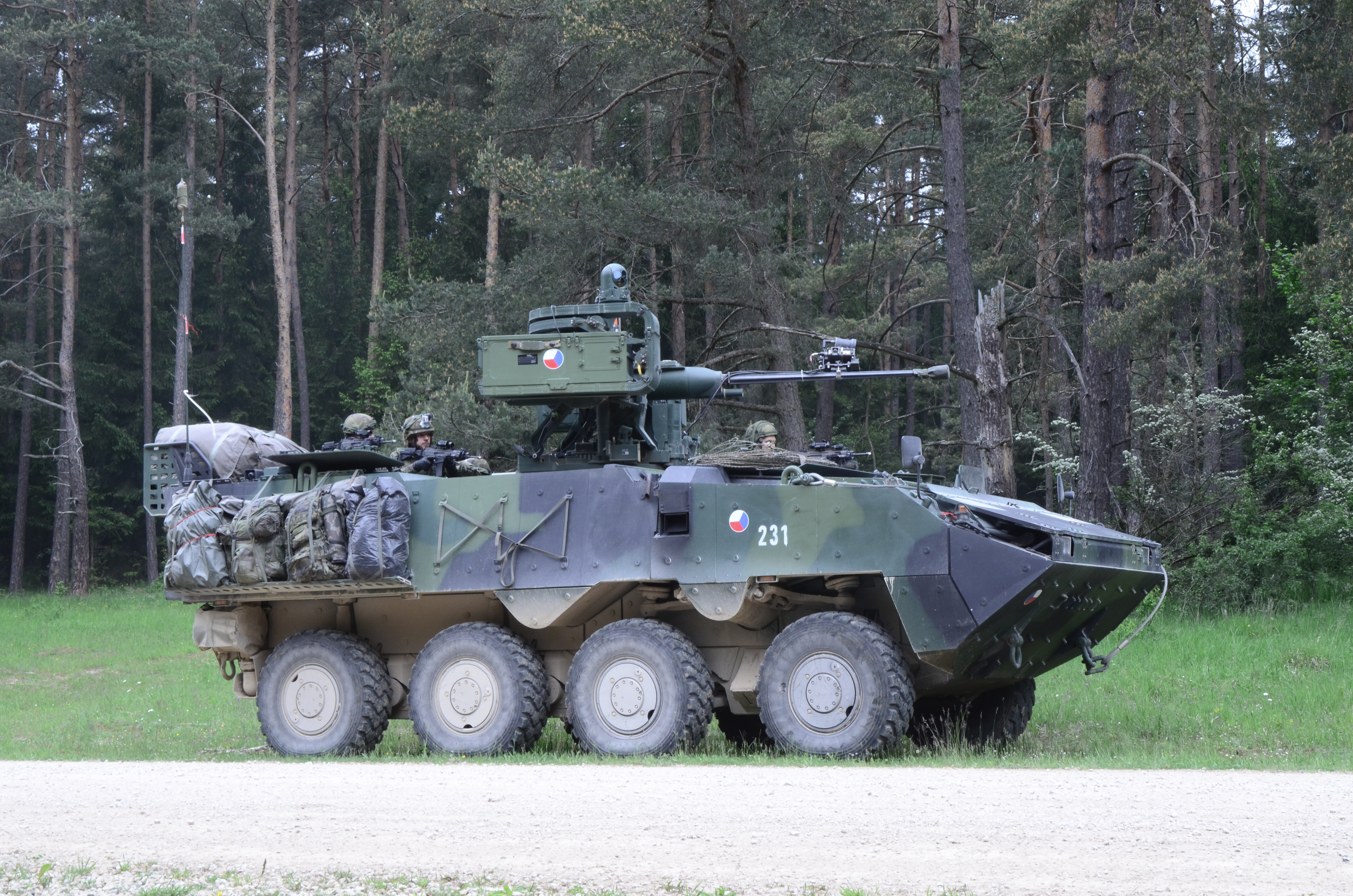
IFV Pandur II of 42nd Mech.Inf Bat.

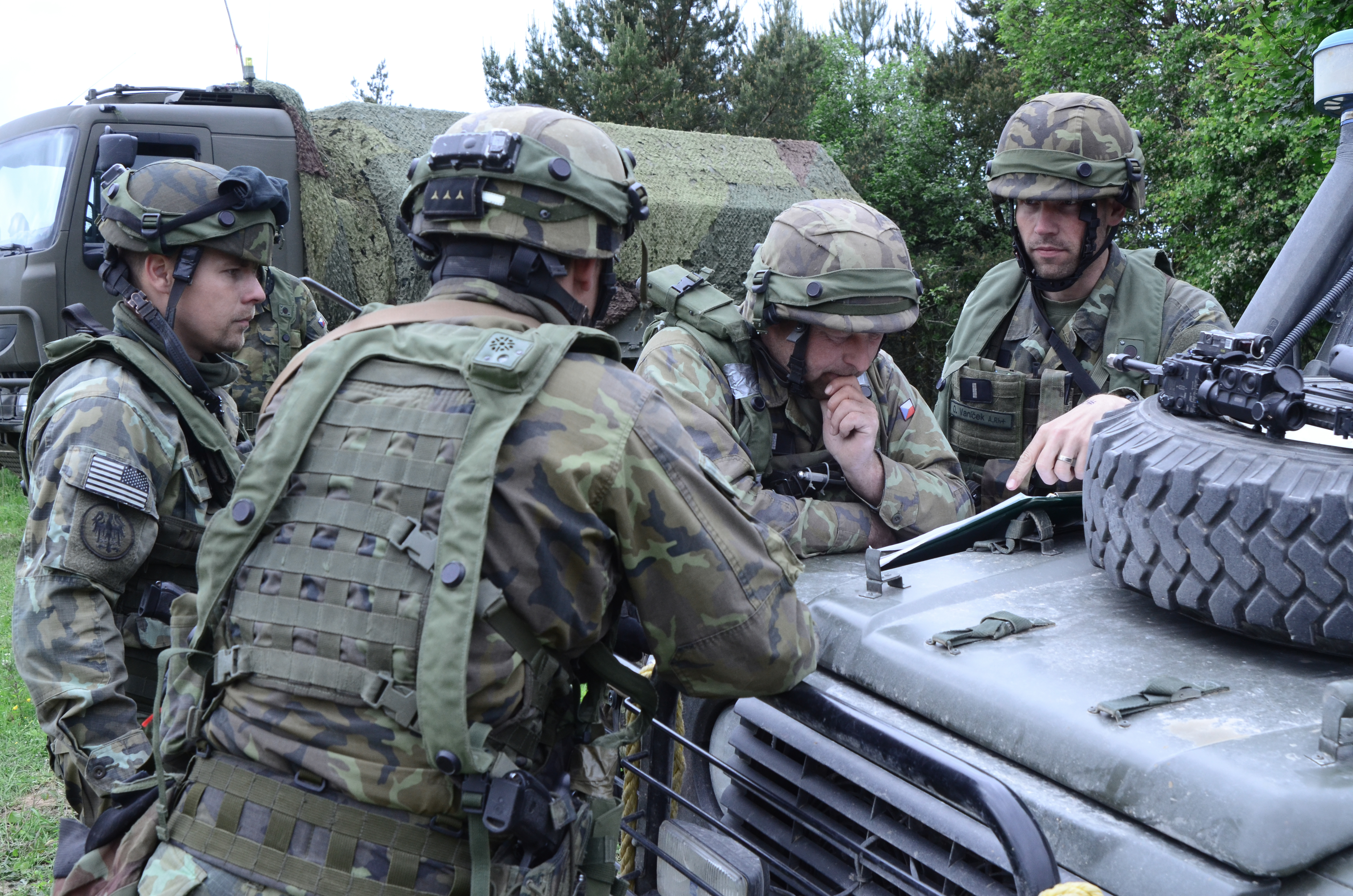
Soldiers of the 4th Rapid Deploynment Brigade

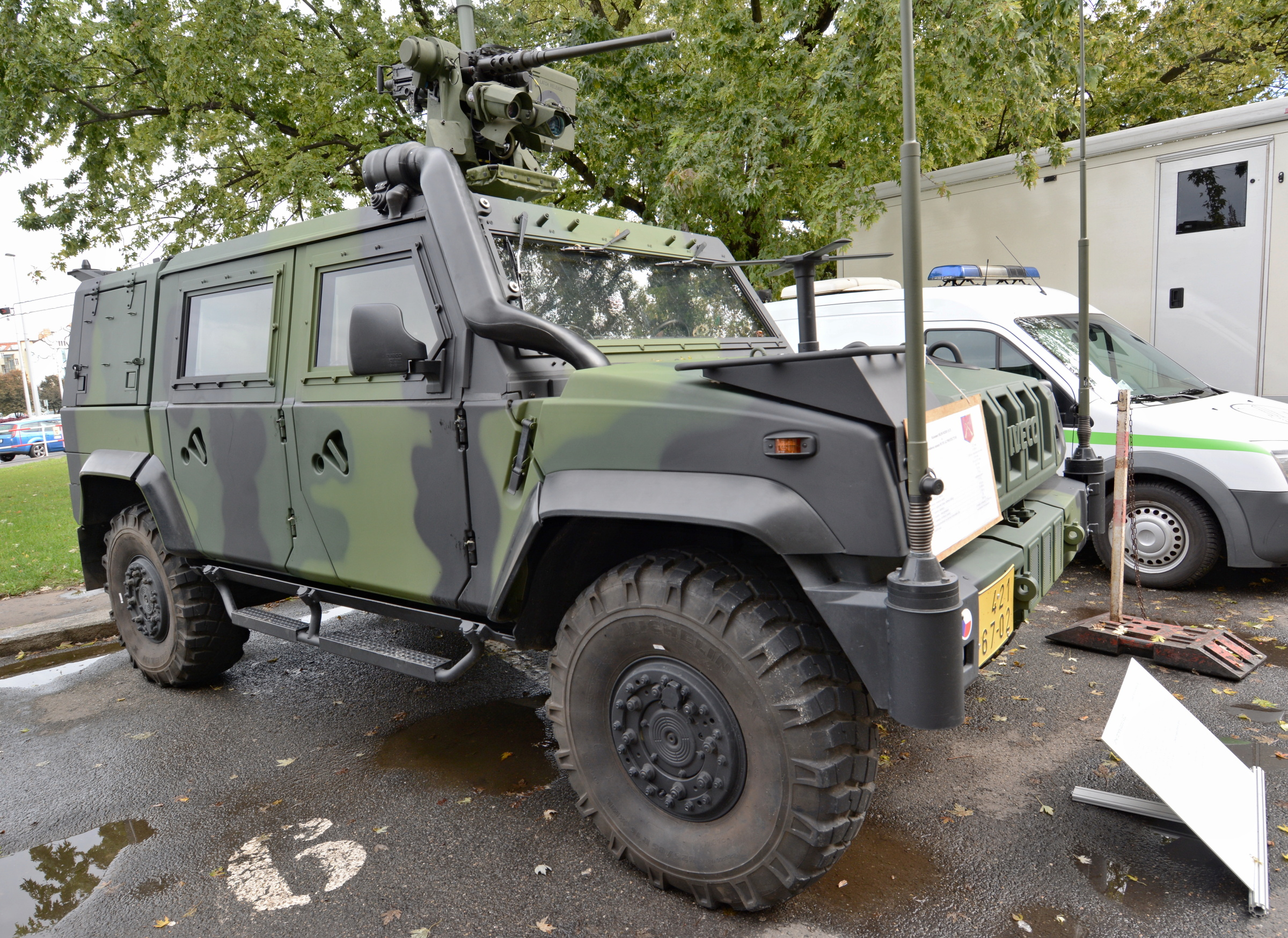
Iveco LMV of the 44th Motorised Infantry Battalion

== Structure ==
The brigade as of 2024 consists of following units:

- Headquarters and Staff (Žatec)
- 41. mechanizovaný prapor (41.mpr) "gen. Josefa Malého“. - 41st Mechanised (Infantry) Battalion (Žatec) (Pandur II)
- 42. mechanizovaný prapor (42.mpr) "Svatováclavský" - 42nd Mechanised (Infantry) Battalion (Tábor) (Pandur II)
- 44. lehký motorizovaný prapor (44.lmopr) - 44th Motorised Infantry Light Battalion (Jindřichův Hradec) (Iveco LMV)
- Signal company
- Support company
