= Shamim Nambassa =

Ugandan pharmacist and politician

- Born: 1999 (age 26–27); Kawempe, Kampala, Uganda
- Citizenship: Uganda
- Education: Makerere University (Bsc.Pharmacy)
- Alma mater: Makerere University
- Occupations: Politician, pharmacist, activist
- Years active: 2024 –present
- Known for: Public health advocacy
- Title: Dr.
- Political party: National Unity Platform

Shamim Nambassa (born 1999) is a Ugandan pharmacist, politician, public health advocate and activist who was the 87th guild president of Makerere University. She is the Woman Lord Councillor LC5 elect for Kawempe South.

== Early life and education ==
Nambassa was born in Kawempe to Ludius Twebere and Abdul Mugalula in a family of eight children; she is the fifth born.

She completed her primary education at Parental Care Primary School, Kasese, then attended Nabisunsa Girls' SS for both O- and A-level education. She was admitted to Makerere University on a government sponsorship for a Bachelor of Science in Pharmacy and graduated in 2024.

== Career ==
Nambassa is currently a practicing pharmacist interning at Yumbe Regional Referral Hospital. She attained various leadership roles, which include pharmacy class representative, guild representative councillor for the School of Health Sciences, and education minister in 2021. She was the guild president from 2021 to 2022 under the National Unity Platform flag while at Makerere University. She vied for LC5 councillor of Kawempe South, and emerged victorious.

== Personal life ==
Nambassa enjoys reading and watching documentaries.
