= 43rd Airborne Regiment =

43rd airborne regiment
- 43. výsadkový pluk
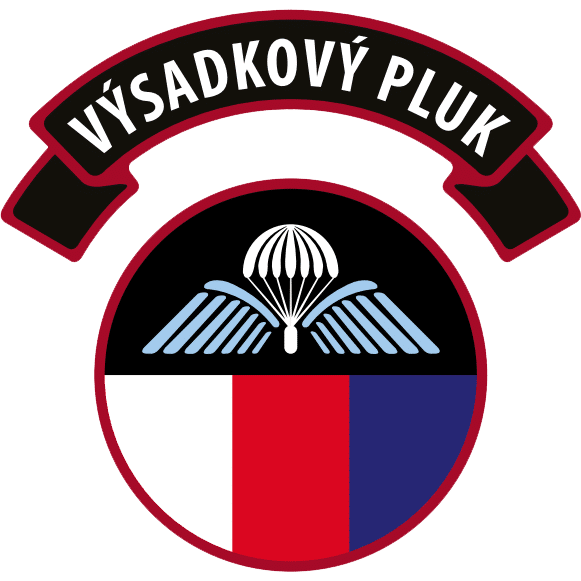
- Emblem of the 43rd Airborne regiment
- Active: 1 October 2020 - present
- Country: Czech Republic
- Branch: Czech Land Forces
- Type: light infantry
- Role: airborne infantry
- Size: Regiment
- Garrison/HQ: Chrudim
- Nickname: Československých parašutistů
- Motto: Sweat conserves blood
- Anniversaries: 1 October
- Website: https://43vysadkovypluk.cz

Commanders
- Commander: Colonel Petr Tesařík
- Deputy Commander: Lieutenant Colonel Jan Rýdlo
- Chief of Staff: Lieutenant Colonel Vladimír Hrubý

The 43rd Airborne Regiment (Czech: 43. výsadkový pluk) is a light Airborne infantry regiment of the Commando type of the Czech Army based in Chrudim. It is the Czech Army's third-largest and youngest main ground fighting unit for defence of the Czech Republic and for EU and NATO alliance forces. It was activated on 1 October 2020 from its direct predecessor, the 43rd Airborne Battalion of the 4th Rapid Deployment Brigade.

== History ==
=== 71st Parachute Battalion ===
43rd Regiment traces its roots to the Infantry Battalion 71 (Parachute) that was formed on 1 October 1947 at Zákupy u České Lípy as a first parachute unit in the peacetime Czechoslovak Army after WWII. Two years later it was renamed to Parachute Battalion 71 "Československých parašutistů" to honor Czechoslovak paratroopers both from west and east that served during World War II. Until 1950 the battalion's main tasks were small team operations, diversions and sabotages. It was however changed to align with Soviet doctrine after that year.

The 71st Parachute Battalion later formed together with two other airborne battalions (72nd and 65th) the 22nd Parachute Brigade in Prešov. In 1960 the brigade was transferred to Prostějov. After the Holešov incident when the soldiers of the 7th Parachute Regiment on special deployment did not allow Soviet units to its barracks on 21 August 1968, the brigade was reorganized to regiment and the 71st Parachute Battalion was disbanded in 1969.

On 1 October 1987 the 71st was reactivated at Chrudim barracks as a strike parachute battalion under direct command of the Western Military District in Tábor. On 6 May 1989, the battalion was presented Colours and its honorary title "národního hrdiny Jana Švermy".

=== 43rd Airborne Battalion ===
In 1991 it was renamed again to 71st Rapid Deployment Battalion and received its old name "Československých parašutistů". The size was increased to fill all positions on the subordinate units and when it was decided to form 4th Rapid Deployment Brigade the battalion was transferred to Inspectorate of Land Forces of General Staff of Czech Army and reorganised and renamed to 43rd Mechanized Airborne Infantry Battalion.

The Battalion became fully professional in 2000. In 2005 it received its new battle flag from president Václav Klaus. As the deployment and tasks of the battalion changed the "mechanized" was dropped from its name in 2014.

As a result of the 2014 NATO Wales summit it was decided that Czech Army will form third ground combat unit. The 43rd Battalion was chosen to be transformed to Regiment and fulfill the role of national immediate reaction force.

On symbolic date for the unit, 1 October 2020, the 43rd Airborne Regiment was formally activated. Former commander of the 43rd Battalion, Colonel Róbert Dziak became the first commander of the Regiment.

== Structure ==
43rd Airborne Regiment uses a unique structure based on "Commando" units that are stronger than the old airborne companies but smaller than battalions, and several centers for support units. When fully staffed in 2026 it will consist of 1300 soldiers. The following elements are part of the regiment in 2023.

- Regimental HHC
- 1st Commando Company
- 2nd Commando Company
- 3rd Commando Company
- 4th Commando Company
- 5th Commando Company (Active Reserve)
- Weapons Center
- Combat Support Center
- Logistic Support Center
- Command Support Center
- Airborne Training Center
- Combat Training Center
- Medical Detachment
