= Mastula Namatovu =

Ugandan advocate

- Born: November 28, 1988
- Citizenship: Uganda
- Education: Makerere University (BA Commerce)
- Occupation: Politician
- Political party: National Resistance Movement

Mastula Namatovu (born 29 November 1988), also known as Ekiduma Kito, is a Ugandan advocate for the girl child, politician who served as the vice chairperson of Kamuli District Women's League. She was chosen to second Museveni's nomination as NRM's presidential candidate for the 2026 general elections.

== Early life and education ==
Namatovu began her education at Kamuli Girls School. She continued at Nabisunsa Girls Secondary School for her O-level, where she held positions as both dormitory and school prefect. She completed her A-level studies at Busoga High School and later earned a Bachelor of Commerce from Makerere University. At university, she served as Gender Minister (2009–2010) and as a Guild Representative Council member (2010–2011).

== Career ==
Namatovu is a politician affiliated with the National Resistance Movement, and was the party's flagbearer for the Kamuli Municipality parliamentary seat in the 2026 general elections. She served three terms as vice chairperson of the Kamuli District Women's League and is a former publicity secretary of the National Youth Council. Namatovu played a key role in developing the National Women's Council Strategic Plan (2021–2025) and led efforts to mobilize women for participation in the 2021 general elections.

Namatovu has represented Uganda in various international forums, which include Leadership and Gender Equality Training in Zimbabwe (2014), the Commonwealth Youth Forum in Sri Lanka (2013), the Nile Basin Conference in Egypt (2012), and an Agricultural Study Tour in Nairobi, Kenya.
