= People Power, Our Power =

Resistance pressure group in Uganda

The People Power, Our Power movement (also known as the People Power Movement) is a resistance pressure group in Uganda. It is led by Robert Kyagulanyi Ssentamu, also known as Bobi Wine, who was the MP for Kyadondo East constituency. The movement seeks to unite Ugandans on issues such as ending human rights abuse, corruption and redefining the rule of law, with a focus on young Ugandans. The movement was primarily sparked by civil unrest with Yoweri Museveni's extended presidency, after he announced plans to extend his third-longest tenure in Africa by seeking re-election in 2021.

== Origin and foundation ==
=== Taking a stand ===
People Power, Our Power first entered the international spotlight in 2017, when singer and social influencer Robert Kyagulanyi Ssentamu (otherwise known as Bobi Wine) announced his candidacy for the Kyadondo East seat of the Ugandan parliament.

After the main opposition to the ruling Democratic Party (DP), the Forum for Democratic Change (FDC), declined Kyagulanyi's application to run on their ticket, he ran as an independent candidate. Kyagulanyi went on to defeat both parties in the by-election, receiving more than four times the total votes of his NRM opponent.

Kyagulanyi had begun including political messages in his music even before he ran for election, voicing his thoughts on the upcoming 2016 election through his song Situka:

When our leaders have become misleaders and mentors have become tormentors, when freedom of expression becomes the target of oppression, opposition becomes our position.

=== The Museveni Amendment ===
After the contested election of 2016, President Museveni began to lay the foundations for a 2021 run early. A bill crafted by an aligned legislator and intending to extend the presidential term limit was brought to the floor in October 2017. This led to the Ugandan Constitution being amended after an overwhelming 315-62 vote.

The unrest with the bill first became visible within the parliament itself. In December, violence broke out on the parliament floor during debates over the amendment and its provisions. This led to NRM security forces being deployed to detain the lawmakers involved, and six opposition legislators were arrested and suspended from parliament.

The Uganda Communications Commission (UCC) officially banned all live broadcasts of the debates over the amendment abolishing presidential term limits.

Museveni, 73 at the time of the vote, is now officially eligible to run in 2021 and beyond, as any term limits pertaining to age were wiped from the original constitution. The amendment has faced and withstood many appeals battles since its establishment, and at least six opposition lawmakers remain in legal battles over the term limit issue. Appeals have alleged that bribery was used to help the bill pass through parliament, and that the soldiers' removal of lawmakers from the chamber during debates constituted a violation of freedom of speech.

== Structure and organization ==
Key players of the movement have not shied away from criticism that the movement lacks structure and policy goals. Without a hierarchy or policy portfolio, People Power seeks to unite citizens on current issues rather than on a specific partisan policy, thus making it akin to a populist, big tent, or syncretic anti-corruption movement.

Kyagulanyi, as well as other movement members, have an open stance within People Power:

People Power is not a political party or political organization for that matter. We're aware that the state is so scared of the people who come together regardless of their political affiliations, regardless of tribe or religion but people who envision an idea of having power back in their hands. And I want to emphasize that every Ugandan has an equal stake in the idea of people power.

Kyagulanyi has flipped the script of his celebrity status while mobilizing People Power, referring back to his upbringing within Kampala's slums. By relating to the average Ugandan, he believes People Power can transcend the need for a figurehead in Ugandan politics, using a system built to outlast Kyagulanyi himself.

Speculation has suggested that the NRM's close surveillance of opposition activity is part of the reason for the lack of structure within the movement. In response to the government's rumored plan to require formal registration of the movement as a political party, Kyagulanyi again reminded the government that the movement was continuing to accept members from all parties.

Despite People Power, Our Power's ability to mobilize, many critics insist that they need to enter the political sphere properly if they plan to seek the presidency in 2021. A stronger political message, more organization along the campaign trail, and stronger outreach beyond the Ugandan youth are among the list of improvements which the movement's structure may need.

== Momentum in Uganda ==
=== Political support ===
By 2018, just one year after Kyagulanyi was elected as an MP, People Power had gained significant political momentum elsewhere in the country. In the Jinja, Bugiri, and Arua municipalities, the People Power-pioneer endorsed candidates in opposition to the NRM with one hundred percent success. It is noteworthy that the candidates endorsed were aligned with various different opposition parties, consistent with the movement's message of openness to all opposition figures.

Asuman Basalirwa of the Justice Forum, who was elected MP of the Bugiri municipality with Kyagulanyi's endorsement, credited Kyagulanyi with being a changemaker who used demographics to his advantage in ways completely new to Ugandan politics.

While FDC leadership, such as former presidential candidate Kizza Besigye, and People Power have not joined forces in the political sphere often, individual FDC politicians, such as Makindye East MP Ibrahim Kasozi, have put their own spin on the movement's message of accountability for the people.

=== Youth involvement ===
Professor Sabiti Makara, a lecturer of political science and public administration at Makerere University in Uganda, sees more of a policy focus within the movement than many of its critics. "They speak to the aspirations of the voters in 2021; it shows that the issues will be employment and not NRM transitional politics as has been the case in recent elections."

The fact that Ugandans under 30 years of age comprise almost 80 percent of the country's population contributes significantly to the effectiveness of People Power's youth focus. Although this age group consists of some who are old enough to vote and some who are not, People Power seeks to begin youth activism at all ages.

With Museveni in power since 1986, People Power aims to unite those who feel out of touch with plans for Uganda's future. Political analyst Robert Kirunda believes that the excitement surrounding People Power and the possibility of new leadership comes from citizens' desire to relate to their lawmakers.

There are many young people who are not interested in the historical struggle that brought NRM to power, nor with the radical defiance of the main opposition (FDC). Most of them want jobs and they feel the economy is not working for them.

When Museveni came to power in 1986, about 65 percent of the current Ugandan population had not been born. Now, the People Power movement hopes Kyagulanyi can challenge his extended presidency with a 2021 run.

=== Role of social media ===
With a focus on youth participation, People Power has implemented a social media strategy as a main source of their organization. In response to the movement's social media activism, Museveni put forth a social media tax to be implemented on platforms such as WhatsApp, Facebook and Twitter. While many saw this legislation as a direct attack on Kyagulanyi and the People Power movement, Museveni claimed it was intended to end "gossip' that could harm public discourse.

The blackout came at the start of the February 2016 presidential and parliamentary elections, and was reaffirmed as a security measure by the Ugandan Communications Commission, who also added that the matter was referred to them by Uganda's Electoral Commission. As a response to the possibility of such blackouts, Kyagulanyi and other Ugandan resistance influencers have promoted the use of VPNs as a response to government censorship in order to keep up with the continued eloquent political engagements and dissemination of many views.

=== Role of music ===
==== Messages ====
Aside from Kyagulanyi's aforementioned Situka single, which was developed into a socially charged film, politically charged messages have been promoted through his music since the start of his career, long before the formation of People Power. His 2007 song Ghetto spoke about his upbringing in Kampala and advocated for the better treatment of Ugandan slums.

Kyagulanyi believes his medium of music allowed him to stay under government radar for quite some time, by avoiding direct political discourse:

I never really got into trouble with Museveni, because for a long time there was a disconnect between the common people and the elite...I was not important to them, and that was advantageous for me.

Kyagulanyi's political rhetoric within music did not stop as he gained a seat in the parliament, and he released Freedom in 2017. The self-proclaimed "Ghetto President" addressed Museveni directly, advocating for an end to corruption, high unemployment, and free speech violations in Uganda. After going viral in Uganda and abroad, the Uganda Communications Commission banned the song less than a month after its release. While this action was not performed on all of Kyagulanyi's politically-charged music, it was not the first time the UCC took action against him with a ban.

==== Breaking the trend ====
In an era when other Ugandan artists and musicians have seemingly endorsed President Museveni's rule through music, Kyagulanyi has changed the rhetoric as Bobi Wine. As a song titled Tubonga Naawe (We are with you) gained traction throughout Uganda in support of Museveni, Kyagulanyi chose that moment to release his single Dembe (Peace). In this song, he continued to encourage opposition towards Museveni, citing his political greed in altering the Ugandan constitution in order to extend his presidency.

== Opposition and NRM dealings ==
=== Arua elections ===
As they gained momentum in social and political spheres, Kyagulanyi and other People Power protesters have faced problems with gaining a larger platform in opposition to the NRM. In August 2018, he and approximately 30 other opposition lawmakers were arrested while on the campaign trail alongside Kassiano Wadri in Arua, Uganda. Although they were initially charged with illegal firearms possession, these charges were eventually dropped and replaced with a charge of treason.

The charges stemmed from an accusation that Kyagulanyi's group had been stoning the nearby motorcade of President Museveni, who was also participating in campaign activities for the NRM that day. People Power has denied any involvement in the stoning, and it came into question whether Museveni was still in Arua at the time of the alleged harassment.

While still denying any involvement with the incident, Kyagulanyi claims his driver in Arua was shot and killed by NRM security forces set out to capture Kyagulanyi himself, as he was arrested in a raid of his hotel soon after.

Human Rights Watch released a full statement after the events of the Arua election, discussing the implications of mass public arrests of opposition lawmakers and journalists.

=== Treatment in the USA ===
Kyagulanyi spoke of the human rights abuse against himself and his co-defendants while jailed, and was allowed to seek treatment on bail in the United States, where he spent time recovering and speaking to the international press about his concerns for Uganda. His lawyer sought action from the United States, drawing attention to the Ugandan government's reliance on Washington:

"We call upon the U.S. to immediately suspend military funding to Uganda and launch an investigation into the use of military equipment to torture Ugandans."

Museveni has publicly attacked Kyagulanyi's plans and calls for change in Uganda, referring to him only as a "weed-smoking hooligan" from the slums of Kampala.

=== Return to Uganda ===
As Kyagulanyi returned from the United States with plans to mobilize People Power immediately, NRM security forces prepared for the events. After thousands of extra forces were deployed across the country, especially in Kyagulanyi's municipality, four of his concerts were cancelled by the government.
