= Indonesian Army =

- Tentara Nasional Indonesia Angkatan Darat; TNI-AD
- Insignia of Indonesian Army
- Founded: 5 October 1945; 81 years ago (in current form) 3 October 1943; 83 years ago as Pembela Tanah Air (Defenders of the Homeland)
- Country: Indonesia
- Type: Army
- Role: Land warfare; To uphold state sovereignty and defend the territorial integrity of the Republic of Indonesia
- Size: 300,400
- Part of: Indonesian National Armed Forces
- Headquarters: Gambir, Jakarta
- Mottos: Kartika Eka Paksi (Sanskrit, lit. 'Unmatchable Bird with One Noble Goal')
- Colours: Army green
- March: Mars Kartika Eka Paksi
- Anniversaries: 15 December (Hari Juang Kartika, Commemorate the Battle of Ambarawa Day.)
- Engagements: Indonesian National Revolution; Madiun Affair; APRA coup d'état; Makassar Uprising; Invasion of Ambon; Operation Trikora; Darul Islam Rebellion; Indonesia–Malaysia confrontation; East Timor Invasion; Counter-insurgency in Aceh; Counter-insurgency in Maluku; Papua conflict; Cross border attacks in Sabah; Operation Madago Raya; Operation Cartenz's Peace; War on terror in Indonesia
- Website: www.tniad.mil.id

Commanders
- Commander-in-Chief of the Armed Forces: President Prabowo Subianto
- Chief of Staff of the Army: General Tandyo Budi Revita
- Deputy Chief of Staff of the Army: Lieutenant General Tri Budi Utomo
- Inspector General of the Army: Lieutenant General Erwin Djatniko
- Coordinator of the Army Advisory Staff: Lieutenant General Muhammad Zamroni

Insignia
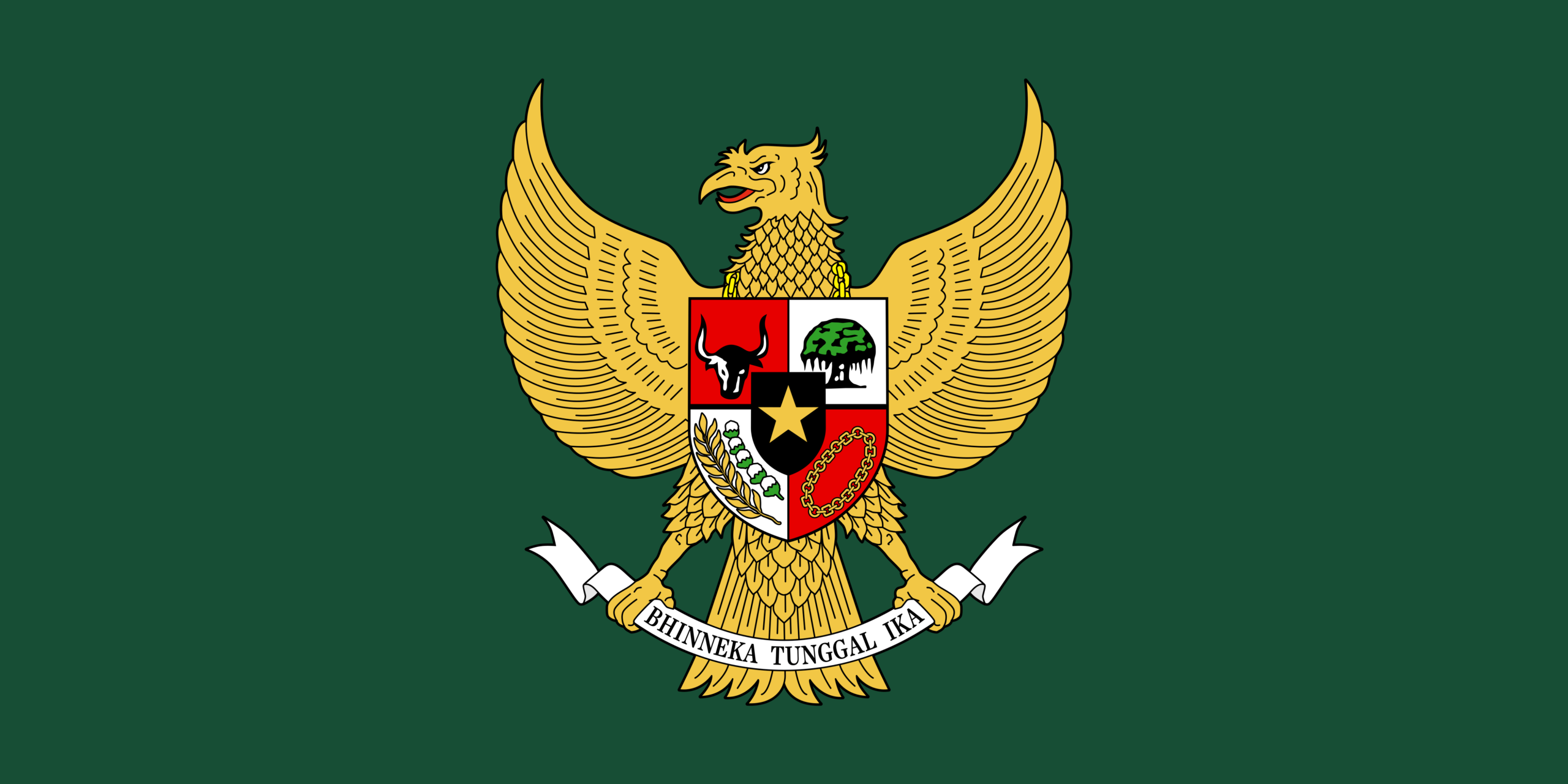
- Flag: Reverse

- Army aviation roundel

- Ensign & fin flash

- Wordmark

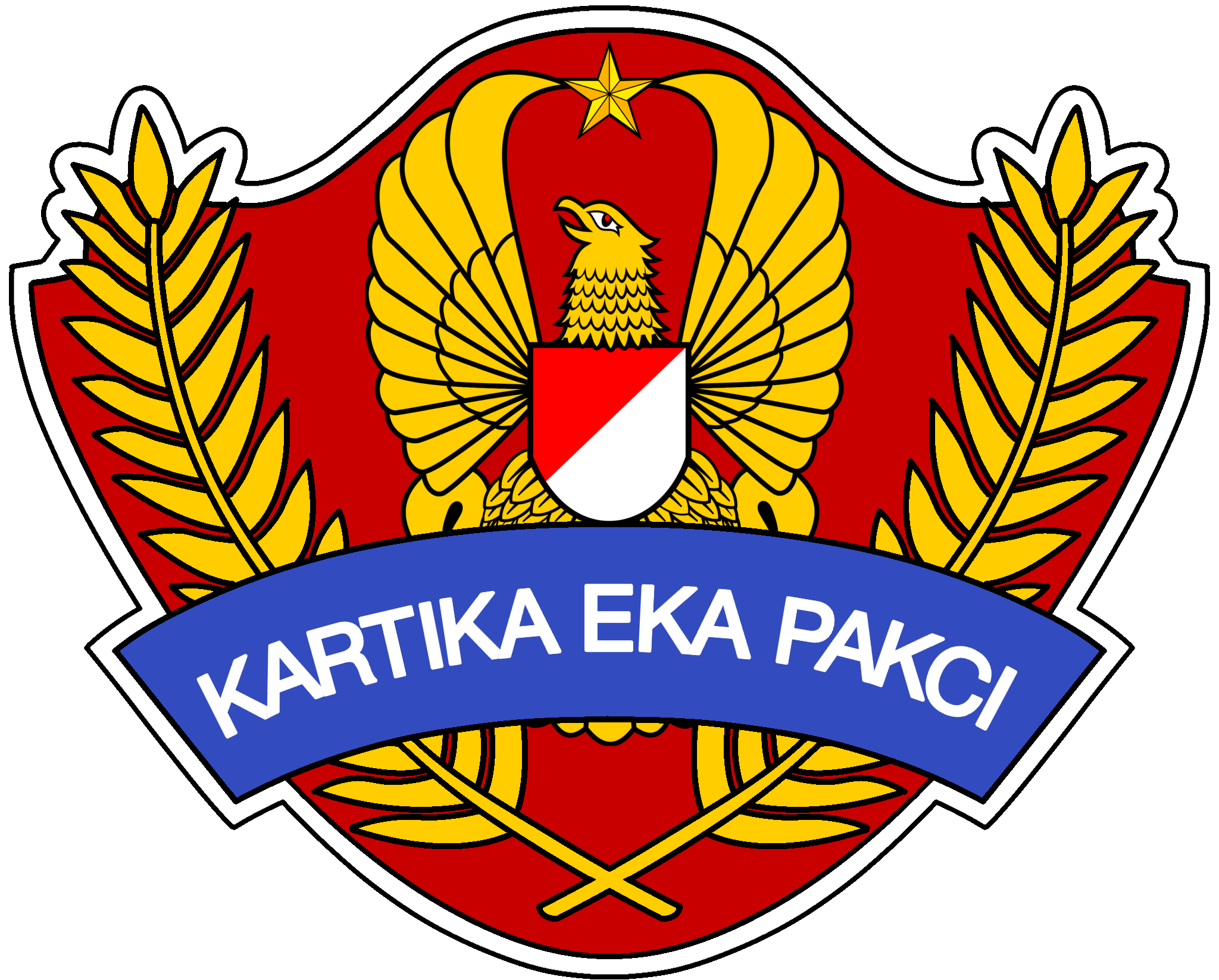
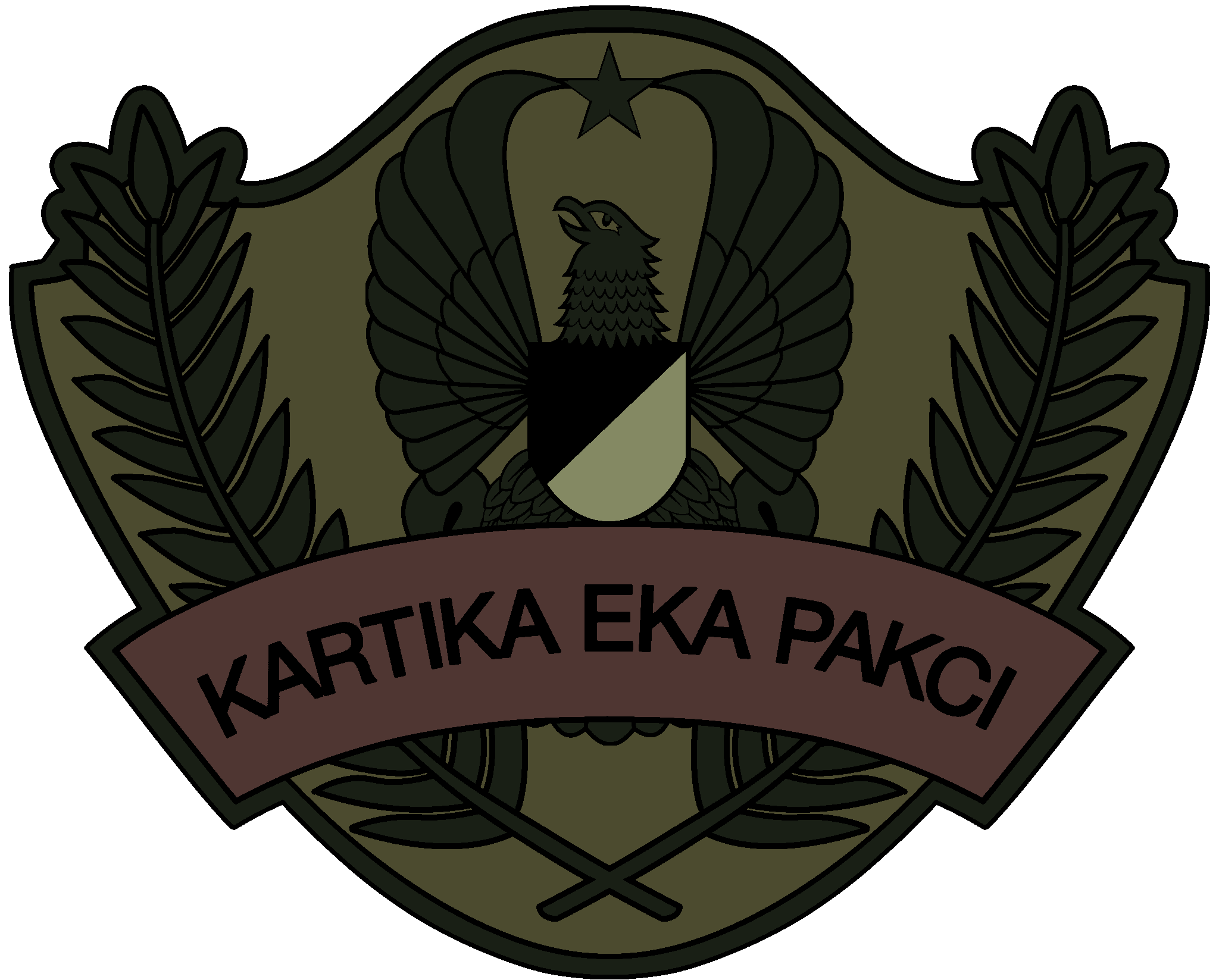
- Headquarters insignia

The Indonesian Army (Indonesian: Tentara Nasional Indonesia Angkatan Darat (TNI-AD), lit. 'Indonesian National Military Land Force') is the land branch of the Indonesian National Armed Forces. It has an estimated strength of 300,400 active personnel. The history of the Indonesian Army has its roots in 1945 when the Tentara Keamanan Rakyat (TKR) "People's Security Army" first emerged as a paramilitary and police corps.

Since the nation's independence movement, the Indonesian Army has been involved in multifaceted operations ranging from the incorporation of Western New Guinea, the Indonesia–Malaysia confrontation, to the annexation of East Timor, as well as internal counter-insurgency operations in Aceh, Maluku, and Papua. The army's operations have not been without controversy; it has been periodically associated with human rights violations, particularly in West Papua, East Timor, and Aceh.

The Indonesia Army is composed of a headquarters, 21 military regional command (Kodam), a strategic reserve command (Kostrad), a special forces command (Kopassus), and various adjunct units. It is headed by the Chief of Staff of the Army (Kepala Staf Angkatan Darat – KSAD or KASAD).

== History ==
=== Formation ===
In the week following the Japanese surrender of 1945, the Giyūgun (PETA) and Heiho groups were disbanded by the Japanese. Most PETA and Heiho members did not yet know about the declaration of independence. Command structures and membership vital for a national army were consequently dismantled. Thus, rather than being formed from a trained, armed, and organised army, the Republican armed forces began to grow in early October from usually younger, less trained groups under the national People's Security Agency built around charismatic leaders in the regions. Creating a rational military structure that was obedient to central authority from such disorganisation, was one of the major problems of the revolution, a problem that remains through to contemporary times. In a meeting between former KNIL and former PETA Division Commanders, organised by chief of staff (KSO) of People's Security Agency, Oerip Soemohardjo, a thirty-year-old former school teacher and PETA member, Sudirman, was elected 'commander-in-chief' in Yogyakarta on 12 November 1945. Under his leadership, the young Army began to fight as a unified force during the National Revolution.

Aware of the limitations of their military in the face of the Dutch aggression, the people and government of Indonesia decided to fight foreign threats to the nation's independence. Thus, in 1947, the People's War Doctrine in which all the power of the national armed forces and the community and resources were deployed to confront the Dutch aggression, was officially implemented within the army and the wider armed forces as the national military strategy. Thus, the integrity and existence of the Unitary Republic of Indonesia has been able to be maintained by military forces with the people. By 1947, the young Army (then named Tentara Republik Indonesia Angkatan Darat) was organized into 10 infantry divisions, 7 Javanese and 3 Sumatran.

In accordance with the decision of the Round Table Conference (RTC), at the end of 1949 the United States of Indonesia (RIS) came into being. Correspondingly, the TNI's ground forces thus formed part of the Angkatan Perang Republik Indonesia Serikat (APRIS) (later the Angkatan Perang Republik Indonesia or APRI when the republic became unitary in 1950). It would be the formal merger of the TNI and the former KNIL and all military personnel of the two forces, plus the independent paramilitary groups (laskar) which fought the war on the side of the independence movement.

=== Action against rebellions ===
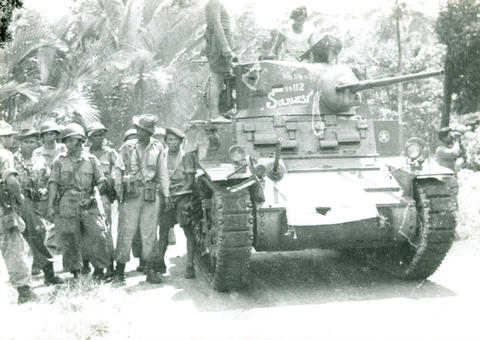
Indonesian army M3 Stuart tank patrolling in Ambon during Republic of South Maluku rebellion, 1950

The period is also called the period of liberal democracy is characterized by various rebellions in the country. In 1950 most of the former members of the Colonial Army launched an uprising in Bandung which is known as the Legion of the Just Ruler / APRA uprising and was led by former KNIL officer Raymond Westerling. The army also needed to confront the uprising in Makassar led by Andi Azis and the Republic of South Maluku (RMS) in Maluku. Meanwhile, DaruI Islam in West Java widened its influence to South Kalimantan, South Sulawesi and Aceh. In 1958 the Revolutionary Government of the Republic of Indonesia / People's Struggle (PRRI / Permesta) started a rebellion in large parts of Sumatra and North Sulawesi endangering the national integrity. As part of the National Armed Forces the Army helped defeat all these uprisings, increasing its prestige in the eyes of the government and the people. Future Chief of Staff of the Army Ahmad Yani was instrumental in one of these first victories against rebels in Central Java.

On 17 November 1952, General Nasution was suspended as army chief of staff following army indiscipline over command and support that threatens the government. From the 1950s, the military articulated the doctrines of dwifungsi and hankamrata, the military roles in the country's socio-political development as well as security; and a requirement that the resources of the people be at the call of the armed forces and police if the State warrants it. On 5 July 1959, Sukarno, with armed forces support and the advice of Nasution, issued a decree dissolving the Constituent Assembly and reintroducing the Constitution of 1945 with strong presidential powers. By 1963, he also assumed the additional role of Prime Minister, which completed the structure of 'Guided Democracy', and was named "President for Life", also with army assistance, the year after.

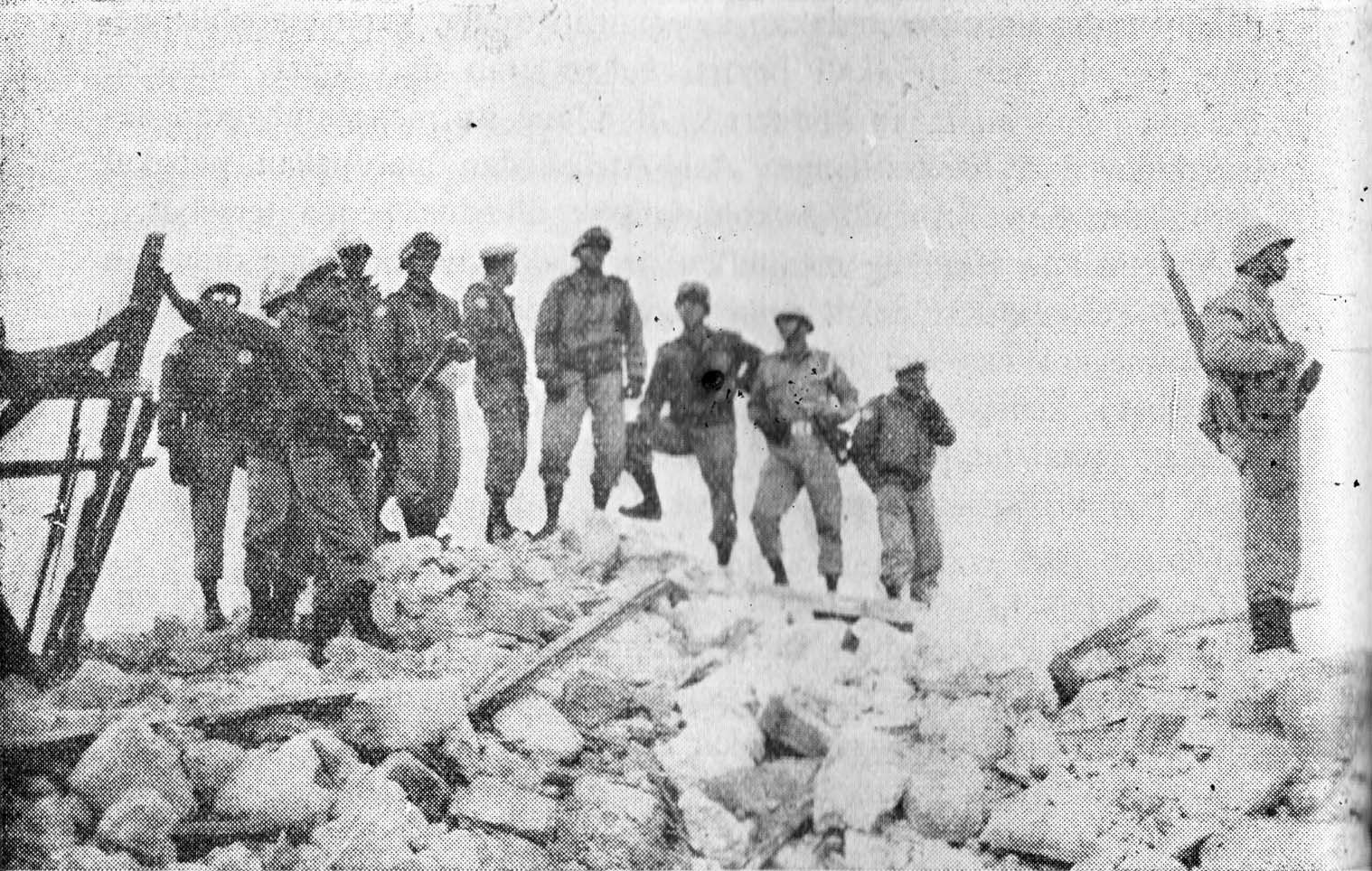
Indonesian soldiers in Sinai, 1957. They were part of the Garuda Contingent under the UNEF.

At the same time, the Indonesian government started sending their troops on UN peacekeeping missions. The first batch of soldiers were sent to Sinai, Egypt, and were known as Garuda Contingent I. Garuda Contingent I began its first deployment 8 January 1957 to Egypt. Garuda Contingent I consisted of the combined personnel of the 15th Infantry Regiment Territorial Command (TT) IV/Diponegoro, as well as one company of the 18th Infantry Regiment TC V/Brawijaya in Malang. This contingent was led by Lt. Col. of Infantry Hartoyo which was later replaced by Lieutenant Colonel of Infantry Suadi Suromihardjo, while his deputy was Major of Infantry Soediono Suryantoro. The contingent departed on 8 January 1957, on board the Douglas C-124 Globemaster II transport aircraft of the United States Air Force for Beirut, the Lebanese capital. From Beirut the contingent was divided by two, the majority heading to Abu Suweir and partly to Al Sandhira. Furthermore, the El Sandhira troops moved into Gaza, the border area of Egypt and Israel, while the command is in Rafah. This contingent returned to Indonesia on 29 September 1957. Garuda Contingent I had a total number of 559 army personnel of all ranks.

=== 1965 to 1998 ===
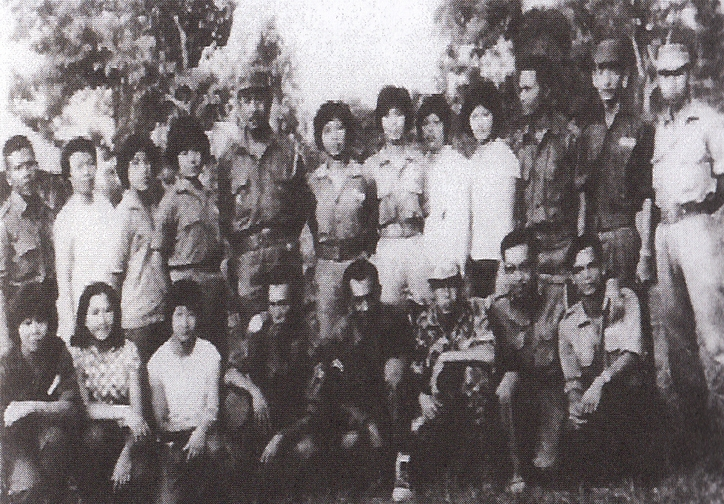
Members of the Sarawak People's Guerilla Force (SPGF), North Kalimantan National Army (NKNA) and the Indonesian Army (TNI-AD) during the Indonesia–Malaysia confrontation

The army was heavily involved in the Indonesian killings of 1965–1966. The killings were an anti-communist purge following a failed coup of the 30 September Movement. The most widely accepted estimates are that more than 500,000 people were killed. The purge was a pivotal event in the transition to the "New Order"; the Indonesian Communist Party (PKI) was eliminated as a political force. The failed coup released pent-up communal hatreds which were fanned by the Indonesian Army, which quickly blamed the PKI. Communists were purged from political, social, and military life, and the PKI itself was banned. The massacres began in October 1965, in the weeks following the coup attempt, and reached their peak over the remainder of the year before subsiding in the early months of 1966. They started in the capital, Jakarta, and spread to Central and East Java and, later, Bali. Thousands of local vigilantes and army units killed actual and alleged PKI members. Although killings occurred across Indonesia, the worst were in the PKI strongholds of Central Java, East Java, Bali, and northern Sumatra. It is possible that over one million people were imprisoned at one time or another.

Sukarno's balancing act of "Nasakom" (nationalism, religion and communism) had been unravelled. His most significant pillar of support, the PKI, had been effectively eliminated by the other two pillars—the army and political Islam; and the army was on the way to unchallenged power. In March 1968, Suharto was formally elected president.

The killings are skipped over in most Indonesian history books and have received little introspection by Indonesians and comparatively little international attention. Satisfactory explanations for the scale and frenzy of the violence have challenged scholars from all ideological perspectives. The possibility of a return to similar upheavals is cited as a factor in the "New Order" administration's political conservatism and tight control of the political system. Vigilance against a perceived communist threat remained a hallmark of Suharto's thirty-year presidency. The CIA described the massacre as "one of the worst mass murders of the 20th century, along with the Soviet purges of the 1930s, the Nazi mass murders during the Second World War, and the Maoist bloodbath of the early 1950s." Later army operations have not been without controversy however.

The size of the Army has expanded over the years; in July 1976 the Army was estimated to consist of solely 180,000 personnel, one armoured cavalry brigade, part of Kostrad (one tank battalion, plus support units), 14 infantry brigades (90 infantry, 1 para, 9 artillery, 11 anti-aircraft, and 9 engineer battalions) of which three of the brigades were in Kostrad, two airborne brigades totalling six battalions, also part of Kostrad, one independent tank battalion, 7 independent armoured cavalry battalions, and four independent para-commando battalions.

=== 1998–present ===
Involvement in UN Peacekeeping operations continued after the fall of Suharto, but in 2010, the United Nations Interim Force in Lebanon was strongly criticized after two soldiers from Indonesia were filmed fleeing a clash on the Israeli-Lebanon border in a taxi.

Starting in 2025, the Army embarked on an expansion program, with the Ministry of Defense aiming at the formation of 150 new battalions per year with the stated aim of one territorial development battalion per regency/city and one Kodam for each province.

== Organisation ==
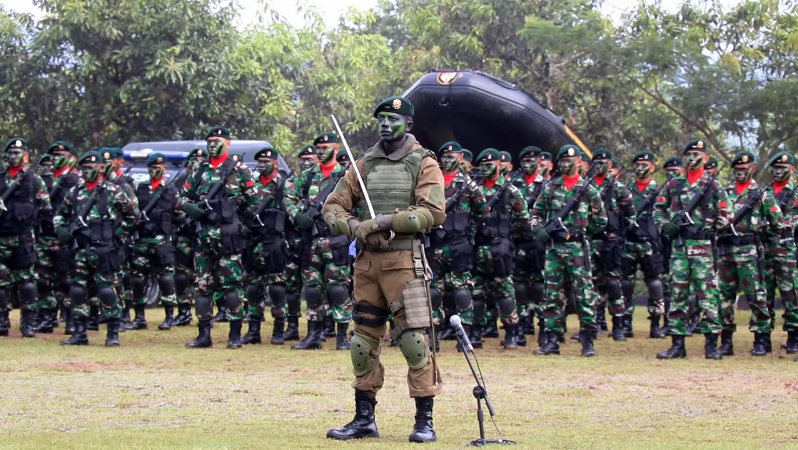
Indonesian Army Infantry soldiers from Kostrad and Raider Infantry during a ceremony

Territorially, the Indonesian Army is currently organized into 21 military regions which are spread throughout the Indonesian archipelago. They are placed under the jurisdiction of the army headquarters. Six are based in Sumatra, four are based in Java, three are based in Kalimantan, one based in Lesser Sunda Islands, three based in Sulawesi, one based in Maluku and three based in Papua. The Komando Cadangan Strategis Angkatan Darat (Kostrad, strategic reserve forces) and Komando Pasukan Khusus (Kopassus, the Army special force) are independent formations and directly subordinate to the chief of staff. The army headquarters is under coordination with the armed force Headquarters. The highest-ranking officer within the army is the Chief of Staff of the Army which has the rank of a four-star General and is responsible to the Commander of the Armed Forces.

The Indonesian Army and its relation to the Armed Forces General Headquarters and the other military branches are structured into the following in accordance with the provisions of Presidential Regulation No. 84/2025 on the Organization of the Indonesian National Armed Forces:

=== Leadership elements (Unsur pimpinan) ===
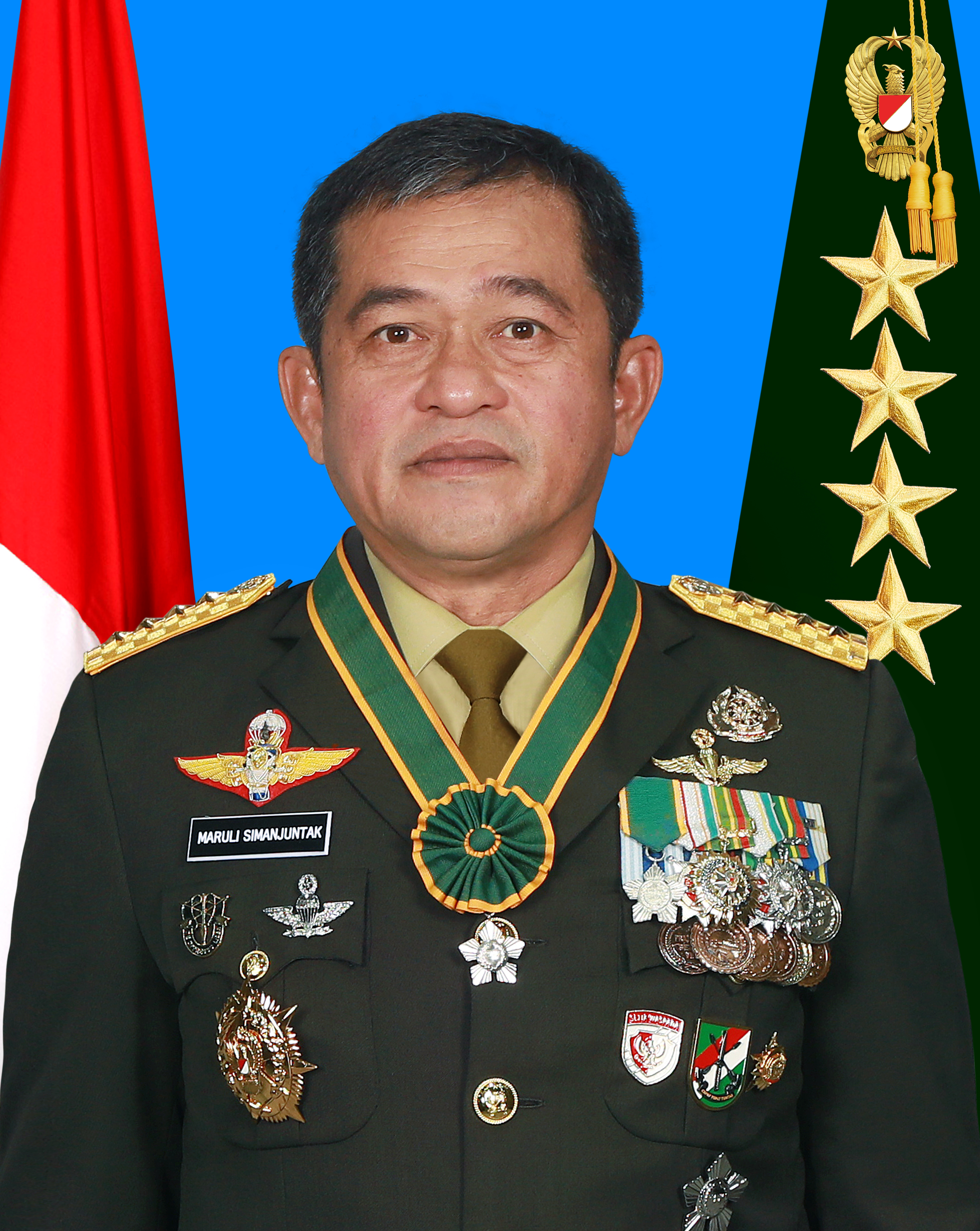
1. The current Chief of Staff of the Army, General Maruli Simanjuntak
  Chief of Staff of the Army (Kepala Staf Angkatan Darat), in charge of:
  - heading the management and operational readiness of the Army;
  - assisting the Commander of the Armed Forces in creating policies regarding the Army's image, doctrine, and strategy, as well as in preparing land-based operations;
  - assisting the Commander of the Armed Forces in utilizing various state defense components; and
  - other land-based duties as ordered by the Commander of the Armed Forces.
2. Deputy Chief of Staff of the Army (Wakil Kepala Staf Angkatan Darat), serving as the chief staff coordinator of the Army Headquarters, assisting the Army Chief of Staff in heading the Army.

=== Leadership support elements (Unsur pembantu pimpinan) ===
1. Inspectorate General of the Army (Inspektorat Jenderal TNI Angkatan Darat), tasked with general internal supervision of the Army, as well as the supervision over the Army's treasury and finance;
2. Expert Staff to the Army Chief of Staff (Staf Ahli Kepala Staf Angkatan Darat), tasked with providing the Army Chief of Staff with academic and scientific analysis over national and international issues;
3. Army Planning and Budgeting Staff (Staf Perencanaan dan Anggaran TNI Angkatan Darat), tasked with drafting strategic policies and general administration of Army planning, budgeting, and bureaucratic reform;
4. Army Intelligence Staff (Staf Intelijen TNI Angkatan Darat), tasked with drafting strategic policies and general administration of Army intelligence;
5. Army Operations Staff (Staf Operasi TNI Angkatan Darat), tasked with drafting strategic policies and general administration of Army operations;
6. Army Personnel Staff (Staf Personalia TNI Angkatan Darat), tasked with drafting strategic policies and general administration of Army personnel;
7. Army Logistics Staff (Staf Logistik TNI Angkatan Darat), tasked with drafting strategic policies and general administration of Army logistics; and
8. Army Territorial Staff (Staf Teritorial TNI Angkatan Darat), tasked with drafting strategic policies and general administration of Army territorial affairs.

=== Service Element (Unsur Pelayanan) ===
- Army Headquarters Detachment (Detasemen Markas Besar TNI Angkatan Darat), in charge of managing the internal affairs, personnel, logistics, and finance in support of the Army Headquarters.

=== Central executive agencies (Badan Pelaksana Pusat) ===
The following agencies are called Badan Pelaksana Pusat, translated as Central Executive Agencies, and directly subordinated under the Army Headquarters. Agencies with affix Pusat (Centers), Akademi (Academies), and Sekolah (Schools or Colleges) are headed by two-star Major General, while agencies with affix Dinas (Services/Departments) and Direktorat (Directorates) are headed by a one-star Brigadier General. Exceptions are made for the Army Territorial Center, Army Military Police Center, and Army Central Hospital as they are all headed by a three-star Lieutenant General.

Centers

- Combat forces
1. Infantry Branch Center (Pusat Kesenjataan Infanteri)
2. Cavalry Branch Center (Pusat Kesenjataan Kavaleri)
3. Field Artillery Branch Center (Pusat Kesenjataan Artileri Medan)
4. Air Defense Artillery Branch Center (Pusat Kesenjataan Artileri Pertahanan Udara)
- Combat and service support
1. Army Military Police Center (Pusat Polisi Militer TNI Angkatan Darat)
2. Army Aviation Center (Pusat Penerbangan TNI Angkatan Darat)
3. Army Medical Center (Pusat Kesehatan TNI Angkatan Darat). It directly oversees Gatot Soebroto Army Central Hospital (Rumah Sakit Pusat Angkatan Darat Gatot Soebroto), while other army hospitals are organized under each regional command's medical center.
4. Army Engineering Center (Pusat Zeni TNI Angkatan Darat)
5. Army Communication and Electronics Center (Pusat Komunikasi dan Elektronika TNI Angkatan Darat)
6. Army Ordnance Center (Pusat Peralatan TNI Angkatan Darat)
7. Army Logistics and Transportation Center (Pusat Pembekalan Angkutan TNI Angkatan Darat)
8. Army Intelligence Center (Pusat Intelijen TNI Angkatan Darat)
9. Army Cipher and Cyber Center (Pusat Sandi dan Siber TNI Angkatan Darat)
10. Army Territorial Center (Pusat Teritorial TNI Angkatan Darat)

Academies and Schools

1. Indonesian Military Academy (Akademi Militer)
2. Army Command and Staff College (Sekolah Staf dan Komando TNI Angkatan Darat)
3. Army Officer Candidate School (Sekolah Calon Perwira TNI Angkatan Darat)

Directorates

1. Army Adjutancy General Directorate (Direktorat Ajudan Jenderal TNI Angkatan Darat)
2. Army Topography Directorate (Direktorat Topografi TNI Angkatan Darat)
3. Army Military Justice Directorate (Direktorat Hukum TNI Angkatan Darat)
4. Army Finance Directorate (Direktorat Keuangan TNI Angkatan Darat)

Services

1. Army Physical Fitness Service (Dinas Jasmani TNI Angkatan Darat)
2. Army Mental Guidance and Chaplaincy Service (Dinas Pembinaan Mental TNI Angkatan Darat)
3. Army Psychology Service (Dinas Psikologi TNI Angkatan Darat)
4. Army Research and Development Service (Dinas Penelitian dan Pengembangan TNI Angkatan Darat)
5. Army Historical Heritage Service (Dinas Sejarah TNI Angkatan Darat)
6. Army Information and Data Processing Service (Dinas Informasi dan Pengolahan Data TNI Angkatan Darat)
7. Army Public Relations Service (Dinas Penerangan TNI Angkatan Darat)
8. Army Worthiness Service (Dinas Kelaikan TNI Angkatan Darat)
9. Army Procurement Service (Dinas Pengadaan TNI Angkatan Darat)
10. Army Personnel Administration Service (Dinas Administrasi Personel TNI Angkatan Darat)

=== Principal Commands under the Army Headquarters ===
==== Army Strategic Reserve Command ====
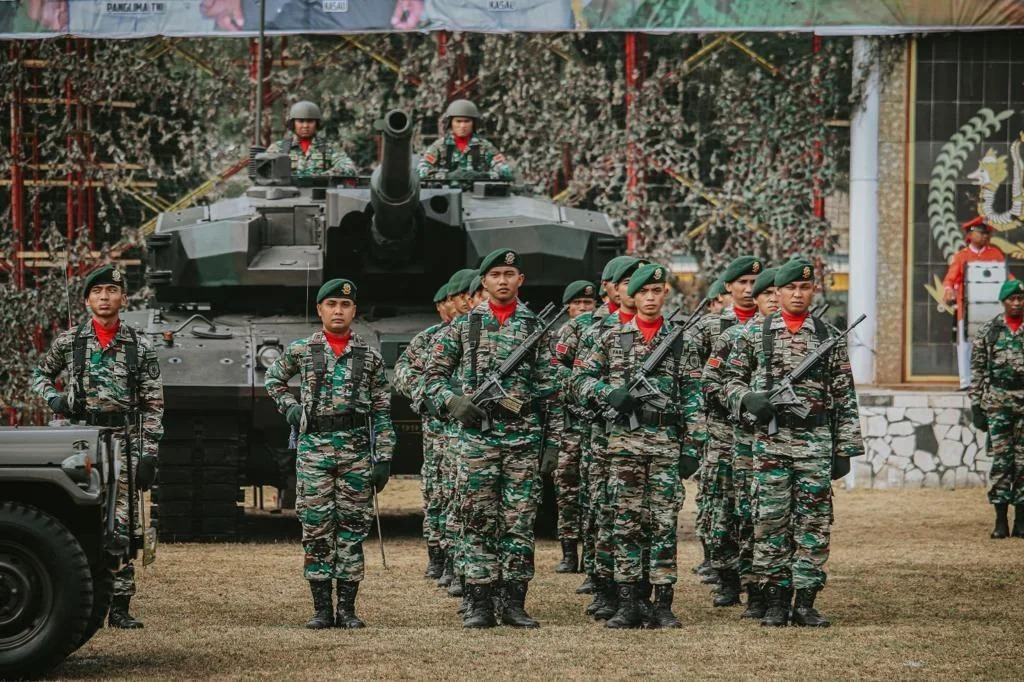
Soldiers from Kostrad

The Army Strategic Reserve Command (Komando Cadangan Strategis Angkatan Darat), better known by its abbreviation Kostrad is the Indonesian Army's strategic operational command. It is a corps-level command which has around 40,000 troops, organized into three divisions. It also supervises operational readiness among all commands and conducts defence and security operations at the strategic level in accordance with policies of the TNI commander. Green berets are worn by its personnel, and it is the main deployable combat force of the army.

While Kopassus is the elite special forces of the Indonesian Army, Kostrad is the premier conventional combat force. It is the main deployable combat force, and includes airborne infantry units. Kostrad contains Infantry (including Airborne) units, Artillery, Cavalry, and other military combat units. The three division's composition and its headquarters are:

Emblems	Official names	Establishment	Headquarters
	1st Infantry Division/Kostrad	December 1965	Cilodong, Depok, West Java
	2nd Infantry Division/Kostrad	April 1961	Singosari, Malang, East Java
	3rd Infantry Division/Kostrad	May 2018	Bontomarannu, Gowa, South Sulawesi

==== Army Doctrine, Education and Training Development Command ====
The Army Doctrine, Education and Training Development Command (Komando Pembinaan Doktrin, Pendidikan, dan Latihan TNI Angkatan Darat, abbreviated into Kodiklatad) is charged in providing training to all officers, warrant officers, NCOs and enlisted personnel of the Army. The Command HQ is based in Bandung, and organized into the following:

- Combat Operations Training Center (Pusat Latihan Tempur TNI Angkatan Darat)
- Combat Simulation Center (Pusat Simulasi Tempur TNI Angkatan Darat)
- Army Branch Training Schools (Pusat Pendidikan Kecabangan TNI Angkatan Darat), which consist of the following Army training schools:
  - Infantry Training Center (Pusat Pendidikan Infanteri)
  - Cavalry Training Center (Pusat Pendidikan Kavaleri)
  - Air Defense Artillery Training Center (Pusat Pendidikan Artileri Pertahanan Udara)
  - Field Artillery Training Center (Pusat Pendidikan Artileri Medan);
  - Women's Army Corps Training Center (Pusat Pendidikan Korps Wanita);
  - Military Finance Training Center (Pusat Pendidikan Keuangan);
  - Physical Fitness Training Center (Pusat Pendidikan Jasmani);
  - Military Police Corps Training Center (Pusat Pendidikan Polisi Militer);
  - Military Signals Training Center (Pusat Pendidikan Perhubungan);
  - Territorial Defense Training Center (Pusat Pendidikan Teritorial);
  - Military Logistics and Transportation Corps Training Center (Pusat Pendidikan Pembekalan dan Angkutan)
  - Military Ordnance Training Center (Pusat Pendidikan Peralatan);
  - Topography Training Center (Pusat Pendidikan Topografi);
  - Military Engineering Training Center (Pusat Pendidikan Zeni);
  - Military Medical Training Center (Pusat Pendidikan Kesehatan)
  - Military Intelligence Training Center (Pusat Pendidikan Intelijen)
  - Adjutancy General Training Center (Pusat Pendidikan Ajudan Jenderal)
  - Military Justice Training Center (Pusat Pendidikan Hukum)
  - General Military Instruction Training Center (Pusat Pendidikan Pengetahuan Militer Umum)
  - Army Aviation Training Center (Pusat Pendidikan Penerbang Angkatan Darat)
  - Army Applied Technology College (Sekolah Tinggi Teknologi Angkatan Darat)
  - Indonesian Army Polytechnic (Politeknik Angkatan Darat)
  - Regional Training Regiments (Resimen Induk Komando Daerah Militer, abbreviated into Rindam) assigned to all territorial Military Regional Commands of the Army

==== Army Special Force Command ====
The Army Special Force Command (Komando Pasukan Khusus) or Kopassus for short, composed of an estimated 5,530 personnel organized into 6 Groups of airborne-qualified commandos, 1 clandestine and intelligence unit, 1 counterterrorism unit, and 1 education and training unit:

- Group 1/Eka Wastu Baladhika, based in Serang
- Group 2/Dwi Dharma Bhirawa Yudha, based in Kartasura
- Group 3/Tri Cipta Mahiswara Yudha, based in East Lampung
- Group 4/Catur Dewandra Balacakti, based in Kutai Kartanegara
- Group 5/Panca Vira Ranasena, based in South Konawe
- Group 6/Sat Gunarsa Mahitala Yudha, based in Mimika
- Sat 77/Adya Kottaman Wira Naraca Byuha, formerly known as Group 3/Sandhi Yudha, based in Depok, specialized in clandestine and intelligence operations
- Sat 81/Gultor, based in Depok, specialized in counterterrorism
- Special Force Education and Training Center/Tri Yudha Cakti (Pusat Pendidikan dan Pelatihan Pasukan Khusus), based in Batujajar, West Bandung, composed of the following education and training units:
  - Commando Training School (Sekolah Komando);
  - Airborne Training School (Sekolah PARA);
  - Combat Intelligence Training School (Sekolah Sandha);
  - Specialization Training School (Sekolah Spesialisasi);
  - Raider Training School (Sekolah Raider); and
  - Special Combat Training School (Sekolah Pertempuran Khusus).

Except for the Special Force Education and Training Center, every Kopassus groups are tasked with maintaining its combat and operational readiness at any given moment. Each group is headed by a Brigadier General and all groups are qualified as airborne commandos. Kopassus is known for its roles in high-risk operations such as the Woyla hijacking and the Mapenduma hostage crisis. However, Kopassus is also known for its alleged human right abuses in East Timor and Papua. Personnel of the unit are distinguished by their red berets, similar to most paratrooper and special forces units in the world.

==== Army territorial commands ====
The Military Area Commands (Komando Daerah Militer, or KODAM) as of 2026

The territorial Military Regional Command or Military Area Command (Komando Daerah Militer) and its units below hierarchically serve as the main operational organization of the Indonesian Army. These military territories were established by General Sudirman (the then-Commander of the Indonesian National Armed Forces), following the model of the Nazi German Wehrkreis system. The system was later codified in Surat Perintah Siasat No. 1, signed into doctrine in November 1948.

The hierarchy of Indonesian Army territorial command is as follows:

- Kodam (Komando Daerah Militer) Military Regional Command or officially known as Military Area Command (Provincial or multiple province level) is commanded by a two-star Major General;
- Korem (Komando Resor Militer) Military Resort Command or officially known as Military Subarea Command (Covering a province or multiple cities and regencies) is further divided into 2 type, A and B, commanded by a one-star Brigadier General and Colonel respectively;
- Kodim (Komando Distrik Militer) Military District Command (City or Regency level) is further divided, into 3 type, independent, A and B, commanded by a Colonel, Lieutenant Colonel, and Major respectively; and
- Koramil (Komando Rayon Militer) Military Rayon Command or officially known as Military Subdistrict Command (Kecamatan or district level) is further divided into 2 type, A and B, commanded by a Major and Captain respectively.

There are currently 27 Kodams in all established across Indonesia, with all but two commands numbered.

1. Kodam I/Bukit Barisan covers North Sumatra
2. Kodam II/ Sriwijaya covers South Sumatra and Bangka-Belitung
3. Kodam III/Siliwangi covers West Java and Banten, except Jakarta metropolitan area
4. Kodam IV/Diponegoro covers parts of Central Java
5. Kodam V/Brawijaya covers East Java
6. Kodam VI/Mulawarman covers much of eastern Kalimantan and areas of National Capital City Nusantara
7. Kodam IX/Udayana covers Bali
8. Kodam XII/Tanjungpura covers West Kalimantan
9. Kodam XIII/Merdeka covers North Sulawesi and Gorontalo
10. Kodam XIV/Hasanuddin covers South Sulawesi and Southeast Sulawesi
11. Kodam XV/Pattimura covers the Moluccas
12. Kodam XVII/Cenderawasih covers Papua and Highlands Papua
13. Kodam XVIII/Kasuari covers West Papua and Southwest Papua
14. Kodam XIX/Tuanku Tambusai covers Riau
15. Kodam XX/Tuanku Imam Bonjol covers West Sumatra and Jambi
16. Kodam XXI/Radin Inten covers Lampung and Bengkulu
17. Kodam XXII/Tambun Bungai covers Central Kalimantan and South Kalimantan
18. Kodam XXIII/Palaka Wira covers Central Sulawesi and West Sulawesi
19. Kodam XXIV/Mandala Trikora covers South Papua
20. Kodam XXV/Sultan Mahmud Riayat Syah covers Riau Islands
21. Kodam XXVI/Mataram covers Yogyakarta and parts of Central Java (Temanggung, Klaten, Wonosobo, Wonogiri, and Purworejo)
22. Kodam XXVII/Sobe Sonbai covers East Nusa Tenggara
23. Kodam XXVIII/Moloku Kie Raha covers North Mollucas
24. Kodam XXIX/Mambruk covers Central Papua
25. Kodam XXX/Sinambora covers West Nusa Tenggara
26. Kodam Jaya Jayakarta covers Jakarta metropolitan area (Jakarta proper, Greater Tangerang in Banten, as well as Depok and Bekasi in West Java)
27. Kodam Iskandar Muda covers Aceh

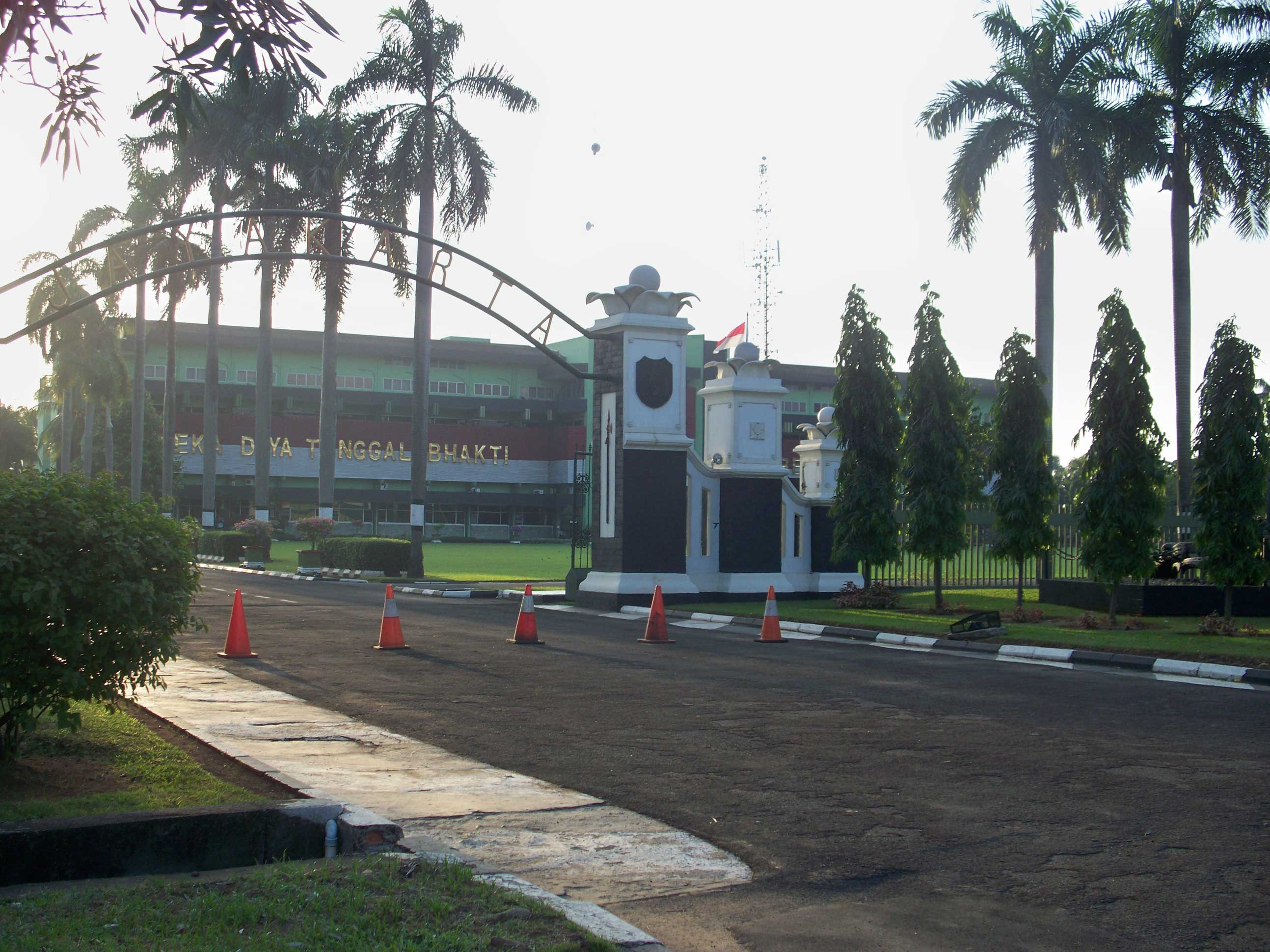
Jayakarta Military Area Command headquarters

The Army's structure underwent various reorganizations throughout its early years. From 1946 to 1952 the Army was organized into a number of set combined arms divisions, dominated by infantry brigades. These were further consolidated in 1951, and then dispersed in 1952. From 1952 to 1958–59, the Army was organized into seven Territorial Armies (Tentara & Teritorium) composed of regiments and independent formations in the battalion level and below. In August 1958, the Indonesian Army reconsolidated its territorial organization. There were then established sixteen regional commands, which retained earlier divisional titles; the Siliwangi Division, for example, became Kodam VI/Siliwangi. The RCs, then as in today, were subdivided administratively into Areas (the former territorial regiments), Districts (the former regimental battalions) and District Sectors, and operationally composed of a number of specialty battalions and in some regional commands, an infantry brigade.

A reorganisation in 1985 made significant changes in the army chain of command. The four multiservice Defence Region Commands (Kowilhans) and the National Strategy Command (Kostranas) were eliminated from the defence structure, re-establishing the Military Regional Command (Kodam) as the key organisation for strategic, tactical, and territorial operations for all services. The chain of command flowed directly from the ABRI commander in chief via the Chief of Staff of the Army to the ten territorial commands' commanders, and then to subordinate army territorial commands.

The territorial commands incorporate provincial and district commands each with a number of infantry battalions, sometimes a cavalry battalion, artillery, or engineers, and there are an increasing number of infantry brigades being activated. Some have Raider battalions attached either under divisional control, under brigades, or as territorial infantry.

== Army Branches/Corps ==
=== Combat Elements (Satuan Tempur) ===
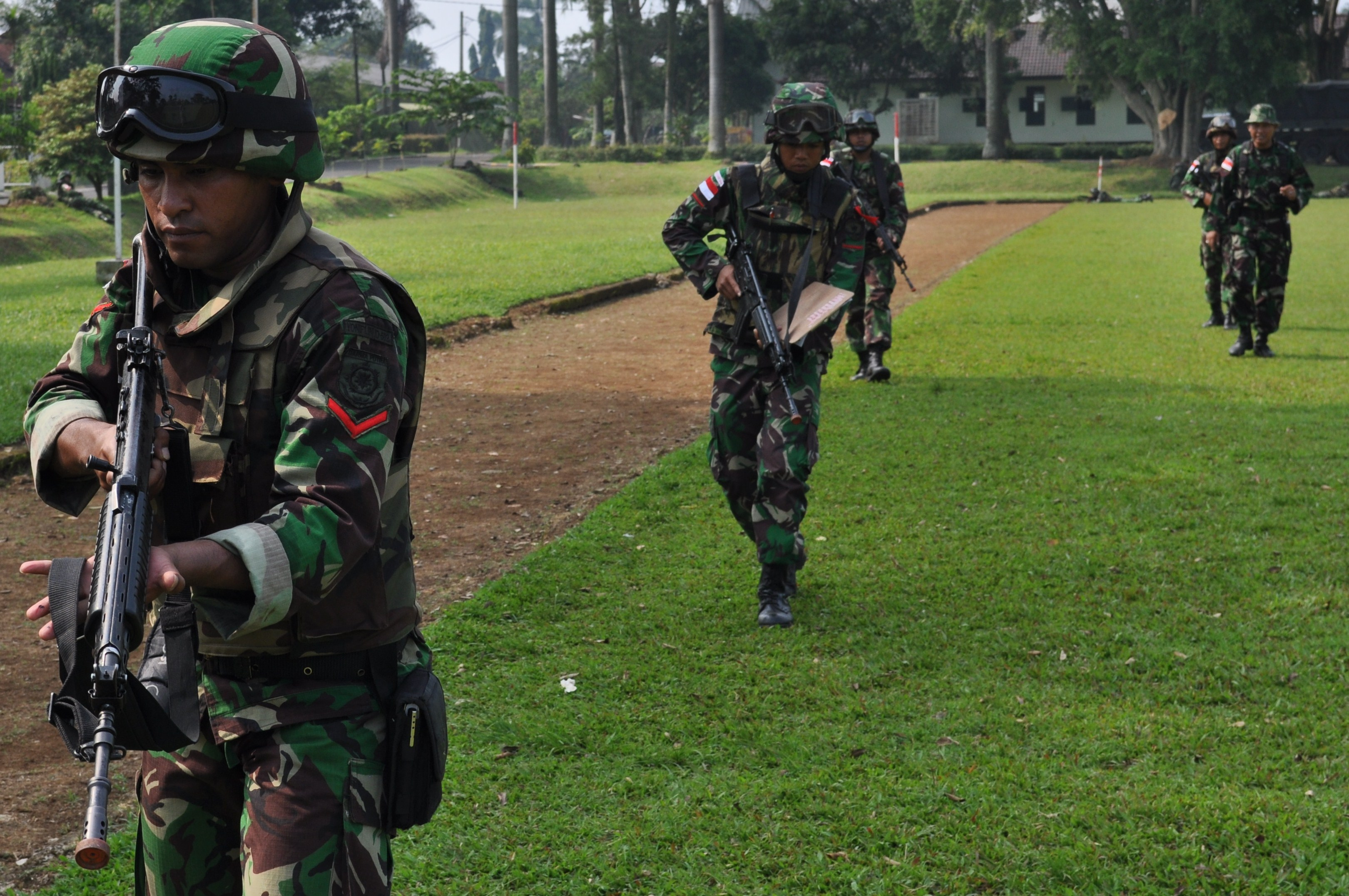
Indonesian Army Infantry Soldiers during training

- Infantry branch (INF; Indonesian: Infanteri) – The Infantry Branch is the principal and major unit of the Indonesian army combat element. The Infantry element is the largest and main combat troops within the Indonesian army. Most members of Kostrad and Kopassus are composed of infantrymen, although it also consists of non-infantry units internally. In Indonesia, there are more than 100 Infantry Battalions spread throughout the country. Green berets are worn by Indonesian Army infantrymen. The Infantry Branch of the Indonesian Army are under the auspices of the Infantry Branch Center (Pusat Kesenjataan Infanteri) which is under the command of a lieutenant general. The Infantry branch of the Indonesian Army consists of huge numbers of units whereas the International Institute for Strategic Studies' Military Balance 2007 lists the Army with 2 brigades, (6 battalions), plus 60 other battalions in each Kodams and nine battalions in Kostrad. The elite infantry battalions of the Indonesian Army are called "Raider Battalions" (raised in 2003) which are specially trained in Raid and Air assault operations (including counter-terrorism, Extraction, Guerrilla and Close combat operations). By strength and capabilities, 1 battalion of Raider infantry is equal to 3 regular infantry battalions combined. There are currently about 39 raider battalions in the Indonesian Army Infantry branch, with the strength of 650 to 800 men per-battalion. It is larger compared to regular infantry battalions which only consist of about 450 to 570 infantrymen. Even as the Army Chief of Staff is planning in the future to qualify all Infantry battalions (except mechanized) as "Raider"-ready, there are now mechanized battalions which are "Raider"-qualified in addition to their mechanized role. Infantry battalions in the Indonesian Army originates from different combat organisations or corps, there are several infantry battalions part of Kostrad and some are part of the territorial military commands, the same case also falls to Raider Infantry battalions. Currently, there are now 3 Airborne infantry brigades in the Indonesian Army which are all Raider qualified (thus named Para-raider), and are all part of the Kostrad corps. The Infantry beret colors of the Indonesian army are as shown below:
  - Regular Infantry soldiers wear Green Beret with crossed-rifle insignia
  - Kostrad infantrymen wear Green Beret with Kostrad emblem (Airborne units are added a paratrooper wing insignia on the beret)
  - Raider infantrymen wear Dark Green beret with Raider bayonet emblem
  - Mechanized Infantrymen wear Dark Green beret with Mechanized Infantry emblem

There are today 6 types of Infantry battalions in the Indonesian Army, which are:

1. Para-Raider Infantry Battalion (abbreviated Yonif Para Raider) are Airborne infantry battalions part of Kostrad which are also capable in Air assault and Raid operations.
2. Mechanized-Raider Infantry Battalion (abbreviated Yonif Mekanis Raider) are Raider infantry battalions which are Mechanized that are special operations-capable which also can carry out urban warfare and ground mechanized infantry operations.
3. Raider Infantry Battalion (abbreviated Yonif Raider) are infantry battalions which are basically trained for Raid warfare and Air assault operations.
4. Mechanized Infantry Battalion (abbreviated Yonif Mekanis) are mobilized infantry battalions, equipped with APCs and IFVs.
5. Infantry Battalion (abbreviated Yonif) are light Infantry battalions.
6. Territorial Development Infantry Battalion (abbreviated Yonif TP) are battalions established starting in 2025, tasked with regional economic development in addition to combat roles. Each battalion contains agriculture, health, and construction companies tasked with economic development of their namesake duties. Personel of the territorial battalions wear general army green beret as the rest of the infantry.

All infantrymen of the Indonesian National Armed Forces have capabilities in Jungle warfare, including infantrymen from the Navy's Marine Corps and Air Force's Korpasgat .

=== Combat Support Elements (Satuan Bantuan Tempur) ===
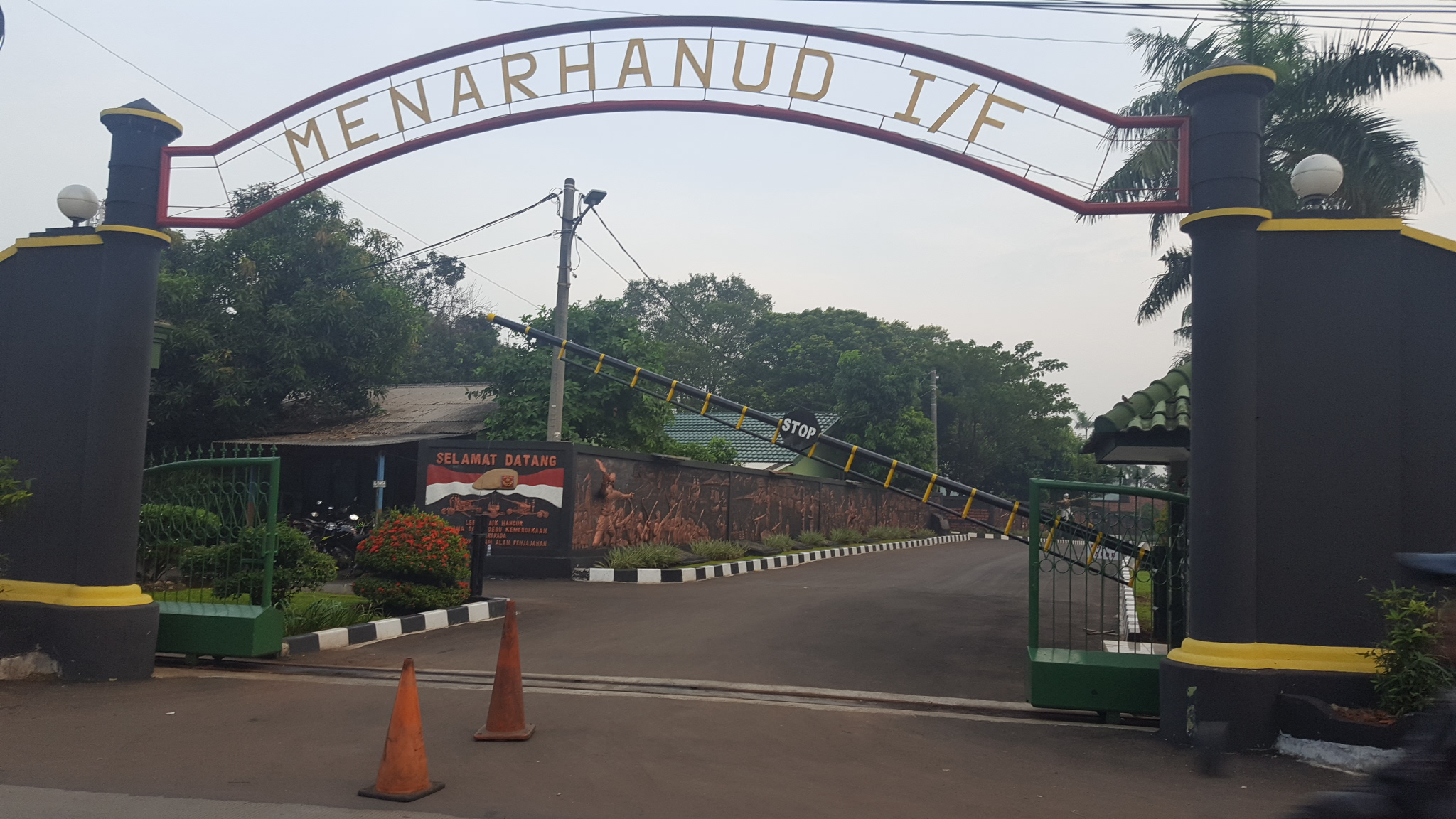
The 1st (Falatehan) Air Defense Artillery Regiment of the Kodam Jaya military district

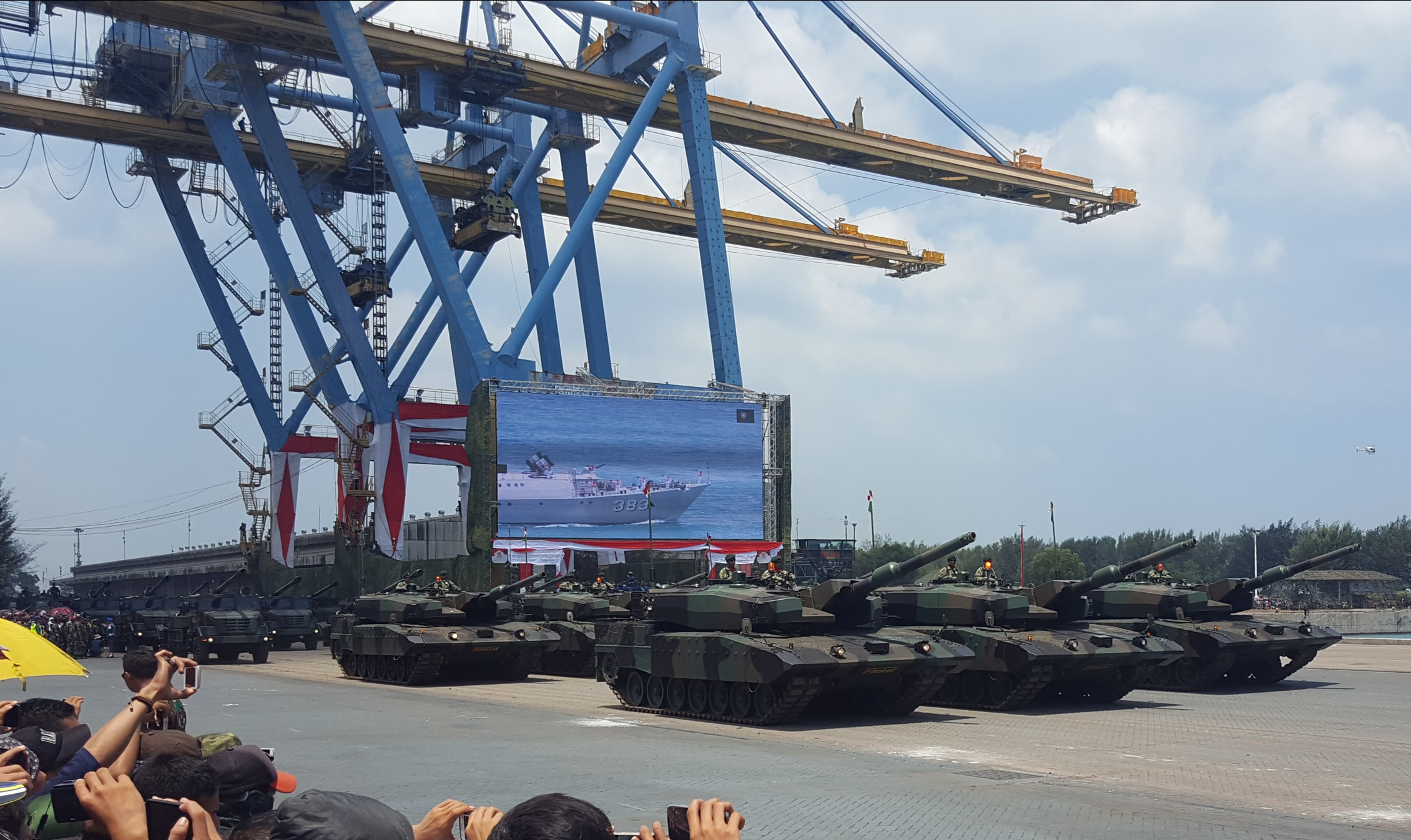
Leopard 2 tanks during parade at the ceremony of the Indonesian National Armed Forces Day

- Cavalry (KAV; Indonesian: Kavaleri) is the armored forces unit of the army. Its main function is as a combat support element. Cavalry units do not just rely on Tanks, APCs and IFVs as combat assets, but also use horses specially trained for combat and combat support operations in any terrain. Troopers wear black berets. The cavalry formations of the Army are under the supervision of the Cavalry Branch Center (Pusat Kesenjataan Kavaleri).
- Field Artillery (ARM; Indonesian: Artileri Medan) is the field artillery unit of the army. It also acts as a combat support similar to the cavalry unit. Its main function is to support ground combat mission for the Infantry Branch. Units of the Field Artillery use either towed or self propelled artillery guns and multiple rocket launchers. Brown berets are worn by its gunners. The Field Artillery units report under the Field Artillery Branch Center (Pusat Kesenjataan Artileri Medan).
- Air Defense Artillery (ARH; Indonesian: Artileri Pertahanan Udara) are the anti-aircraft defense units of the army. Its main function to defend other ground units from an air attack and help to protect installations from destruction. They are equipped with both anti-air defense guns and short range air defense missile systems, either MANPADs or vehicle-mounted systems. Like the Field Artillery, Brown berets are worn by its gunners and missile crews. The Air Defense Artillery units report to the Air Defense Artillery Branch Center (Pusat Kesenjataan Artileri Pertahanan Udara). Four detachments of missile artillery units called Den Rudal (Detasemen Rudal) are part of the Air Defense Artillery.
- Engineering Corps (CZI; Indonesian: Korps Zeni) - The Military Engineering Corps is specialty branch of the army whose primary function as a combat support, such as the construction of military bridges for vehicles to pass by or converting highways into temporary runways. Another function of this unit is to expand troop movements and narrowing enemy movements while assisting friendly units. The Military Engineers are also involved in relief operations in the aftermath of calamities and in building civil projects in the local communities. Engineers, regardless of rank, wear Grey berets or construction helmets in their uniforms. The unit is under the Directorate of Army Military Engineering.
- Ordnance Corps (CPL; Indonesian: Korps Peralatan) is a unit whose main function is the maintenance and testing of military ordnance. The unit is under the Directorate of Army Ordnance .
- Signal Corps (CKE; Indonesian: Korps Komunikasi dan Elektronika, lit. 'Electronics and Communications Corps') is a unit whose main function to deliver and maintain the best possible information to combat units. The unit is under the Directorate of Army Signals. Previously known as the Signal Corps (CHB; Indonesian: Korps Perhubungan), the nomenclature was changed in January 2024.
- Army Aviation Corps (CPN; Indonesian: Korps Penerbang Angkatan Darat) – The army maintain its own small air arm that performs attack, liaison and transport duties. It operates 100 aircraft in five helicopter and aircraft squadrons composed mostly of light aircraft and small transports, such as the IPTN produced CN-235. Five squadrons are continuously maintained, as follow:
  - 11th Squadron (light assault) based in Semarang
  - 21st Squadron (support) based in West Jakarta
  - 31st Squadron (heavy assault) based in Semarang
  - 12th Squadron (light assault) based in Way Kanan
  - 13th Squadron (support) based in Berau

=== Administrative Assistance Units (Satuan Bantuan Administrasi) ===
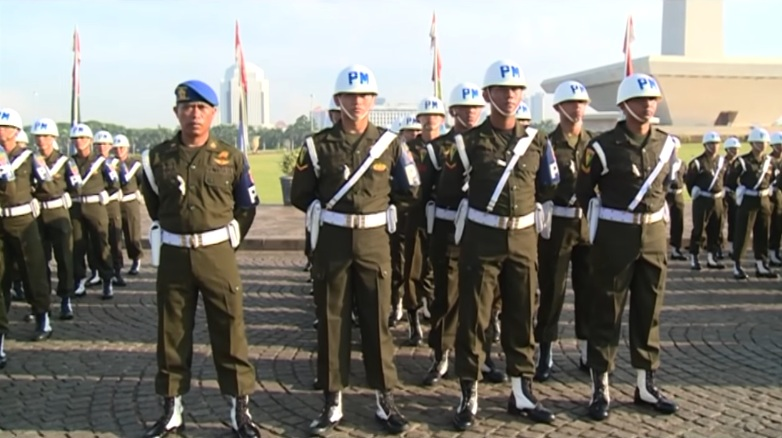
Indonesian Military Policemen

- Military Police Corps (CPM; Indonesian: Korps Polisi Militer) is categorized as for the administration assistance unit. Its main function is to maintain discipline, law and order within the entire Army. MP units wear either light blue berets which are dragged to the left or blue MP helmets. The Military Police is under the Army Military Police Command.
- Adjutant General Corps (CAJ; Indonesian: Korps Ajudan Jenderal) function as the military, public and military civil servants affairs administration. The adjutant general unit is under the Directorate of Army Adjudant General.
- Logistics and Transportation / Quartermaster Corps (CBA; Indonesian: Korps Pembekalan dan Angkutan) is tasked to provide services and transport logistic cargo within the Indonesian Army. Dark blue berets are worn by its personnel. The Logistic Transportation Corps is under the Directorate of Army Logistics and Transportation.
- Topography / Survey Corps (CTP; Indonesian: Korps Topografi) – This unit's main function is to make topographic research and maps about the battlefield for the purposes of the Indonesian Army during combat operations. This unit is under the Directorate of the Army Topography Service.
- Army Women's Corps (K; Indonesian: Korps Wanita Angkatan Darat) Operationally dependent on Army commands and services the Women's Army Corps serves as the official administrative branch of women who actively spend their active military service in the ranks of the Army.
- Medical Corps (CKM; Indonesian: Korps Kesehatan) main function is to maintain the health and medical wellness of all Army officers, warrant officers, NCOs and enlisted personnel. and their families. The health unit is under the Army Medical Department.
- Finance Corps (CKU; Indonesian: Korps Keuangan) main function is to foster the financial administration of the army. The finance unit is under the Directorate of Army Finance.
- Legal Corps (CHK; Indonesian: Korps Hukum) main function is to maintain law and justice within the army. The law unit is under the command of Directorate of the Army Justice Service. This unit is also responsible for military courts, and military attorneys and judges report under this unit.
- Bandsmen Corps (CMU; Indonesian: Korps Musik) – The Army Corps of Bandsmen, which is an administrative organization operationally dependent on Army commands and services, is responsible for the organization of the military bands, corps of drums and drum and bugle corps within the entire Army, alongside dedicated ensembles (big bands, rock and pop bands, native ensembles, etc.). Unlike the other support units, these are under the direct control of their respective unit commanders as HQ units and its overall supervision is under the Adjutant General of the Army. Bandsmen and field musicians wear the service dress berets or helmets of their reporting arm or branch of service.

== Rank structure ==
Command and Staff rank
An example of a Second lieutenant rank (left) with red band indicating a command rank. While (right) without red band indicating a staff rank.

In the Army, as well as in other armed forces branches in Indonesia, the rank consists of three groups of ranks: Perwira for officers, Bintara for NCOs, and Tamtama for enlisted. The proper title to address of rank are as follows and applicable to all branch of TNI, all flag officers (generals, admirals, and air marshals) use their rank followed by "(TNI)", while senior and junior officers use their rank followed by respective branch/corps abbreviation. For example, an Army colonel with Infantry branch use the title "Kolonel INF" (read as Kolonel Infanteri), while an Army Major General from Infantry branch use the title "Mayor Jenderal (TNI)". Enlisted personnel are not required to put their respective branch/corps specialty.

Note: Indonesia is not a member of NATO, so there is not an official equivalence between the Indonesian military ranks and those defined by NATO. The displayed parallel is approximate and for illustration purposes only.

Note: The red banding on the rank insignia denotes the personnel holding a command position which is agnostic of rank.

=== Officers ===
Rank group	General / flag officers					Senior officers			Junior officers
Indonesian Army
Indonesian Army	Jenderal besar	Jenderal	Letnan jenderal	Mayor jenderal	Brigadir jenderal	Kolonel	Letnan kolonel	Mayor	Kapten	Letnan satu	Letnan dua

=== Enlisted ===
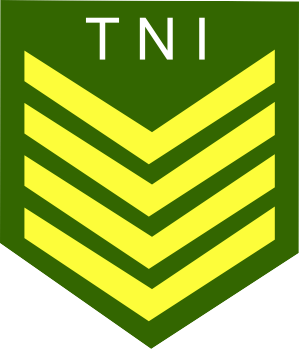
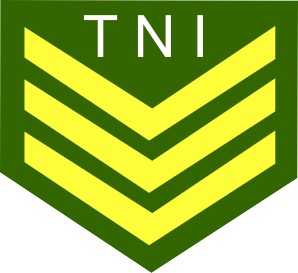
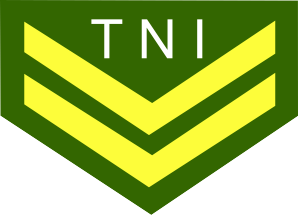
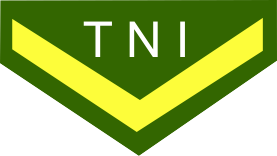
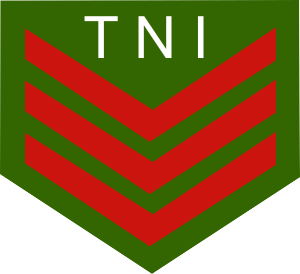
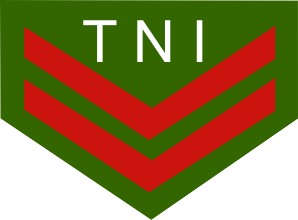
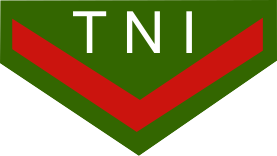
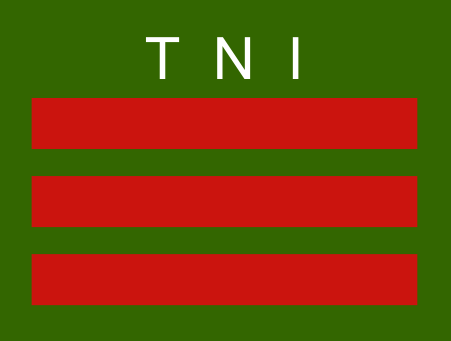
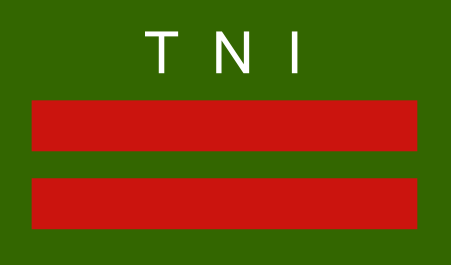
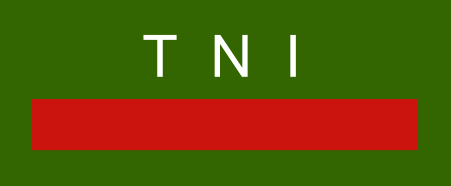
Rank group	Senior NCOs						Junior NCOs			Enlisted
Indonesian Army
Indonesian Army	Pembantu letnan satu	Pembantu letnan dua	Sersan mayor	Sersan kepala	Sersan satu	Sersan dua	Kopral kepala	Kopral satu	Kopral dua	Prajurit kepala	Prajurit satu	Prajurit dua

== Photo gallery ==
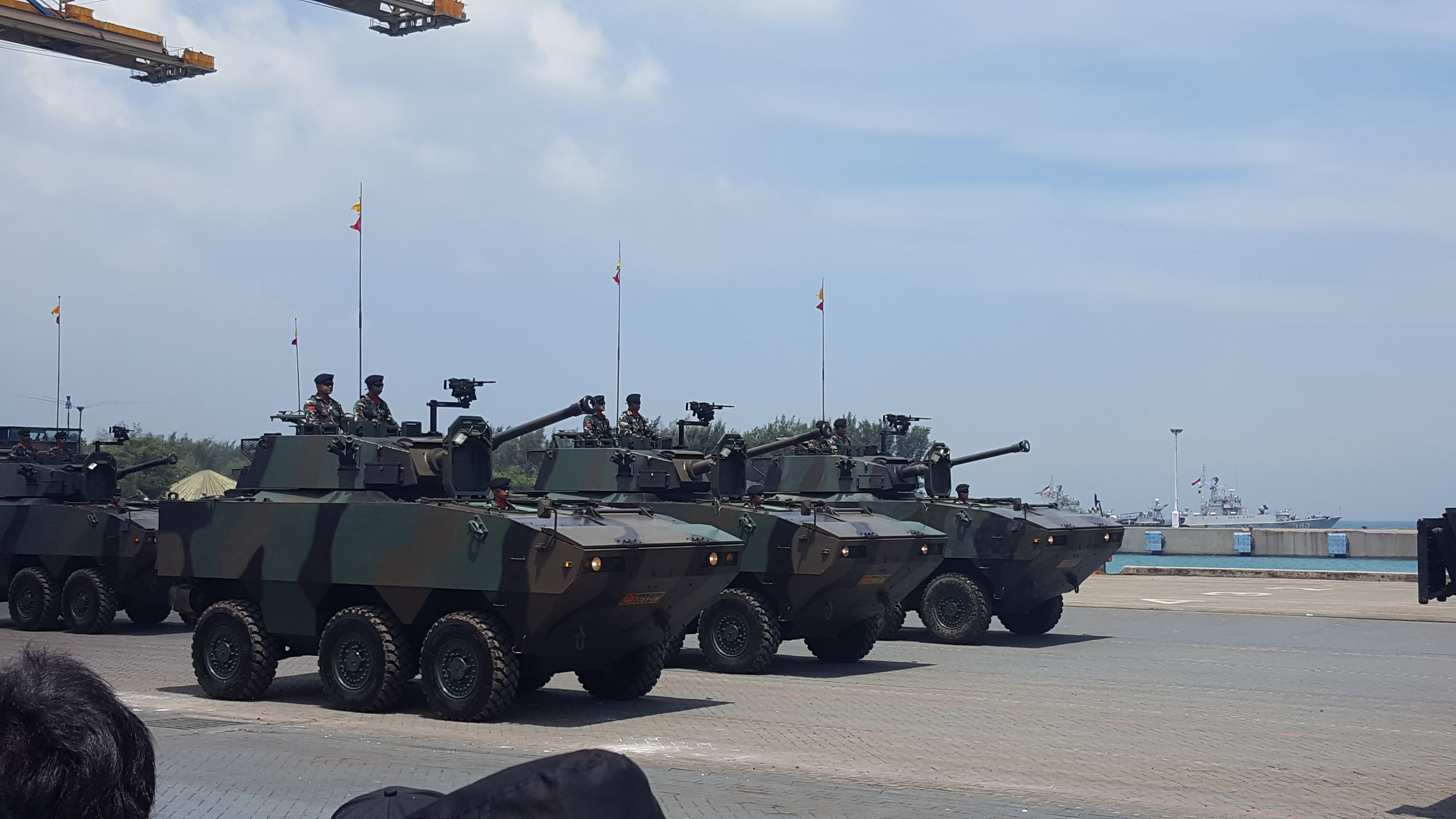
Hanwha Defense Systems Tarantula FSVs

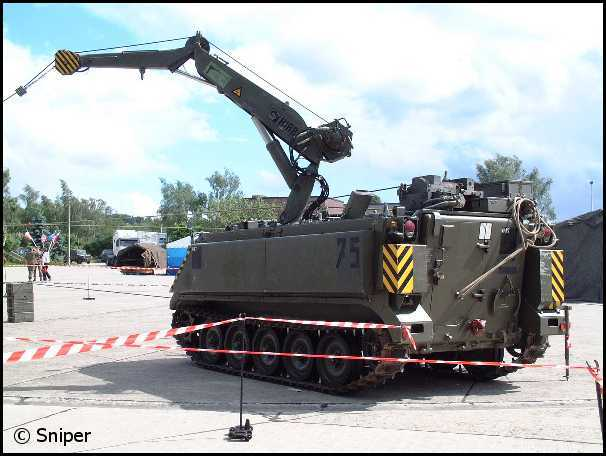
M113A1-B-Rec

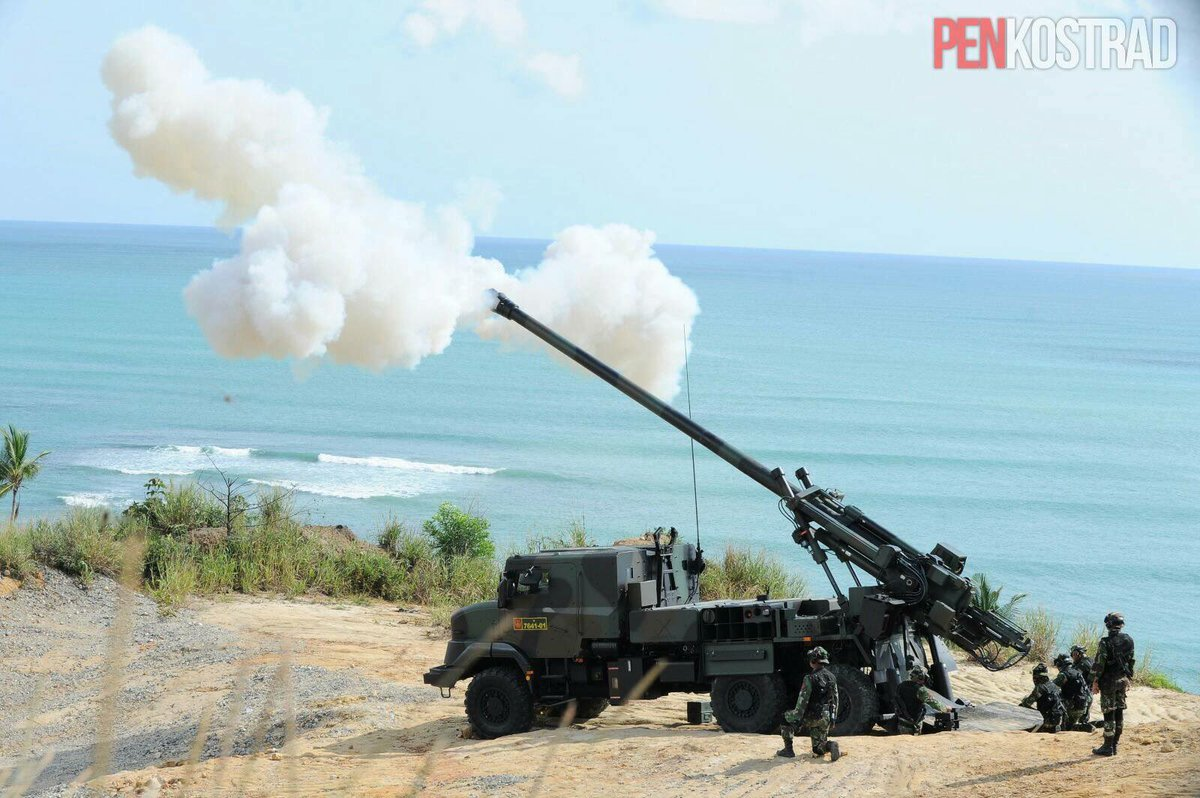
CAESAR self-propelled howitzer

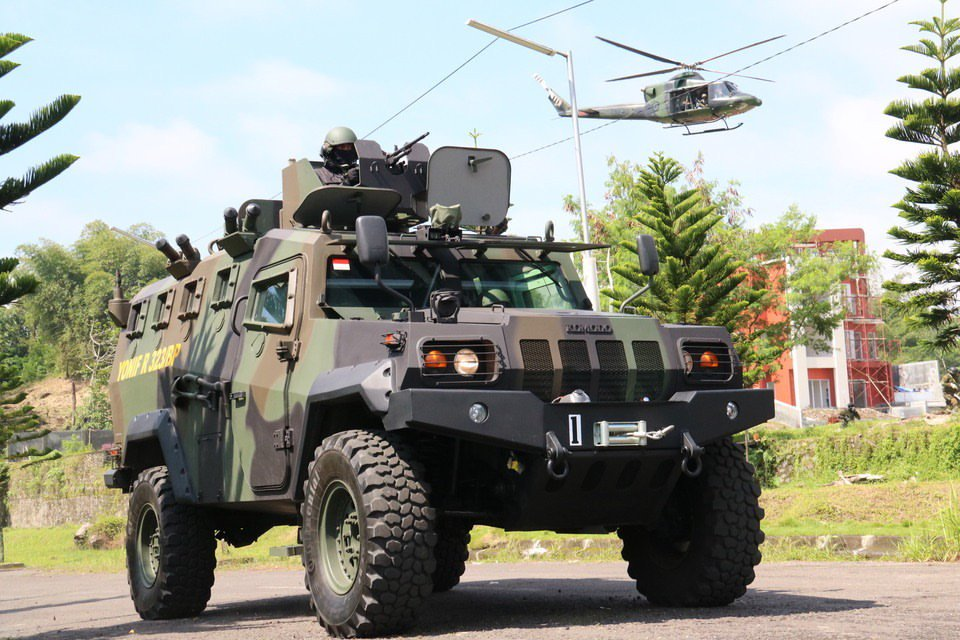
Pindad Komodo

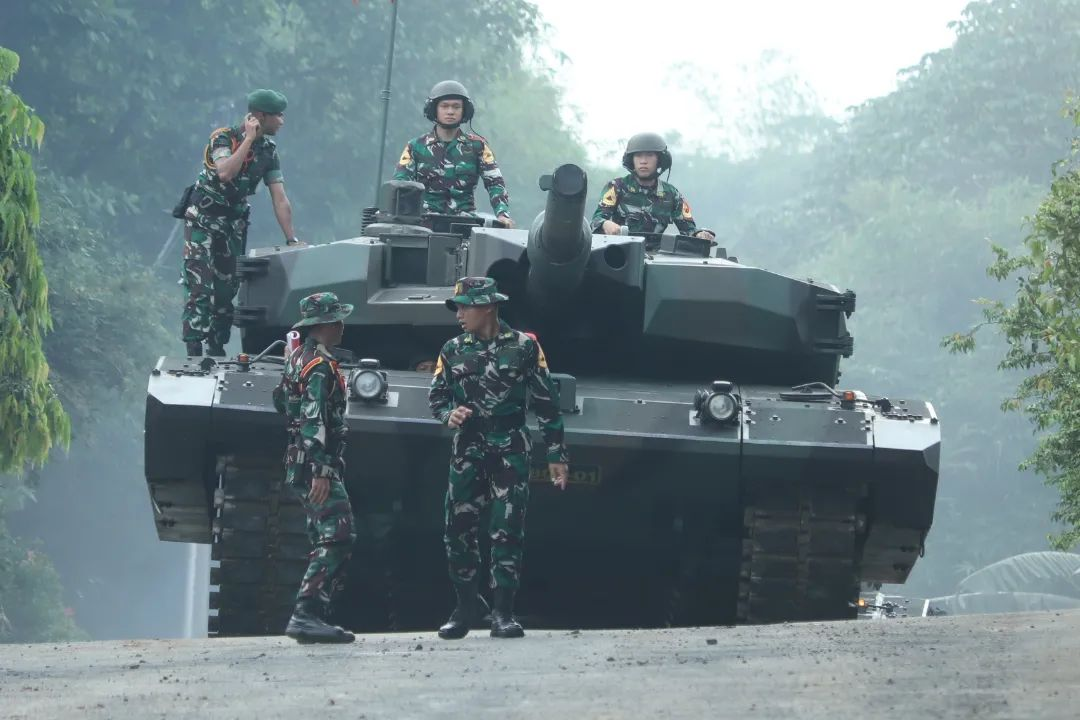
Indonesian Army (TNI AD) cadets learning how to operate Leopard 2RI and Marder 1A3 in East Jakarta

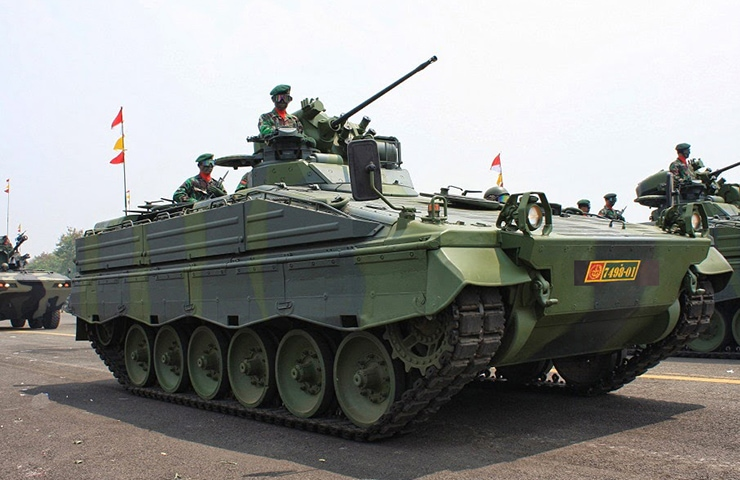
Marder 1A3 IFV

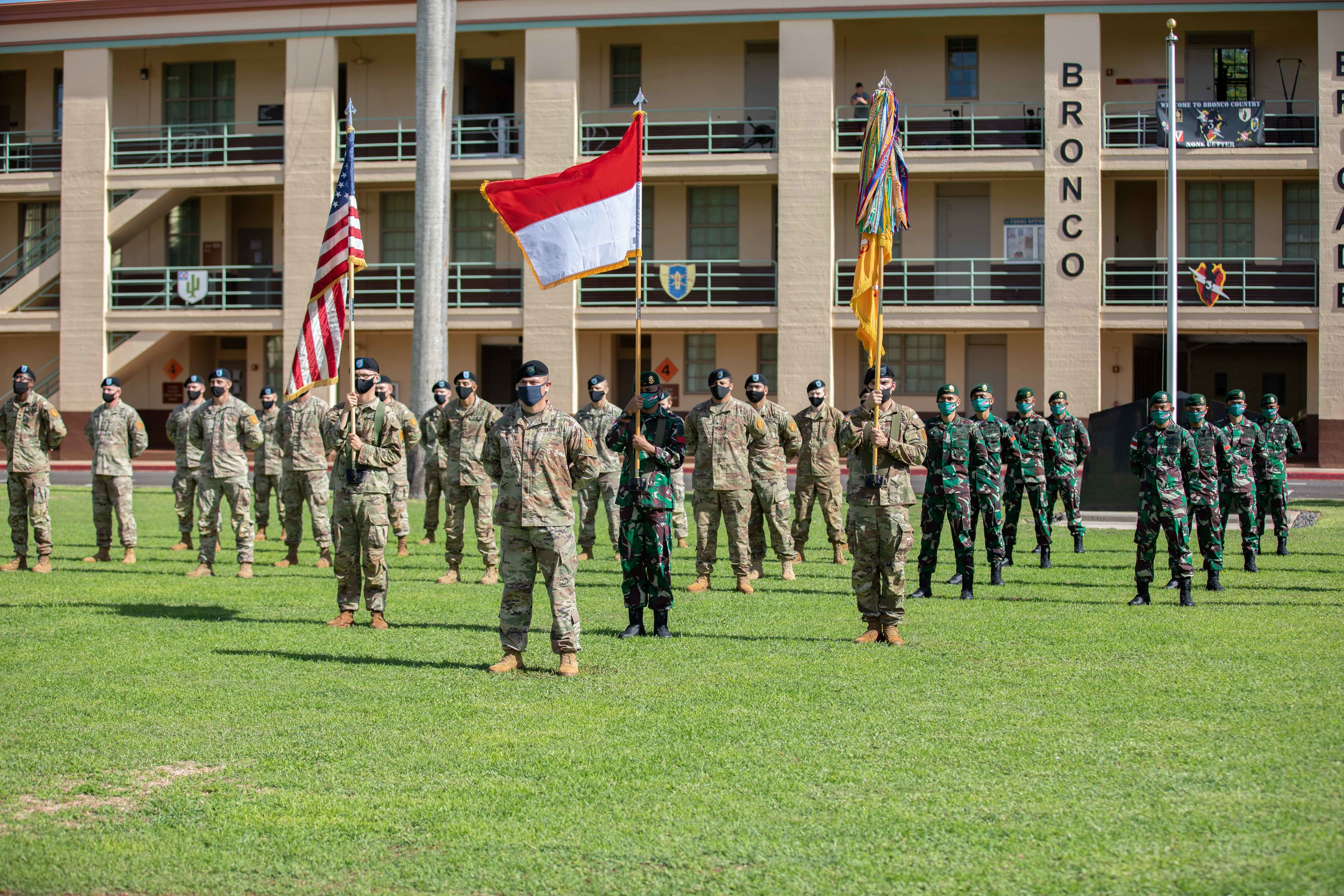
Soldiers assigned to 3rd Squadron, 4th Cavalry Regiment, 3rd Infantry Brigade Combat Team, 25th Infantry Division stand together in formation with Soldiers assigned to the Indonesian Army's 431st Para Raider Infantry Battalion during the opening ceremony of the U.S

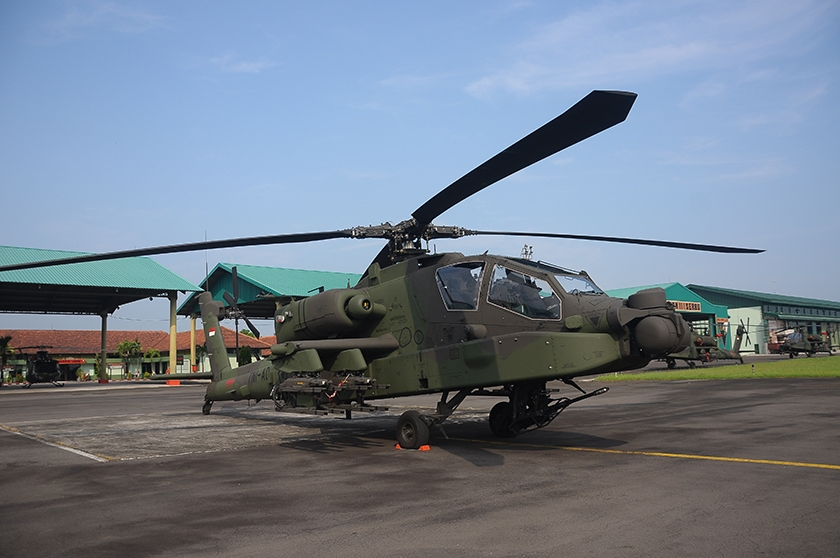
AH-64E Apache Helicopter of the Indonesian Army Aviation Center.

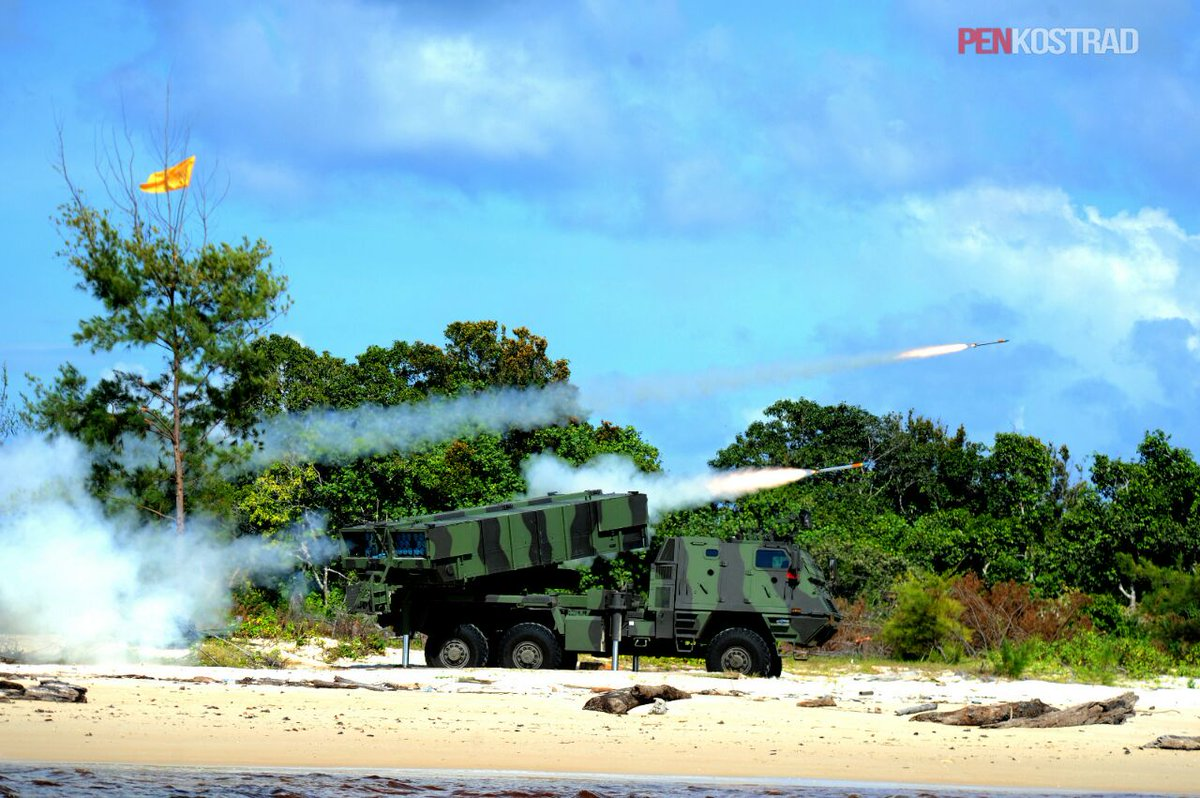
ASTROS II MK6 MLRS

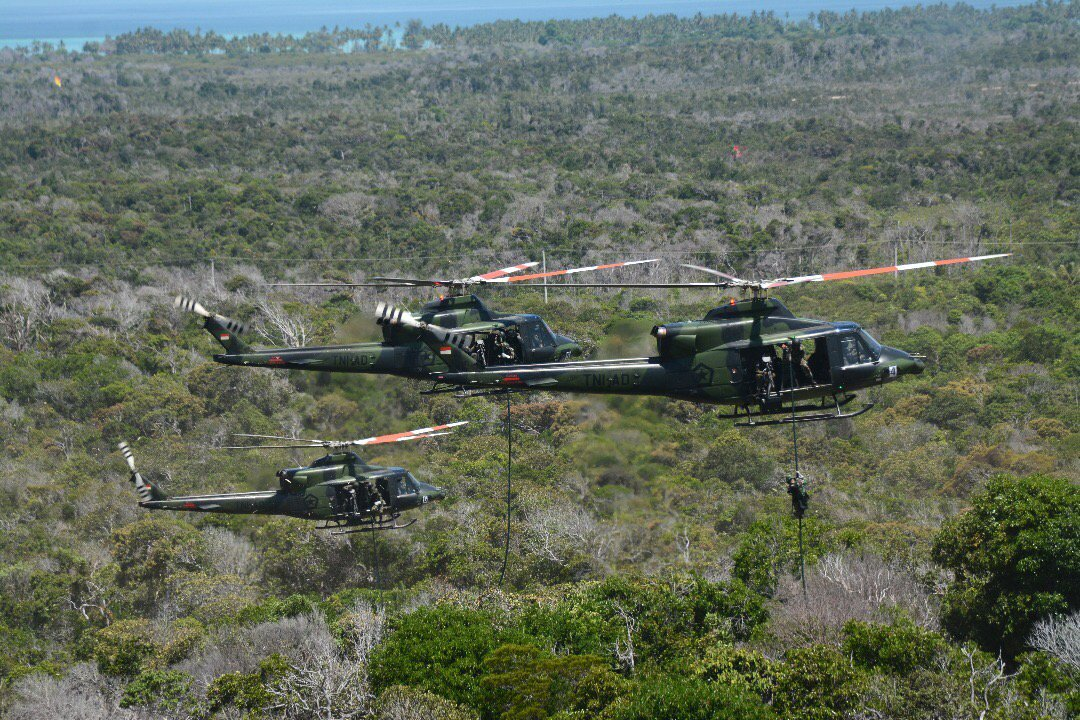
Bell 412s of the Indonesian Army Aviation Center

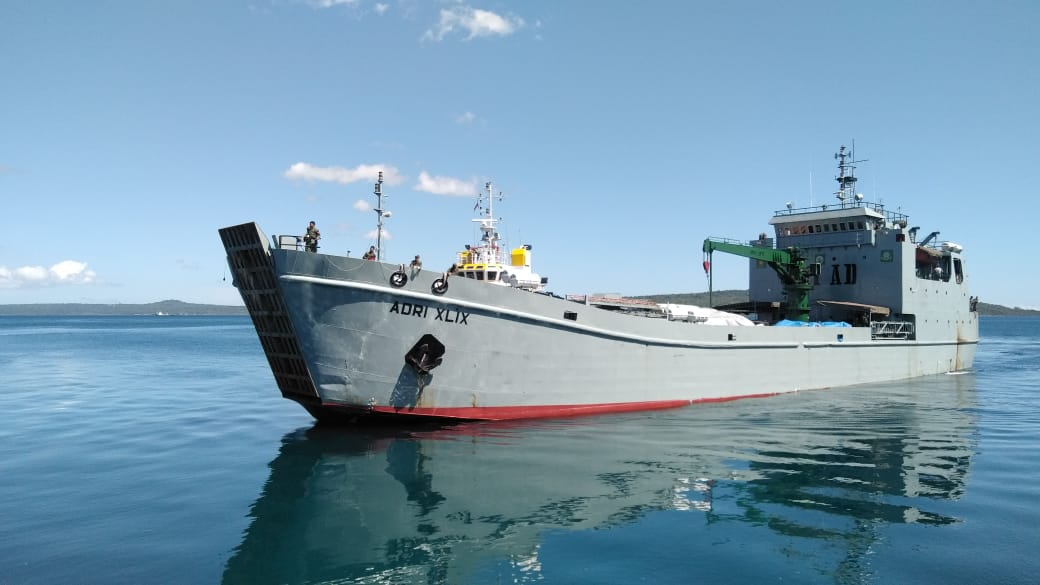
Indonesian Army LSTs of the Army's water transportation unit.

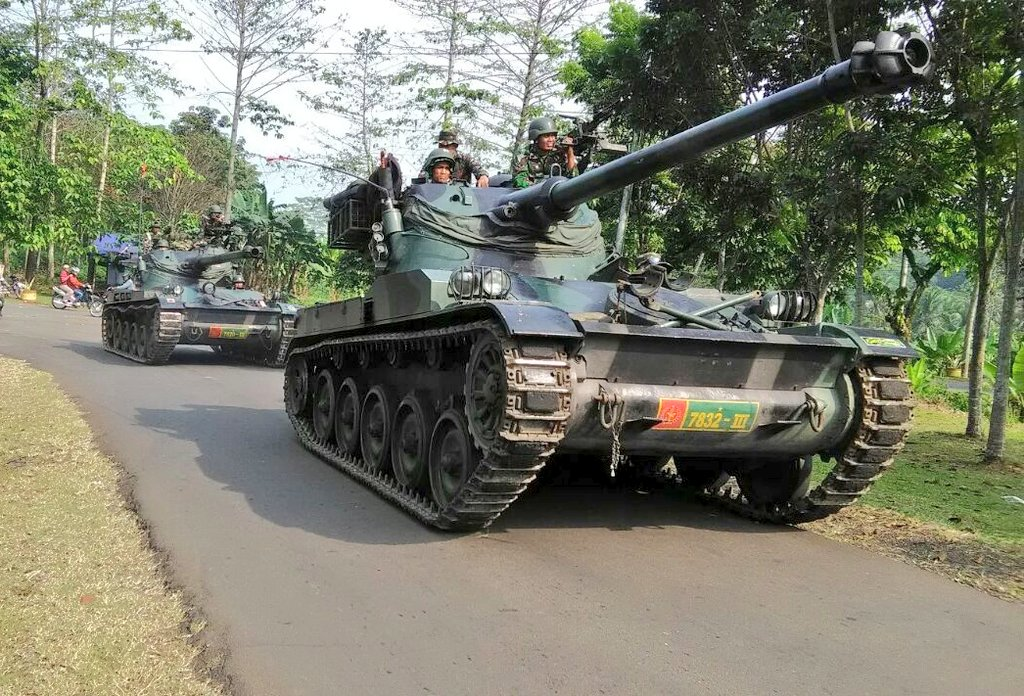
AMX-13 light tank of the 4th Cavalry Battalion

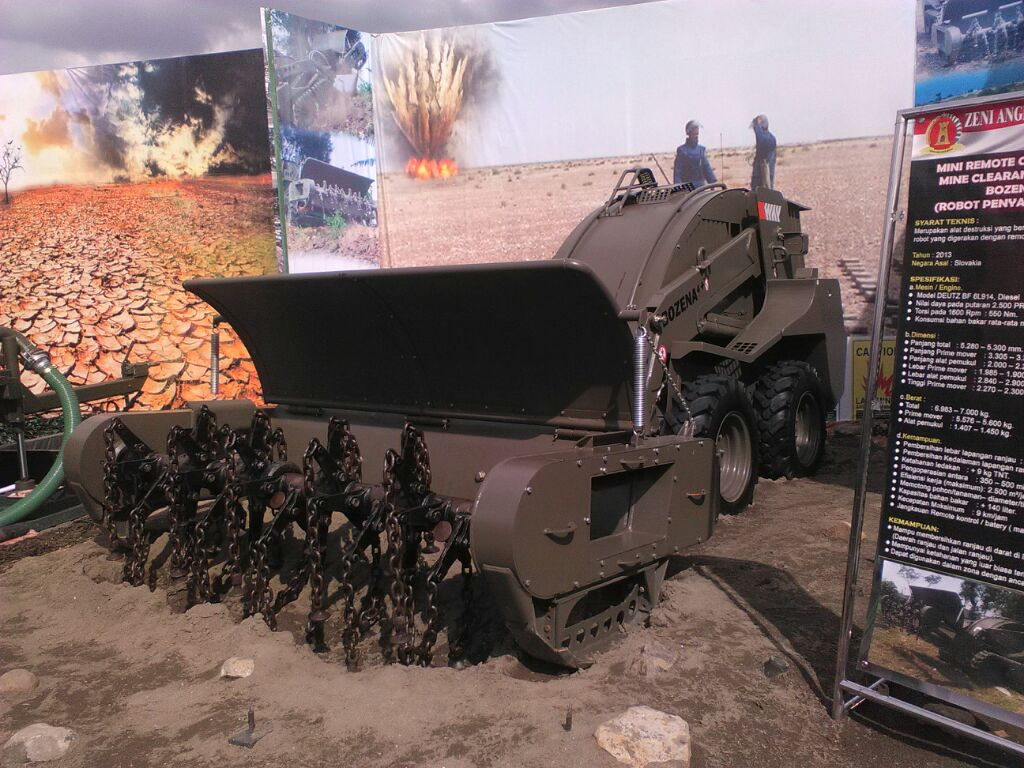
Bozena used by the Army's Engineering Corps.

== See also ==
- Ministry of Defense (Indonesia)
- Indonesian Military Academy
- Indonesian Navy
- Indonesian Marines
- Indonesian Air Force
- Fifth Force

== Bibliography ==
- Friend, Theodore (2003). Indonesian Destinies. The Belknap Press of Harvard University Press. ISBN 0-674-01834-6.
- Reid, Anthony. The Indonesian National Revolution 1945-1950. (Publisher: Longman Pty Ltd., Melbourne, 1974) ISBN 0-582-71046-4.
- Ricklefs, M.C. A History of Modern Indonesia Since c. 1300. (Second Edition. MacMillan, 1991)
