= Indonesian Army Logistics and Transportation Corps =

Indonesian Army Logistics and Transportation Center
- Pusat Pembekalan Angkutan Angkatan Darat
- Active: 22 June 1952 - present
- Country: Indonesia
- Branch: Indonesian Army Central Executive Agencies
- Type: Military logistics corps
- Role: Logistics and transportation support and assistance
- Garrison/HQ: Kramat Jati, Jakarta
- Mottos: Dharmagati Ksatria Jaya ("Devoted, dynamic, victorious warrior")
- Colors: Red and gold
- Anniversaries: June 22
- Engagements: Indonesian National Revolution; Republic of South Maluku rebellion 1950; Permesta/PRRI rebellion of 1957–58; Darul Islam rebellion Operation Trikora; Indonesia-Malaysia confrontation Indonesian invasion of East Timor; United Nations peacekeeping operations
- Website: www.ditbekangad.mil.id

Commanders
- Transport and Quartermaster Director General: Maj.Gen. Diding Ahmad Kizwini
- Deputy Director General: Brig. Gen. Rommy Tuwaidan
- Inspector General Transport and Quartermaster: Brig. Gen. Gusman Hakim

The Indonesian Army Logistics and Transportation Center (Indonesian: Pusat Pembekalan Angkutan Angkatan Darat) is a sustainment – formerly combat service support (CSS) – agency of the Indonesian Army. Its primary missions are supporting the development, production, acquisition, and sustainment of general supply, mortuary affairs, subsistence, petroleum and water, material and distribution management during peace and war and in support of civil disaster relief. It is also tasked with providing combat logistics and equipment, personnel and materiel transport services over any terrain on land, rail, air and sea in coordination with the other service branches of the Indonesian National Armed Forces.

== Brief history ==
The Pusbekangad, founded in 1951 as the separate Army Intendance Department and the Army Corps of Transportation, is successor of the traditions of logistics and transport formations active during the Indonesian National Revolution. These formations, including the paramilitary Indonesian Railway Youth (Angkatan Moeda Kereta Api (AMKA, literally "Railway Youth Forces")), provided the basis for a professional logistics service that is mandated to supply and assist the Army in war and in peace. Units and commands of Intendance and Transportation within the young Army as a whole and in regional formations underwent several changes in the name of the organization, but from these names none of the changes occurred in both functions relating to the service functions performed up to this very day.

Decree of the Minister of Defence Kep/A/157/IV/1970 reorganized the Corps, wherein the Transportation and Logistics School was raised in its modern form. In 1985, as part of the professionalization efforts within the Army, by virtue of the two Decisions of the Chief of Staff of the Army, namely Decree Skep/31/V/1985 and Skep/796/IX/1985, respectively, the two separate Corps Directorates were merged to become the Directorate of the Army Logistics and Transportation Corps effective 18 September 1985. In 2004, under then Chief of Staff of the Army Ryamizard Ryacudhu, the two staff speciality corps under the command of the Director General Ditbekangad, following years of planning, were merged under one specialty, the Logistics and Transportation Corps (Corps Pembekalan Angkutan), whose personnel wear dark blue berets in their uniforms. In 2020, the Directorate became a full Command Department under the Chief of Staff of the Army.

June 22, its Corps Day, is the date of the enactment of Decree M.198/Kasad/Kpts/1952 from the office of the then Chief of Staff of the Army Abdul Harris Nasution in 1952, in which the Corps was granted with its own Corps Colour in recognition of services rendered in the years of the National Revolution, and thus renamed the then Department's personnel corps as the Army Intendance and Logistics Corps (Corps Intendans Angkatan Darat (CIAD)).

== Functions ==
The function of the Logistics and Transportation Corps is to provide the following support to the Army:

- general supply (except for ammunition and medical supplies)
- Mortuary Affairs (formerly graves registration)
- subsistence (food service)
- petroleum and water
- field services
  - aerial delivery (parachute packing, air item maintenance, heavy and light equipment parachute drop, rigging and sling loading)
  - shower, laundry, fabric/light textile repair
- material and distribution management
- military transport movement of personnel and material

== Leadership and school ==
The officer in charge of the branch for doctrine, training, and professional development purposes is the Transport and Quartermaster Director General, who is appointed and relieved by authority of the Chief of Staff of the Indonesian Army and holds the rank of major general. He is assisted by the Deputy Director, an officer of brigadier general rank. The Quartermaster Director General does not have command authority over Quartermaster and Transportation units, but instead oversees supervision over the Cimahi-based Transportation and Logistics Training School (Pusat Pendidikan Pembekalan Angkutan (Pusdikbekang)), which is under the Army Doctrine, Education and Training Development Command.

== Organization ==
The Director General's office oversees the following formations under its direct supervision:

- 5th Transport Battalion (Air)
- Maritime Transport Unit (Regimental sized)

Independent quartermaster detachments, companies and battalions are normally assigned to the operational control of the three Kostrad divisions, Kopassus and all the 27 military regions under their commanding officers. These units have combined functional areas of these two duties under the two former separate staff corps. In addition, there are 2 transport battalions under the purview of the Kostrad.

== See also ==
- Indonesian Army
