= Giri Kedaton =

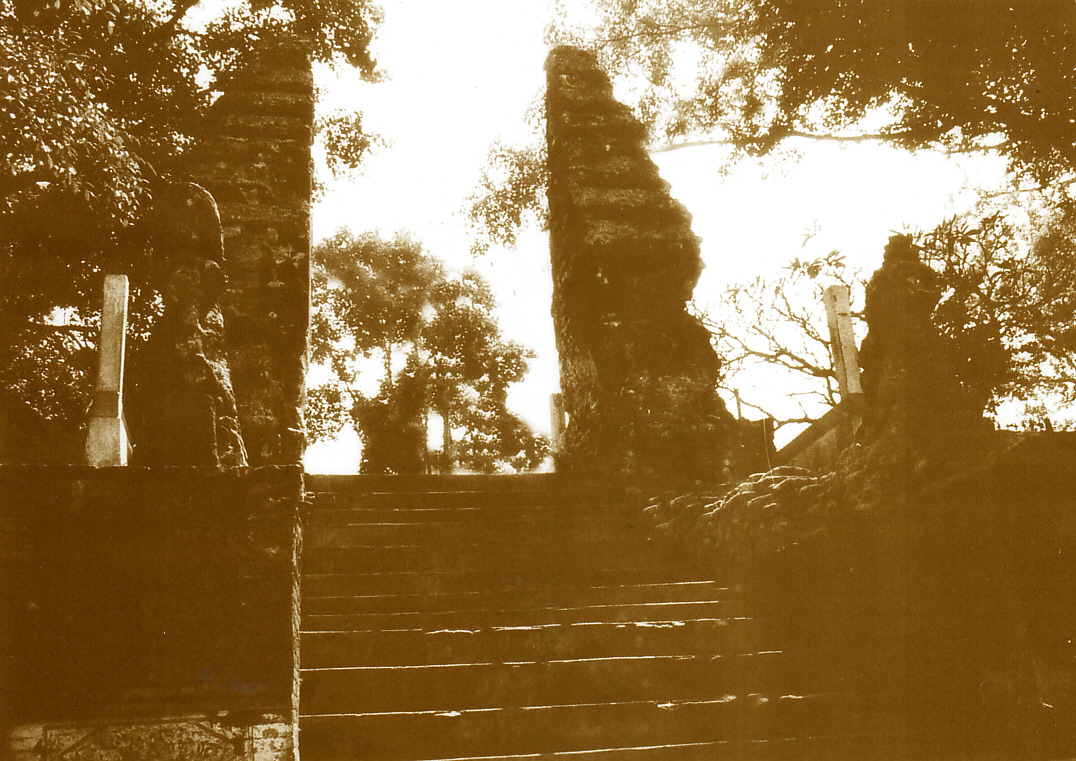
Gapura Naga (dragon gate) as a sign of entering the Giri Kedaton area. Now it is a marker for entering the Sunan Giri grave complex.

Giri Kedaton (also called Giri Kadaton in Javanese, Kedatuan Giri in Indonesian) was an Islamic kedatuan (city-state or principality) located in Gresik, East Java and existed in the 15th to 17th centuries, until Giri was conquered by the Mataram Sultanate in 1636.

At that time Giri Kedaton had high popularity among Islamic intellectuals, so that many students from all over the archipelago came to study religion. Because they had strong legitimacy, prospective sultans from Demak, Pajang, and early Mataram asked for legitimacy from Sunan Giri before taking up the position of sultan. This happened because at that time, Javanese society adhered to the principle of divine power, namely that a reigning power descended from God, so in this case, because of its unique power in religion for the Javanese people that made Sunan Giri and the Giri Kedaton asked by the kingdom in Java at that time to legitimize their power like the Pope in Rome.

Now the location of Giri Kedaton is part of the Sunan Giri Tomb complex where Sunan Giri and his family, including Sunan Prapen are buried.

== Early history ==
Giri Kedaton was founded by Sunan Giri, a member of Walisongo, in 1481. Sometime earlier, Sunan Giri, whose initial name was Joko Samudro, studied from Sunan Ampel to study religion. Then Sunan Ampel gave him the title Raden Paku. Raden Paku was asked to continue his education in Pasai before continuing his education further in Mecca. This is where he met his father, Maulana Ishaq.

For several months, Raden Paku stayed there to study political science with his father. One of the pieces of knowledge he gained was finding a strategic place that in the long run would become his royal palace. Then, Raden Paku was provided with a handful of land by his father to find a place with land that was similar to that handful of land.

Returning from Pasai, he met Sunan Ampel to discuss this. Then Raden Paku started doing the ritual of tracing, in the mountains in Gresik. The ritual lasted quite a long time and Raden Paku kept moving from mountain to mountain. Until one night he saw a beam of light when he was praying at midnight on Mount Petukangan. The light fell on the peak between Mount Petukangan and Sumber. The peak is the place where Raden Paku has been looking for so far. A handful of land is also the same as the land at the top.

He is nicknamed Sunan Giri because he built a Giri pesantren which was founded in 1478, on the top of the mountain. In Sanskrit, the mountain is translated as Giri.

Babad ing Gresik calls the Giri pesantren the "kingdom of Giri" and is led by Raden Paku, by establishes himself as "King Pendhita" and has the title Prabu Satmita. H. J. de Graaf and Samuel Wiselius also called the Giri pesantren the "kingdom of ulama" (Geestelijke Heeren).

== Golden age ==
The Giri Kedaton experienced a golden age under the leadership of Sunan Prapen in 1548–1605. The power of Sunan Giri (as a title of power) at that time could be compared to the power of the Pope in Rome for Europe in the Middle Ages. Almost all important events related to changes in leadership at the center of the Islamic kingdom at that time had to be carried out in Giri Kedaton, not only a religious school but also a unity that had political power.

For example, Sunan Prapen who is said to be the inauguration of Sultan Adiwijaya, the first Sultan of Pajang. He also mediated the meeting between Adiwijaya and the regents of East Java in 1568. In that meeting, the regents of East Java agreed to recognize Pajang's power as a continuation of the Demak Sultanate.

Sunan Prapen was also the pacifier of the war between Panembahan Senopati the king of Mataram against Jayalengkara, the regent of Surabaya in 1588. The war was motivated by the refusal of the regents of East Java to the power of Senopati which had brought down the Pajang Sultanate.

Not only that, Sunan Prapen was almost always at the inauguration of every Muslim kings who ascended the throne in all parts of the archipelago.

== Mataram conquest ==
The Mataram Sultanate under Sultan Agung's rule wanted Giri Kedaton to submit to it as a vassal. In 1630 Giri Kedaton under the leadership of Sunan Kawis Guwa rejected Mataram's rule. Not a single Mataram officer dared to face Giri. They are still afraid of Walisongo's holiness even though the council no longer exists.

Sultan Agung also appointed his brother-in-law, Prince Pekik, the son of Jayalengkara from Surabaya, to face Giri. The spirit of the Mataram troops rose because Pangeran Pekik was a descendant of Sunan Ampel, while Sunan Kawis Guwa was a descendant of Sunan Giri, where Sunan Giri was a student of Sunan Ampel.

Mataram finally won the war over the conquest of Giri around 1636. Sunan Kawis Guwa was invited to continue to lead Giri on the condition that he submit to Mataram.

Since then, Giri's prestige has faded. The substitute for Sunan Kawis Guwa is no longer entitled Sunan Giri but has the title Panembahan Ageng Giri. This title influenced the ruler of the Tanjungpura Kingdom in West Kalimantan when he embraced Islam using the title Panembahan Giri Kusuma.

== See also ==
- Blambangan kingdom

== Bibliography ==
- Abu Khalid. Kisah Walisongo. Surabaya: Terbit Terang
- Babad Tanah Jawi, Mulai dari Nabi Adam Sampai Tahun 1647. (terj.). 2007. Yogyakarta: Narasi
- H.J. de Graaf dan T.H. Pigeaud. 2001. Kerajaan Islam Pertama di Jawa. Terj. Jakarta: Graffiti
- M.C. Ricklefs. 1991. Sejarah Indonesia Modern (terj.). Yogyakarta: Gadjah Mada University Press
- Sartono Kartodirdjo. 1993. Pengantar Sejarah Indonesia Baru 1500 – 1900, dari Emporium sampai Imperium Jilid 1. Jakarta: Gramedia
- J. Ras.1993. Geschiedschrijving en de legitimateit van het koningschap op Java In: Bijdragen tot de Taal-, Land- en Volkenkunde 150 (1994), no: 3, Leiden, 518-538
- Sudibjo Z. H., R Soeparmo. 1981. Babad Trunajaya - Surapati. Balai pustaka
