= Javanisation =

Javanese cultural dominance in Indonesia

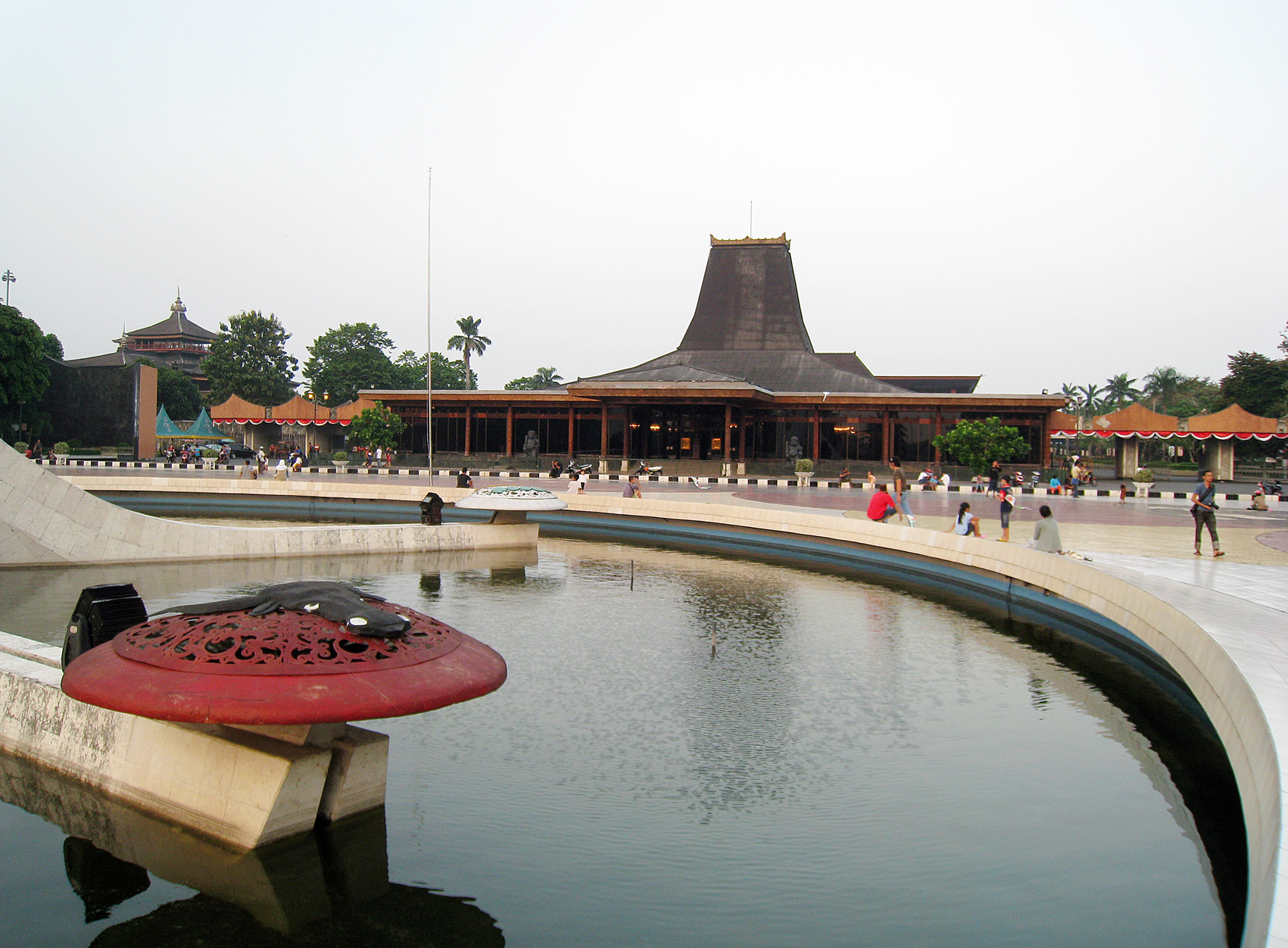
The Sasono Utomo main building in Taman Mini Indonesia Indah, featuring Javanese joglo architecture, stands in front of Alun-Alun Pancasila. The park was built by Tien Suharto, former first lady and wife of Suharto.

Javanisation is the process in which Javanese culture dominates, assimilates, or influences other cultures in general (Indonesian: Jawanisasi/Penjawaan). The term "Javanise" means "to make or to become Javanese in form, idiom, style, or character". This domination could take place in various aspects; such as cultural, language, politics, and social.

In its modern sense within Indonesian social, cultural and politics perspective; Javanization simply means the spreading of rural Javanese population of densely populated Java to less populated parts of the archipelago. While to others it could also mean the conscious or unconscious imposition of Javanese patterns of thought and behavior throughout Indonesia, in the sense of cultural imperialism. In previous sense it is more focused on thinking and practice of those in power.

While other writer focused on its political aspect, which describes Javanisation as a process whereby ethnic Javanese or Javanised individuals gradually became the overwhelming and disproportionate majority of the governing elite in the Indonesian post-independence era.

The term "Javanise" however, is not only to describe outward process, but also inward; it is also used to describes the adoption and assimilation of foreign social-cultural influences and elements into Javanese culture. These foreign influences are somehow interpreted and adopted to suit Javanese frame of reference, style, needs and social-cultural conditions. The adoption of Indian Hindu epics and cultural elements in 5th to 15th-century Java and the adoption of Islam by Wali Sanga also Roman Catholicism by Franciscus van Lith into Javanese culture in 15th and late 19th - early 20th centuries are the notable examples.

The promotion and expansion of Javanese cultural elements, such as Javanese language, architecture, cuisine, batik, wayang, gamelan, and kris are also can be seen as the manifestation of Javanisation process. The Javanese migration to settle in places out of their traditional homeland in Central and East Java to other places in Indonesia (Sumatra, Kalimantan, Sulawesi, Papua, etc.), the Malay Peninsula (esp. Johor and Selangor), Singapore, and Suriname, is also a contributing factor of Javanisation process.

== Javanese domination in Nusantara ==
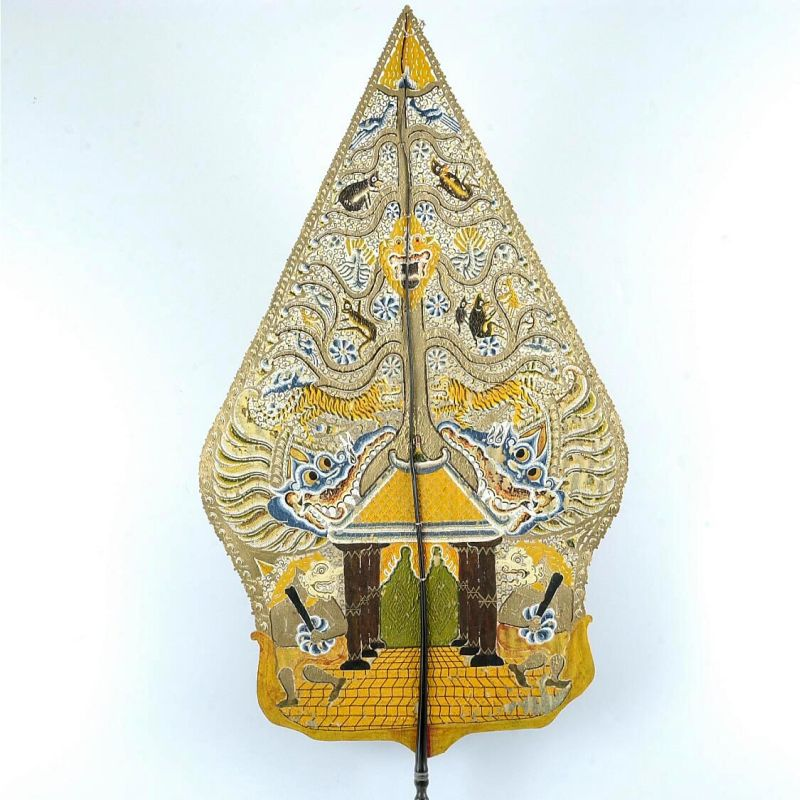
Javanese cultural expressions, such as wayang and gamelan, are often used to promote Javanese culture.

This Javanese cultural hegemony or domination could take form in various aspects. Such as physical through the expansions and settlements of Javanese diaspora outside their traditional homeland in Java. In spiritual and behavioural aspects, the Javanisation process includes the promotion of Javanese culture and values; such as obsession with elegance and refinements (Javanese: alus), subtleness, politeness, courtesy, indirectness, emotional restraint and consciousness to one's social stature. Javanese values harmony and social order highly, and abhorred direct conflicts and disagreements. These Javanese values were often promoted through Javanese cultural expressions, such as Javanese dance, gamelan, wayang, and batik as national culture of Indonesia. It also being reinforced through adherence to Javanese adat (traditional rules) in ceremonies, such as slametan, satu suro, Javanese wedding, and naloni mitoni.

In the language aspect, such as the using of Javanese terms, idioms, and vocabularies outside of traditional Javanese language realm. For example, today it is commons for Indonesians to use Javanese terms to address people across Indonesia, such as mas (to address the same of age or slightly older male) or mba (for female counterparts). It is common in national capital Jakarta; however, this phenomenon has somewhat alarmed the Malay and Minangkabau-speaking realms in Sumatra, also by the Sundanese neighbors in western part of Java, that considered it as a form of Javanization and cultural imperialism.

In social and politics, the examples of perceived Javanisation such as numbers of Indonesian Presidents are always Javanese (even B. J. Habibie who is maternally Javanese — and Javanese kinship is bilineal). Also the alleged Javanese political dominance in government administrations, civil service, military and police, as well as Javanese traits in Indonesian political culture.

== History ==
The expansion of Majapahit empire circa 14th century

=== Early history: influence of Indian Hindu-Buddhist civilization ===
The island of Java has been a centre stage of Indonesian history for centuries, and Javanese people as the largest ethnic groups in Indonesia have been dominating the politics and social landscapes in the past as well as modern Indonesia.

In its early stages, Javanese culture was heavily influenced by Indian Hindu-Buddhist civilization. The example of this process is the adoption of many Sanskrit loanwords into old Javanese, and the Javanisation of Indian Hindu epics such as Ramayana and Mahabharata into Javanese version, and incorporating local deities such as Semar and Punakawan into their Wayang Purwa stories. The process of adopting Hindu influences is described as the Sanskritisation of Java and the Javanisation of the Bharata. The blossoming of Javanese classical literature for example are the composing of Kakawin Ramayana and Arjunawiwaha.

The early examples of Javanisation is the expansion of Javanese Sailendran arts — developed in 8th to 9th-century Central Java — that influences the aesthetics of Srivijayan Buddhist arts discovered in Sumatra, Southern Thailand and the Malay Peninsula. Despite absorbing Indian influences from Gupta and Amaravati arts, to Southern India Pallava influences, Javanese Sailendran art in return influenced the art and aesthethic of the Southeast Asian region.

The early classical period, during Eastern Java Mataram kingdom in the 10th century, saw the expansion of Javanese influence to Bali. East Javanese princess Mahendradatta become the queen consort of King Udayana Warmadewa of Bali, signify the Javanese increasing influences upon Bali. During the reign of Airlangga, Bali had effectively become a part of the East Javanese Hindu realm.

The expansion of Singhasari kingdom in the 13th century during the reign of Kertanegara strengthened the Javanese influence in the region, especially upon Bali and Melayu Kingdom in Eastern coast of Sumatra, through Pamalayu expedition. In 1200 CE, Mpu Jatmika from Java established the Hindu Kingdom of Negara Dipa by the river of Tapin; this was the start of the Javanese-style courts in South Kalimantan.

Followed by the expansion of Majapahit empire circa 14th-century, the archipelago saw again the Javanese expansion. It was probably during this period that some of Javanese cultural elements, such as gamelan and kris, being expanded and introduced to islands outside of Java; such as Sumatra, the Malay Peninsula and Borneo. It was during this era that the town Banjarmasin in South Kalimantan and Sukadana in West Kalimantan has been established as Javanese colony as the vassal of Majapahit. In 1400 CE, Negara Dipa was succeeded by the Hindu Kingdom of Negara Daha. The Javanese influences can be seen on Banjar people art, culture, and costumes that demonstrated Javanese styles.

It was also during the last period of Majapahit in the 15th century that the native Austronesian elements of pre Hindu-Javanese style were revived, as demonstrated in Sukuh and Cetho temples. The stiffer wayang style figures of statues and bas reliefs, and the stepped pyramid temple structure replaced the classic towering Hindu temples. This reverse of Indianised kingdom process is also called the "Javanisation" of Hindu-Buddhist prototypes in Javanese art.

=== Later history: Demak and Mataram ===
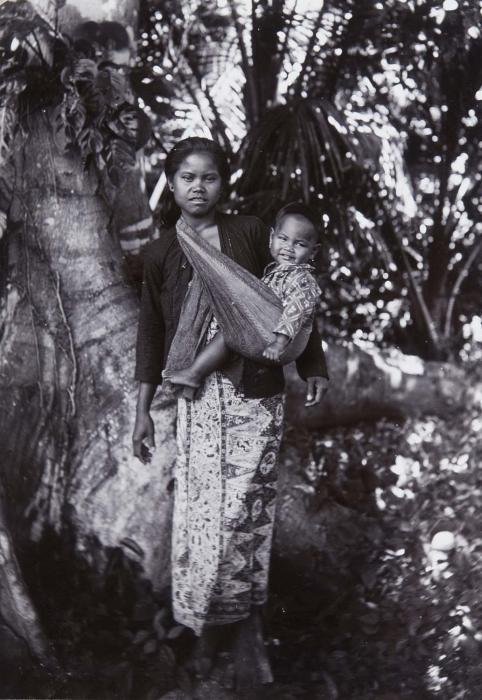
The Javanese diaspora, such as those to Suriname in Dutch colonial period, also contributed to the spread of Javanese culture.

After the fall of Majapahit, Demak Sultanate replace its hegemony in Southern Sumatra by appointing Javanese regent to rule Palembang. In the early 17th century, the Sultanate of Palembang was established by Ki Gede ing Suro, a Javanese nobleman fleeing the Demak court intrigue after the death of Trenggana Sultan of Demak. The Sultanate of Palembang are known as the combination of various cultures; Malay, Javanese, Islamic and Chinese. The Javanisation process of Palembang Sultanate court is evident in the adoption of Javanese words and vocabularies into local Malay Palembang dialect, such as wong (people) and banyu (water).

During the ambitious Sultan Agung's reign of Mataram Sultanate in the first half of the 17th century, Javanese culture again expanded, much of western and eastern region of Java are being Javanised. Mataram's campaign on eastern Javanese principalities such as Surabaya and Pasuruan expanded Mataraman influences on Java. Mataram expansion includes Sundanese principalities of Priangan highlands; from Galuh Ciamis, Garut, Sumedang, Bandung, and Cianjur. It was during this period that Sundanese people were exposed and assimilated further into Javanese Kejawen culture. The successful Javanization of Sundanese people can be seen in the examples of the sultanates of Cirebon and Banten. Where the rulers and people were of Sundanese descent but assimilated themselves as Javanese and spoke his language. Wayang golek are Sundanese taking on Javanese wayang kulit culture, similar shared culture such as gamelan and batik also flourished. It is probably during this times that Sundanese language began to adopt the stratified degree of term and vocabulary to denote politeness, as reflected in Javanese language. In addition, Javanese scripts also used to write Sundanese as cacarakan.

Foreign influences and ideas such as religions and beliefs are sometimes consciously and deliberately undergone changes and adaptations, being "Javanised" to be accepted by popular Javanese audiences. The examples such as the process that took place in the 15th century dubbed as "the Islamisation of Java and the Javanisation of Islam." The Wali Sangas such as Sunan Kalijaga are known to use Javanese cultural expressions such as gamelan and wayang to promote and spread Islamic faith. Wayang sadat is a variant of wayang that used to in tabligh and da'wah to spread Islamic messages. Another example Javanisation of Islam in Java is the construction of tajug pyramidal multi-tiered roof of Javanese mosque. Javanese mosque did not applied dome, minaret, brick or stone masonry, but instead adopted wood carpentry of pendopo and meru-like roofs derived from previous pre-Islamic art and architecture of Java. The example of this kinds of mosque are Demak Great Mosque and Yogyakarta Grand Mosque.

Javanization of religious buildings

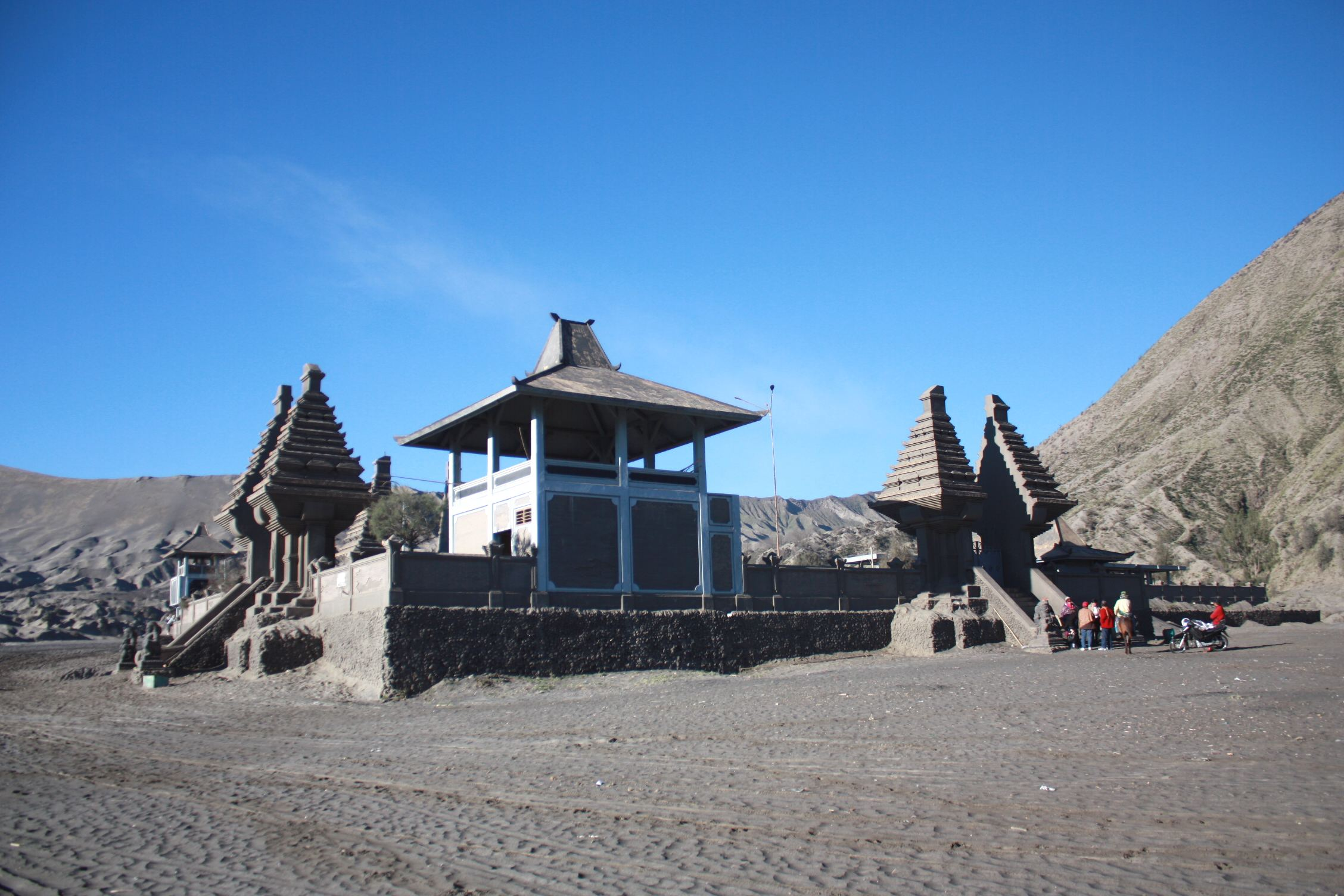
A Hindu temple Pura Poten, Bromo

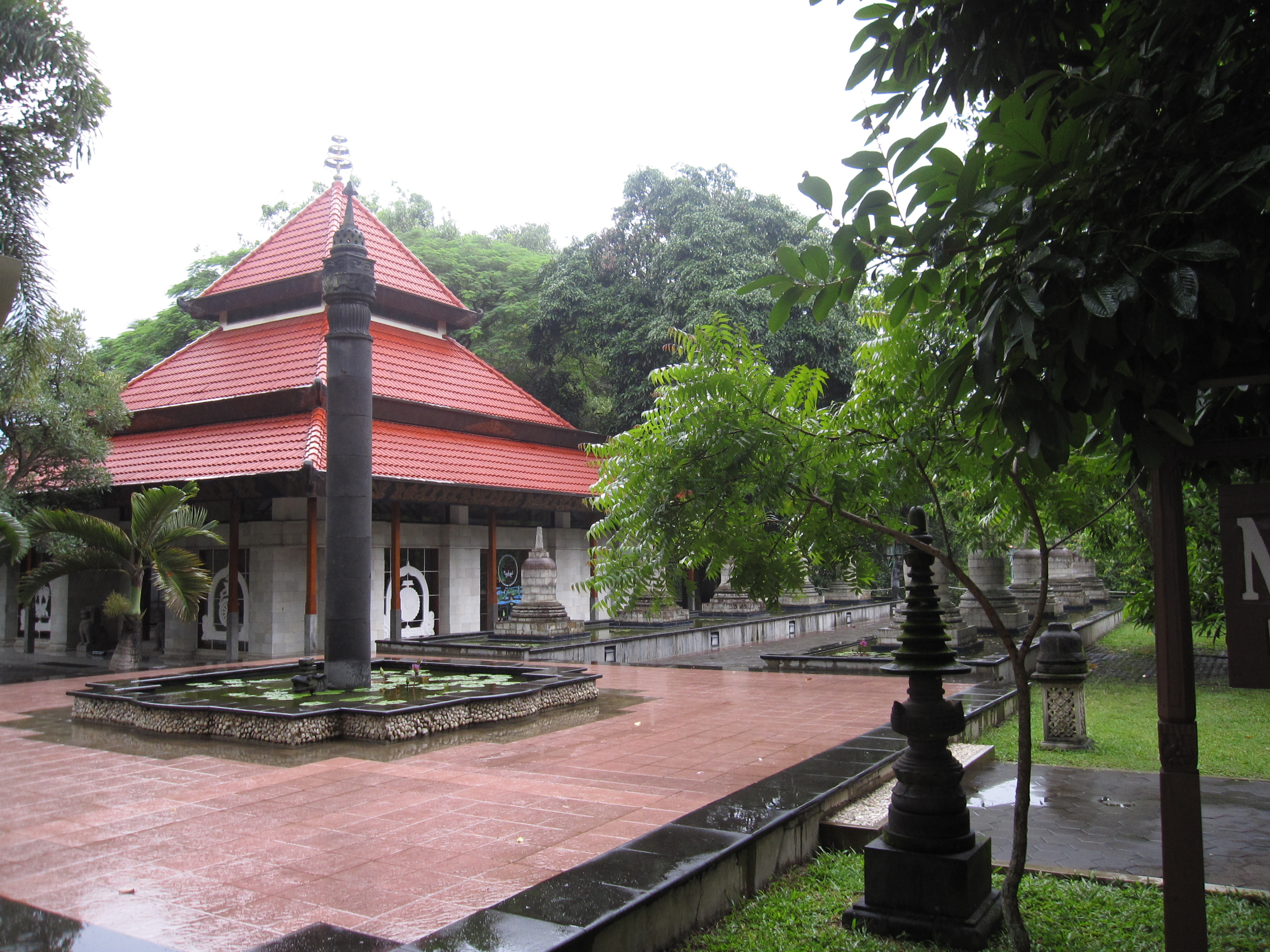
Mendut Vihara, a Buddhist monastery near Mendut temple, Magelang

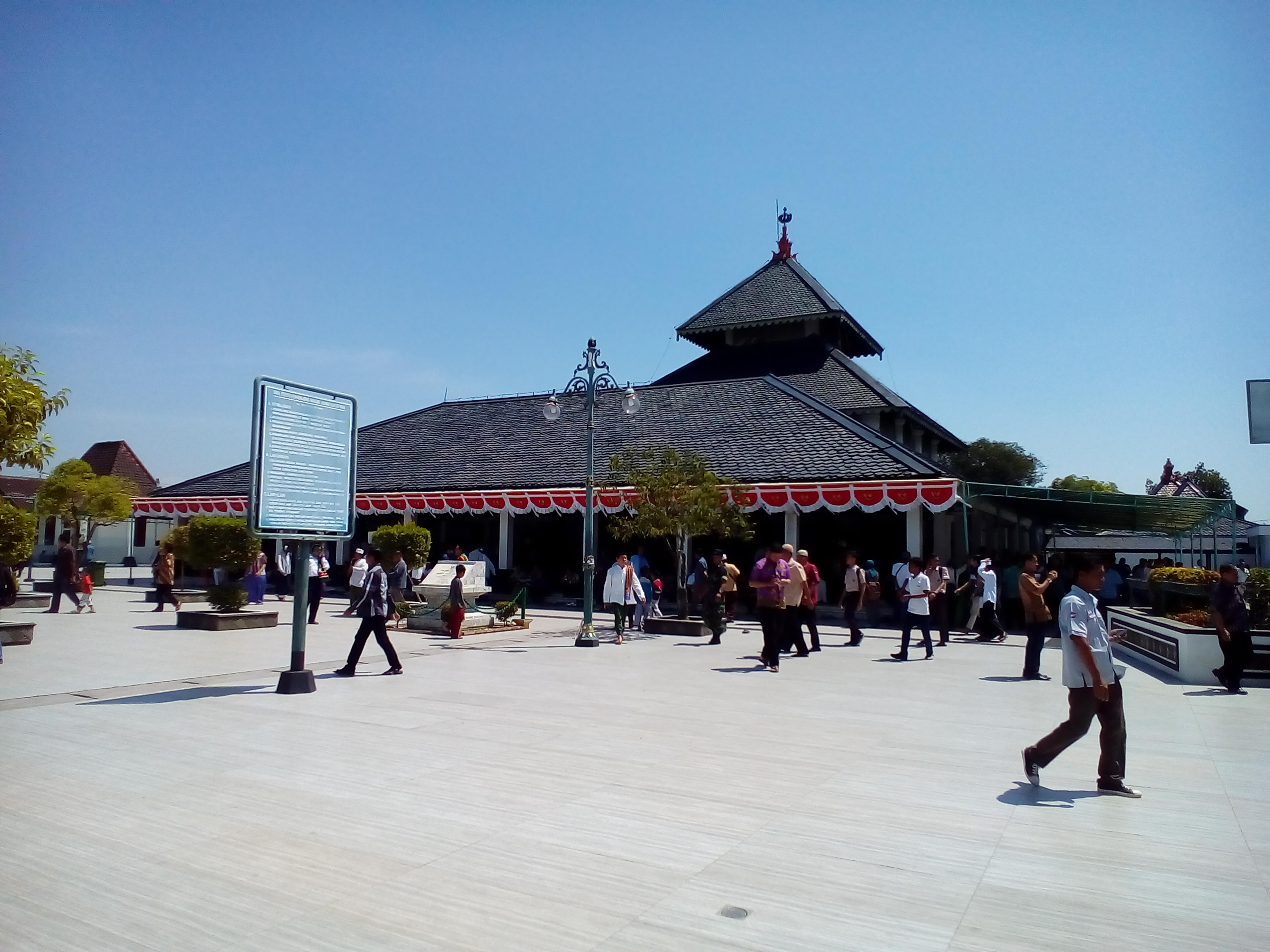
Demak Great Mosque displaying a meru-like multi-tiered roof

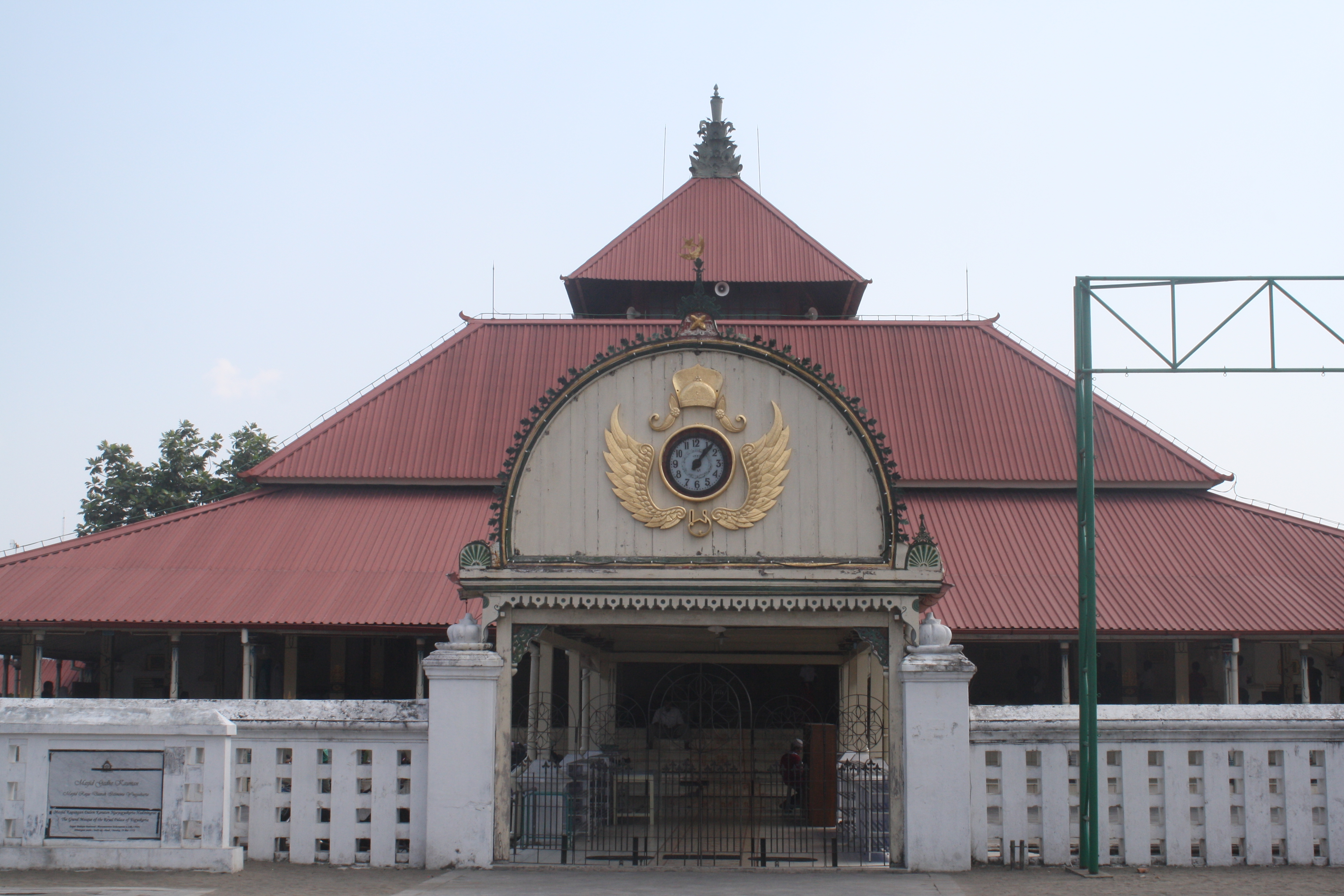
Masjid Gedhe Kauman in Yogyakarta, build in traditional Javanese multi-tiered roof

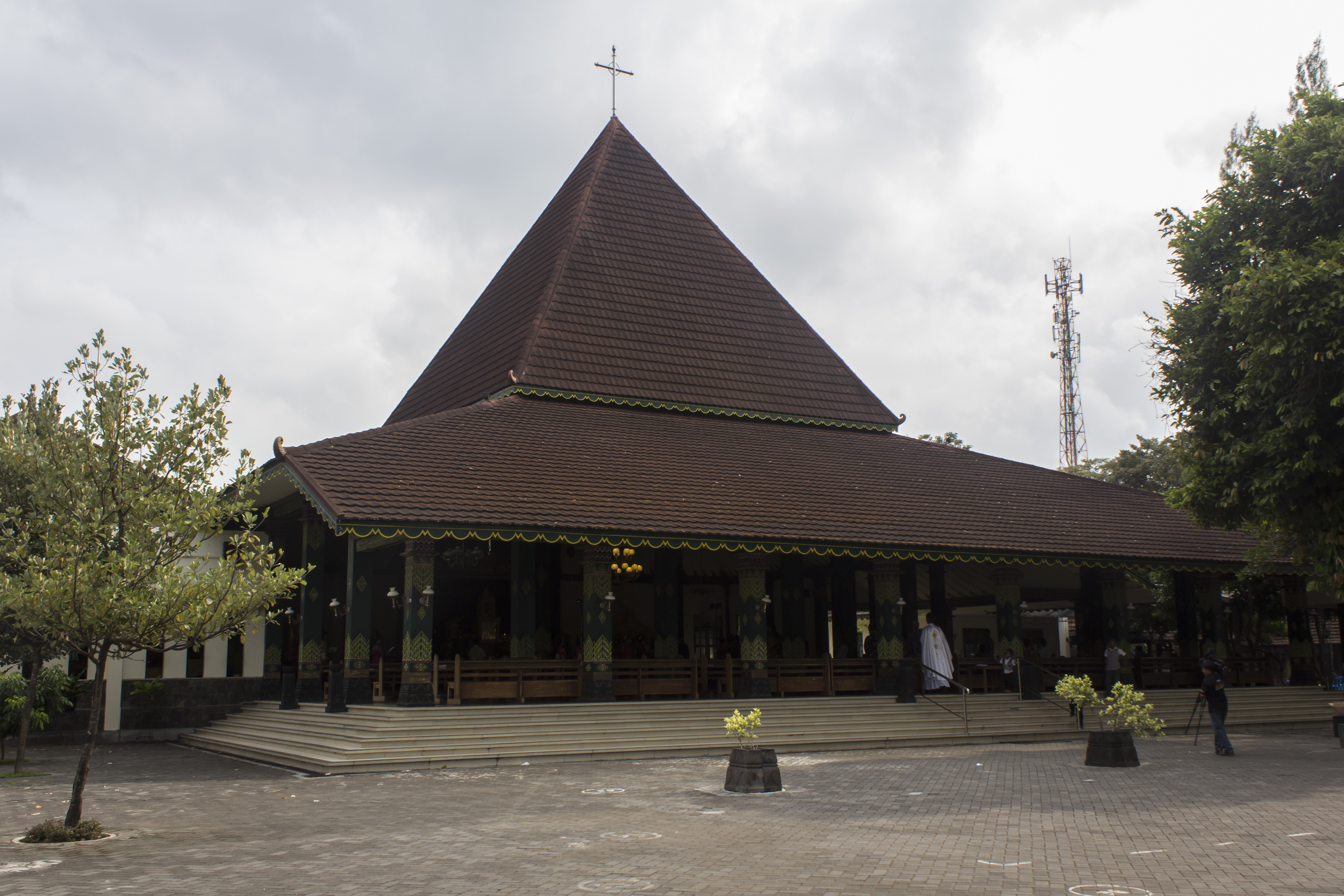
Ganjuran Church in Bantul, built in traditional Javanese architecture

=== Colonial history ===
During colonial Dutch East Indies period, numbers of Javanese are migrated to Suriname as plantation workers. Within the archipelago, Javanese are also migrate to several places such as Sumatra, Kalimantan and Johor in Malay peninsula. Regions such as northern West Java, Lampung and East Kalimantan are known to have large numbers of Javanese settlers.

Catholics faith for examples are also using Javanese vocabularies and frame of reference by using the term romo (Javanese: father) for "father" to refer to Catholic priest. Catholic proselytising efforts also used traditional wayang art to spread their message; the wayang wahyu used to perform the biblical story and Christianity. In architecture, Catholicism also adopted Javanese style and architecture for their church, such as the Ganjuran Church in Bantul, Yogyakarta, that constructed the shrine of Jesus in ancient Javanese candi architecture. Another example includes Pohsarang Church in Kediri that built in traditional Javanese architecture.

In 1918, a debate of Volksraad between Tjipto Mangoenkoesomo and Soetatmo Soriokoesomo discussed the Indies nationalism and Javanese nationalism. Soetatmo Soriokoesomo supported the Javanese nationalism on basis of common culture, language and history of Javanese, while Indies nationalism were non-exist and no more than a reaction to Dutch colonialisation. Meanwhile, Tjipto Mangoenkoesomo argued that Java had lost its sovereignty under Dutch, so the fatherland was the Indies.

=== Modern history ===
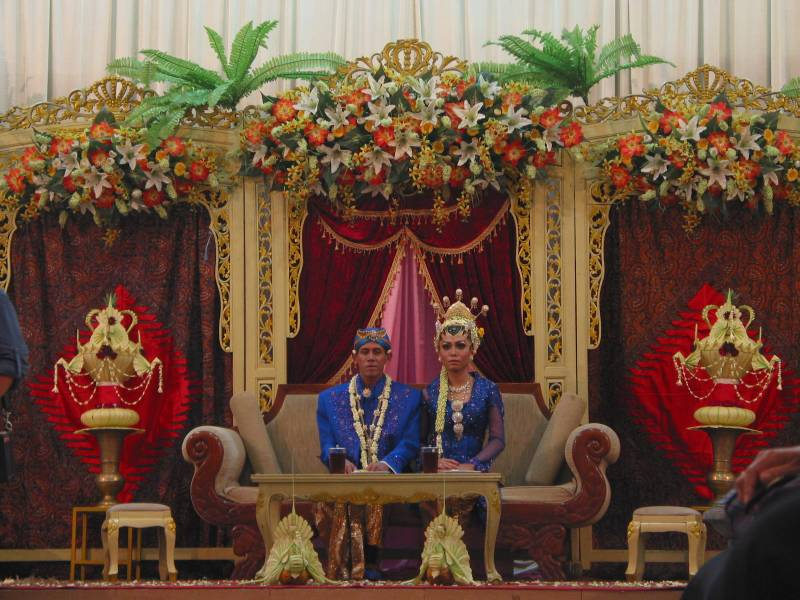
Javanese cultural identity were reinforced through traditional ceremonies, such as Javanese wedding.

After the Indonesian revolution (1945–1949) and the independence of Indonesia, many of Indonesian national symbols are derived from its Majapahit legacy, an empire that centred in Java in 14th to 15th century. Indonesian flag displayed Majapahit colours, the national motto Bhinneka Tunggal Ika and the state ideology Pancasila also demonstrates its Majapahit legacy. Indonesian founding fathers, especially Sukarno did dig into Indonesian past of indigenous wisdom and philosophy to formulate the new nationhood of Indonesia. Naturally Javanese culture as one of the most influential major element in Indonesian culture contributed its share of influences.

During Suharto's New Order regime (1966–1998), the political culture of Indonesia was somewhat perceived as being Javanised. The administration levels were also arranged in Javanese styles and idioms, such as Kabupaten and desa, the terms that were originally not familiar in some of Indonesian provinces, such as West Sumatra and Irian Jaya. In this post-independence Indonesia sense, the term "Javanisation" is used to describe the process whereby ethnic Javanese and Javanised individuals gradually became the overwhelming and disproportionate majority of the governing elite in the Indonesian post-independence era.

== Criticism ==
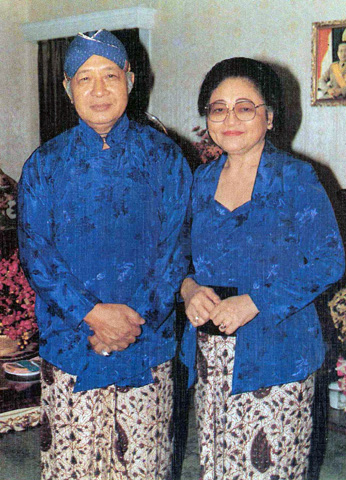
Suharto and wife, Tien, in traditional Javanese attire. His authoritarian New Order regime has been criticised as "Javanising" Indonesian politics.

The issue of Javanisation has been a sensitive and critical issues in Indonesian national building and national unity. The Javanese domination is regarded not only on the realm of culture, but also social, politics and economy. David Leonard Thornton published a thesis in 1972 titled Javanization of Indonesian Politics, which suggests that ethnic Javanese has disproportionately dominate many important positions in Indonesian government. The Suharto's New Order regime is criticised as has Javanised Indonesian politics during decades of his rules. In politics, administration, authority and civil service perspective, this Javanisation is sometimes perceived negatively as it contains the worst elements of Javanese culture, such as rigidity of social hierarchy, authoritarianism and arbitrariness. A development that sometimes called as "Mataramisation" and "feudalisation", accompanied by fondness of status display and arrogance. A typical negative description of priyayi behaving like the member of Javanese upper class.

The Transmigration program that relocate people from densely populated Java to other Indonesian islands, such as Sumatra, Kalimantan, Sulawesi, and Indonesian New Guinea, is also criticised has accelerated and promoted the Javanisation process of Indonesia. Despite of the claim, the impact of sponsored migration of transmigration is far less important, hence the link between demographic pressure and emigration is much more complex. The issue also fuels with development disparity issues, where other islands are dissatisfied with the development and social welfare in their region, in contrast with infrastructure development and wealth distribution that seems to be in favour and focused on Java.

However, today in the era of local autonomy, it is not relevant to connect the transmigration program to Javanisation issues, because the migration process is also conducted internally within Java, or within certain provinces. For example currently Central Java is the largest source of migrants in Indonesia to other provinces, with most of Central Javanese heading to Greater Jakarta, West Java, and Banten regions. While in Eastern Indonesia such as in Maluku and Papua, the majority of the non-native settlers are from Sulawesi (Bugis-Makassar and Buton) and Maluku itself, and not from Java. The transmigration should carefully examine economic potential, as well as social and cultural impact of the area. It is also based on the fact that the provinces which open themselves to pluralism and accept inter-province settlers and migrations are usually developing more rapidly compared to those that isolate themselves.

Java itself has attracted perantau (migrant settlers) and workers from all over the Indonesian archipelago, and subsequently the demographics of Java are not homogenous. For example, certain ethnic groups with strong migration culture, such as Minang people hailed from West Sumatra, Batak from North Sumatra, and Bugis from South Sulawesi, has migrated to and settled in Java for generations, although majority of them are attracted to Greater Jakarta area.

== See also ==
- Hinduism in Java
- Indonesian Esoteric Buddhism
- Kejawèn
- Malayisation
- Indianised kingdom
