= Kramanisation =

Process of Indonesian language stratification

Kramanisation is a term introduced by Benedict Anderson to describe the process of language stratification in Indonesian. The Indonesian language, which believed as an egalitarian and democratic language, has been developing the division of registers into the low-level speech and high-level speech as found in Javanese. This kind of language leveling is said to be the effect of the Javanisation of the Indonesian language.

== Overview ==
Unlike Javanese, Malay language as the origin of Indonesian is considered a democratic language for not having stratified speech levels. However, in its modern development, the Indonesia language demonstrates the indication of polarised language registers, which divided it into high-level speech "the polite and formal Indonesian" and low-level speech "the everyday and informal Indonesian". This is believed to be the impact of strong Javanese influence in the Indonesian political landscape. The Javanese language and way of thinking gradually penetrate the Indonesian language, making it having Indonesian equivalents to Krama or the high-level Javanese and Ngoko or the low-level Javanese. This process occurs without the massive absorption of tangible elements of the Javanese language, instead, it is the Javanese language modality that affects Indonesian heavily.

As a consequence of establishing Indonesian krama, the Indonesian ngoko also comes into place. Meanwhile, the formal and standard Indonesian becomes the krama of Indonesian, the Jakartan language, to some extent, is believed to be the new-ngoko of the Indonesian language.
