= Ganjuran Church =

Catholic church in Yogyakarta, Indonesia

- Church of the Sacred Heart of Jesus; Gereja Hati Kudus Yesus; Gereja Ganjuran
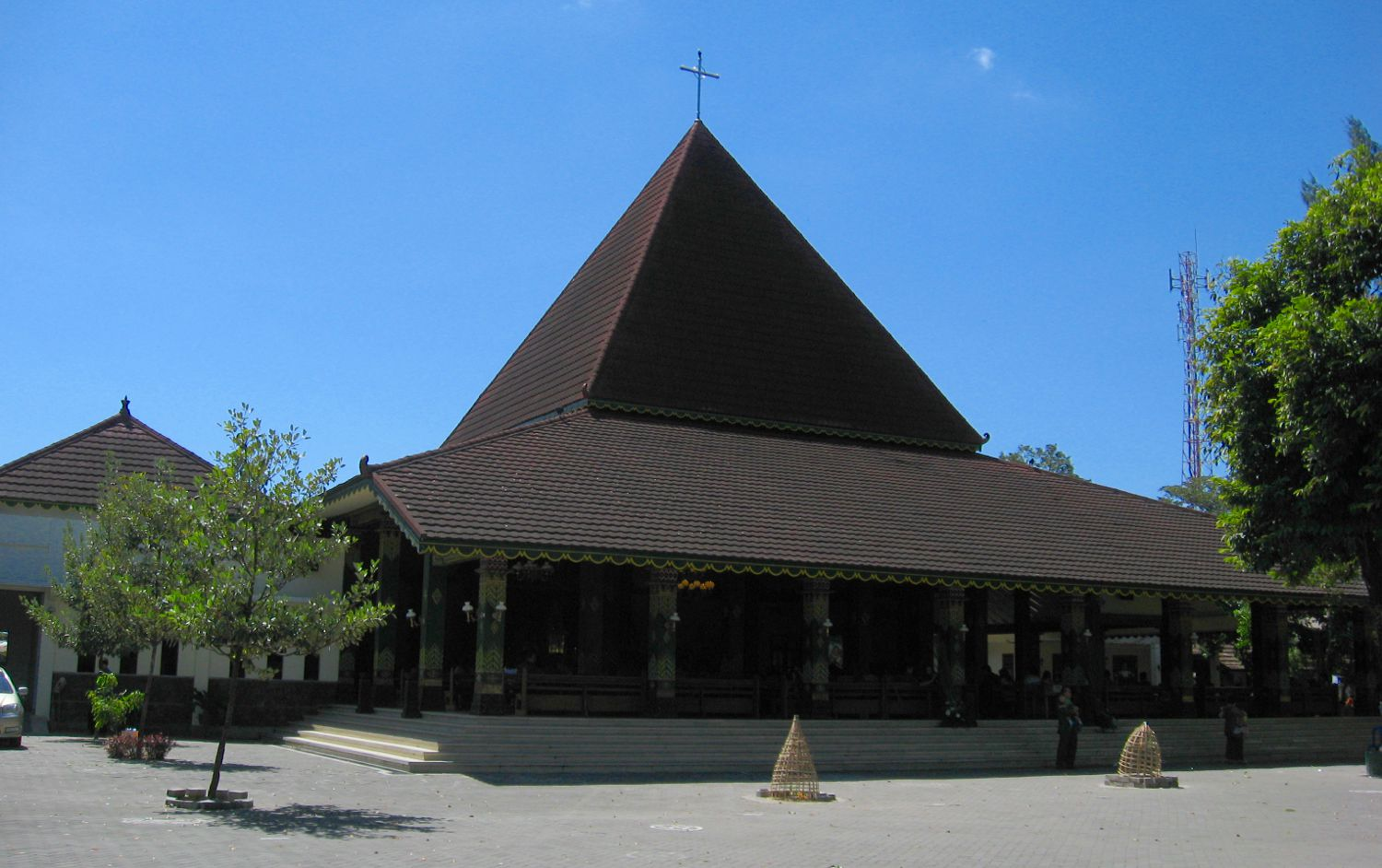
- Exterior of the church, from the front
- Ganjuran Church
- 7°55′35.69″S 110°19′8.38″E
- Location: Ganjuran, Bambanglipuro, Bantul Regency, Special Region of Yogyakarta
- Country: Indonesia
- Denomination: Roman Catholic

History
- Status: Parish church
- Founded: 16 April 1924
- Founder: Schmutzer family
- Dedication: Sacred Heart of Jesus

Architecture
- Functional status: Active
- Architectural type: Javanese; European

Administration
- Archdiocese: Semarang
- Parish: Ganjuran

The Church of the Sacred Heart of Jesus (Indonesian: Gereja Hati Kudus Yesus), also known as the Ganjuran Church (Gereja Ganjuran), is a Roman Catholic church located in Ganjuran, Bantul, Special Region of Yogyakarta, Indonesia. It is the oldest church in its administrative regency.

The church was established on 16 April 1924 by the Schmutzer family, who owned a sugar factory in the area. From a total of 25 Catholics in the area in 1922, the congregation has expanded to 8,000 in 2011. The building has seen many modifications, including reconstruction after the 2006 Yogyakarta earthquake. Much critical commentary has been made on its Javanese design, and the church continues to include Javanese culture in its liturgy.

== Description ==
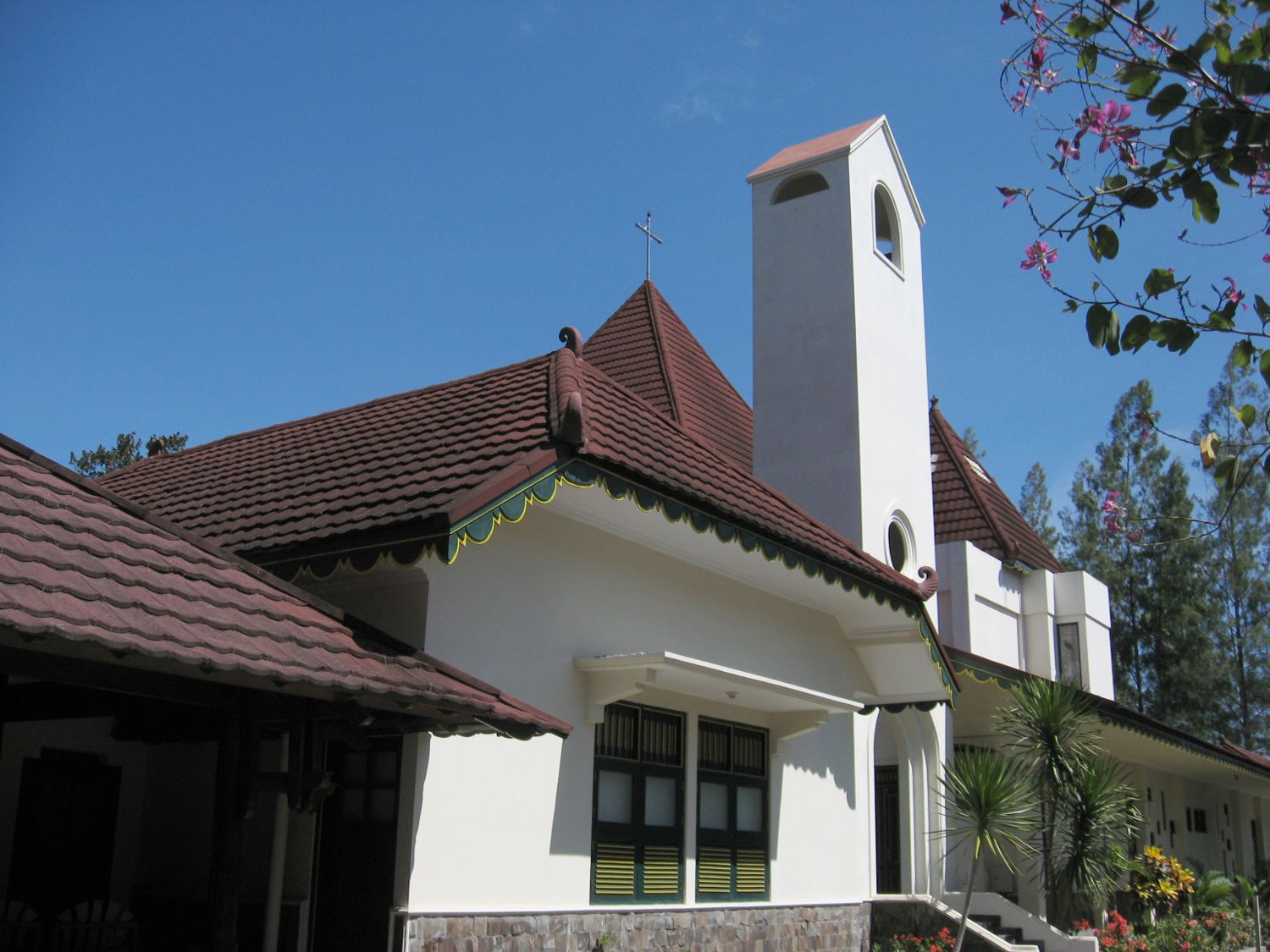
Exterior of the church

Ganjuran Church is located in Ganjuran, Bambanglipuro, Bantul, 17 kilometres (11 mi) south of Yogyakarta. It is built on 2.5 hectares (6.2 acres) of land and in addition to the church has a parking lot, temple (candi), residence for pastors, and other maintenance buildings. As of 2011, its total congregation is 8,000, consisting mostly of farmers, merchants, and labourers.

The main church building is a joglo and is decorated with 600 square metres (6,500 sq ft) of traditional Javanese carvings, including parallelograms known as wajikan and wooden pineapples. The altar features angels dressed as wayang orang characters. Because of this architecture, the Dutch scholar of Indonesia M. C. Ricklefs has described the church at Ganjuran as perhaps one of the most dramatic manifestations of the Catholic Church's accommodations of Javanese culture, while the scholars Jan S. Aritonang and Karel A. Steenbrink described the church as "the most spectacular product of ... European-guided indigenous art".

== History ==
The land on which Ganjuran Church is now located was once part of a sugar factory, run by the Dutch brothers Joseph and Julius Schmutzer. In 1912 they began practising workers' rights as outlined in the encyclical Rerum novarum; they then began working on establishing educational facilities on the land, with seven boys' schools opened in 1919 and a girls' school opened in 1920. They also promoted Catholicism amongst their employees. With the proceeds from their factory, the Schmutzers established St Elisabeth Hospital in Ganjuran, first as a clinic. They also established Onder de Bogen (now Panti Rapih Hospital) in Yogyakarta proper. St Elisabeth is now managed by the Order of Carolus Borromeus.

Also in 1920, Pr. van Driessch, a member of the Society of Jesus who had taught at Xaverius College in Muntilan, began giving sermons and working to establish a Catholic community in the area. By 1922 there were 22 native Javanese Catholics, a number that increased rapidly. On 16 April 1924 the Schmutzers established a church on their grounds, with van Driessch as its first pastor. The carvings and other facets were worked on by a Javanese sculptor named Iko.

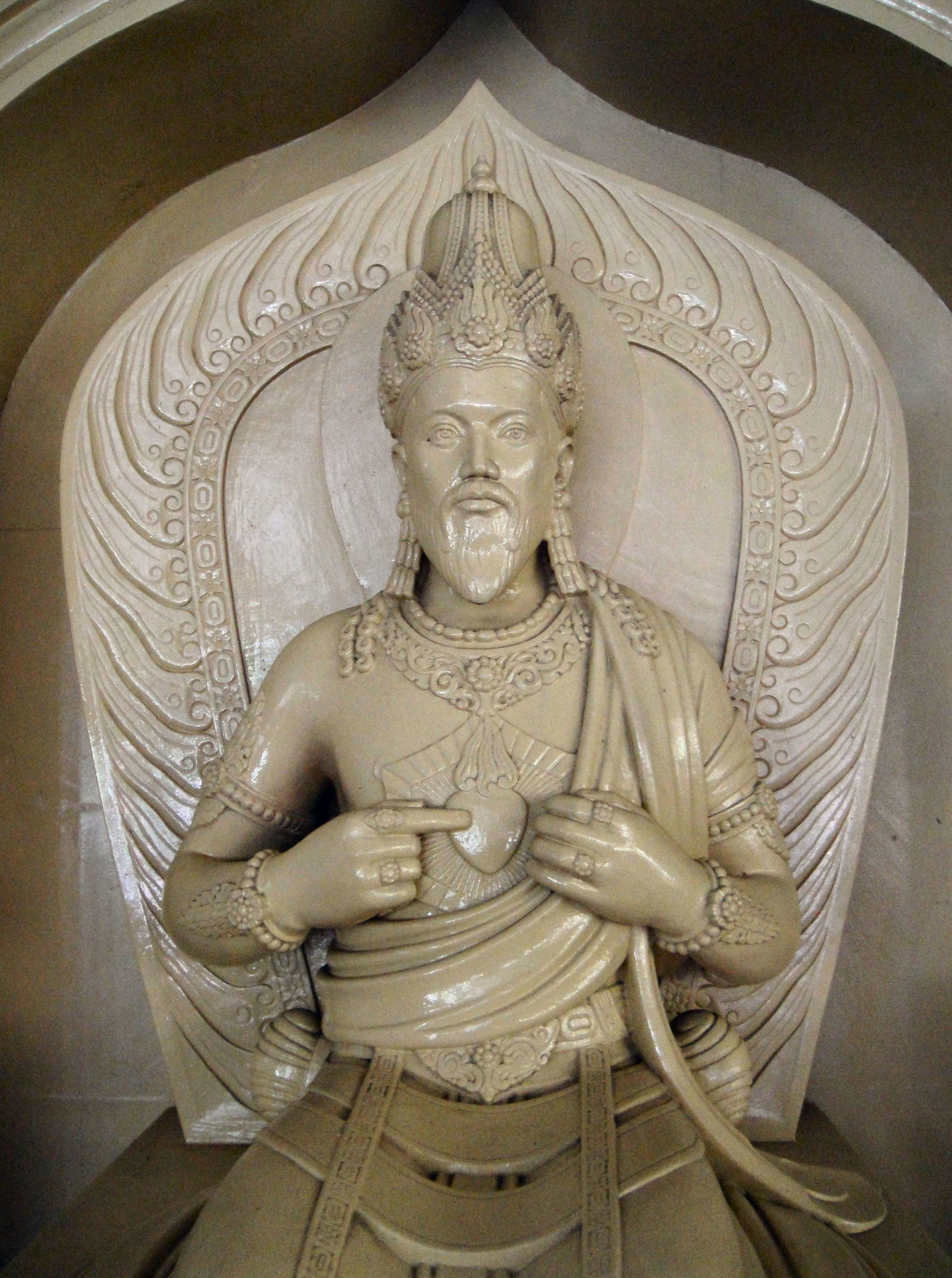
Depiction of Jesus as a Javanese king

Three years later the congregation began construction of a 10-metre (33 ft) tall Hindu-styled temple (candi), resembling the one at Prambanan Temple; Iko set statues of Mary and Jesus as Javanese royalty and teachers, which were adorned with batik motives. Stones were taken from the slopes of Mount Merapi to the north, while the entrance was pointed to southern sea; this orientation reflected a Javanese belief in the harmony between north and south. The temple was consecrated on 11 February 1930 by Bishop of Batavia Antonius van Velsen.

Van Driessch died in 1934 and was replaced by Jesuit Father Albertus Soegijapranata as pastor; Soegijapranata served concurrently as pastor of Ganjuran and Bintaran. In this year the congregation totalled 1,350 people. The Schmutzers returned to the Netherlands that year. During the Indonesian National Revolution the sugar factory was razed, but the schools, church, and hospital survived. In 1947 Fr. Justinus Darmojuwono became pastor, serving until 1950.

In 1981 the accommodations for pastors were expanded under Suryosudarmo, and seven years later, under Fr. Gregorius Utomo, the church began emphasising its Javanese influences. In 1990, the Federation of Asian Bishops' Conferences held a conference on agriculture and farmers' issues. Since 1995 the church has focused on its temple, and through donations has added reliefs depicting fifteen Stations of the Cross; the reliefs had initially been planned by the Schmutzers. After the old church was destroyed in the 2006 Yogyakarta earthquake, the church was redesigned in a Javanese style. The reconstruction cost Rp 7 billion (US$900,000).

Activities at the church include regular Mass, economic programmes, and celebrations of special events. Liturgy can be in Javanese or Indonesian, and at times Javanese attire is required. There may also be gamelan music and keroncong performances.

== Gallery ==
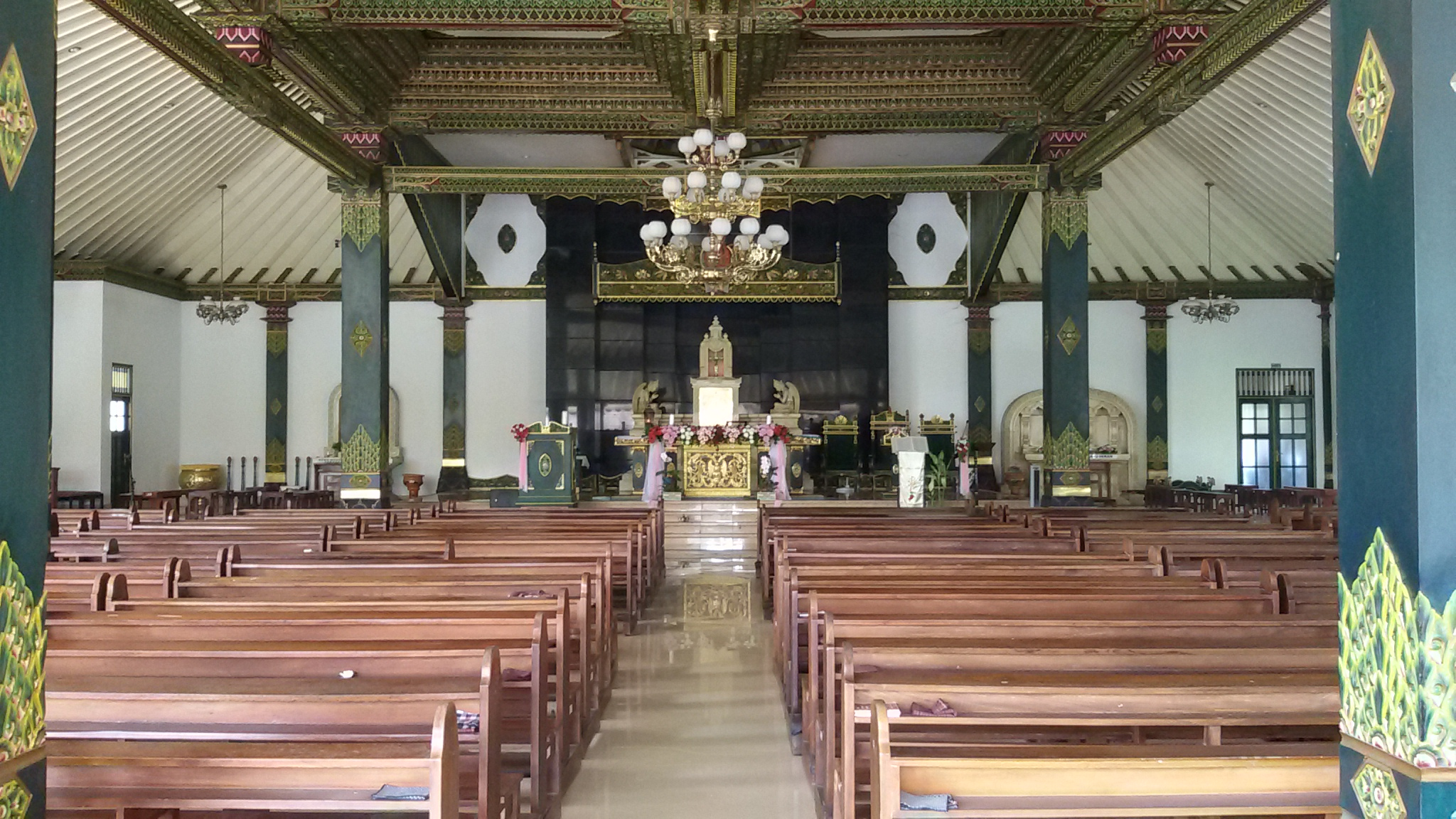
Church interior

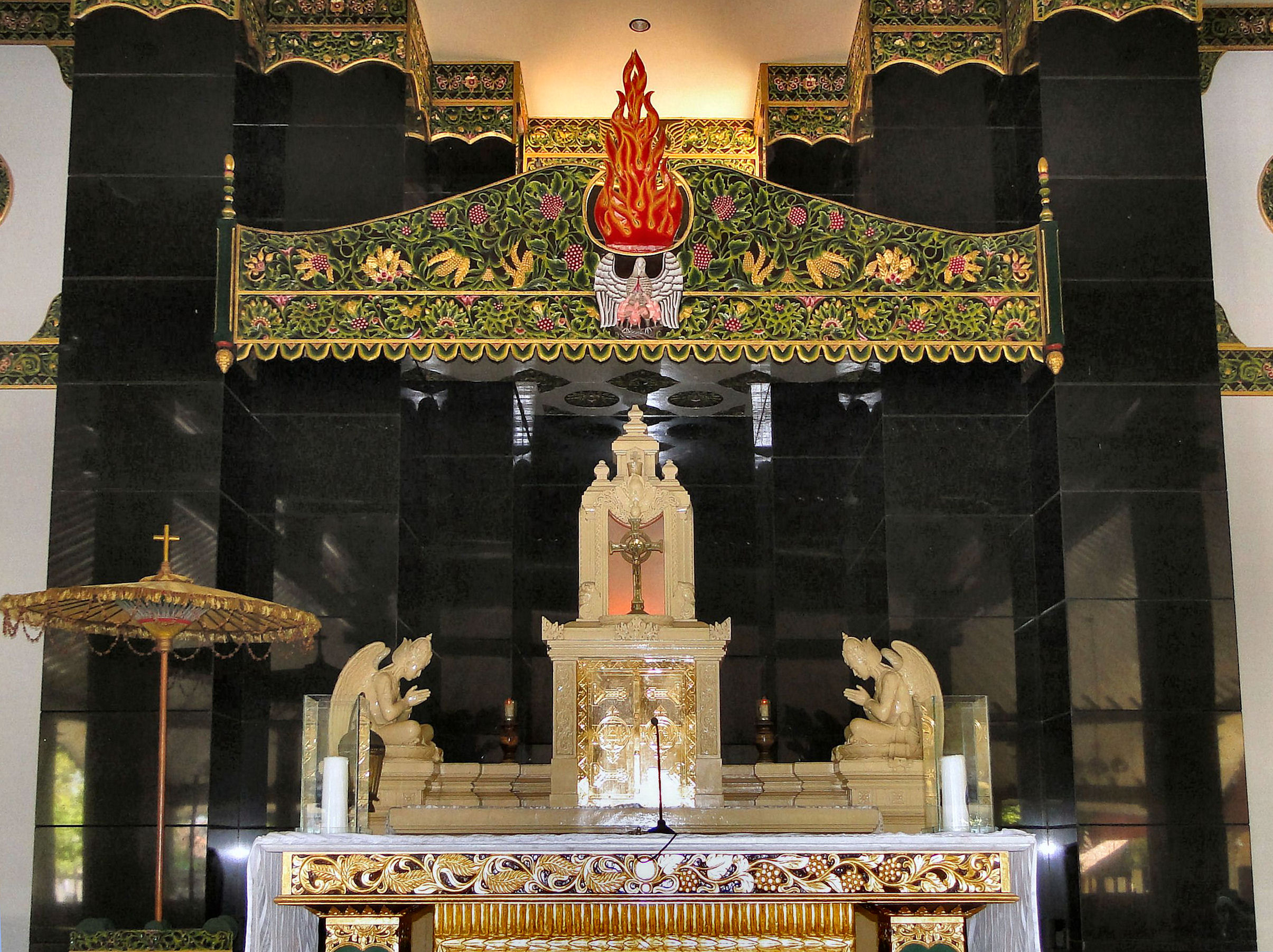
High altar with Javanese angels/cherubs

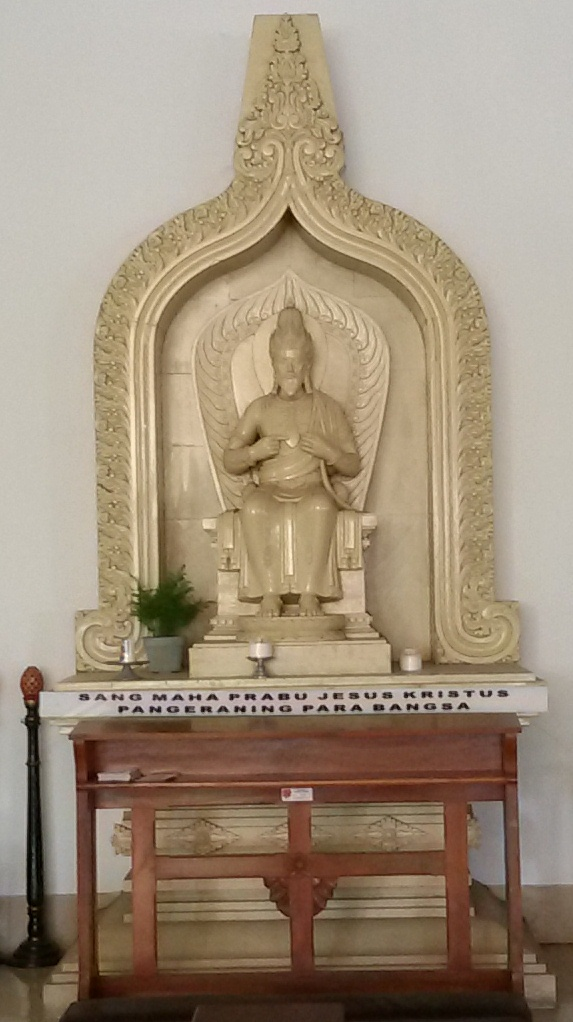
The altar of Sang Maha Prabu Yesus Kristus Pangeraning Para Bangsa (Our Lord Jesus Christ, King of all Nations)

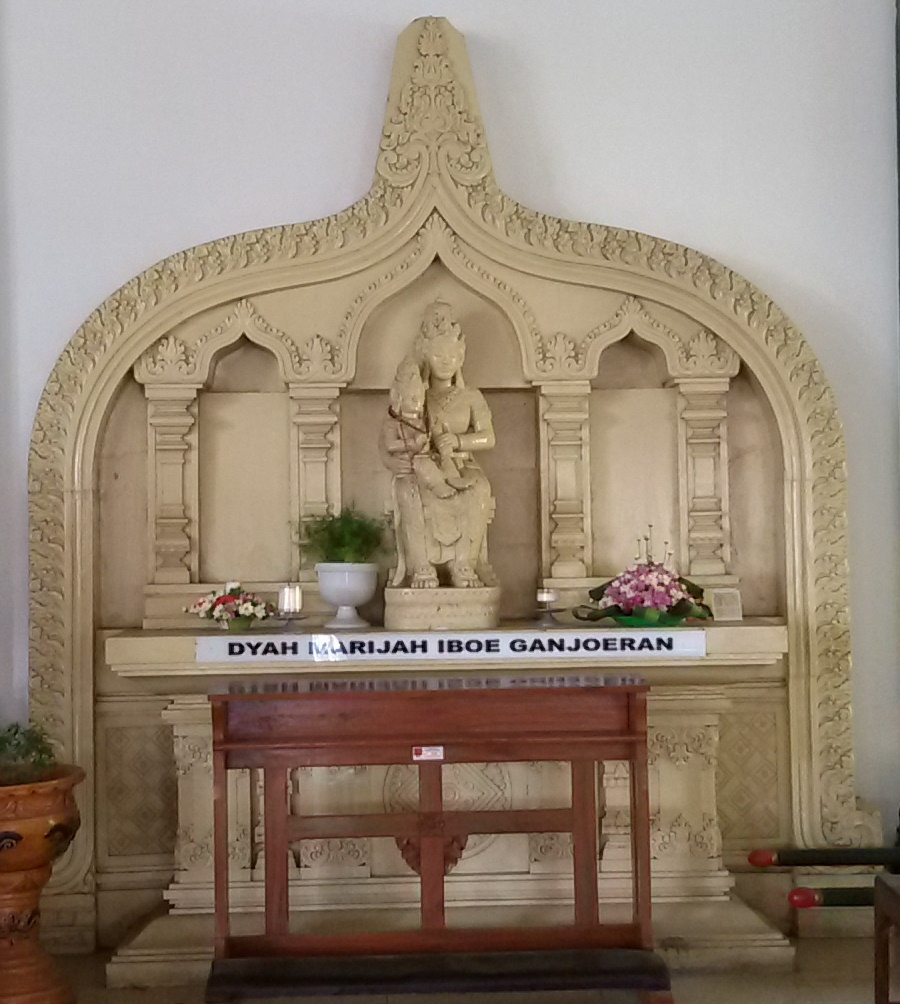
The altar of Dyah Mariyah Ibu Ganjuran (Our Lady, Mother of Ganjuran)

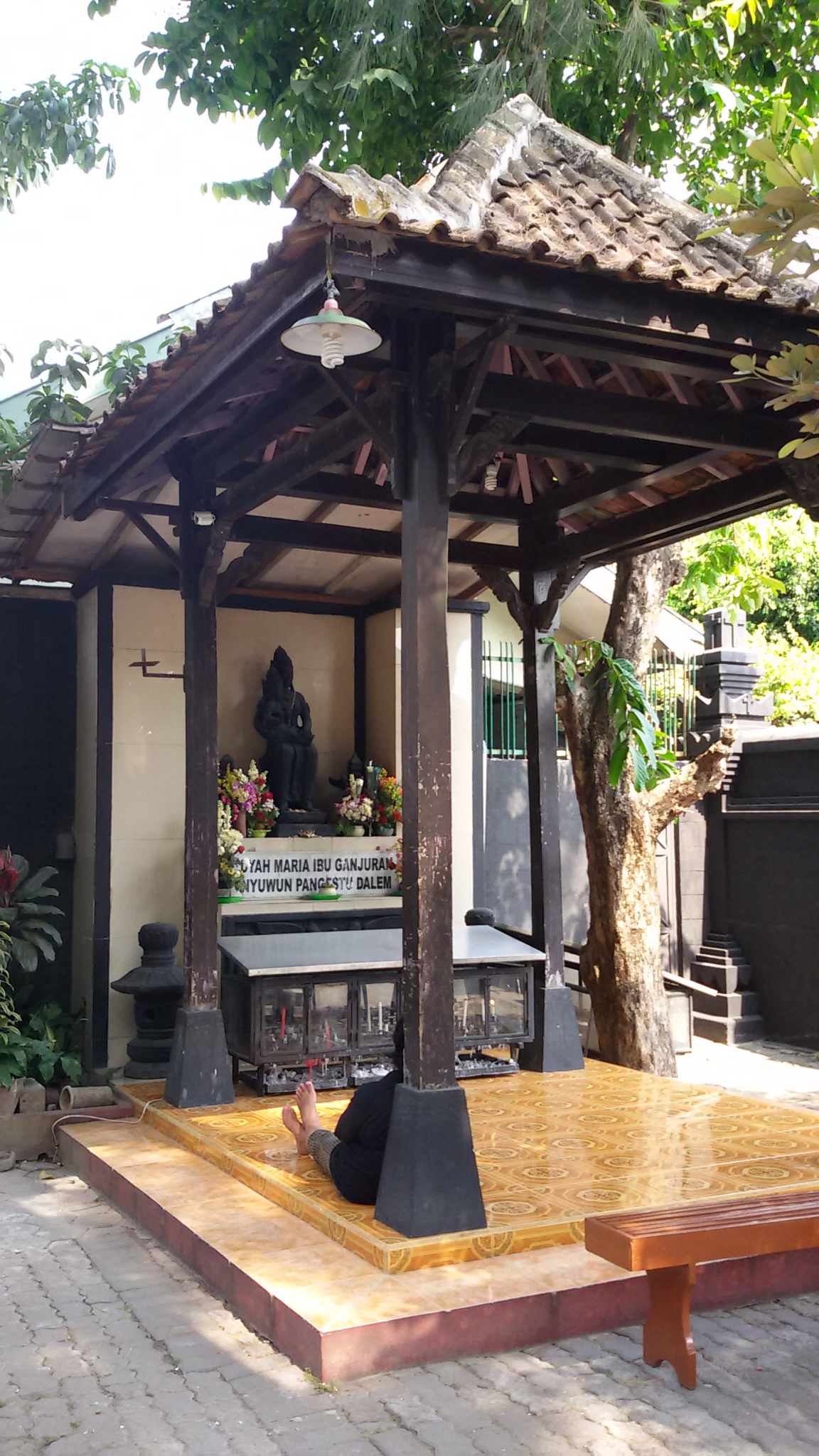
Marian grotto of the church

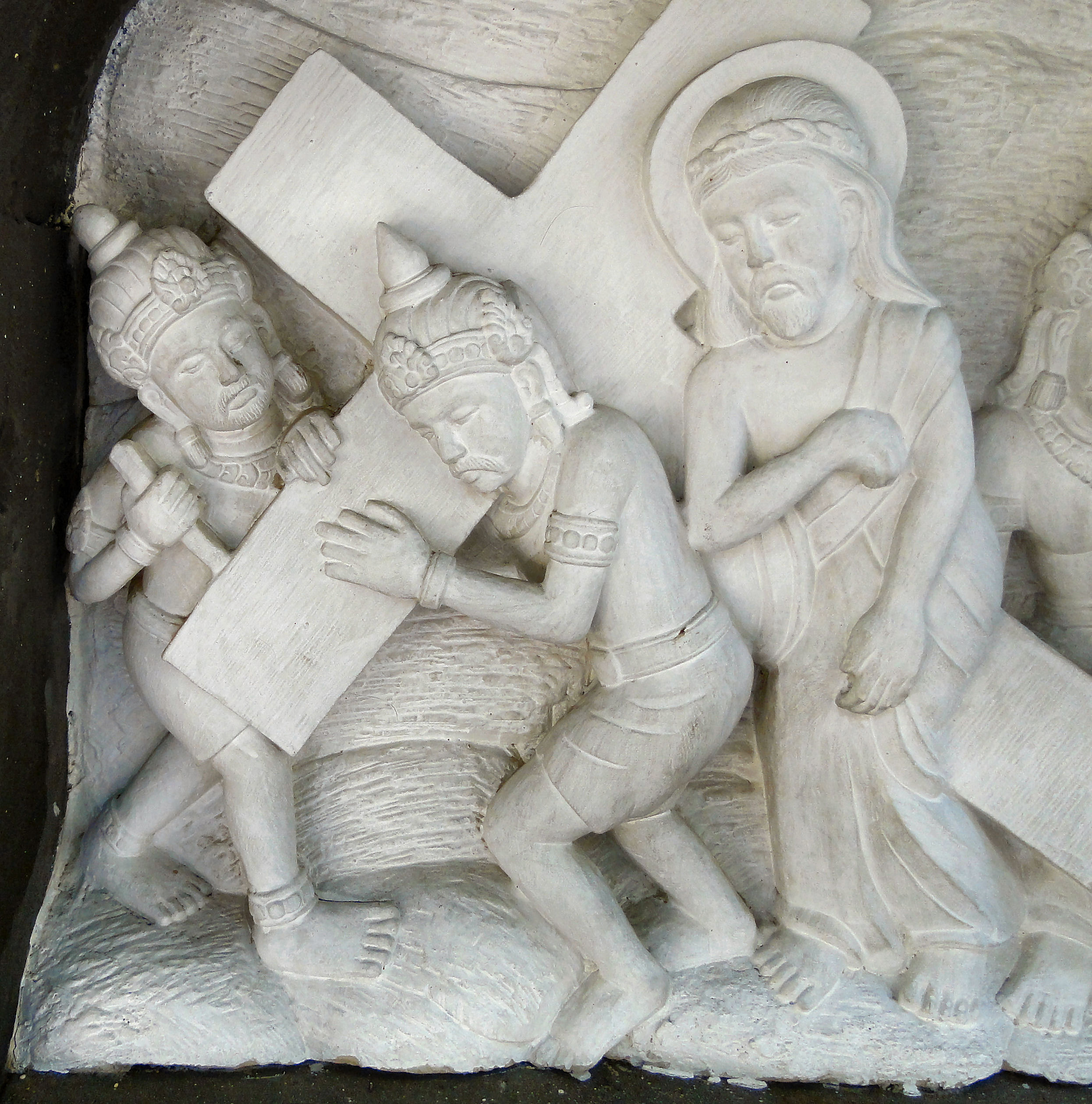
Stations of the Cross, Javanese-Christian style

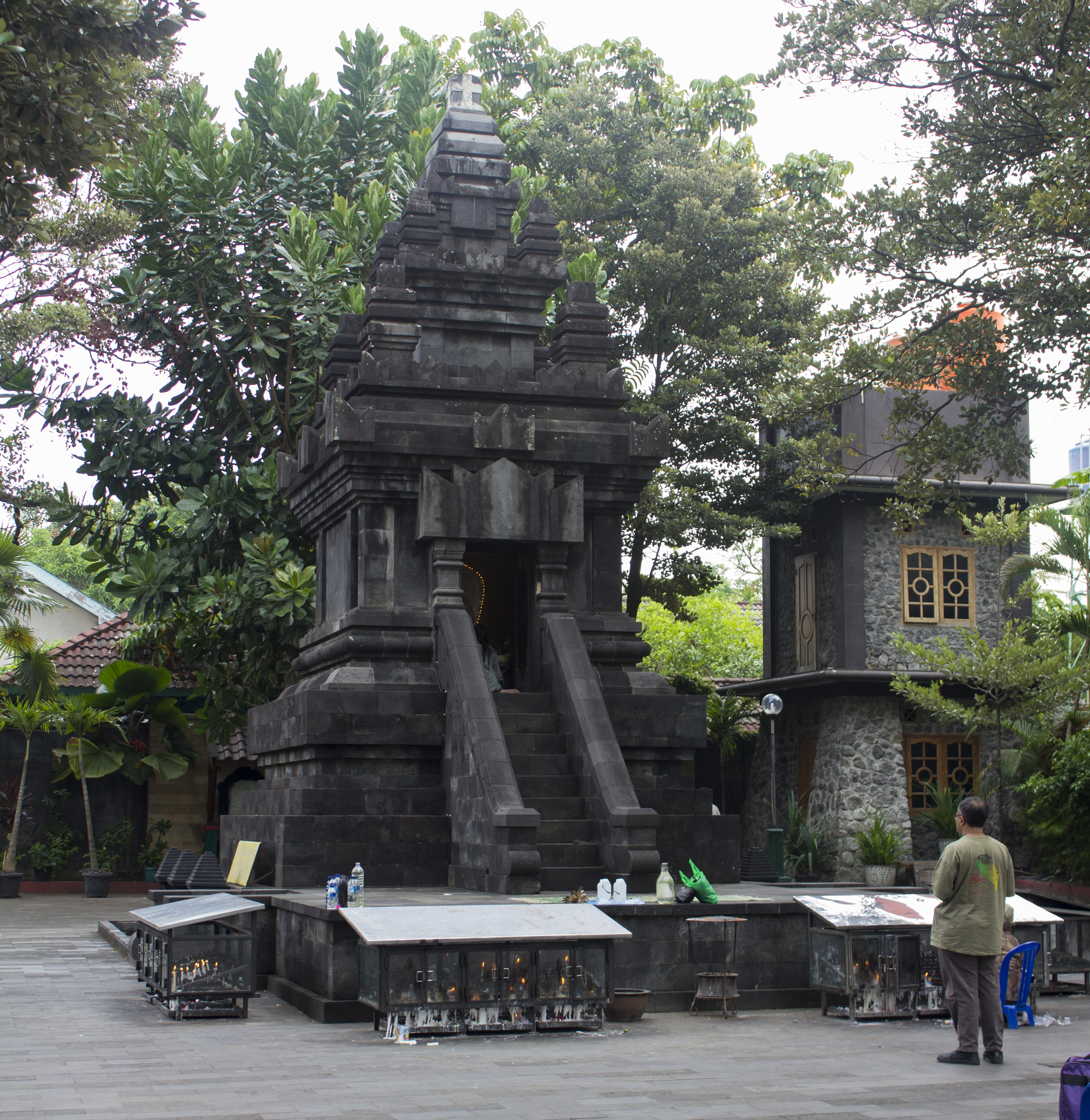
Hindu-style temple at the church, the main shrine of the Sacred Heart.

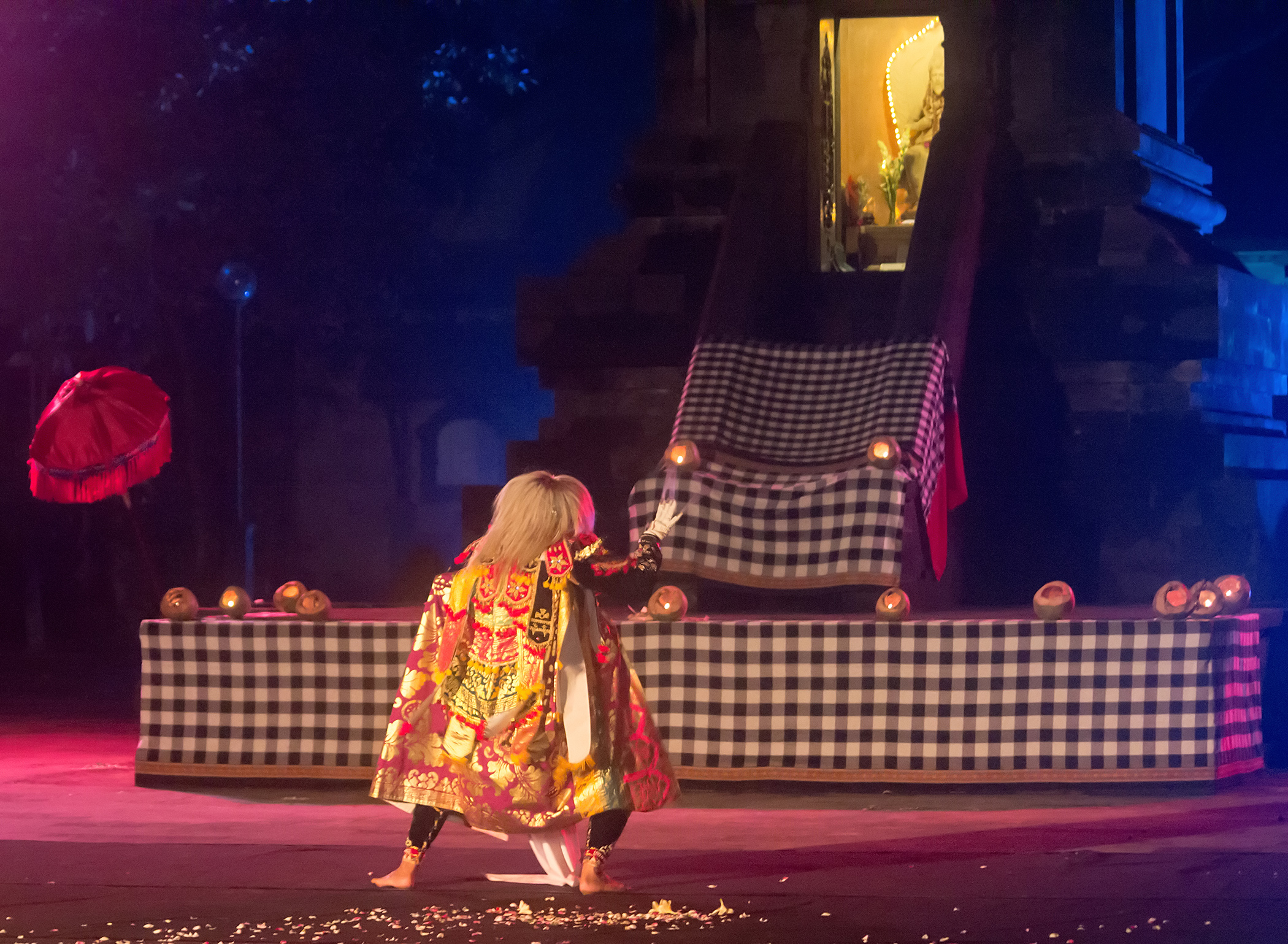
Balinese dance in front of the temple

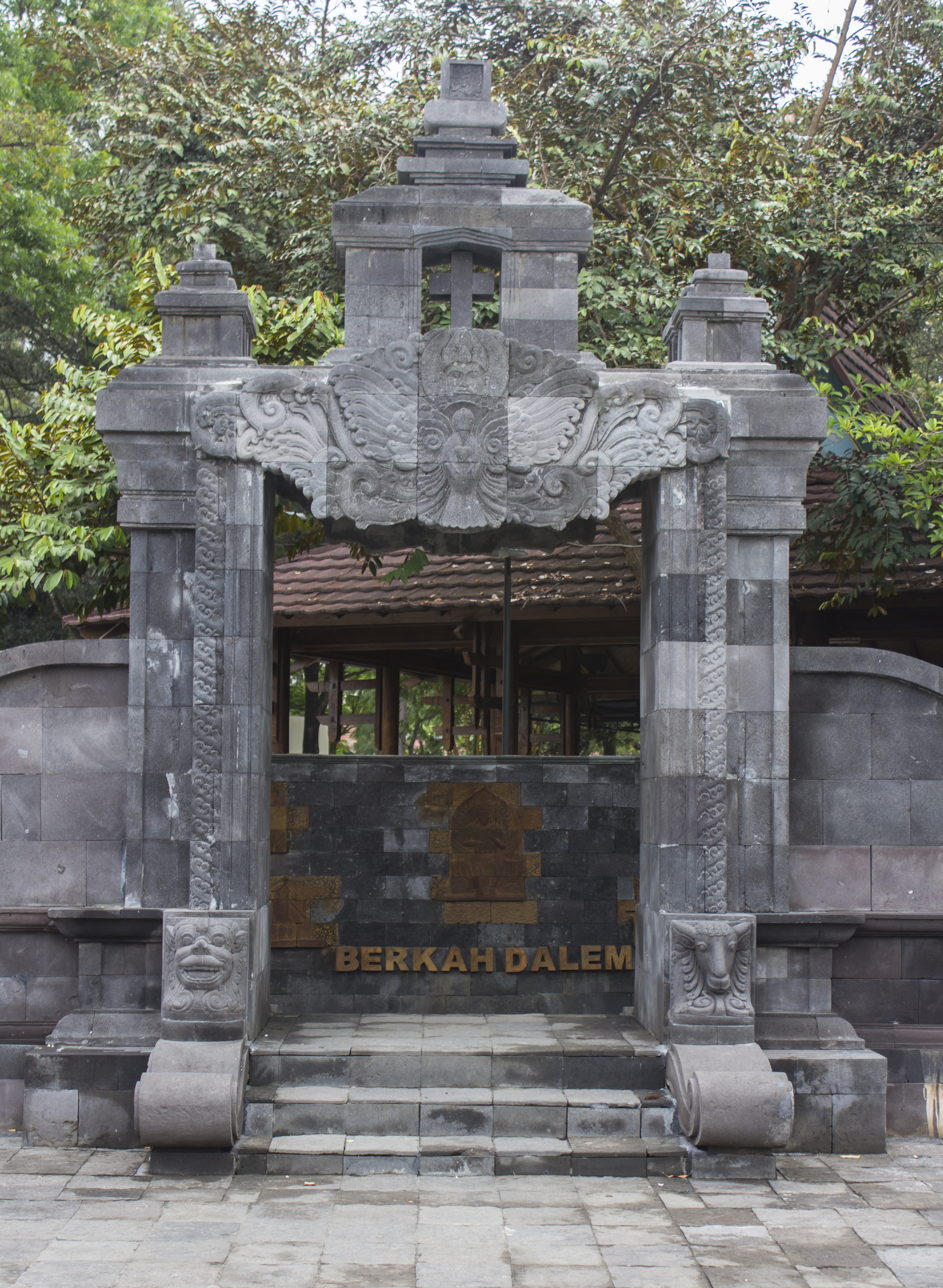
Gateway to the church

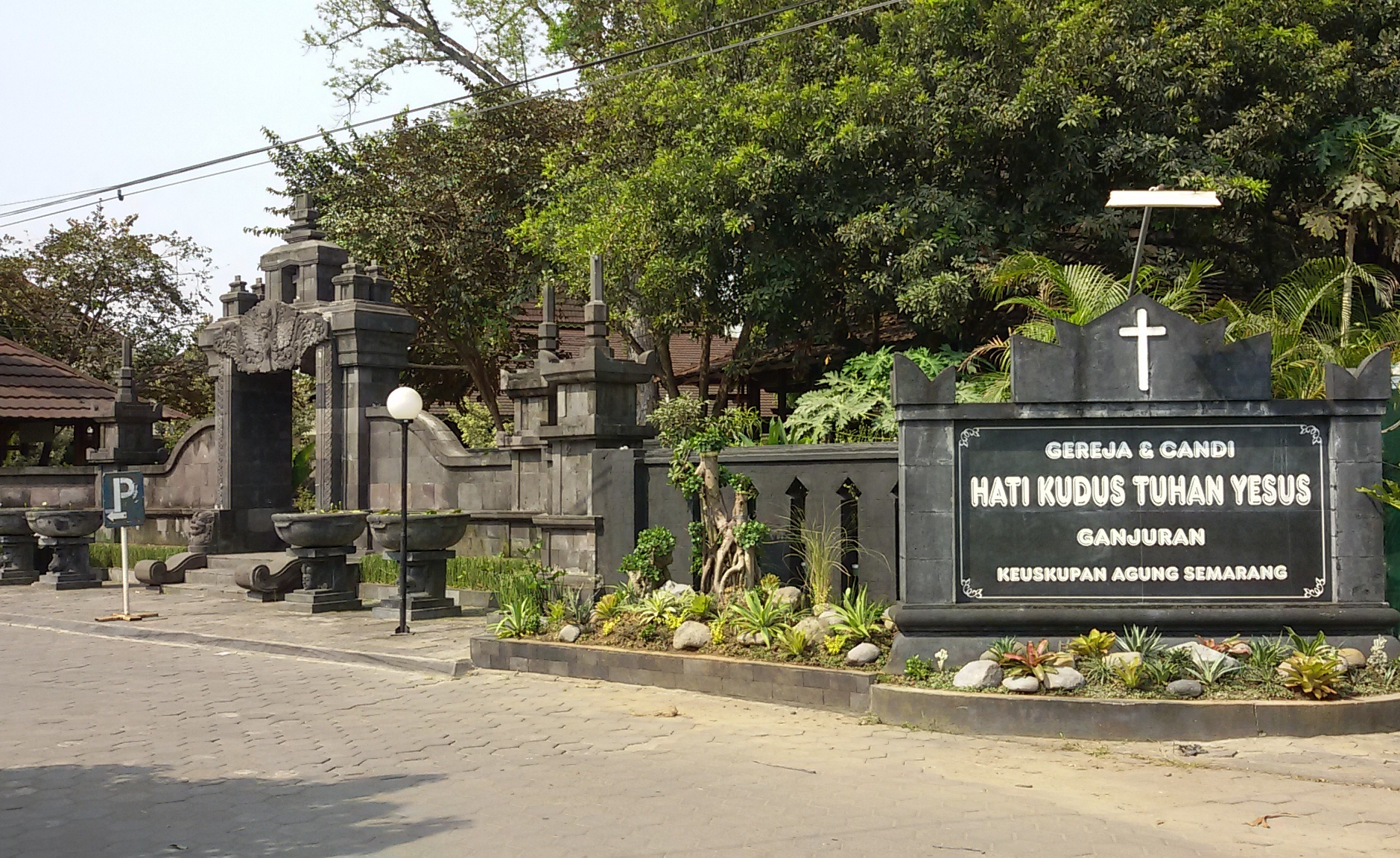
Front gate of the church

== See also ==
- Catholicism in Indonesia
- List of church buildings in Indonesia
- Christianity in Indonesia

== Sources ==
- Aritonang, Jan S.; Steenbrink, Karel A., eds. (2008). A History of Christianity in Indonesia. Studies in Christian Mission. Vol. 35. Leiden: Brill. ISBN 978-90-04-17026-1.
- Ricklefs, Merle Calvin (2007). Polarising Javanese Society: Islamic and Other Visions, C. 1830-1930. Leiden: KITLV Press. ISBN 978-9971-69-346-6.
- Subanar, G. Budi (2003). Soegija, Si Anak Bethleham van Java [Soegija, the Son of the Javanese Bethlehem] (in Indonesian). Yogyakarta: Kanisius. ISBN 978-979-21-0727-2.
- Susanto, Slamet (7 April 2009). "Easter celebration Javanese style in Ganjuran". The Jakarta Post. Archived from the original on 30 July 2009.
- Susanto, Slamet (30 March 2012). "Spreading the spirit of sharing". The Jakarta Post. Archived from the original on 3 April 2012.
- Utomo, Gregorius (2011). The Church of the Sacred Heart of Jesus at Ganjuran. Yogyakarta: Unggul Jaya. ISBN 978-979-16933-1-8.
