= Sultan Agung of Mataram =

Sultan of Mataram (r. 1613–1645)

Anyakrakusuma
- Sultan Agung; Sultan Abdullah Muhammad Maulana Matarani al-Jawi
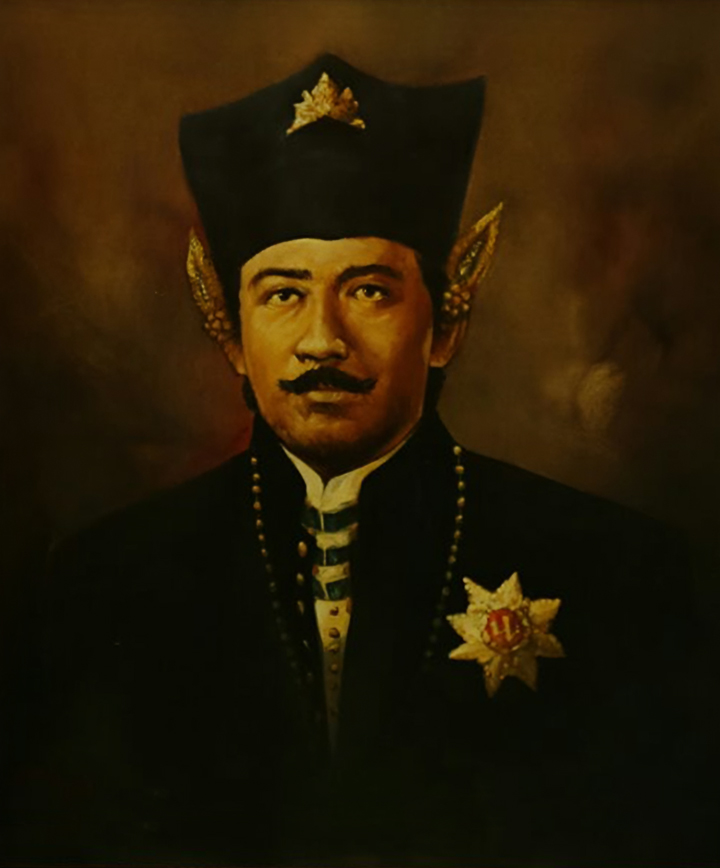
- 2008 portrait

3rd Sultan of Mataram
- Reign: 1613–1645
- Predecessor: Anyakrawati
- Successor: Amangkurat I
- Born: Raden Mas Jatmika; 1593; Kutagede, Mataram Sultanate
- Died: 1645 (aged 51–52); Karta, Mataram Sultanate
- Burial: Astana Kasultan Agungan
- Queen consort: Ratu Kulon/West Queen (first); Ratu Wetan/East Queen (second)
Regnal name
- Sampeyan Dalem Ingkang Sinuhun Kangjeng Sultan Agung Adi Prabu Anyakrakusuma Senapati ing Ngalaga Abdurrahman Sayyidin Panatagama Khalifatullah Tanah Jawi
Posthumous name
- Sultan Abdullah Muhammad Maulana Matarani al-Jawi
- Dynasty: Mataram
- Father: Anyakrawati
- Mother: Dyah Banawati
- Religion: Islam
- National Hero of Indonesia; S.K. President No. 106 / TK / 1975 dated November 3, 1975.

Sultan Agung Adi Prabu Anyakrakusuma (Javanese: ꦱꦸꦭ꧀ꦠꦤ꧀ꦲꦒꦸꦁꦲꦢꦶꦥꦿꦧꦸꦲꦚꦏꦿꦏꦸꦱꦸꦩ), commonly known as Sultan Agung, was the third Sultan of Mataram in Central Java ruling from 1613 to 1645. He was a skilled soldier who conquered neighbouring states and expanded and consolidated his kingdom to its greatest territorial and military power.

Sultan Agung or Susuhunan Agung (literally, "Great Sultan" or "Majestic Sultan") is subject to a substantial amount of literature due to his legacy as a Javanese ruler, a fighter against the incursions of the Dutch East India Company, a conqueror, and his existence within a cultural framework where myth and magic are intertwined with verifiable historical events and personages. The Dutch literature wrote his name as Agoeng de Grote (literally, "Agung the Great").

For his service as a fighter and cultural observer, Sultan Agung was declared as National Hero of Indonesia on November 3, 1975.

== Biography ==
=== Early reign ===
Rangsang ascended to the throne when he was 20 years old, succeeding his half-brother, Duke Martapura, who became Sultan of Mataram for only one day. Rangsang was technically the fourth Sultan of Mataram, but he is commonly considered the third sultan because the coronation of his intellectually disabled half-brother was just to fulfill his father's promise to his wife, Queen Tulungayu, Martapura's mother.

During the second year of Sultan Agung's reign, Patih Mandaraka died of old age, and his position as patih (viceregent) was occupied by Tumenggung Singaranu.

The capital of Mataram during his coronation was still located in Kotagede. In 1614, the new Karta Palace was built in Karta, approximately 5 km in southwest of Kotagede, which began to be occupied four years later.

=== Territorial conquests ===
The maximum extent of Mataram Sultanate during the reign of Sultan Agung Anyakrakusuma (1613-1645)

Sultan Agung became the ruler of Mataram in 1613. In the following year he attacked Surabaya, as well as Malang which lies south of Surabaya, and the eastern end of Java island, but failed to conquer them both. He was however able to extract a significant indemnity and used this in 1615, to conquer Wirasaba (present-day Mojoagung, near Mojokerto), an operation which he led.

In 1616, Surabaya attempted to attack Mataram in retaliation, but lacking allies the Surabaya army was crushed by Sultan Agung's forces in Siwalan, Panjang (near Surakarta). The coastal city of Lasem, near Rembang, was conquered later in 1616, and Pasuruan, southeast of Surabaya, was taken in 1617. Tuban, one of the oldest and biggest cities on the coast of Java, was taken in 1619.

Surabaya had been Mataram's most formidable adversary thus far. Agung's grandfather, Senopati (Senapati), had not felt strong enough to attack this powerful city, and his father, Panembahan Seda Krapyak, attacked it to no avail. Sultan Agung weakened Surabaya by capturing Sukadana, Surabaya's ally in southwest Kalimantan, in 1622, and also captured the island of Madura, another ally of Surabaya, in 1624 after a fierce battle. After five years of war, Agung finally conquered Surabaya in a siege in 1625. With Surabaya brought into the empire, the Mataram kingdom encompassed all of central and eastern Java (plus Madura), except for the west end of Java and its mountainous south. In the west, Banten and the Dutch settlement in Batavia remained outside Agung's control.

The economy of Mataram was centered on agriculture, thus Sultan Agung who was openly contemptuous of trade, saw no need to maintain significant naval forces. This was later to prove costly when in 1629 he attacked and attempted to drive the Dutch out of their base at the coastal city of Jakarta. Though he possessed larger and superior land-based forces, the Dutch had decisive advantages in naval power and were able to withstand the Siege of Batavia.

After the failure of the siege, Agung turned against the Balinese, then controlling Balambangan in East Java, in a "holy war" against infidels. His campaign was successful in Java, but he was unable to extend his power to the island of Bali itself. Bali thus retained its identity as a Hindu state amid the predominantly Muslim states of the archipelago.

=== Rebellions ===
By 1625, Mataram was the undisputed ruler of most of Java. However, its military strength did not deter Mataram's vassals from rebellion, due to his inability to conquer Batavia. Pajang rebelled in 1617, and Pati rebelled in 1627. Following the capture of Surabaya in 1625, expansion halted as the empire was beset by rebellions.

In 1630, Mataram crushed a rebellion in Tembayat (southeast of Klaten). However, in 1631–1636, Mataram had to suppress the rebellion of Sumedang and Ukur in West Java. Agung's attempt to capture Batavia in 1628–1629 and his attempts to drive the Dutch from Java failed.

Rebellions continued, the next one was the Giri Kedaton rebellion, whose people were unwilling to submit to Mataram. As Mataram's troops still respected Giri Kedaton's soldiers which was considered the descendant of Sunan Giri, a member of the Walisanga, Sultan Agung assigned Pangeran Pekik, a descendant of Sunan Ampel (Sunan Giri's father-in-law), to suppress the rebellion. Pangeran Pekik himself had been married to Queen Pandansari, Sultan Agung's sister, in 1633. The Giri Kedaton rebellion would be completely suppressed by them three years later.

=== Death ===
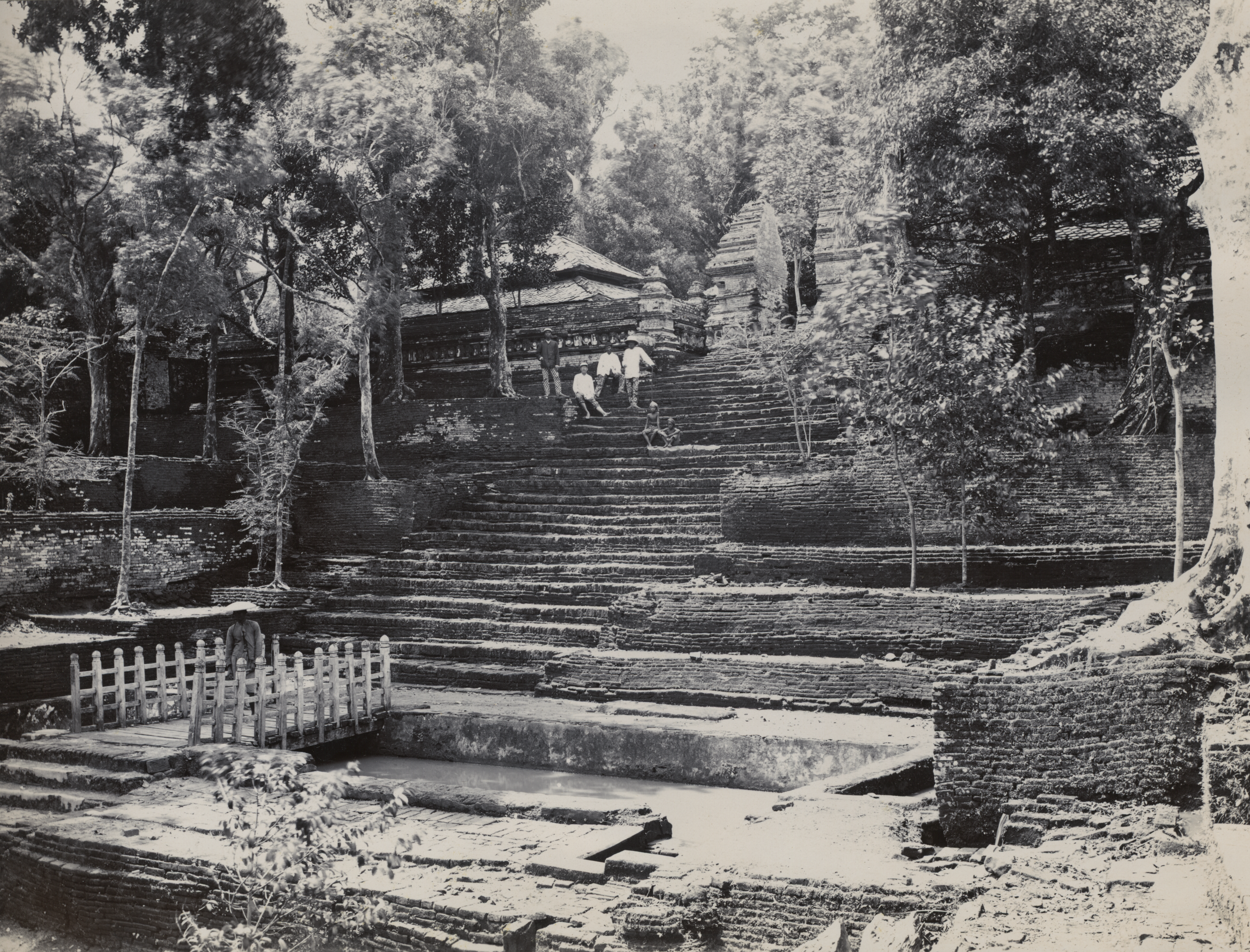
Burial place of Sultan Agung of Mataram in Imogiri, Yogyakarta (circa 1915)

In 1632 Sultan Agung began building Imogiri, his burial place, about 15 kilometers south of Yogyakarta. Imogiri remains the resting place of most of the royalty of Yogyakarta and Surakarta to this day. In Agung's complex, Sultan Agung, Queen Batang, and their sons are also buried. Agung died in the spring of 1645, leaving behind an empire that covered most of Java and stretched to its neighboring islands.

In accordance with his will, Sultan Agung was succeeded by his son, RM. Sayidin, styled Amangkurat I.

== Administration ==
Sultan Agung's major legacy lies however in the administrative reforms he undertook in the conquered territories. The ever-increasing large territorial extent of these territories led him to create an innovative and rational administrative structure.

Apart from his conquests, the sultan also sought to rationalize and improve the internal government of his kingdom. He reformed the tax code and brought the courts and judicial system more in line with Quranic precepts. He commissioned the building of the Karta Palace in 1614, the Royal Graveyard of Imogiri, as well as other social and civic structures within the kingdom.

He created "provinces" by appointing people as adipati (equivalent to Duke) at the head of territories called kadipaten (Duchy), particularly those territories in the western part of Java, where Mataram was facing Banten and Batavia, two places that resisted his wars of conquest. A kabupaten like Karawang, for instance, was created when Sultan Agung appointed Prince Kertabumi as its first adipati in 1636.

=== Remnants of administrative structures during the colonial period ===
When the Dutch East India Company (VOC) took control of Mataram territories, it kept the kadipaten structure. Under the colonial administration of the VOC, adipati, now called bupati, were called regenten, and kadipaten, now kabupaten, regentschappen. The title of a bupati consisted generally of a formal name, for instance, "Sastradiningrat" in the case of Karawang, preceded by "Raden Aria Adipati", hence "Raden Aria Adipati Sastradiningrat" (shortened into R. A. A. Sastradiningrat). The word adipati survived in the colonial system.

The Dutch had grouped kabupaten into regions under a resident, called residenties. The Indonesian government kept the kabupaten but disbanded the residenties in the 1950s, resulting in kabupaten being administrative subdivisions directly under a province. The laws on regional autonomy promulgated in 1999 give a high degree of autonomy to the kabupaten, not to the provinces.

== Culture ==
In the environment of Mataram Palace, Sultan Agung established a standard language called Bagongan obliged to be used by Mataram noblemen and officials to eradicate imbalance between them. The language was created to form a unity across royal court officials. The Sundanese language had been changed since Mataram's rule in West Java, marked by the creation of a refined language only previously known in Central Java.

Sultan Agung is also attributed with the founding of the unique Javanese calendar – this established a uniquely indigenous calendar that is still in use. Besides that, Sultan Agung had written a mystical manuscript, entitled Sastra Gending.

The development of the sacred dance bedhaya and important developments in gamelan and wayang are attributed to the court of Sultan Agung. However, there is almost no historical evidence for the claims of high artistic achievement, and there is little information at all about the arts in the court. Some written evidence comes from a handful of mentions in Dutch accounts, which can be difficult to interpret.

== Legacy ==
Sultan Agung is revered in contemporary Java for his unification of Java, modernizing reforms, and his wars with the colonial Dutch. In 1975, he was nominated and confirmed as a National Hero of Indonesia (Pahlawan Nasional Indonesia). His existence within a cultural framework, where myth and magic are intertwined and the scarcity of verifiable records of his early life, have elevated him to heroic and near-mythical status.

In the syncretic religious culture of Java, with its mixture of Hinduism, Buddhism, and Islam, pilgrimage to his grave is considered auspicious, and many make considerable effort to go to Imogiri at appropriate times and days in the Javanese and Islamic calendars.

His influence and imagination in the popular mind remain strong to the present day, exemplified by the making of the 2018 Indonesian film Sultan Agung Mataram 1628.

== Family ==
His original name was Raden Mas Jatmika, also popularly known as Raden Mas Rangsang. He was the son of Anyakrawati and Ratu Mas Adi Dyah Banawati. His father was Mataram's second monarch, and his mother was the daughter of Prince Benawa, the last Sultan of Pajang.

Another account states that Sultan Agung was the son of Prince Purbaya, brother of Anyakrawati, and that Prince Purbaya exchanged the baby born by his wife with one born by Dyah Banawati; this is a minority and unverified opinion.

Like other Mataram monarchs, Sultan Agung had two main queen consorts:

1. Ratu Kulon, born as Ratu Mas Tinumpak, daughter of Panembahan Ratu, the Sultan of Cirebon, who gave birth to RM. Syahwawrat alias Prince Alit.
2. Ratu Wetan, daughter of the Duke of Batang, and granddaugther of Ki Juru Martani, who gave birth to RM. Sayidin (later Amangkurat I).

From his consorts, Sultan Agung had children:

- Queen consort of the West (Ratu Kulon)
  - Raden Mas Sahwawrat, titled Pangeran Tumenggung Pajang, later Panembahan Purbaya III
  - Raden Mas Alit, titled Pangeran Arya Mataram, later Pangeran Danupaya
- Queen consort of the East (Ratu Wetan)
  - Raden Mas Sayidin, titled Pangeran Arya Mataram, later Amangkurat I
- Concubine, Mas Ayu Wangèn of Bayat
  - Raden Mas Kasim, titled Pangeran Demang Tanpanangkil
  - Raden Ajeng Jenap, styled Raden Ayu Winongan
- Concubine, Mas Ayu Sekar Rini of Trate
  - Raden Mas Ina, titled Pangeran Rangga of Kajiwan
- Concubine, Mas Ayu Sulanjari of Gêtasaji
  - Raden Mas Rêrangin
- Concubine, Mas Ayu Sulanjari of Kanigara
  - Raden Mas Silisir
  - Raden Ajeng Wêgang
- Concubine, Raden Ayu Kadipaten
  - Raden Mas Mustapa, titled Pangeran Ngabèhi Loring Pasar
- Concubine, Rara Pilih
  - Raden Mas Kaséliran
- Concubine, Bok Rara Sariyah, elevated to Mas Ayu Salyarini
  - Raden Ajeng Dilah, styled Raden Ayu Wiramantri

== Titles ==
In his early reign, Rangsang's title was Susuhunan Anyakrakusuma or Prabu Pandita Anyakrakusuma. After conquering Madura in 1624, he changed his title to Susuhunan Agung Anyakrakusuma, abbreviated as Sunan Agung Anyakrakusuma.

In 1640s, he used the title Sultan Agung Senapati ing Alaga Abdurrahman. In 1641, Sunan Agung had an Arabic title, Sultan Abdullah Muhammad Maulana of Mataram, bestowed by imams in Mecca.

For the sake of convenience, the name used in this article is the most common and popular: Sultan Agung.

Preceded by Anyokrowati	Sultan of Mataram; 1613–1645	Succeeded by Amangkurat I
