= Trunajaya's Pasisir offensive =

Part of a 17-century rebellion in Java

Trunajaya's North Coast offensive
- Part of the Trunajaya rebellion
Date	October 1676 – January 1677
Location	Pasisir (Northern coast of Java), between Surabaya and Karawang (in today's Indonesia)
Result	Rebel victory
Territorial changes	Nearly all coastal towns from Surabaya to Karawang were captured by Trunajaya (Note: except Jepara)

Belligerents
Mataram Sultanate; Dutch East India Company (VOC)	Forces of Trunajaya; Banten Sultanate

Commanders and leaders
Wangsadipa; Ngabehi Martadipa (surrendered); Singaperbangsa †	Trunajaya; Kraeng of Galesong; Rd. Senapati

Strength
Unknown	9,000

After his victory at the Battle of Gegodog in October 1676 in northeast Java, the Madurese rebel leader Trunajaya proceeded westwards to conquer Mataram Sultanate's remaining towns in Pasisir, the north coastal region of Java.

== Background ==
The Trunajaya rebellion began in 1674 as Trunajaya's forces conducted raids against the cities under Mataram control. In 1676, a rebel army of 9,000 invaded East Java from their base in Madura, and captured Surabaya, the principal city of East Java, shortly after. Mataram King Amangkurat I sent a large army to take him on under the Crown Prince (later Amangkurat II), but this army was decisively defeated on 13 September at the Battle of Gegodog in northeast Java. After Gegodog, the Javanese north coast was open to Trunajaya's forces.

== Offensive ==
The rebel forces quickly proceeded westwards after the victory. The Javanese northern coastal region, Pasisir, contained many trading towns such as Surabaya, Tuban, Juwana, Pati, Jepara, Semarang and Kendal.

In 1676, the rebels met Mataram forces in battle at Tuban. The rebels defeated the Mataram forces and created an opportunity to capture Surabaya. The rebels succeeded in defeating the Mataram forces there and captured Surabaya. After the Mataram forces withdrew from East Java, the rebels launched an offensive on the coastal city in Java. In Gresik, the rebels initiated a battle against the Dutch and succeeded in expelling them. Later the rebels burned down the city.

After the battles in Gresik, rebels fought battles against the Dutch in Jepara and succeeded in defeating the Dutch and burned the city. Soon after, the Dutch and Mataram forces expelled the rebels. The rebels then captured Cirebon from Dutch forces, and they also burned and looted the city.

Trunajaya's forces met with significant resistance in Jepara. In response to the rebellion, Amangkurat had installed a military man, Angabei Wangsadipa, as governor in Jepara overseeing the entire northern coast. Subsequently, the town's defenses had been reinforced and additional cannons had been placed. Jepara's defender also had help from a Dutch East India Company (VOC) force of 200 men, who were reinforced by sea. They arrived on 20 November 1676 and began besieging the city. The joint Mataram-VOC defense, as well as the quarrel between the Madurese and Makassarese groups of attackers, caused the attack to ultimately fail.

After failing to capture Jepara, Trunajaya's captains attacked other towns along the coast. The attacks were made easy by many towns having their fortifications dismantled due to their conquest with Mataram's Sultan Agung about five decades before. Trading towns were laid in ruin and ships were taken over to carry out further attacks. According to H. J. de Graaf, Mataram troops conducted "courageous" defenses of Kudus and Demak, but ultimately fell. On 5 January 1677, Trunajaya reached as far west as Cirebon and captured the town, after other coastal towns (except Jepara) had been captured. VOC forces in their Batavia headquarters prevented a further westward advance.
