= Fall of Plered =

1677 capture of the Mataram Sultanate capital by Trunajaya loyalists

- Part of Trunajaya rebellion
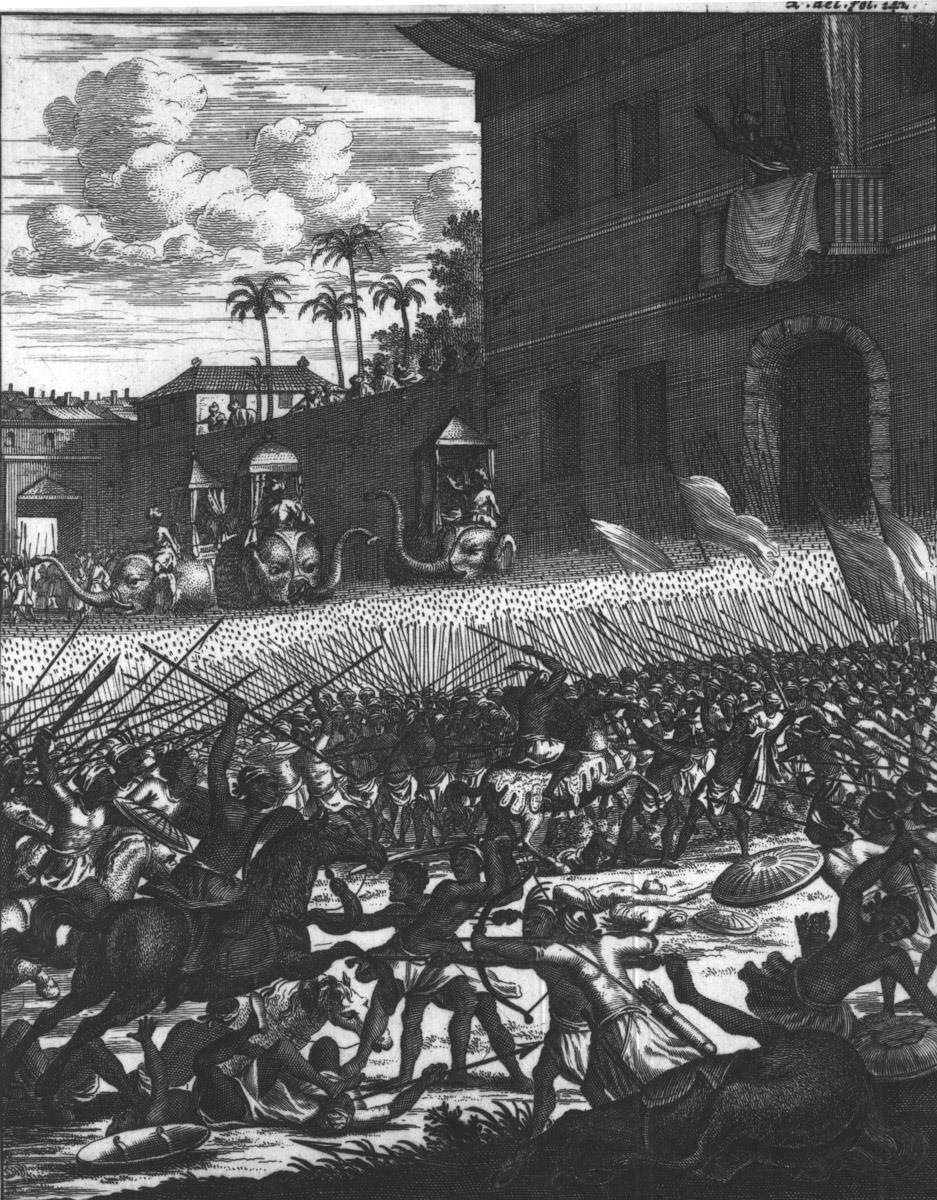
- Battle at Mataram in 1676
Date	Late June 1677
Location	Plered, Mataram Sultanate (in today's Bantul Regency, Yogyakarta, Indonesia)
Result	Rebel victory

Belligerents
Mataram Sultanate	Forces of Trunajaya

Commanders and leaders
Amangkurat I † (killed during retreat); Pangeran Adipati Anom (later Amangkurat II); Pangeran Puger (Pakubuwana I); Pangeran Martasana; Pangeran Singasari	Raden Kajoran; Pangeran Purbaya; Tumenggung Mangkuyuda

The Fall of Plered (also spelled Pleret) was the capture of the capital of the Mataram Sultanate by the rebel forces loyal to Trunajaya in late June 1677. The attack on Plered followed a series of rebel victories, notably in the Battle of Gegodog and the fall of most of Mataram's northern coast. The aged and sick King Amangkurat I and his sons offered an ineffective defense, and the rebels overran the capital on or around 28 June. The capital was plundered and its wealth taken to the rebel capital in Kediri. The loss of the capital led to the collapse of the Mataram government and the flight of the royal family. The king fled with his son the crown prince and a small retinue to Tegal and died there, passing the kingship to the crown prince, now titled Amangkurat II, without any army or treasury.

== Background ==
=== Progress of the Trunajaya rebellion ===
The Trunajaya rebellion began in 1674 as raids by the rebel forces against the cities of the Mataram Sultanate. In 1676, a rebel army of 9,000 invaded Java from their base in Madura. They routed a much larger royal army in the Battle of Gegodog in northeast Java (October 1676), took most of Java's north coast and campaigned successfully in the interior central and east Java. In the same year, the rebels arrived at Taji, the eastern entrance to the capital district, and was joined by the men of Raden Kajoran, Trunajaya's powerful father-in-law. The combined forces was defeated by loyalist forces led by Mataram's royal princes, but Kajoran escaped and joined Trunajaya. Despite the defeat, Kajoran continued to cause trouble for Mataram in districts east of the capital. In early 1677, the Dutch East India Company (VOC) in Batavia decided to ally itself with Mataram. A fleet led by Cornelis Speelman sailed to Trunajaya's capital in Surabaya in April, northeastern coast of Java, and took the city after hard fighting in May. Following the defeat, Trunajaya retreated inland, establishing a new capital in Kediri.

=== The court at Plered ===
Amangkurat I's father and predecessor Sultan Agung built an artificial lake in an area which became known as Plered, east of his court at Karta. In 1647, shortly after taking the throne, Amangkurat built his royal residence near the lake and moved the court there. In contrast to Karta, which was made of wood, the royal compound at Plered was built of brick. Amangkurat continued to expand this complex up to 1666.

== Opposing forces ==
According to Jacob Couper, a VOC envoy to Mataram, in March 1677 the rule of King Amangkurat I was visibly collapsing. The king was ill and his four eldest sons, the crown prince (later Amangkurat II), Pangeran Puger (later Pakubuwana I), Pangeran Martasana and Pangeran Singasari were manoeuvring for power. The royal guards, as well as the guards of the princes were available for defending of the capital, but disunity among the four princes prevented an effective defense.

Rebel forces in this sector consisted of Madurese troops, as well as Javanese forces from East Java and central northern coast. They were led by Raden Kajoran, the head of the important and powerful family in the area (Kajoran is in today's Magelang Regency). The Kajoran family was interrelated by marriage to the royal family, but he was alarmed at the king's brutality which had resulted in the death of many noblemen at court. Raden Kajoran was also the father-in-law of Trunajaya. The forces of Pangeran Purbaya, the king's cousin, also joined the rebels. The crown prince later identified the forces who overran Mataram to be from Madiun, Pati, Kudus and Grobogan and the men of Kajoran and Purbaya.

== Capture of Plered ==
Kajoran renewed military operations in the capital district in April 1677. The accounts of the military operations are unclear, but in June royal forces, under command of King Amangkurat I's four eldest sons (the crown prince as well as Pangeran Puger, Pangeran Martasana and Pangeran Singasari) were defeated in battle after heavy fighting. The king himself was aged and grievously ill and unable to lead his troops. Superior rebel operations, and the lack of unity among the princes contributed to the rebel victory. In addition, the king's cousin Pangeran Purbaya, defected to the rebel side along with his followers, and the loyal princes were unable to rally their people to fight.

The capital was now "beyond defending". Conflict arose between the crown prince and his brother Pangeran Puger. The king put Puger in charge of the defense of the capital, awarding him the title Susuhunan Ingalaga ("king on the field of battle").

Amid anarchy and panic, the king fled the court, in the middle of the night, possibly on or around 28 June, with a small retinue. Soon afterwards, rebel forces entered and sacked the court. The demoralized defenders under Puger soon fled. Rebels entered and plundered the compound of the king, and those of the absent princes, accompanied by much fire-raising. The royal treasury of at least 300,000 Spanish reals were taken by rebels. (Note: The exact fate of the treasury was unclear. A man claiming to be an eyewitness said that the whole treasury was taken to Trunajaya's capital at Kediri, while the crown prince later said that 150,000 was taken to Kediri and 200,000 remained in Mataram with Trunajaya's commander Tumenggung Mangkuyuda.)

== Flight and death of Amangkurat I ==
Sources disagree on the details of the royal family's flight. According to the Dutch historian H. J. de Graaf, the king and his sons fled separately. Among his sons, the king encountered Puger and Singasari, who refused to come with him and later the crown prince, who did. According to Javanese accounts, the king instructed Puger, Singasari and Martasana to form a new defence to the west of the capital, while he took the crown prince and a younger son Pangeran Arya Mataram travelling northwest. The king travelled through areas not yet under rebel control: west through Bagelen, then the mountainous region of Banyumas, and then north towards Tegal on the coast. He travelled in a palanquin due to his illness, and was unmolested save for (according to Javanese accounts), an attempted robbery by villagers of Karanganyar who were unaware of his identity.

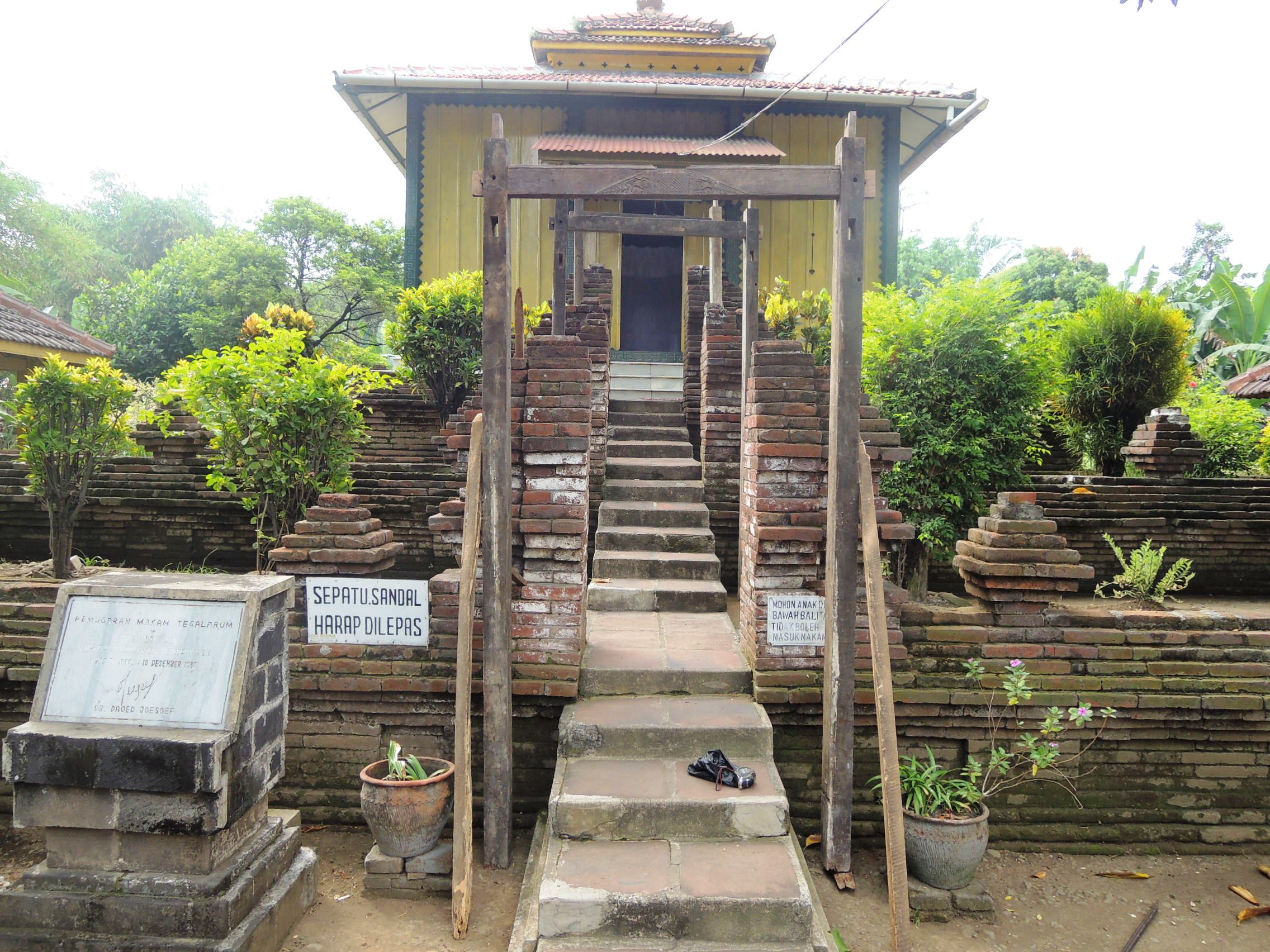
The grave of Amangkurat I in Tegal Arum Complex, Tegal Regency, Central Java. He retreated there after the fall of Plered.

According to de Graaf, he went to Tegal in order to meet with a VOC official on a ship but died on the way. According to the Javanese accounts, the aged and ill king, certain of his imminent death, went to Tegal because he wished to be buried there. Tegal was in his mother's country and he sent his officials ahead to build a grave for him in Tegalwangi, few kilometers south of the coast. As he laid dying, he ceremonially handed over the regalia to the crown prince, and instructed him to recapture the court with the Dutch's help. He then died, and his body was washed, prayed over and taken to the burial site in Tegalwangi. He was buried on 13 July and thirteen VOC soldiers from the ship off Tegal attended the burial. He was given the posthumous name Seda-ing-Tegalwangi ("He who died in Tegalwangi").

== Aftermath ==
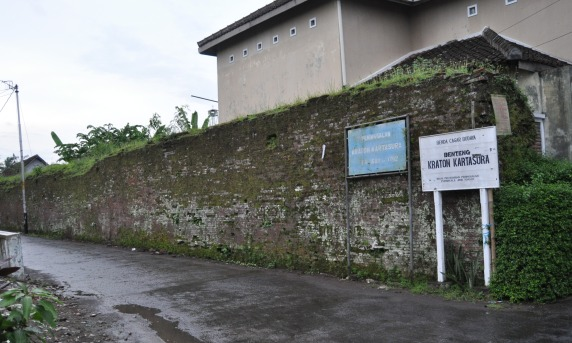
Remains of Kartasura, a new capital built by Amangkurat II after Plered's fall.

After his father's death, the crown prince became King Amangkurat II, but he had no court, no army and no treasury. He was accepted by the Javanese gentry and by VOC officials in Tegal, but could not establish his authority elsewhere in Java. The sultan of Cirebon, a vassal of Mataram since 1660 refused to pay homage. His brother Pangeran Puger occupied the capital after the rebels left, and made a rival claim to the kingdom. Aware of his difficult position, the new king sailed to Jepara to meet with the VOC commander Speelman and renewed the Mataram-VOC alliance. In exchange for VOC assistance, he was obliged to promise a large sum of money and geopolitical concessions. The Trunajaya rebellion would continue until 1680 and Puger's pretension to the throne until 1681. Unable to take Plered from his brother, in 1680 Amangkurat II built a new capital in the district of Pajang, and called it Kartasura.
