= Trunajaya rebellion =

1674–80 failed revolt in Java

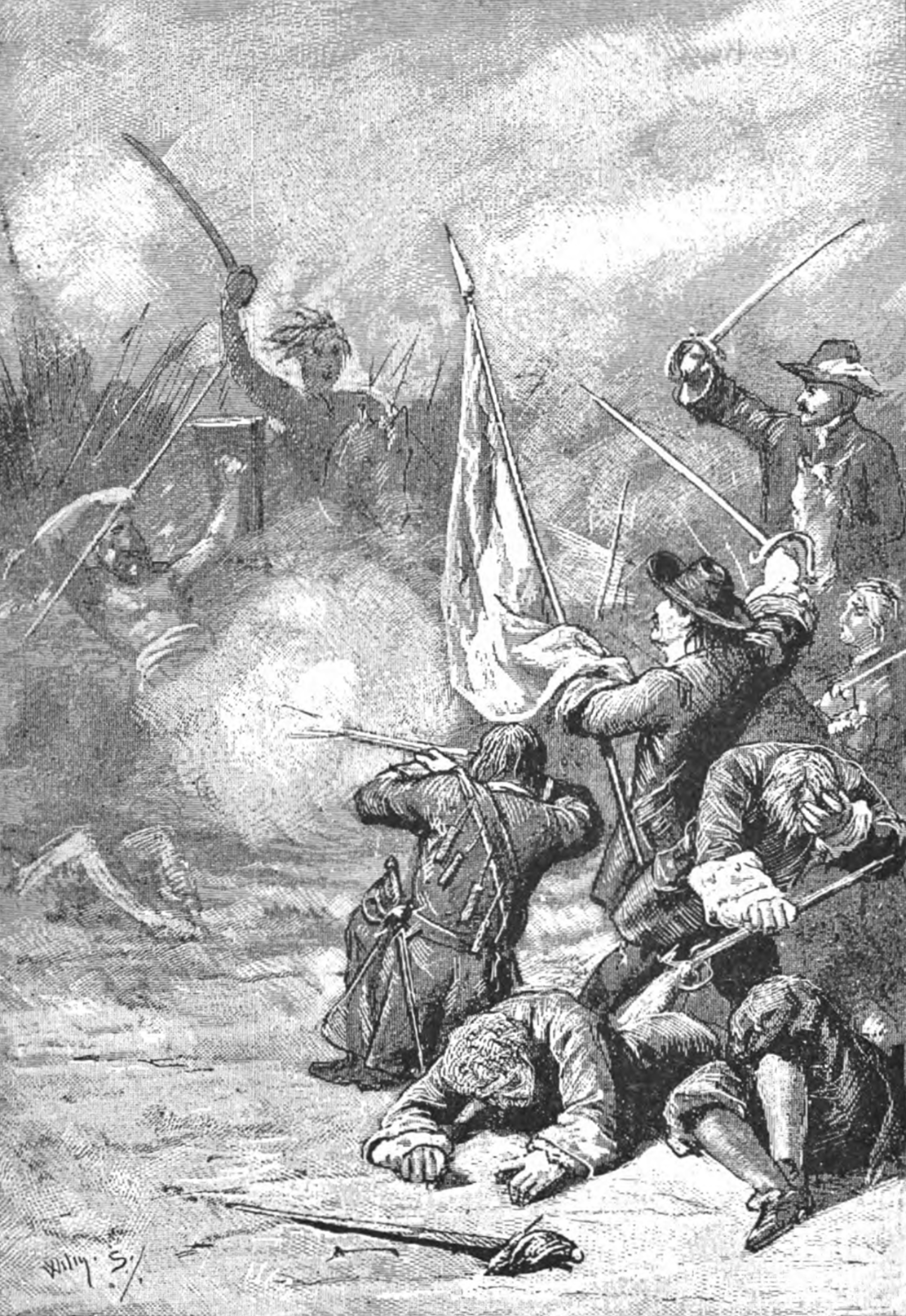
- An 1890 Dutch depiction of fighting between VOC soldiers and Trunajaya's forces during the war
Date	1674–1680 (main campaign); Puger rebellion continued until 1681
Location	Java (in modern-day Indonesia)
Result	VOC–Mataram victory; Javanese Wars of Succession

Belligerents
Mataram Sultanate: Dutch East India Company (VOC); Buginese allies	Trunajaya's rebel forces; Makassarese itinerant fighters; Banten Sultanate (secretly); Rival claimants to Mataram throne (after 1677)

Commanders and leaders
Amangkurat I X Amangkurat II; Cornelis Speelman; Anthonio Hurdt; Jacob Couper; Arung Palakka	Rebel leaders: Trunajaya (surrendered) (executed); Karaeng Galesong; Raden Kajoran (executed); Lord of Giri (executed); Co-belligerent (1677–1681): Pangeran Puger (surrendered)

Strength
Mataram: "Much larger" than 9,000 (1676); 13,000 (late 1678); VOC: 1,500 (1676); 1,750 (1678); Buginese forces: 1,500 (1678); 6,000 (1679); Total: 16,250 (1678)	Trunajaya's forces: 9,000 (1676); 14,500 (1678) (Note: Rebel claim); Puger's forces: 10,000 (Aug 1681)

The Trunajaya Rebellion (also spelled Trunojoyo) or Trunajaya War was a conflict in the 1670s led by the Madurese prince Trunajaya and Makassarese fighters against the Mataram Sultanate and the Dutch East India Company (VOC) in Java (in modern-day Indonesia).

The uprising was initially successful; the rebels gained Gegodog (1676), the majority of Java's north coast (1677), and the capital of Mataram (1677) from the royal army. During the retreat of the royal court, King Amangkurat I died. Amangkurat II, his son and successor, asked the VOC for assistance in exchange for cash payments and territorial concessions. The subsequent engagement of the VOC changed the course of the battle. Trunajaya was driven from Surabaya (1677) by VOC and Mataram forces, who also helped Amangkurat II reclaim lost territory and take control of Trunajaya's new capital at Kediri (1678). However, the uprising persisted until Trunajaya was captured at the end of 1679 and the other rebel leaders were overthrown, killed, or submitted (1679–1680). Amangkurat II personally executed Trunajaya in 1680 while he was a prisoner of the VOC.

After his father died in 1677, Amangkurat II also faced rival claims to the throne. The most serious rival was his brother Pangeran Puger, who took the capital Plered in 1677 and did not surrender until 1681.

== Background ==
Map of Java, illustrating Mataram's expansions just before Amangkurat I took the throne in 1646.

Amangkurat I took the throne of Mataram in 1646, succeeding Sultan Agung, who had expanded Mataram's realm to include most of Central and East Java, as well as a few overseas vassals in southern Sumatra and Borneo. The early years of Amangkurat's reign were marked by executions and massacres against his political enemies. In response to the failed coup attempt of his brother Pangeran Alit, he ordered massacres of Islamic men who he believed were complicit in Alit's rebellion. Alit himself was killed during the failed coup. In 1659 Amangkurat suspected that Pangeran Pekik, his father-in-law and the son of the conquered Duke of Surabaya who lived at the Mataram court after Surabaya's defeat, was leading a conspiracy against his life. He ordered Pekik and his relatives killed. This massacre of East Java's most important princely house created a rift between Amangkurat and his East Javanese subjects and caused a conflict with his son, the crown prince (later Amangkurat II), who was also Pekik's grandson. Over the next few years, Amangkurat carried out several additional killings against members of the nobility who had lost his trust.

Raden Trunajaya (also spelled Trunojoyo) was a descendant of the rulers of Madura, who was forced to live in the Mataram court after Madura's defeat and annexation by Mataram in 1624. After his father was executed by Amangkurat I in 1656, he left the court, moved to Kajoran, and married the daughter of Raden Kajoran, the head of the ruling family there. The Kajoran family was an ancient family of clerics and was related by marriage to the royal family. Raden Kajoran was alarmed at the brutality of Amangkurat I's rule, including executions of noblemen at court. In 1670 Kajoran introduced his son-in-law Trunajaya to the crown prince, who had recently been banished by the king due to a scandal, and the two forged a friendship that included a mutual dislike of Amangkurat. In 1671 Trunajaya returned to Madura, where he used the crown prince's support to defeat the local governor and become the master of Madura.

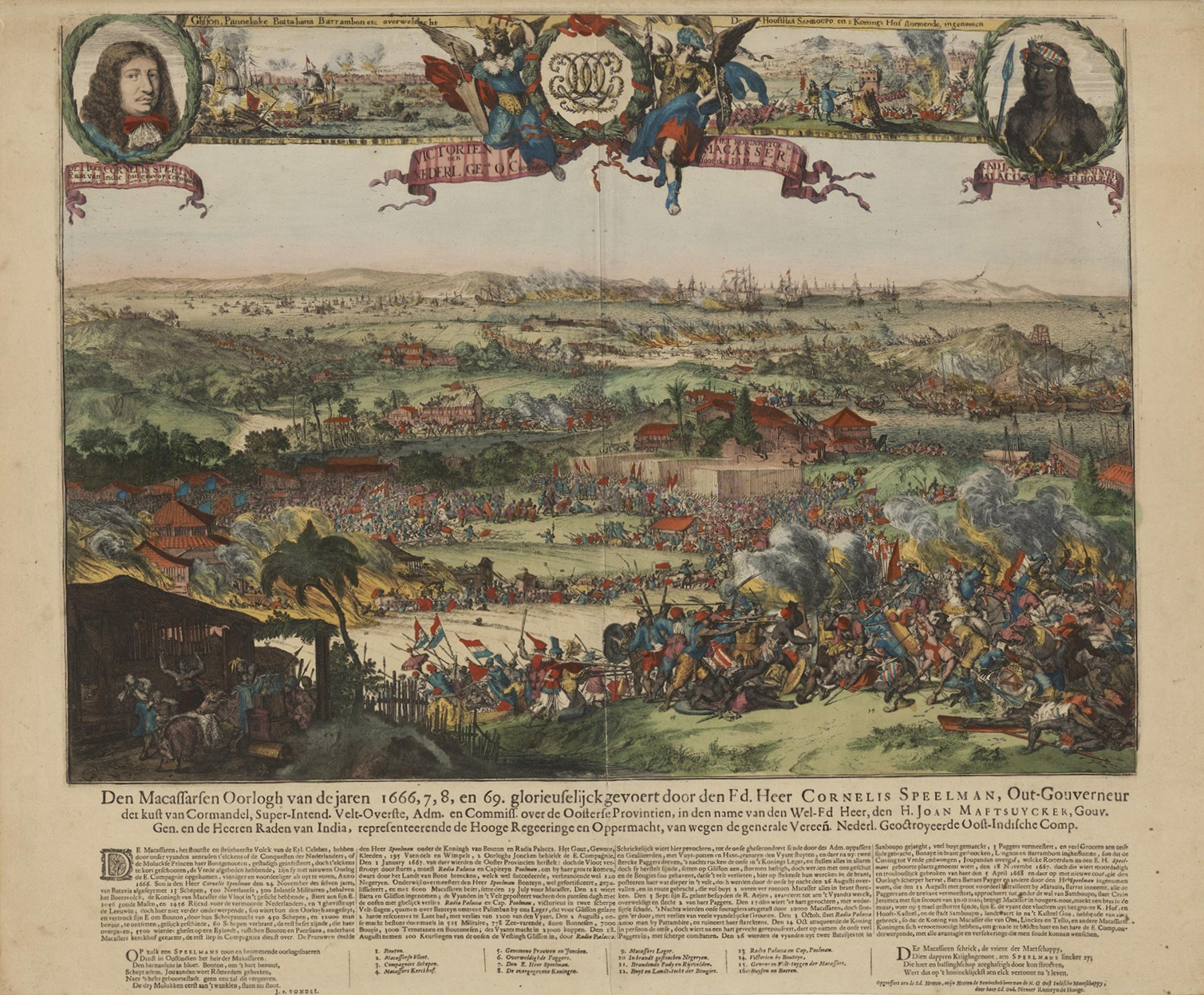
The taking of Makassar by the VOC in 1669 caused emigration of Makassarese fighters to Java, many of which would later join the rebels' side.

Makassar was the principal trading center east of Java. After the 1669 VOC victory over the Gowa Sultanate in the Makassar War, bands of Makassarese soldiers fled Makassar to seek their fortune elsewhere. Initially, they settled in territories of the Banten Sultanate, but in 1674 they were expelled, and turned to piracy, raiding coastal towns in Java and Nusa Tenggara. The Mataram crown prince later allowed them to settle in Demung, a village in the eastern salient of Java. In 1675 an additional band of Makassarese fighters and pirates arrived in Demung led by the Kraeng of Galesong. These Makassarese itinerant fighters would later join the rebellion as Trunajaya's allies.

== Forces involved ==
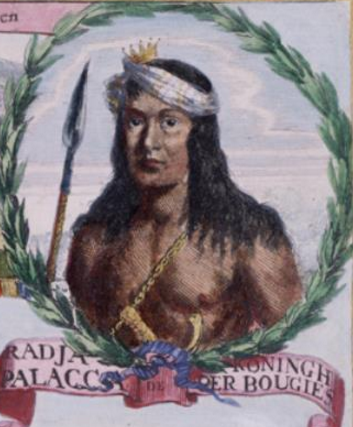
Bugis forces under the prince Arung Palakka (pictured) were among those allied with the VOC to suppress the rebellion.

Lacking a standing army, the bulk of Mataram's forces were drawn from troops raised by the king's vassals, who also provided the arms and supplies. The majority of the men were peasants who were conscripted by the local lords (Javanese: sikep dalem). In addition, the army included a small number of professional soldiers drawn from the palace guards. The army used cannons, small firearms including flintlocks (Javanese: senapan, from Dutch snaphaens) and carbines, cavalry, and fortifications. Historian M. C. Ricklefs said the transfer of European military technology to the Javanese was "virtually immediate", with the Javanese manufacturing gunpowder and firearms by 1620 at the latest. Europeans were hired to train the Javanese troops in weapons handling, military leadership skills, and construction techniques, but despite this training, the conscripted peasants of the Javanese armies often lacked discipline and fled during battle. Mataram's troops numbered "much larger" than the rebel's 9,000 at Gegodog in September 1676, dropped to just "a small retinue" after the fall of the capital in June 1677, and grew to over 13,000 during the march to Trunajaya's capital at Kediri in late 1678.

The VOC had professional soldiers of its own. Each VOC soldier had a sword, small arms, cartridges, carrying pouches and belts, smoke bombs, and grenades. The majority of VOC regulars were Indonesians, with a small number of European soldiers and marines, all under the command of European officers. While in the technological sense, VOC troops were not superior to their indigenous counterparts, they generally had better training, discipline, and equipment than indigenous Indonesian armies. The VOC also maintained superior logistics; its troops marched in formation, supported by supply caravans. This gave them an advantage over Javanese troops, who often lived off the land and frequently faced supply shortages. VOC forces numbered 1,500 in 1676, but they were later augmented by Bugis allies under the leadership of Arung Palakka. The first contingent of 1,500 Bugis arrived in Java in late 1678, and by 1679 there were 6,000 Bugis troops on Java.

Similar to other belligerents, the armies of Trunajaya and his allies also used cannons, cavalry, and fortifications. When the VOC took Surabaya from Trunajaya in May 1677, Trunajaya fled with twenty of his bronze cannons and left behind 69 iron and 34 bronze pieces. Trunajaya's forces included Javanese, Madurese, and Makassarese. When the rebels invaded Java in 1676, they numbered 9,000 and consisted of Trunajaya's followers and the Makassarese fighters. Later, the rebellion was joined by other Javanese and Madurese nobles. Notably, the lord of Giri, one of the most prominent Islamic spiritual lords in Java, joined in early 1676. Trunajaya's father-in-law Raden Kajoran, head of the powerful Kajoran family, joined after Trunajaya's victory at Gegodog in September 1676, and Trunajaya's uncle the prince of Sampang (later Cakraningrat II) joined after the fall of Mataram's capital in June 1677.

== Campaign ==
=== Beginning and initial rebel victories ===
The rebellion began with Makassarese pirates from Demung village raiding trading towns along Java's northern coast. The first raid took place in 1674 in Gresik but was repulsed. In 1675, leader of the Makassarese, the Kraeng of Galesong, allied with Warlord Trunajaya through a marriage agreement, and together started planning further raids. In the same year, the Makassarese–Madurese raiders took and burned principal cities in northeast Java, from Pajarakan to Surabaya and Gresik. Given the failure of Mataram forces, King Amangkurat I appointed a military governor in Jepara, the provincial capital of the northern coast, reinforcing the town and preparing a counterattack on Demung. However, Mataram forces that marched on Demung were defeated, and combined actions by Mataram and VOC ships along the coast controlled by the raiders were not always successful. The Kraeng of Galesong moved to Madura, the domain of his ally Trunajaya. In 1676, Trunajaya gave himself the title Panembahan (Lord of) Maduretna and secured the support of the Sunan (spiritual lord) of Giri, near Gresik. A VOC fleet attack later destroyed the raiders' base in Demung, but they did not take action against Trunajaya in Madura.

=== Battle of Gegodog (1676) ===
In September 1676, a rebel army of 9,000 led by the Kraeng of Galesong crossed over from Madura to Java and later took Surabaya, the principal city of eastern Java. Mataram sent troops commanded by the crown prince Amangkurat (later Amangkurat II) to meet the rebels. A battle took place in Gegodog, east of Tuban, in 1676, resulting in the complete defeat of the much larger Mataram forces. The loyalist army was routed, the king's uncle Pangeran Purbaya was killed, and the crown prince fled to Mataram. The defeat was attributed to the crown prince's hesitation, as he delayed the attack for a prolonged period. In addition, there were rumours that he colluded with the enemy, including his former protégé Trunajaya. In the few months after the victory in Gegodog, the rebels quickly took Javanese northern trading towns from Surabaya westward to Cirebon, including the towns of Kudus and Demak. The towns fell easily, partly due to destroyed fortifications desolated by the conquest of Sultan Agung of Mataram about 50 years earlier. Only Jepara managed to resist capture, due to the combined efforts of the new military governor and VOC forces who reinforced the town just in time. The rebellion spread inland when Raden Kajoran, Trunajaya's powerful father-in-law based to the east of the Mataram capital, joined the rebellion. Kajoran and Trunajaya's forces marched on the capital but were repelled by loyalist forces.

=== Trunajaya North Coast offensive ===
After gaining the victory in the Battle of Gegodog, the rebels proceeded westwards to conquer Mataram Sultanate's remaining towns on the north coast of Java (also known as the Pasisir). By January 1677, the rebels had captured nearly every coastal town between Surabaya and Cirebon, with the exception of Jepara.

=== Battle of Tuban (1676) ===
In 1676, the rebels met with Mataram forces in Tuban, where the battle occurred. Here, the rebels succeeded in defeating the Mataram forces and created an opportunity to capture Surabaya, a coastal city in East Java.

=== Capture of Surabaya (1676) ===
After the Battle of Tuban, the rebels pushed on to Surabaya and fought in battles against Mataram forces. The rebels succeeded in defeating the Mataram forces and captured Surabaya.

=== Battle of Gresik (1676) ===
After the Mataram forces withdrew from East Java, the rebels launched an offensive on coastal cities in Java and in Gresik. The rebels fought a battle against the Dutch, succeeded in expelling them, then burned the city.

=== Battle of Jepara (1676) ===
After the battles in Gresik, the rebels also fought battles against the Dutch in Jepara. They succeeded in defeating the Dutch in Jepara and burned the city. But the victory did not last long, because the Dutch and Mataram forces expelled the rebels and recaptured the city.

=== Battle of Cirebon (1676) ===
The rebels captured Cirebon from Dutch forces, and they also burned and looted the city. This battle showed that the rebels were successful in making it more difficult for the Dutch and Mataram forces to defeat them.

=== VOC intervention and fall of Mataram's capital ===
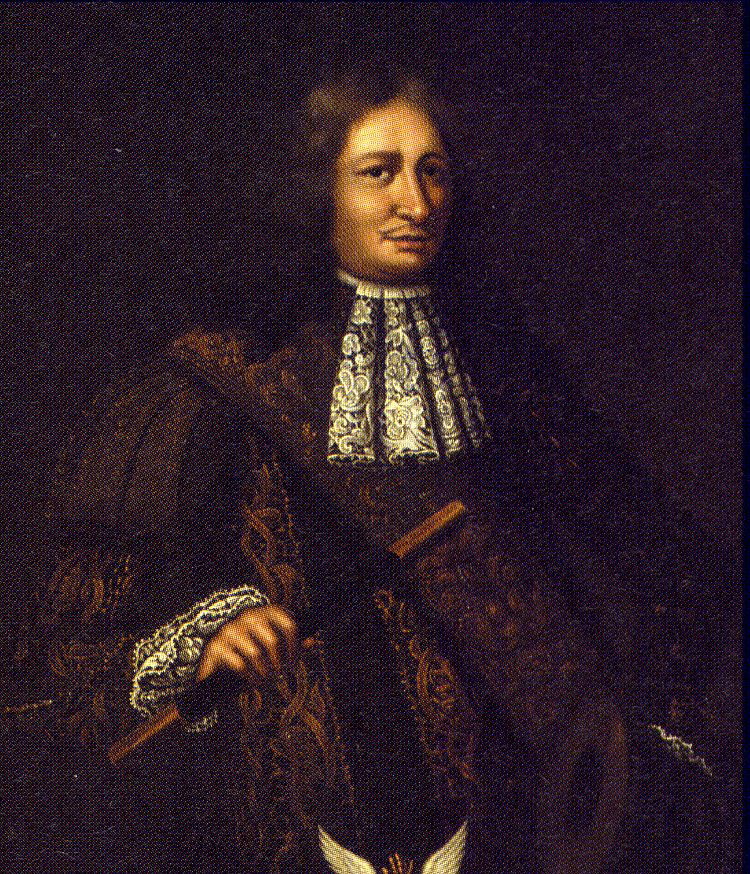
Cornelis Speelman, who led the VOC forces in the war in 1677, and later Governor-General of the VOC.

=== Battle of Surabaya (1677) ===
In response to Mataram's request for intervention, VOC dispatched a large fleet containing Indonesian and European forces, commanded by Admiral Cornelis Speelman. In April 1677 the fleet sailed to Surabaya, where Trunajaya was based. After negotiations failed, Speelman's forces stormed Surabaya and took it after hard fighting. The troops proceeded to clear the rebels from the area surrounding Surabaya. VOC forces also took Madura, Trunajaya's native island, and laid his residence there in ruin. Trunajaya fled Surabaya and established his capital in Kediri.

=== Fall of Pleret (1677) ===
Although the rebels were defeated in Surabaya, rebel forces campaigning in the interior of Central and East Java had more success. The rebel campaign culminated in the fall of the capital Plered in June 1677. The king was ill, and distrust among the royal princes prevented organized resistance. The king fled west with the crown prince and his retinue, allowing the rebels to enter and plunder the capital with little fighting. The rebels then withdrew to Kediri, taking the royal treasury with them.

=== Amangkurat II's accession and alliance with the VOC ===
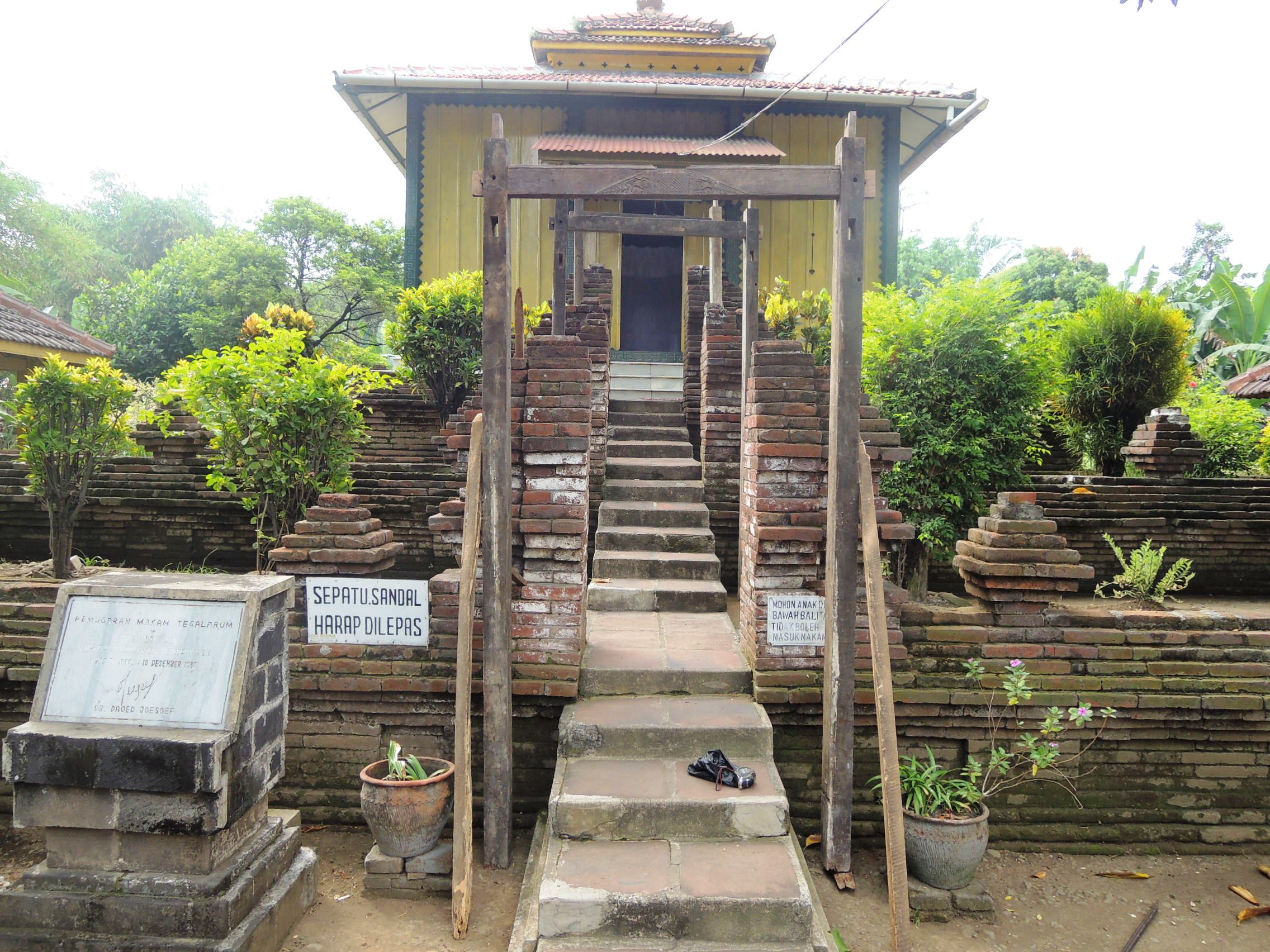
The grave of Amangkurat I in Tegal Arum Complex, Tegal Regency, Central Java.

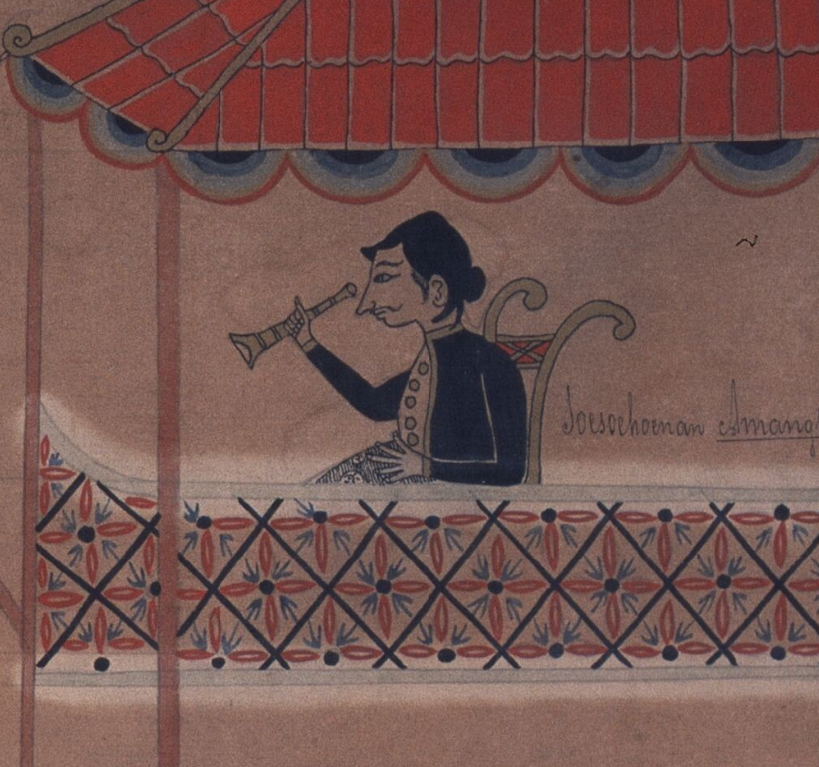
Amangkurat II, the king of Mataram from 1677, in a Javanese traditional painting.

King Amangkurat I died during his retreat in Tegal in July 1677. The crown prince succeeded his father took the title of Amangkurat II, and was accepted by the Javanese gentry in Tegal (his grandmother's hometown) as well as by the VOC. However, he failed to assert his authority in the nearby town of Cirebon, whose ruler decided to declare independence from Mataram with support from the Banten Sultanate. Furthermore, his younger brother Pangeran Puger (later Pakubuwana I) took the now-ruined capital, refused entry to Amangkurat II's loyalists, and declared himself king under the title of Ingalaga Mataram.

Having no army or treasury and unable to assert his authority, Amangkurat decided to ally himself with the VOC. At this point, Admiral Speelman was in Jepara, sailing there from Surabaya after hearing of the fall of the capital. His forces had recovered important coastal towns in Central Java, including Semarang, Demak, Kudus, and Pati. Amangkurat moved to Jepara on VOC ships in September 1677. The king had to agree to sweeping concessions demanded by the VOC in exchange for restoring his monarchy. He promised the VOC the income of all harbour towns on the northern coast. The Priangan highlands and Semarang would be ceded to the VOC. The king also agreed to recognize the jurisdiction of VOC courts over all non-Javanese residing in his domains. Dutch historian H. J. de Graaf commented that by doing this, the VOC, being a corporation, engaged in a "hazardous speculation", which they expected to pay off in the future when their associate would regain his rule over Mataram.

VOC–Mataram forces made slow progress against the rebels. By the beginning of 1678, their control was limited to several towns on the central northern coast. In 1678 Speelman became the Director-General of the VOC, replacing Rijcklof van Goens, who became Governor-General (Speelman would become Governor-General in 1681). His command in Jepara was handed over to Anthonio Hurdt, who arrived in June 1678.

=== Loyalist victories and the death of Trunajaya ===
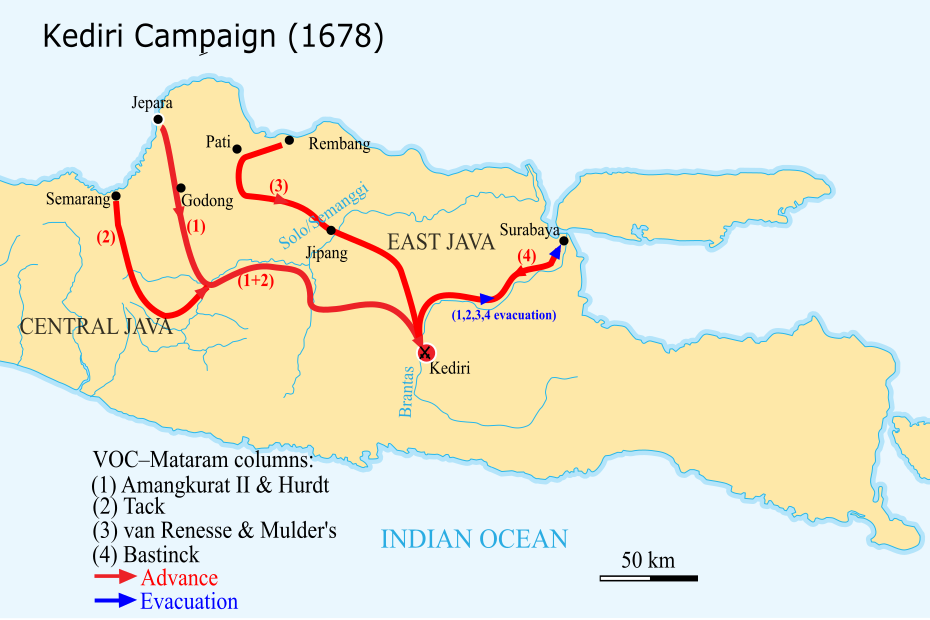
The Mataram–VOC overland campaign to take Trunajaya's capital at Kediri.

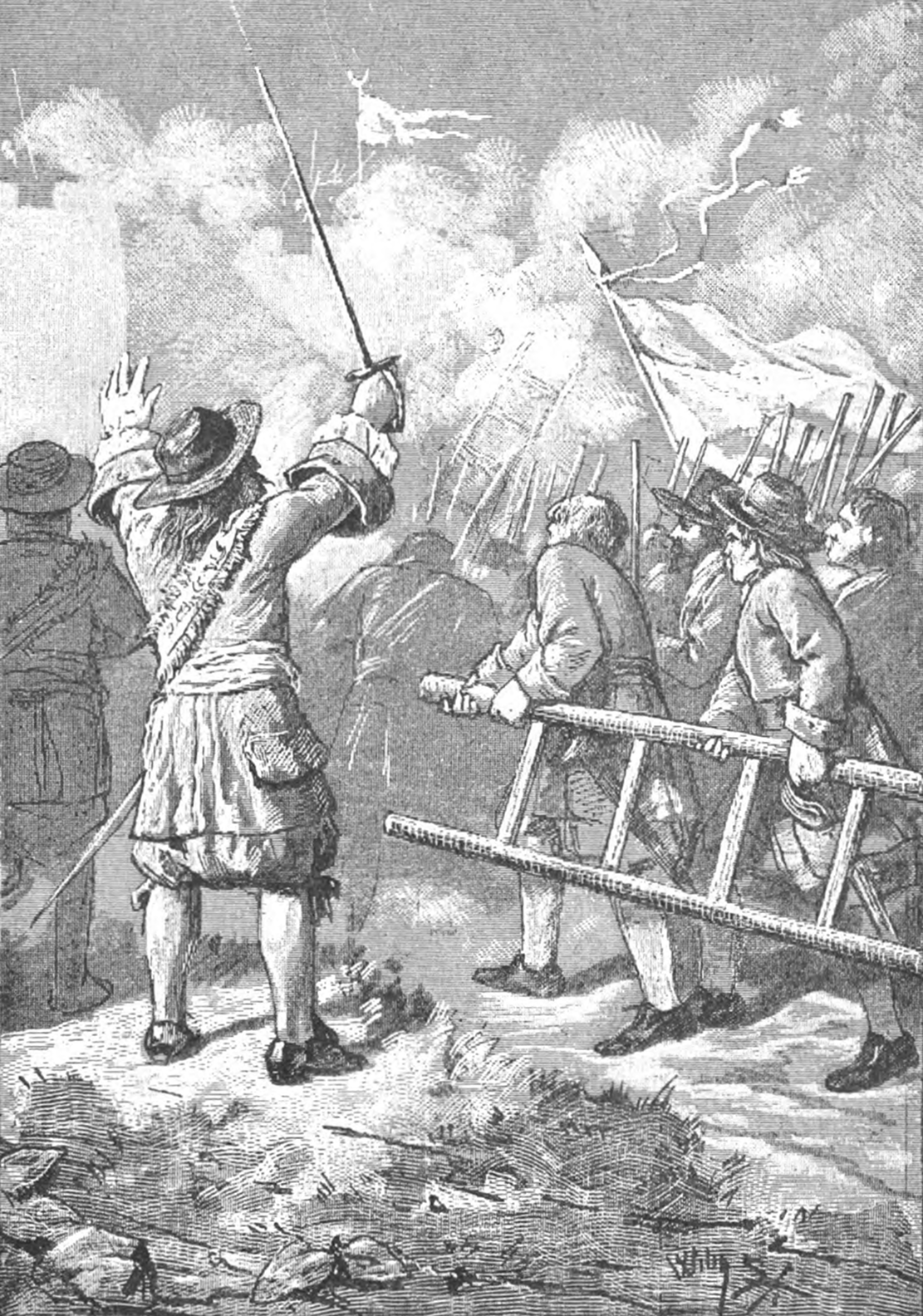
VOC troops storming Trunajaya's capital at Kediri in 1678. Depicted in an 1890 Dutch children's novel.

VOC and Mataram forces marched inland against Kediri in September 1678. Following a proposal by the king, the troops were split to take three parallel, less direct routes, to secure more territory and intimidate wavering factions into declaring loyalty. The king's idea worked, and as the campaign proceeded, local bands joined the troops, eager for booty. Kediri was taken on 25 November by an assault force led by Captain François Tack. The victorious troops proceeded to Surabaya, the largest city in East Java, where Amangkurat established his court. Elsewhere, the rebels were also defeated. In September 1679, combined VOC, Javanese, and Bugis forces under Sindu Reja and Jan Albert Sloot defeated Raden Kajoran in a battle in Mlambang, near Pajang. Kajoran surrendered but was executed under Sloot's orders. In November, the VOC and allied Bugis forces under Arung Palakka expelled the Makassarese rebels' stronghold in Keper, East Java. In April 1680, after what the VOC considered the fiercest battle of the war, the rebellious lord of Giri was defeated and most of his family was executed. As the VOC and Amangkurat won more victories, more and more Javanese declared their allegiance to the king.

After the fall of his stronghold in Kediri, Trunajaya managed to escape to the mountains of eastern Java. VOC and the king's forces chased Trunajaya, who, isolated and deprived of food, surrendered to the VOC on 26 December 1679. Though initially treated with respect by the VOC, Trunajaya was personally stabbed by Amangkurat II and the king's courtiers during a ceremonial visit to the royal residence at Payak. The king defended this killing of a VOC prisoner by saying that Trunajaya had tried to kill him. The VOC was not convinced by this explanation, but it chose not to call the king into account. A romanticised account of Trunajaya's death appears in the 18th-century Central Javanese babads.

=== End of Pangeran Puger's rebellion ===
In addition to Trunajaya's forces, Amangkurat II continued to face opposition from his brother Pangeran Puger, who had taken the old capital in Plered and had claimed the throne for himself in 1677. Before the defeat of Trunajaya, Amangkurat's forces had not taken action against him. After Trunajaya was defeated, Amangkurat still could not convince his brother to submit. In September 1680 Amangkurat constructed a new capital in Kartasura. In November, Amangkurat and VOC forces drove Puger from Plered. However, Puger quickly rebuilt his forces, took Plered again in August 1681, and nearly took Kartasura. In November 1681 VOC and Mataram forces again defeated Puger, and this time he submitted and was pardoned by his brother.

== Aftermath ==
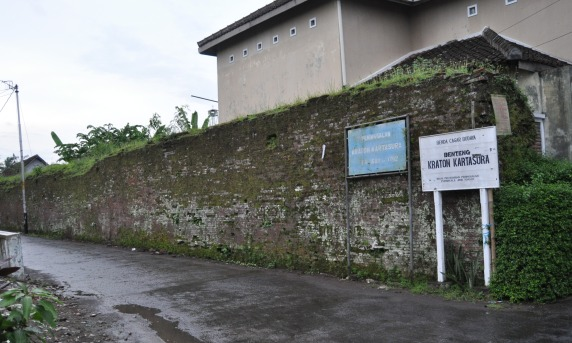
Remains of Mataram's new capital Kartasura. Amangkurat II built Kartasura and moved the capital there in the aftermath of the rebellion.

Amangkurat II secured his reign with the defeat of the rebels. Due to the rebel capture and subsequent destruction of the capital in Plered, he built a new capital, Kartasura, in the district of Pajang, and moved his court there. A VOC fort was constructed in the capital, next to the royal residence, to defend it against invasion. As for the VOC, its involvement allowed the cornered and nearly defeated Amangkurat II to stay on his throne. This began the precedent of the VOC supporting Javanese kings or claimants in exchange for concessions. However, in 1680 this policy required a high level of expenditure to maintain a military presence in Central and East Java, and this contributed to the VOC's financial decline. The payments promised by Amangkurat were not made, and by 1682 the king's debt to the VOC exceeded 1.5 million reals, about five times the amount of the royal treasury. The cession of Semarang was delayed by disputes, and other stipulations in the contract were largely ignored by local Javanese officials. Furthermore, an anti-VOC faction developed at the Mataram court, and a member of this faction, Nerangkusuma, became the patih (chief minister) from 1682 to 1686. Poor relations between Mataram and the VOC continued with the sheltering of Surapati, an enemy of the VOC, in 1684, and the death of VOC captain François Tack in the Mataram court in 1686.

The king's brother Pangeran Puger, who tried to claim the throne during the Trunajaya rebellion, was pardoned by the king. However, after the king died in 1703 and the accession of his son Amangkurat III, Puger claimed the throne again. Puger's claim was supported by the VOC, and the VOC–Puger alliance won the ensuing First Javanese War of Succession (1704–1708). Puger took the throne with the title Pakubuwana I and Amangkurat III was exiled to Ceylon.
