= Association of Indonesia Futsal Club =

- Formation: 14 June 2013
- Type: Sports organization
- Headquarters: Bandung, Indonesia
- Members: 12 clubs
- Chairman: (Indonesia) Arif Isnawan

The Association of Indonesia Futsal Club, commonly called AKFI (Indonesian: Asosiasi Klub Futsal Indonesia) is the sole, independent body directly representing futsal clubs at Indonesia level. AKFI exists to protect and promote Indonesian club futsal. Its aim is to create a new, more democratic governance model that truly reflects the key role of clubs in futsal.

== History ==
The teams that competed in the Indonesian Futsal League and Amateur Futsal League officially formed the Association of Indonesian Futsal Club (AKFI) on June 14 in Bandung, West Java. AKFI establishment itself is based on the form of their concern for futsal clubs in Indonesia.

== Structure ==
The AKFI Executive Board currently stands as such: Arif Isnawan (Chairman; IPC Pelindo), Bayu Saptari (first Vice-Chairman), Augi Yahya Bunyamin (second Vice-Chairman), Ikhlas Bahar (General Secretary; Brilyan Sport), Udex Ahmad Munzir (Vice-General Secretary; Trunajaya), Rulizar (Treasurer), Treza Aradea (Vice-Treasurer), Budiarto (Head of Organisational), Djusman H. Umar (Head of Research and Development), Efan Romeo Haliwela (Head of Public Relations), Lidemar Halide (Head of International Relations), and Adhanie Anggoro (Head of Promotions & Marketing). Elections for the Executive Board for the 2013-18 cycle are set to take place at the next General Assembly in Bandung on 14 June 2013.

== Founding members ==
The following twelve clubs founded the AKFI in 2013:

- IPC Pelindo Jakarta FC
- Futsal Kota Bandung
- Brilyan
- Trunajaya Bandung
- JICT FC
- Sriwijaya United
- Harimau Rawa
- Bank Jatim FC
- Bie The Great Bekasi
- Griya Pelem Sewu Futsal
- BKP Lampung
- Mayasari
