= Battle of Surabaya (disambiguation) =

The Battle of Surabaya was fought in 1945 as part of the Indonesian National Revolution.

Battle of Surabaya may also refer to:

- Mataram conquest of Surabaya (1614–1625)
- Battle of Surabaya (1677), a battle during the Trunajaya rebellion
- Battle of Surabaya (film), a 2015 Indonesian animated film

== See also ==
- Surabaya, a city in Indonesia
