= Raden Kajoran =

Javanese nobleman

- Died: 14 September 1679; Mlambang (today part of Gunungkidul Regency, Indonesia)
- Cause of death: Executed by the Dutch East India Company (VOC)
- Other names: Panembahan Rama
- Known for: Islamic religious figure; participation in Trunajaya rebellion
- Title: Raden, Panembahan
- Relatives: Trunajaya (son-in-law)

Raden Kajoran, also Panembahan Rama (died 14 September 1679) was a Javanese Muslim nobleman and a major leader of the Trunajaya rebellion against the Mataram Sultanate. He led the rebel forces which overran and sacked Plered, Mataram's capital in June 1677. In September 1679, his forces were defeated by the combined Dutch, Javanese, and Bugis forces under Sindu Reja and Jan Albert Sloot in a battle in Mlambang, near Pajang. Kajoran surrendered but was executed under Sloot's orders.

== Ancestors and family ==
Kajoran is a settlement south of present-day Klaten, Central Java. Raden is a title of Javanese nobility, and the title "Raden Kajoran" signified his status as the head of the ruling family there. According to the Javanese tradition, Sayyid Kalkum, Raden Kajoran's great-grandfather was the first of his family to settle in Kajoran. He was a younger brother of a holy man known as Sunan Tembayat, who was one of the first to introduce Islam to inland Central Java. Kalkum came into control of extensive territories in Kajoran in the early 16th century. The family was intermarried with the royal families of Pajang and Mataram. By the time of Raden Kajoran, the family had become a powerful and influential family in Mataram, due to both their Islamic authority and royal marriage ties.

== Biography ==
=== Before Trunajaya's rebellion ===
King Amangkurat I's reign saw the execution of many noblemen for suspicion of treachery, including the entire family of Pangeran Pekik (the former ruling dynasty of Surabaya) in 1659 and many members of the royal family at court during the 1660s. This brutality alarmed Kajoran, who began to sympathize with the king's rivals. When Trunajaya, a Madurese nobleman who were forced to live at court after his country's annexation, fled the court, Raden Kajoran took him in at Kajoran as a protégé and married one of his daughters to him. He also encouraged a friendship between Trunajaya and the Crown Prince of Mataram (Pangeran Adipati Anom, future Amangkurat II) who also had a grudge against his father the king.

=== Role in Trunajaya rebellion ===
The Trunajaya rebellion began in 1674 as Trunajaya's forces conducted raids against the cities under Mataram control. Kajoran joined the rebellion since at least 1676 after Trunajaya's victory at Gegodog in October. His knowledge of the internal Mataram affairs, as well as his reputation as a religious leader, provided support to Trunajaya and his Madurese warlords who were foreign to central Java.

He joined rebel troops marching towards Mataram's capital – led by Trunajaya's captains – at Taji, east of the capital. These troops attacked the capital district (the district of Mataram) in January or February 1677 but were repulsed by loyalist troops led by the royal princes. The defeated forces retreated to Surabaya, where Raden Kajoran joined his son-in-law Trunajaya. Subsequently, Mataram forces burned his district of Kajoran.

In April 1677, Kajoran started another attack on Mataram. His forces overran and sacked the capital Plered around 28 June 1677, marking the high point of the rebellion. There was talk that the western part of Trunajaya's realm (roughly today's Central Java), were to be declared a kingdom ruled by Kajoran, but he preferred to take the position of a spiritual lord rather than a king. Also, despite the proposal of dual rule, Trunajaya took all the treasuries captured from Plered for himself and denied it from Kajoran.

The rebels later withdrew from the now-ruined capital and Raden Kajoran moved to Totombo, in the hills south of Trunajaya's capital at Kediri, East Java, at Trunajaya's summon. This move – leaving central Java to be closer to Trunajaya – and his lack of heir contributed to the decline of his prestige and his followers' loyalty. However, his followers were still active in central Java, including the coastal districts (e.g. Jepara) and inland (in Pajang, bordering the capital district). They mounted major offensives on the northern coast (also known as the Pasisir) in November 1677 and June–July 1678. These activities frustrated both Mataram and its ally the Dutch East India Company (known by its Dutch acronym VOC), who also tried to establish a monopoly in the Pasisir.

In November 1678, Kediri was taken by VOC-Mataram troops and Kajoran returned to Central Java and established his new base at Mlambang (in today's Gunungkidul Regency, Yogyakarta Special Region). He allied himself with Raja Namrud or Nimrod, a Makassarese warlord who was active in central Java, and won some victories there between April and August 1679. However, on 14 September, a combined VOC-Mataram forces under Dutch Captain Jan Albert Sloot and Mataram leader Sindureja marched on his fortress at Mlambang. The attack ended in VOC-Mataram victory, Kajoran surrendered but Sloot ordered his execution. Due to his reputation, no Javanese leader wanted to kill him, so Sloot ordered a Buginese to do it.

== After his death ==
Kajoran's followers continued the resistance against Mataram after his death and Trunajaya's death in January 1680. They include members and relatives of the Kajoran family, religious men from Tembayat, and men from the Gunungkidul district. Their leaders include Kartapada, Kartanadi and Kartanagara.

== Personal characters and other names ==
Raden Kajoran was also known as Panembahan Rama and reputed to be skilled in shakti (cosmic power) and tapa (ascetism). Javanese chronicles called him "Raden Kajoran Ambalik" (Raden Kajoran the Deserter) due to his role in Trunajaya rebellion, and Dutch admiral Cornelis Speelman (one of his opponents during the war) called him "that prophet of the devil". Speelman also wrote that he taught his followers that "God and his Prophet will never bless the Javanese land again, as long as the kaffers [unbelievers, i.e. the Dutch] will be accepted there."
