= Karta Palace =

Palace in Java in the 1600s

Coordinates: 7.871553°S 110.397209°E

Karta Palace (also known as, Court of Karto, Keraton Karta) was a palace built by Sultan Agung in Central Java in the early 1600s. It was located approximately due south of the current locality of Kota Gede and just west of the Plered palace built by his son, Amangkurat I. The structure was important logistically for Agung as he was asserting his separation from the paternal/family palace at Kota Gede, and it was located closer to the ocean coast, which was of significance in the relationship of Mataram rulers with the Nyai Loro Kidul.

Little is known about the structure from non-Javanese sources, as few described or pictured it. The number of non-Javanese visitors was limited in number. It was known to be made in entirety in timber, and was prone to being damaged by fire.
