= Plered =

Location of former Javanese palace in Bantul, Indonesia

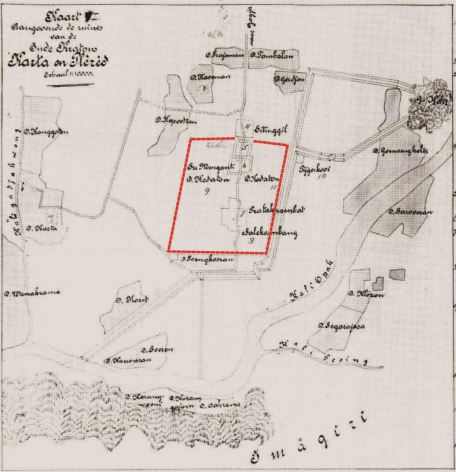
- A map of Karta and Plered, drawn by Gerrit Pieter Rouffaer based on his visit in 1889. The red box, indicating the wall around the Plered kraton, was presumably added later.

- The location of Plered in Java, Indonesia
- 7.863471°S 110.411285°E
- Type: kraton (palace), ruined
- Location: Bantul Regency, Yogyakarta, Indonesia

History
- Built: 1644-1647
- Built for: Sultan Agung and Amangkurat I
- Decayed: 19th century

Plered (also Pleret) was the location of the palace of Amangkurat I of Mataram (1645–1677). Amangkurat moved the capital there from the nearby Karta in 1647. During the Trunajaya rebellion, the capital was occupied and sacked by the rebels, and Amangkurat died during the retreat from the capital. His son and successor Amangkurat II later moved the capital to Kartasura. It was twice occupied by Diponegoro, during the Java War (1825–1830) between his forces and the Dutch. The Dutch assaulted the walled complex in June 1826, which was Diponegoro's first major defeat in the war.

Following the Java War, the town's decline accelerated and today it is in ruins. The remains are now located in the Bantul Regency, Special Region of Yogyakarta, Indonesia, close to the banks of the Opak River, and south of Kota Gede. It has been researched for archaeological remains It is located to the east of the site of Sultan Agung's Karta Palace at Karta. It is also the location of extensive irrigation and other water works that occurred at the time of the palace being used.

== History ==
=== Construction ===
Sultan Agung (1613–1645) built the previous court complex at Karta and moved the capital there in the first decade of his reign. The decision to move to a new capital might have been made during his reign in 1634 when a fire in Karta killed "many people of the court". In 1644, Sultan Agung started building an artificial lake in an area which became known as Plered. He died two years later and was succeeded by his son Amangkurat I. In 1647, shortly after taking the throne, Amangkurat built his royal residence near the lake and moved the court there. In contrast to Karta, which was made of wood, the royal compound at Plered was built of brick. Amangkurat continued to expand this complex up to 1666.

=== Fall of Plered during the Trunajaya rebellion ===
In 1677, during the Trunajaya rebellion, Plered was taken by the rebel forces, consisting of Madurese troops, as well as Javanese forces from East Java and the central northern coast, led by Raden Kajoran. The defenders, led by Amangkurat's four eldest sons, offered an ineffective defense and were defeated. Consequently, Amangkurat and the royal family fled the court, and soon after the rebels entered the complex and plundered it. The rebels also took the royal treasury of at least 300,000 Spanish reals. According to a man claiming to have witnessed the fall of Plered, Sp. Rl. 300,000 was taken to Trunajaya's capital in Kediri, while Amangkurat II (son and successor of Amangkurat I) later said that Sp. Rl. 150,000 was taken to Kediri while Sp. Rl. 200,000 remained in Plered with Trunajaya's local commander.

During the retreat, Amangkurat I died near Tegal and was succeeded by his son, Amangkurat II. Another son, Pangeran Puger occupied Plered after the rebels left and made a rival claim to the kingdom. Unable to take Plered from his brother, Amangkurat moved his capital to the newly built Kartasura in 1680.

=== During Diponegoro War ===
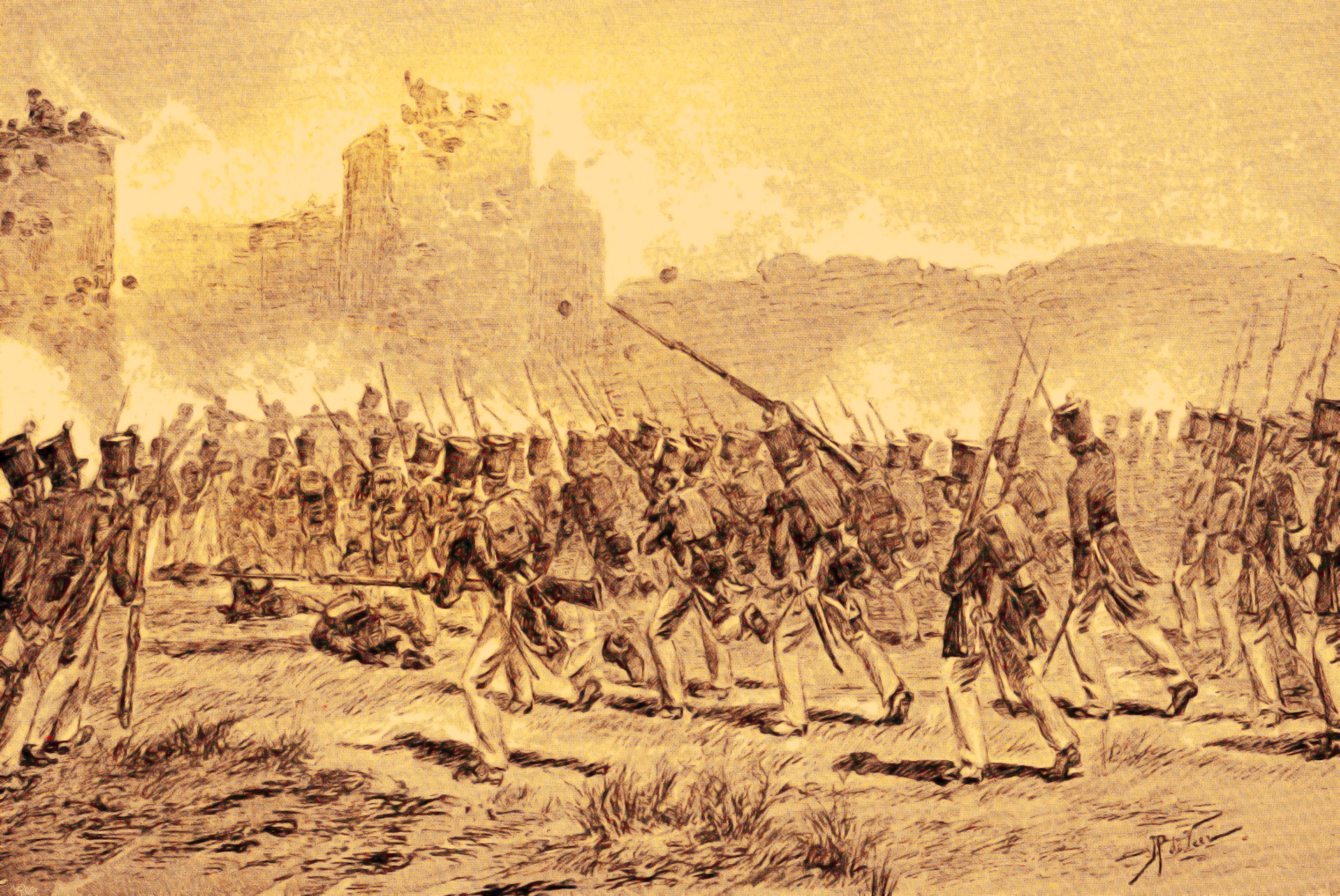
Bestorming van Pleret (1900) by G. Kepper, depicts the Dutch assault on Plered in 1826.

Although abandoned as a capital, Plered played another role during the Java War or the Diponegoro War (1825–1830) between the Dutch and the Javanese forces under Prince Diponegoro. Diponegoro occupied Plered in 1825 and kept his weapons and livestock there. He used it as a base to attack convoys supplying the nearby Imogiri held by the Dutch. In April 1826, the Dutch under General Van Geen attacked Plered. Diponegoro did not engage in combat and withdrew to the west. Van Geen entered Plered and took the weapons and livestock kept there as booty. Lacking forces to keep the town, he subsequently withdrew to Yogyakarta. Subsequently, Diponegoro reoccupied the town and fortified it. In June 1826, Dutch forces with a strong contingent of Madurese auxiliaries besieged the town. On 9 June, the besiegers detonated a mine under the ramparts, causing a breach through which they attacked. After a day of "bloody fighting", the attackers completely occupied Plered. This battle was Diponegoro's first major defeat in the war. The Dutch left a garrison of 700 men, and there was no further attempt from Diponegoro to retake it.

=== Decline ===
Following the Diponegoro War, the town's decline accelerated and when G. P. Rouffaer drew a map in 1889, it was already in ruins.

== Layout ==
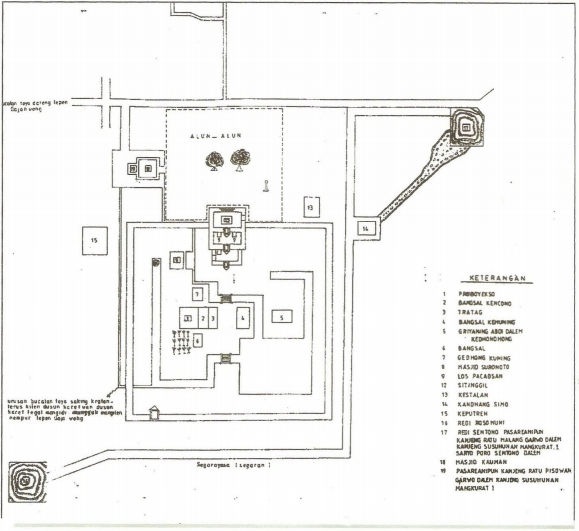
A map of Plered's walled kraton.

Because of the destruction of the buildings, the layout of Plered could only be approximated from historical reports, such as Van Goens' description of his 1648 visit to the palace, a map by Rouffaers based on his visit to the ruins in 1889, another map by Louw in 1897, and Javanese texts such as the babads as well as modern archaeological analysis of the site.

The kraton of Plered was a walled structure in a shape that is roughly square but not perfectly symmetrical. Van Goens wrote its circumference was 600 roede (2256 meters), while Indonesian archaeologist Widya Nayati estimated it to be 3040 meters. Rouffers' report said that the walls (which was then already destroyed) had been 5–6 meters high and 150 centimeters thick, Van Goens wrote that it was 18–20 feet high and 12 feet thick, and Indonesian archaeologists Alifah and Hery Priswanto estimated the thickness to be between 220 and 280 centimeters. The walls were made of bricks, tuff, and andesite.

Rouffers' map named some buildings inside the complex, including a mosque, a tiger cage, and names such as Sitiinggil, Keben, and Srimanganti. The tiger cage was the first known permanent tiger cage in Javanese courts. Around the walled complex, there were settlements named after their inhabitants, e.g. Kauman for the Ulama, Gerjen for the tailors (gerji in Javanese), and these names are still used today.

== Today ==
Today ricefields occupy most of the former enclosure. The remains of the town became a cultural heritage site ("Cagar Budaya"), located in Bantul Regency, Special Region of Yogyakarta.

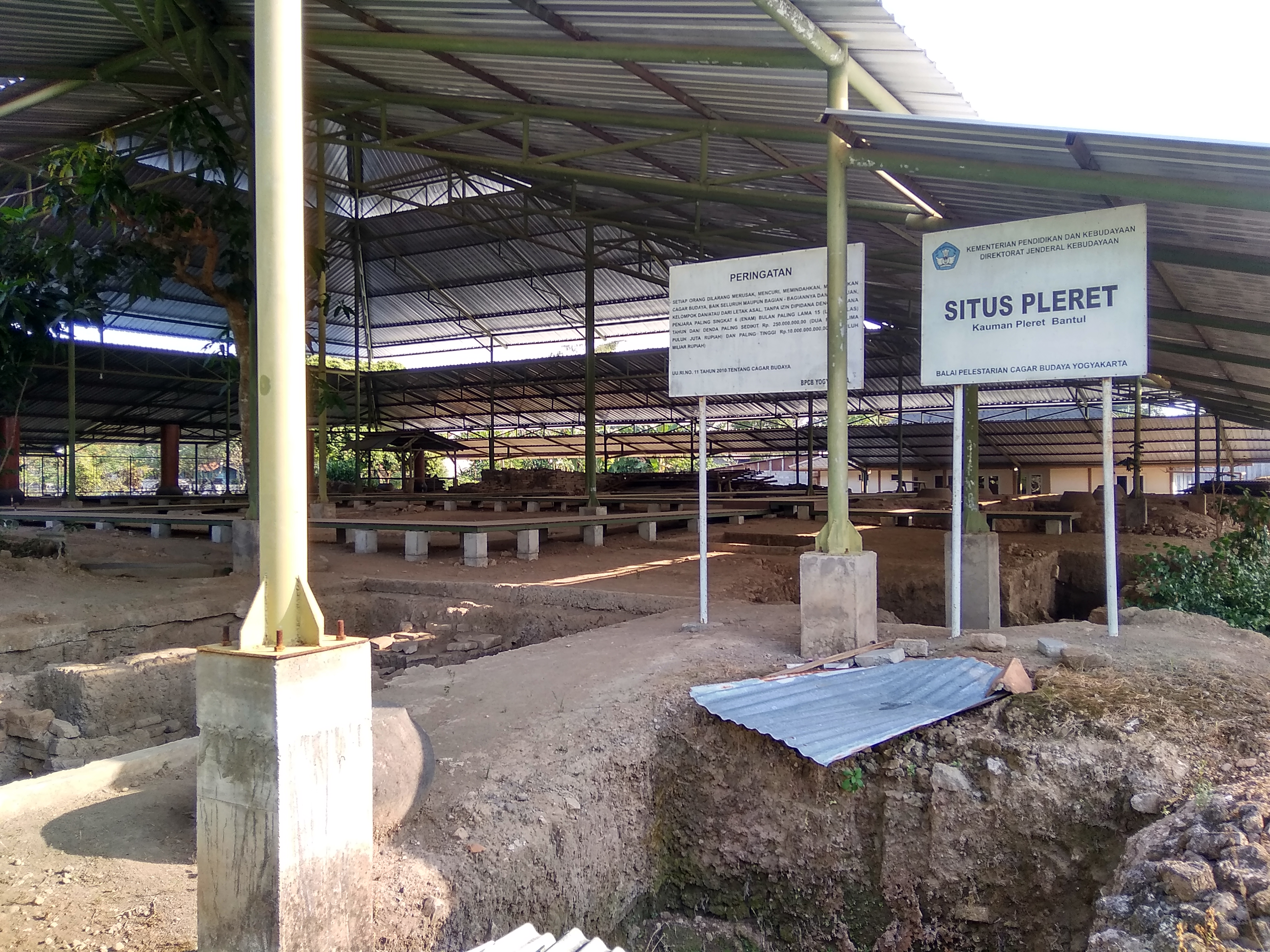
Plered archeological site of Kauman Mosque

== See also ==
- Yogyakarta
- Kota Gede

== Bibliography ==
- Ricklefs, M.C. (2008-09-11). A History of Modern Indonesia Since C.1200. Palgrave Macmillan. ISBN 978-1-137-05201-8.
- Pigeaud, Theodore Gauthier Thomas (1976). Islamic States in Java 1500–1700: Eight Dutch Books and Articles by Dr H.J. de Graaf. The Hague: Martinus Nijhoff. ISBN 90-247-1876-7.
- Yogyakarta Special Region (2015). "Kawasan Cagar Budaya Pleret". Geoheritage (in Indonesian).
- Dumarçay, Jacques (1989). "Plered, capitale d'Amangkurat I^{er}". Archipel (in French). 37 (1). PERSEE: 189–198. doi:10.3406/arch.1989.2570.
- Alifah; Priswanto, Hery (2012). "Benteng Kraton Pleret: Data Historis dan Data Arkeologi" [Fortress of the Pleret Palace: Historical and Archaeological Data]. Jurnal Berkala Arkeologi (in Indonesian). 32 (2). Yogyakarta: Balai Arkeologi Yogyakarta.
- Boomgaard, Peter (2008-10-01). Frontiers of Fear: Tigers and People in the Malay World, 1600-1950. Yale University Press. ISBN 978-0-300-12759-1.
- Riko P, Henki; Priswanto, Hery (2013). "Sebuah Informasi Mutakhir Hasil Penelitian Tahun 2013 di Situs Kedaton Pleret, Kabupaten Bantul, D.I. Yogyakarta" [Recent Information from 2013 Research on Kedaton Pleret Site, Bantul Region, D.I.Yogyakarta]. Jurnal Berkala Arkeologi (in Indonesian). 33 (2). Yogyakarta: Balai Arkeologi Yogyakarta.
