= Massacre of ulema by Amangkurat I =

Massacre of ulema by Sultan Amangkurat I
- Location: Sultanate of Mataram
- Date: 1648
- Target: Ulema and their family members
- Attack type: massacre
- Perpetrator: Government of Amangkurat I

Massacre of ulema by Sultan Amangkurat I was a mass killing that was committed in the territory of the Sultanate of Mataram at one afternoon in the year 1648. Around 5,000-6,000 ulemas and their family members were slain within less than thirty minutes. This massacre was ordered by Sultan Amangkurat I in order to exact revenge, since two days before his own younger brother Prince Alit tried to overthrow him. Although this coup failed and Prince Alit was killed during the ensuing chaos, Amangkurat intended to eradicate all groups who were allegedly conspiring with his younger brother.

== The right-hand men carrying out the plan and the signal from the palace ==
During the planning of this massacre, the Sultan wanted to ensure that the real mastermind behind the massacre would not be discovered. He instructed four of his right-hand men to carry out the plan; they were Prince Aria, Tumenggung Nataairnawa, Tumenggung Suranata and Ngabehi Wirapatra. According to historian H. J. de Graaf, Amangkurat wanted the ulema to be completely purged. The commencement of the massacre itself was signaled by a cannon fire from the palace. Local sources have failed to document the details of this massacre and the only reliable source that is available is a note made by an officer from the VOC, Rijcklof van Goens, who was being dispatched to Mataram at that time.

== Amangkurat feigning surprise ==
Amangkurat tried to cover up his involvement in this massacre. The day after the killings, he pretended to be angry and surprised. He alleged the ulema to be responsible for the death of Prince Alit and forced eight leaders to confess to their "crime" of plotting the overthrow of the Sultan. These eight men were slaughtered together with their family members.
