= Karaeng Galesong =

I Maninrori Kare Tojeng, also known as Karaeng Galesong, (Note: I Maninrori was his personal name, while I Kare Tojeng was his royal name. As a Makassarese nobleman, he was the karaeng (lord) of the Galesong area, hence the title Karaeng Galesong.) was a Makassarese nobleman and warrior, and a major leader of the Trunajaya rebellion in Java against the Mataram Sultanate. He participated in the successful invasion of East Java and the subsequent rebel victory at Battle of Gegodog (1676). He later fell out with Trunajaya, and built a stronghold in Kakaper, East Java. Dutch East India Company (VOC) and Bugis forces took Kakaper in October 1679, but Galesong escaped and rejoined Trunajaya. He died on 21 November 1679, either by illness or murdered by Trunajaya, before the rebellion ended.

== Biography ==
=== Early adventures ===
Makassar was the principal trading center east of Java. After the 1669 VOC victory over the Gowa Sultanate in the Makassar War, bands of Makassarese fighters fled Makassar, rejecting the terms of the Treaty of Bongaya imposed by the Dutch, and seeking their fortune elsewhere. Karaeng Galesong was a son of Sultan Hasanuddin, the defeated Sultan of Makassar who died in 1670. In early 1670s, Galesong led a band of Makassarese fighters and pirates to the Lesser Sunda Islands, and engaged in piracy there, especially in Sumbawa. On June 1673 he went to Bali and bought land to settle there. In either late 1674 or early 1675 Galesong moved to East Java and settled in Demung in the eastern salient of Java.

=== Alliance with Trunajaya ===
In 1675, Karaeng Galesong entered into an alliance with the Madurese prince Raden Trunajaya who was in rebellion against the Mataram Sultanate. The alliance was cemented by a marriage arrangement between Galesong and a niece of Trunajaya. As a condition for the marriage, Trunajaya asked Galesong and his followers to join a campaign against Mataram cities of Gresik and Surabaya in the northeastern coast of Java. By the end of 1675 both cities fell to the forces of Trunajaya and Galesong along with the areas between them, including the major port towns of Pasuruan, Pajarakan, Gombang and Gerongan. Having fulfilled the marriage condition, Karaeng Galesong married Trunajaya's niece in fall 1675. Galesong and his Makassarese followers hoped that by helping Trunajaya, in time Trunajaya would help them retake South Sulawesi from VOC and its Bugis allies.

In May–July 1676, Mataram and its ally the Dutch East India Company (VOC) counter-attacked and retook most of the rebel-held cities after hard fighting. Galesong fled from Panarukan in East Java to Trunajaya's base in Madura. In August or September, Trunajaya took the title Panembahan Maduretna, and granted the title Adipati Anom (a Javanese title usually given to the crown prince) to Galesong. Madura became a safe haven for the Makassarese to raid the nearby coasts and islands.

In September 1676, Galesong and Trunajaya invaded East Java again with an army of 9,000. This army defeated a much larger army under Mataram's crown prince at the Battle of Gegodog in October. This victory was followed by an offensive along the north coast of Java, resulting in the rebel army taking of most Mataram cities there.

=== Later campaigns and death ===
However, at the same time as the rebel victories, Galesong quarreled with Trunajaya. By late 1676 and January 1677 this evolved into an open conflict between the followers of the two. Galesong then settled in Pasuruan and did not help Trunajaya when his capital Surabaya was taken by the VOC in May 1677. Nevertheless, he refused to submit to Mataram or the VOC's authority.

During the subsequent VOC-Mataram campaign against Trunajaya's new capital in Kediri, Galesong's allegiance wavered. Initially, he sided with Mataram and unsuccessfully attacked Kediri from Pasuruan. However, he and 800 of his followers later broke with the VOC, established a fortification in Kakaper (or Keper) in East Java and pillaged the surrounding area. In October 1679, combined VOC-Bugis troops took this stronghold after a five-week siege. Galesong escaped with 60 men and rejoined Trunajaya. At this point he was very ill and died on 21 November 1679, either due to his illness or was murdered by Trunajaya for his treachery.

== Aftermath ==
Before his death he designated his son Karaeng Mamampang as heir to the leadership of the Makassarese band. As per his father's wishes, Mamampang, 16 or 17 years old at the time, asked his men to capitulate and return to Makassar via Surabaya. 120 Makassarese heeded this request, but the rest joined Trunajaya's men and continued the rebellion. However, on 15 December, as Trunajaya was cornered in the mountains of East Java, 2,500 Makassarese choose to surrender to the VOC rather than be destroyed. Trunajaya himself was finally captured on 25 December, with 30 or less Makassarese still with him.

== Legacy ==
He was buried in Ngantang, now part of Malang Regency, East Java, Indonesia. The grave was in the style of a Makassarese commoner instead of a nobleman. It was preserved, became a cultural site, and today attracts visitors and pilgrims. The epitaph, which was added later, reads in Arabic "Here lies a fighter in the way of God". On 2013, Indonesian former Vice President Jusuf Kalla – who like Galesong is from South Sulawesi – visited the grave along with other officials, and said that Galesong had shown that "people of South Sulawesi could be a fighter and be successful anywhere".
