= Pasisir =

Northern coastal region of Java

Pasisir is the name given to the northern coastal region of Java. Unlike the agricultural kingdoms of the hinterland, the pasisiran economy has been based on trade via the Java Sea and its cultural identity has been shaped by foreign contacts and the presence of Arab Indonesians and Chinese Indonesians.

Islam was established by the time of Zheng He's explorations between 1405 and 1433 and the region was briefly united under the Demak Sultanate, Java's first Muslim kingdom. It was here that the legendary Wali Sanga lived and proselytized. Following the First Javanese War of Succession the coast East of Cirebon was ceded to the Dutch East Indies Company and briefly administered as the North-East Coastal District. The present political division of the island into the provinces of West Java, Central Java and East Java corresponds to the interior kingdoms of Sunda, Mataram and Kediri.

== See also ==
- Great Post Road
- North Coast Road (Java)
- Peranakan
