= Amangkurat II of Mataram =

Susuhunan of Mataram (1677–1703)

- Sunan Amral
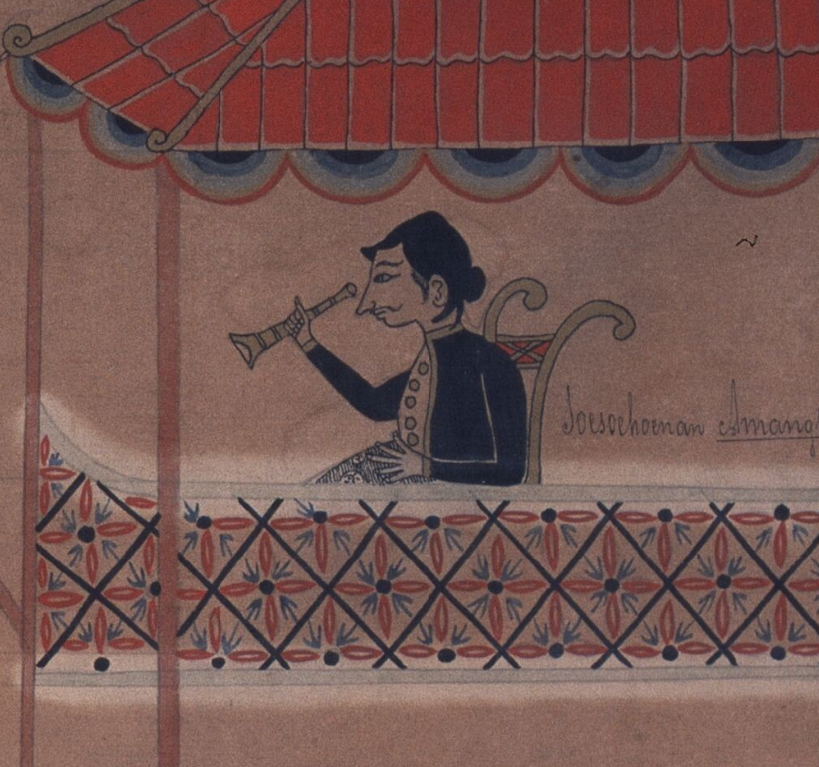
- Traditional Javanese illustration of Amangkurat II, housed in the Tropenmuseum

Susuhunan of Mataram
- Reign: 1677 – 1703
- Predecessor: Amangkurat I
- Successor: Amangkurat III
- Born: Raden Mas Rahmat
- Died: 3 November 1703; Kartasura, Mataram Sultanate
- Issue: Amangkurat III
Regnal name
- Sampeyan Dalem Ingkang Sinuhun Kanjeng Susuhunan Prabu Amangkurat Senapati ing Ngalaga Abdurrahman Sayyidin Panatagama Khalifatullah Ingkang Jumeneng Kaping II
- House: Mataram
- Father: Amangkurat I
- Mother: Ratu Kulon

Amangkurat II (also known as Rahmat; died 3 November 1703) was the susuhunan of the Sultanate of Mataram from 1677 to 1703. Before taking the throne, he was the crown prince and had the title Pangeran Adipati Anom.

He was the first Javanese monarch to wear a European-style uniform, thus gaining the nickname Sunan Amral, Amral rendering the meaning "admiral" in Javanese.

== Background ==
Born as Raden Mas Rahmat, he was the son of Amangkurat I of Mataram and Ratu Kulon, daughter of Pangeran Pekik of Surabaya.

Amangkurat II had many wives, but only one child, Sutikna (later Amangkurat III). According to the Babad Tanah Jawi, Sutikna's mother had used magic on Amangkurat II's wives to make them unable to conceive.

== Conflict within family ==
Rahmat was raised in Surabaya. He then moved to the Plered Palace as adipati anom (crown prince). However, his relationship with his brother, Prince Singasari, worsened. There was also news that the position of crown prince would be transferred to Prince Singasari.

In 1661, Rahmat rebelled against his father, supported by the anti-Amangkurat I faction. The small rebellion was suppressed but Amangkurat I unsuccessfully poisoned Rahmat in 1663, thus worsening their relations.

In 1668, Rahmat fell in love with Rara Oyi, a Surabayan girl who would become his father's concubine. Pangeran Pekik abducted her to be married to Rahmat. This made Amangkurat I angry and so he murdered Pangeran Pekik along with his family. Rahmat was pardoned after he was forced to murder Rara Oyi.

== Alliance with Trunajaya ==
Amangkurat I also relinquished the position of crown prince from Rahmat, and transferred it to Prince Puger (future Pakubuwono I).

In 1670, Rahmat asked for help from Panembahan Rama, a spiritual teacher from the Kajoran family. Panembahan Rama introduced his former son-in-law, Trunajaya of Madura, to be his assistant.

In 1674, Karaeng Galesong of Makassar and his followers came to Mataram. They requested a tract of land in Mataram but were rejected by Amangkurat I. They were hurt by the refusal and joined with Trunajaya, who rebelled in Eastern Java. Rahmat secretly gave them a tract of land in Demung, Besuki (now in Situbondo Regency).

With the merging of Karaeng Galesong and Trunajaya's faction, their collective force became larger and more difficult to control. Rahmat was anxious and decided to join his father's side. He regained his position as crown prince, as Prince Puger was born from a mother originating from the Kajoran family, which supported the rebellion. With the reunion of Rahmat and his father, Amangkurat I, the rebellion of Trunajaya and Karaeng Galesong became increasingly violent.

Ultimately, Trunajaya invaded the Plered Palace on 2 July 1677. Amangkurat I and Rahmat themselves escaped to the west, while the palace was defended by Prince Puger as proof that not all members of the Kajoran family supported Trunajaya. However, Prince Puger himself was ousted to Kajenar.

== End of Trunajaya rebellion ==
Amangkurat II became monarch in 1677 at the height of the Trunajaya rebellion. He succeeded his father, Amangkurat I, who died in Tegal after being expelled from Plered, his capital by Raden Trunajaya, a prince from Madura who captured the court in 1677. According to the Babad Tanah Jawi, Amangkurat I's death was caused by poison in his beverage, given by Rahmat, his own son. Despite that, Rahmat was still appointed as his successor.

In Tegal, Rahmat was welcomed by Martalaya, Regent of Tegal. Rahmat initially planned to make for pilgrimage (hajj) instead of fighting Trunajaya. But he suddenly cancelled his plan, reportedly because he received his wahyu keprabon (divine mandate). Rahmat then implemented his father's will to collaborate with the Dutch East India Company. Like his father, Amangkurat II was nearly helpless, having fled without an army nor a treasury. In an attempt to regain his kingdom, he made substantial concessions to the Dutch East India Company (VOC), who then went to war to reinstate him.

In September 1677, a treaty was signed in Jepara. The Dutch East India Company was represented by Cornelis Speelman. Most of the northern coast of Java, straddling between Karawang Regency and Panarukan, Situbondo Regency, was mortgaged to the Dutch East India Company as a guarantee of payment for the cost of war. For the Dutch, a stable Mataram empire that was deeply indebted to them would help ensure continued trade on favorable terms. They were willing to lend their military might to keep the kingdom together. The multi-ethnic Dutch forces, consisting of light-armed troops from Makasar and Ambon, in addition to heavily equipped European soldiers, first defeated Trunajaya in Kediri in November 1678, and Trunajaya himself was captured in 1679 near Ngantang west of Malang, and killed by Amangkurat II with his own hands on 2 January 1680.

== Giri Kedaton rebellion ==
The city-state of Giri Kedaton, which was a vassal of Mataram's from the time of Sultan Agung around the early to mid-17th century, had supported the Trunajaya rebellion. Panembahan Ageng Giri actively looked for support to strengthen the rebels' force.

Upon accession to the throne, Amangkurat II came to Kadilangu, Demak Regency, to meet Panembahan Natapraja, a wise, invulnerable, and smart elder who had soldiers who were ready to help Amangkurat I. Panembahan Natapraja, as a descendant of Sunan Kalijaga, was asked to rewrite the history of Java, as the original manuscript had been burned by rebels. This became the origin of the Babad Tanah Jawi. Amangkurat II also made an alliance and a treaty with the Dutch East India Company to gain weaponry support for revenge on Giri Kedaton.

Giri Kedaton became the last Trunajaya ally that had a large armed force. In April 1680, Panembahan Natapraja made a large-scale invasion towards Giri Kedaton, supported by the Dutch East India Company. The best commander who was also a reliable disciple of Giri Kedaton was Prince Singosari (Senopati Singosekar). He was eventually killed in action after dueling with Panembahan Natapraja. The latter's soldiers were small in number but they were still able to devastate Giri Kedaton.

Panembahan Ageng Giri was captured and sentenced to death by whip. His family was also exterminated. This marked the end of Giri Kedaton.

Separately in 1683, Wanakusuma, a Kajoran family member, rebelled. His Gunung Kidul-based rebellion was successfully suppressed.

== Building new palace ==
Since the fallen Plered was considered inauspicious, Amangkurat II built a new palace in the Wanakarta forest and moved the capital to Kartasura in the land of Pajang (which was between Mount Merapi and Mount Lawu, the southern point adjoining Mataram).

Prince Puger, who initially stayed in Kajenar, moved to Plered after being left by Trunajaya. He refused to join Amangkurat II because he heard of the news that Amangkurat II wasn't Rahmat (his half-brother), rather it was Cornelis Speelman's son disguised as Rahmat. The confusing news ultimately caused a chaotic condition.

The war between Plered and Kartasura occurred in November 1680. The Babad Tanah Jawi mentions it as a war between Mataram and Kartasura. Then, in 1681, the alliance of the Dutch and Amangkurat II forced Prince Puger, his younger half-brother, who styled himself susuhunan ing Alaga when he seized the throne, then proceeded to relinquish it after he surrendered on 28 November 1681.

The Babad Tanah Jawi relates that the Mataram Sultanate had fallen in 1677, and the Sunanate of Kartasura was the successor of Mataram, legitimized by Panembahan Natapraja of Kadilangu who was considered as a Mataram elder.

== Attitude toward the Dutch ==
Javanese chronicles depict Amangkurat II as a weak ruler who was easy to influence, while Prince Puger, his half-brother, had a deeper role in government. Amangkurat II ascended to the throne with the help of the Dutch and ended up having to pay for war costs for as high as 2.5 million guilders. An anti-Dutch official, Patih Nerangkusuma, was successful in persuading him to be rid of the debt.

By providing help in regaining his throne, the Dutch brought Amangkurat II under their tight control. Amangkurat II was unhappy with the situation, especially the increasing Dutch control of the coast, but he was helpless in the face of crippling financial debt and the threat of Dutch military power. The king engaged in a series of intrigues to try to weaken the Dutch position without confronting them head-on. For example, he tried to cooperate with other kingdoms such as Cirebon and Johor, and the court sheltered people that were wanted by the Dutch for attacking colonial offices or disrupting shipping, such as Untung Surapati. Amangkurat II gave him a residence in Babirong village, and Untung Surapati consolidated his strength there.

In 1685, Batavia (now Jakarta) sent Captain Francois Tack, the officer who captured Trunajaya, to Amangkurat's court at Kartasura, to capture Surapati and negotiate further details into the agreement between the Dutch and Amangkurat II. Francois Tack was killed when pursuing Surapati in Kartasura, but Batavia decided to do nothing since the situation in Batavia itself was far from stable, such as the insurrection of Captain Jonker, a native commander of the Ambonese settlement in Batavia, in 1689. Mainly due to this incident, by the end of his reign, Amangkurat II was deeply distrusted by the Dutch, but Batavia was similarly uninterested in provoking another costly war on Java.

Amangkurat II then approved Untung Suropati and Nerangkusuma to seize the Pasuruan Regency. Anggajaya, Regent of Pasuruan who was initially appointed by Amangkurat II himself, had to be a victim. He escaped to Surabaya, along with his brother, Anggawangsa.

The ambiguous attitude of Amangkurat II gained the attention of the Dutch East India Company, who found Amangkurat II's letters to the Sultanates of Cirebon, Johor, Palembang, and England, which urged to wage a war with the Dutch Republic. Amangkurat II also supported Captain Jonker's revolt in 1689.

The Dutch East India Company increased pressure on the Mataram court for the 2.5 million guilders war cost. Amangkurat II himself attempted to improve relations by pretending to invade Untung Suropati in Pasuruan.

== Death ==
Amangkurat II died in 1703 and was briefly succeeded by his son, Amangkurat III (r. 1703–1705), whose reign was marked by the First Javanese War of Succession.

== Notes ==
Preceded by Amangkurat I	Susuhunan of Mataram; 1677–1703	Succeeded by Amangkurat III
