= Amangkurat I of Mataram =

Susuhunan of Mataram (1646–1677)

- Susuhunan Prabu Amangkurat Agung
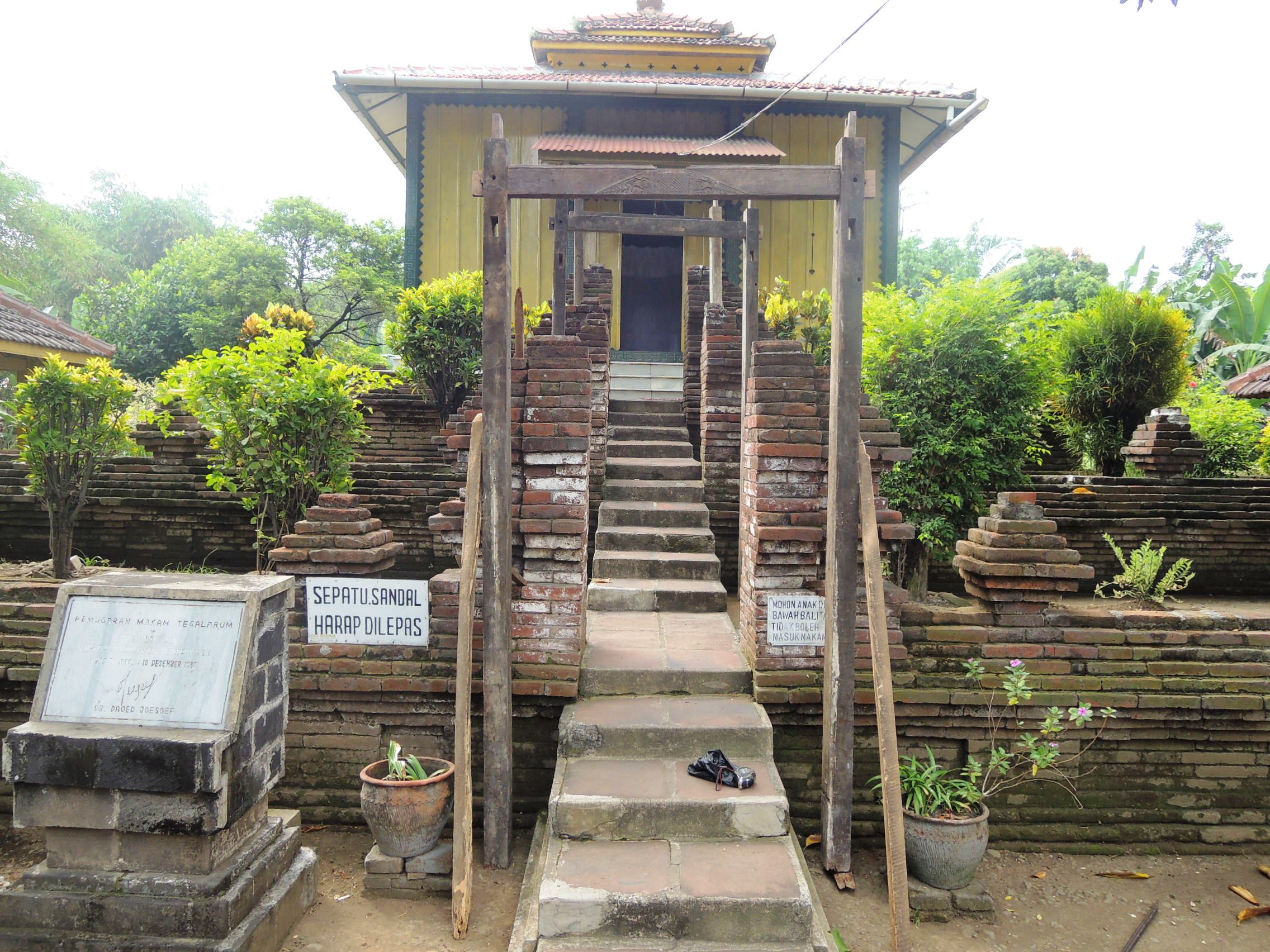
- The Grave of Amangkurat I in Tegal Arum Complex, Tegal Regency, Central Java.

Susuhunan of Mataram
- Reign: 1646 – 1677
- Predecessor: Sultan Agung
- Successor: Amangkurat II
- Born: Raden Mas Sayyidin; 1619; Kitha Ageng, Mataram Sultanate
- Died: July 13, 1677 (aged 57–58); Tegalarum, Mataram Sultanate
- Burial: Tegalarum Cemetery, Tegalarum, Mataram Sultanate
Regnal name
- Sampeyan Dalem Ingkang Sinuhun Kanjeng Susuhunan Prabu Amangkurat Senapati ing Ngalaga Abdurrahman Sayyidin Panatagama Khalifatullah Ingkang Jumeneng Kaping I
Posthumous name
- Sinuhun Tegalarum or Tegalwangi
- House: Mataram
- Father: Sultan Agung
- Mother: Queen Batang

Amangkurat I (Amangkurat Agung; 1619–1677) was the susuhunan of the Mataram Sultanate from 1646 to 1677, and was the son of Sultan Agung of Mataram.

Amangkurat was often in conflict with his own son, the crown prince Rahmat (the future Amangkurat II). When Amangkurat was deposed by the rebellion of Raden Trunajaya, Rahmat joined him in exile. According to the Babad Tanah Jawi, Rahmat intentionally poisoned his father and caused his death. The dying Amangkurat cursed his son, predicting that Rahmat's descendants would all fail to claim the throne for themselves.

He is known by historians as oppressive for purging nobles and massacring thousands of ulema to centralize power, creating a climate of fear that alienated the elite and destabilized his rule. He experienced many rebellions during his reign. He died in exile in 1677 and was buried in Tegalwangi (near Tegal). He was also nicknamed Sunan Getek because he was wounded when suppressing the rebellion of Raden Mas Alit, his brother.

== Early reign ==
In 1645, Amangkurat was appointed as the monarch or leader (susuhunan) of Mataram, succeeding his father. He was then styled Susuhunan Ing Alaga. Following his coronation in 1646, he was styled Kanjeng Susuhunan Prabu Amangkurat Agung, abbreviated as Amangkurat. In Javanese, the word Amangku means "to administer", and Rat means "world", thus Amangkurat means "administering the world". He then became a king who had full power over the entire Mataram Sultanate and its vassal states. At his coronation, all royal family members swore allegiance to him.

The death of Sultan Agung of Mataram was unexpected, and there was a risk of succession disputes and chaos. To prevent succession disputes from challenging his legitimacy, Agung's son Amangkurat I (crowned with heavy military security in 1646) launched several pre-emptive strikes (assassinations, massacres, and battles) to eliminate potential rivals to the throne, including many noblemen as well as religious and military leaders. He tightened his control over administration, appointing syahbandars under his influence to counter the power of local orangkayas (nobility) especially in the north city ports.

Amangkurat gained the vast territory of Mataram from his father and centralized control over his domains. Upon taking the throne, he tried to bring long-term stability to the sultanate's realm, which was considerable in size but marred by continual rebellions. He murdered local leaders that he deemed insufficiently deferential to him, including the still-powerful noble from Surabaya, Pangeran Pekik, his father-in-law. Other victims were Tumenggung Wiraguna and Tumenggung Danupaya, who were ordered to invade the Blambangan Kingdom which had been conquered by the Kingdom of Bali in 1647, but they were murdered en route to the east. Wiraguna's entire family was then murdered on Amangkurat's orders as well. This purge led his younger brother, Prince Raden Mas Alit (patron of the Wiraguna family), to attempt to overthrow him by attacking the royal palace with the support of Islamic clerics (ulema) and a devout Muslims faction in 1648, but they were defeated and Alit was slain in battle. Two days later, Amangkurat committed a massacre of the ulema and their families (about 5,000–6,000 people) to secure his reign. They were gathered in the alun-alun (city square) to be massacred.

Amangkurat alienated many regional nobles through oppressive rule, collapsing the consensus that supported the monarchy. This isolation weakened his ability to raise a large army, and he further undermined military strength by refusing to entrust command to anyone but himself.

Amangkurat also ordered the closing of ports, being linked to monopolise trade against the VOC, he did this to ensure trade revenue was funnelled directly to the court and to acquire the vassalage status Amangkurat believed the VOC had agreed to under a 1646 treaty and to receive gifts from this agreement. To further his glory, the new king abandoned the Karta Palace, Sultan Agung's capital, and moved to a grander red-brick palace in Plered (formerly the palace was built of wood).

== Foreign relations ==
Amangkurat I established a close relationship with the Dutch East India Company (VOC) who had previously fought with his father. In 1646, he allowed the Dutch East India Company to establish trade posts in Mataram territory, while Mataram was allowed to trade in other Dutch-ruled islands. They were also known to exchange prisoners with each other. The treaty was viewed by Amangkurat as a sign of the company's submission to Mataram rule. However, he was shocked when the VOC conquered the Sultanate of Palembang in 1659.

Hostility between Mataram and Banten also worsened. In 1650, Cirebon was ordered to conquer Banten but failed. Two years later, Amangkurat forbade rice and wood exports to the country. In the meantime, diplomatic relations between Mataram and Gowa (which had been established by Sultan Agung) were deteriorating. Amangkurat received embassies from Gowa in 1657 and 1658, he later demanded Sultan Hasanuddin come to the court in person in Java, of which Hasanuddin did not do. Jambi rejected Mataram suzerainty after 1663.

== Conflict with the crown prince ==
Amangkurat I was also at odds with his son and Crown Prince Rahmat (the future Amangkurat II). The conflict began with the announcement that the position of crown prince would be transferred to Prince Singasari (another of Amangkurat I's sons). Later in 1661, Rahmat led an unsuccessful rebellion against his father. Amangkurat suppressed the entire entourage of his son's supporters but he failed in Rahmat in 1663.

The crown prince felt that his life was not safe in the court after he took his father's concubine, Rara Oyi, with the help of his maternal grandfather, Pangeran Pekik of Surabaya, making Amangkurat suspicious of a conspiracy among the Surabayan factions to grab power in the capital by using Pekiks’ grandson's powerful position as the crown prince. Amangkurat sentenced his father-in-law, Pangeran Pekik, to death, on the charge of abducting Rara Oyi for the crown prince. Amangkurat forgave his son after forcing him to kill Rara Oyi with his own hands.

== Trunajaya rebellion ==
By the mid-1670s dissatisfaction with the king was turning into open revolt, beginning from the recalcitrant Eastern Java and creeping inward. RM. Rahmat conspired with Panembahan Rama of Kajoran, South Klaten, who proposed a stratagem in which the crown prince financed Rama's son-in-law, Trunajaya, to begin a rebellion in East Java. Raden Trunajaya, a prince from Madura, led the Trunajaya rebellion supported by itinerant fighters from faraway Makassar, led by Karaeng Galesong (supporter of Sultan Hasanuddin who had been defeated by Dutch East India Company in 1668), that captured the king's court at Mataram in mid-1677.

It is believed that a subsequent conflict occurred between Trunajaya and RM. Rahmat, causing Trunajaya not to cede power to him as planned before, and even plundered the palace. RM. Rahmat who couldn't control Trunajaya was eventually on his father's side.

The king escaped to the north coast with his eldest son, the future king, leaving his younger son Pangeran Puger in Mataram. More interested in profit and revenge than in running a struggling empire, the rebel Trunajaya looted the court and withdrew to his stronghold in Kediri, East Java, leaving Puger in control of a weak court. Seizing this opportunity, Puger assumed the throne in the ruins of Plered with the title Susuhunan ing Alaga.

== Family ==
- Queen consort of the West (Ratu Kulon), previously Ratu Pangayun of Surabaya, later Ratu Ageng
  - Raden Mas Rahmat, later Amangkurat II
- Queen consort of the East (Ratu Wetan), elevated to Ratu Kulon
  - Pangeran Adipati Puger, later Pakubuwana I
  - Raden Mas Pandonga, titled Pangeran Singasari
- Queen consort, Kanjeng Ratu Malang
  - Raden Subêkti, titled Pangeran Silarong
  - Raden Mas Rêsika, titled Pangeran Natapraja
- Queen consort, Kanjeng Ratu Kencana of Kranon
  - Raden Ayu Klêting Kuning
    - Brought by Trunajaya
- Queen consort, Kanjeng Ratu Amangkurat, previously Ratu Pasuruhan
  - Raden Mas Dadi, titled Pangeran Rănggasatata
- Concubine, Raden Langênkusuma of Banyumas
  - Raden Ajeng Putih, styled Raden Ayu Pamot
- Concubine, Raden Mangkukusuma of Mangkubumên
  - Raden Mas Kabula, titled Pangeran Mertasana
- Concubine, Mas Ayu Wulan
  - Raden Mas Sujanma, titled Pangeran Arya Panular
- Concubine, Mas Ayu Mayangsari
  - Raden Ajeng Brungut, styled Raden Ayu Klêting Kuning, changed to Raden Ayu Pucang
    - Married Raden Adipati Sindurêja, Patih of Surakarta
- Concubine, Mas Ayu Kênya of Priyêmbadan
  - Raden Ayu Klêting Biru
    - Married Bagus Buwang, titled Tumenggung Mangkuyudha
  - Raden Ayu Klêting Wungu
    - Married Raden Rangga of Kaliwungu
    - Married Adipati Mangkupraja
  - Raden Mas Tapa, titled Pangeran Arya Mataram
- Concubine, Rara Wilas
  - Raden Ajeng Mulat, styled Raden Ayu Klêting Abang
- Concubine, Bok Pantes of Pejagalan
  - Raden Ajeng Siram, styled Raden Ayu Klêting Ireng
- Concubine, Mas Tasik
  - Raden Ajeng Tungle, styled Raden Ayu Klêting Dadu
    - Married Raden Danurêja
- Concubine, Mas Ayu Danariyêm
  - Raden Ajeng Pusuh, styled Raden Ayu Klêting Ijo
    - Married Pangeran Adipati Wiramênggala

== Death ==
Soon after this episode, Amangkurat fell sick in exile. According to the Babad Tanah Jawi, his death was catalyzed by poisoned coconut water given by the crown prince. Despite this, he still appointed the crown prince as his successor, but along with a curse that none of the crown prince's descendants would ever become a king, except for one. Even that one would only rule for a short term. Amangkurat also made a will to his son to ask for help from the Dutch East India Company to seize the throne from Trunajaya.

Amangkurat died in the Wanayasa forest and was buried near his teacher near Tegal. Because of its fragrant soil, the village where he was buried would be known as Tegalwangi or Tegalarum. Twelve Dutch soldiers led by Oufers attended his funeral.

He was succeeded by his eldest son as susuhunan in 1677, who reigned as Amangkurat II.

== See also ==
- Massacre of ulema by Amangkurat I

| Preceded by Sultan Agung | Susuhunan of Mataram; 1646 – 1677 | Succeeded by Amangkurat II |
