= Trunajaya =

17th-century Javanese prince and warlord

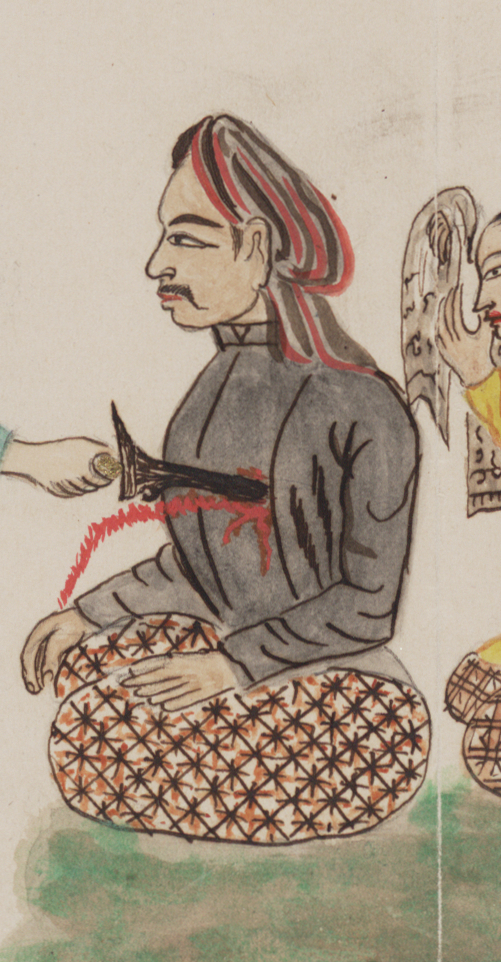
- Anonymous painting of Trunajaya stabbed by Sunan Amangkurat II, c. 1890 (KITLV)
- Born: 1649; Arosbaya (now Bangkalan), Madura, Mataram Sultanate
- Died: 2 January 1680 (aged 30–31); Payak, East Java
- Other names: Panembahan Maduretna Panatagama
- Known for: Trunajaya rebellion

Trunajaya (Madurese) or Tronajâyâ, also known as Panembahan Maduretno (1649 – 2 January 1680), was a prince and warlord from Arosbaya, Bangkalan, Madura, known for leading the Trunajaya rebellion (1674–1681) against the rulers of the Mataram Sultanate on the island of Java.

== Rebellion ==
Trunajaya was born in Madura. In 1674 he led a revolt against Amangkurat I and Amangkurat II of Mataram. He was supported by itinerant fighters from Makassar led by Karaeng Galesong. The Trunajaya rebellion moved swiftly, gained momentum, and captured the Mataram court at Plered in mid-1677.

The Mataram king, Amangkurat I, escaped to the north coast with his eldest son, the future king Amangkurat II, leaving his younger son Pangeran (Prince) Puger in Mataram. More interested in profit and revenge than in running a struggling empire, the rebel Trunajaya looted the court and withdrew to his stronghold in Kediri, East Java, leaving Prince Puger in control of a weak court.

While on his way to Batavia to ask the Dutch for help, Amangkurat I died in the village of Tegalarum near Tegal just after his expulsion, thus making Amangkurat II king in 1677. He too was nearly helpless, having fled without an army or a treasury. In an attempt to regain his kingdom, he made substantial concessions to the Dutch East India Company (VOC) in Batavia, who then went to war to reinstate him. In agreement, he promised to hand over the port town of Semarang to the Dutch if they lent him troops.

The Dutch agreed, since for them, a stable Mataram empire that was deeply indebted to them would help ensure continued trade on favourable terms. The multi-ethnic Dutch forces, consisting of lightly armed troops from Makassar and Ambon, in addition to heavily equipped European soldiers, defeated Trunajaya in Kediri in November 1678. Trunajaya himself was captured in 1679 near Ngantang west of Malang. He was executed by order of Amangkurat II in Payak, Bantul on 2 January 1680.

== Legacy ==
The Trunajaya rebellion is remembered with pride as a heroic struggle by the Madurese people, against foreign forces of the Mataram state and the Dutch VOC. Today Trunojoyo Airport in Sumenep and Trunojoyo University in Bangkalan, both in Madura, are named after him.
