= Mataram Sultanate =

Javanese sultanate, 1586–1755

Sultanate of Mataram Kesultanan Mataram (Indonesian) ꦤꦒꦫꦶꦩꦠꦫꦩ꧀ (Javanese) نَاڮَارِي كَسُلْطَانَن مَاتَارَام (Pegon)
- 1584–1755^{1} ^{2}
- Flag

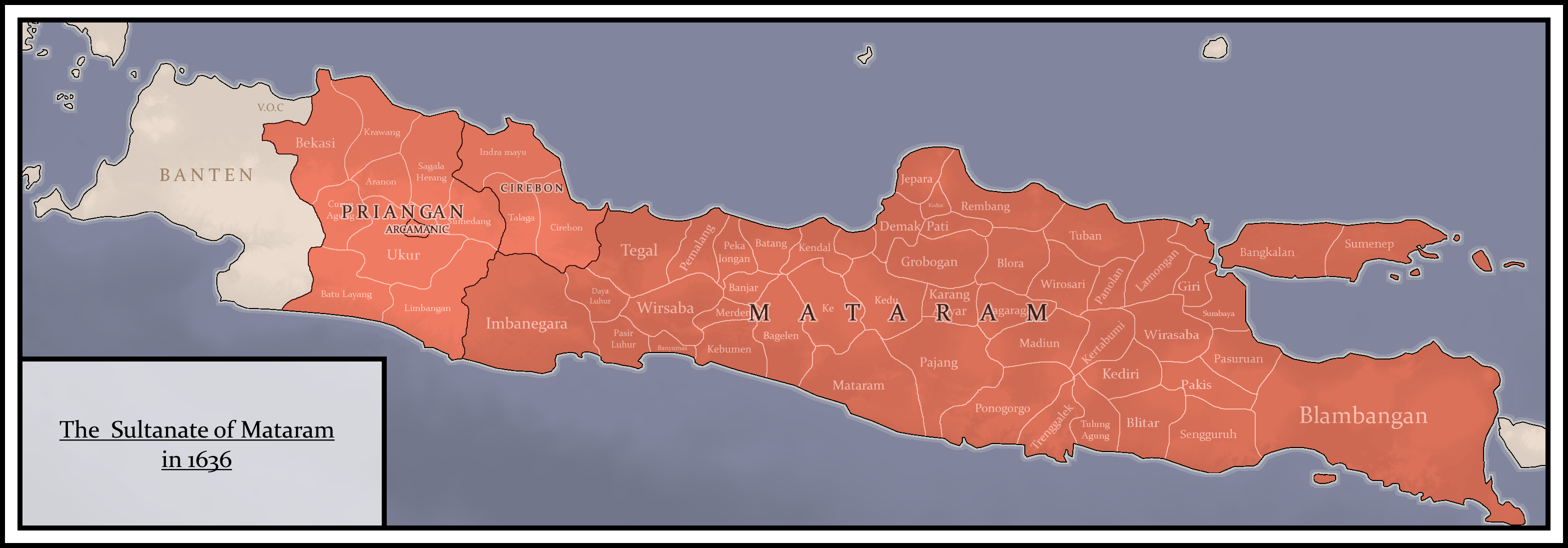
- The maximum extent of Mataram Sultanate during the reign of Sultan Agung Anyokrokusumo (1613–1645)
- Capital: Kota Gede (1587—1613); Karta (1613—1645); Plered (1646—1680); Kartosuro (1680–1745); Surakarta (1745-1755)
- Common languages: Javanese and Sundanese
- Religion: Sunni Islam
- Government: Monarchy
- King (Susuhunan / Sultan)
  - 1586–1601 (first): Senopati
  - 1613–1645: Sultan Agung
  - 1726–1745 (last): Pakubuwono II
- History
  - Independence from Pajang Sultanate: 1584
  - Treaty of Giyanti (divided onto Surakarta Sunanate and Yogyakarta Sultanate): 1755^{1} ^{2}
Preceded by
Kingdom of Pajang
Succeeded by
Surakarta Sunanate
Yogyakarta Sultanate
Dutch East Indies
- Today part of: Indonesia
- ^1The incident is referred to in Javanese as Palihan Nagari.^2From 1749 onto 1755, Sultanate of Mataram is a Vassal of Dutch East India Company

The Sultanate of Mataram (/məˈtɑːrəm/) was an early modern state based on the island of Java that lasted from the late 16th century to the 18th century. At its peak, Mataram was one of the most powerful kingdoms in the Indonesian archipelago and Southeast Asia. Along with Aceh and Makassar, it has been referred to as one of Southeast Asia's major "gunpowder empires." At its greatest extent, Mataram's territory spanned most of mainland Java and Madura, with vassals in Palembang, Sukadana, and Jambi.

Mataram reached its peak of power during the reign of Sultan Agung Anyokrokusumo (r. 1613–1645) after the conquest of his most powerful rival, the prosperous state of Surabaya. Sultan Agung's death set off a period of gradual decline as his successors endeavoured to consolidate his empire. The revolt of a Madurese prince in 1677 resulted in the sacking of the court and the death of Susuhunan Amangkurat I in exile. His son, Susuhunan Amangkurat II, requested military assistance from the Dutch East India Company (Dutch: Vereenigde Oost-Indische Compagnie; VOC), who then went to war to restore him. This preceded the enduring pattern of dispossessed princes instrumentalizing the military power of the VOC in exchange for payment and favourable treaties, by which means the kingdom gradually lost political and economic power to the VOC.

The First Javanese War of Succession and the Second Javanese War of Succession led to a further fracturing of the state, a diminishing in territory, and a waning in economic and political power. Following the ruinous Chinese Rebellion of 1741, Susuhunan Pakubuwono II ceded sovereignty over the Pasisir to the VOC. This preceded the Third Javanese War of Succession which ultimately resulted in the division of the realm into the Sultanate of Yogyakarta and the Surakarta Sunanate, with the VOC acting as broker. After the Java War (1825-1830), these states were demilitarized, diminished and integrated into the Dutch East Indies.

Descendants of the Mataram dynasty remain culturally and politically influential to the modern era. Susuhunan Pakubuwono XII and Sultan Hamengkubuwono IX were one of the first monarchs of the Dutch East Indies to recognize the Republic of Indonesia. The Sultanate of Yogyakarta remains the only monarchy officially recognized by the Indonesian government, its sovereigns holding special constitutional status as lifelong Governors of the autonomous province of Yogyakarta.

== Etymology ==
The name Mataram itself was never the official name of any polity, as the Javanese often refer to their realm simply as Bhumi Jawa or Tanah Jawi (lit. 'Land of Java'). Mataram refers to the historical areas of plains south of Mount Merapi around present-day Muntilan, Sleman, Yogyakarta, and Prambanan. More precisely, it refers to the Kota Gede area, the capital of the Sultanate on the outskirts of southern Yogyakarta.

A common practice in Java is to refer to their kingdom by metonymy, specifically by the location of its capital. Historically, there were two kingdoms that have existed in this region and both are called Mataram. The later kingdom, however, is often called Mataram Islam or "Mataram Sultanate" to distinguish it from the Hindu-Buddhist 9th-century Kingdom of Mataram.

== History ==
=== Formation and growth ===
==== Establishment of the Kingdom ====
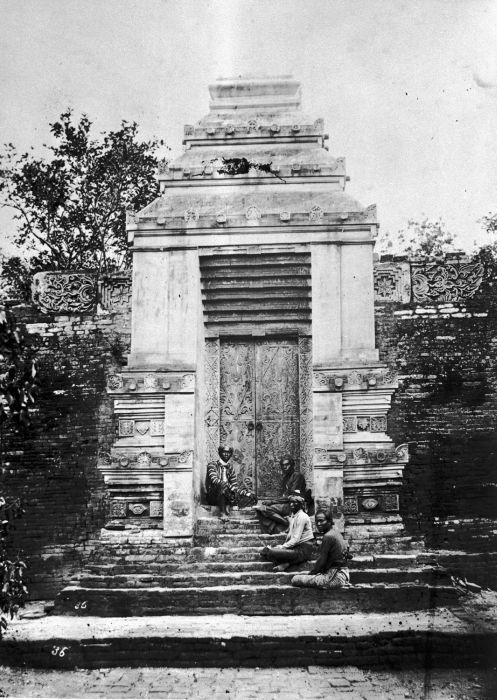
Kota Gede, the former capital of the Mataram Sultanate, founded in 1582 by Sutawijaya (Panembahan Senapati).

According to Javanese records, the kings of Mataram were descended from one Ki Ageng Sela (Sela is a village near the present-day Demak). In the 1570s, one of Ki Ageng Sela's descendants, Kyai Gedhe Pamanahan was awarded rule of the land of Mataram by the King of Pajang, Sultan Hadiwijaya, as the reward for his service of defeating Arya Panangsang, Hadiwijaya's enemy. Pajang was located near the current site of Surakarta, and Mataram was originally a vassal of Pajang. Pamanahan was often referred to as Kyai Gedhe Mataram. A kyai is a Muslim cleric who is well educated and tend to be well-respected.

Meanwhile, in Pajang, there were major power struggles that took place after the death of Sultan Hadiwijaya in 1582. Hadiwijaya's heir, Pangeran (Prince) Benowo, was ousted by Arya Pangiri of Demak, and was removed to Jipang. Pamanahan's son, Sutawijaya or Panembahan Senapati Ingalaga, replaced his father around 1584, and he began to release Mataram from Pajang's control. Under Sutawijaya, Mataram grew substantially through military campaigns against Mataram's overlord of Pajang and Pajang's former overlord, Demak. The new Pajang Sultan, Arya Pangiri, was an unpopular ruler, and Benowo quickly rallied support to regain his throne and recruited Sutawijaya's support against Pajang. Subsequently, Pajang was attacked from two directions: by Prince Benowo from Jipang and by Sutawijaya from Mataram, and was finally defeated. After the defeat of Pajang, Prince Benowo did not dare to stand against Senapati and agreed to bow down to him and submit Pajang to Mataram's rule. This event in 1586, marked the end of Pajang kingdom and the rise of its former vassal, the Mataram Sultanate.

==== The rise of Mataram ====
Senapati assumed royal status by wearing the title "Panembahan" (literally "one who is worshipped/sembah"). He revealed the expansive nature of his reign and began the fateful campaign to the East along the course of Solo River that would bring endless conflicts. In 1586, the wealthy port city of Surabaya rose against Panembahan Senapati. Senapati however was unable to penetrate Surabayan defence. He then conquered Madiun in 1590-1 instead, and turned east from Madiun to conquer Kediri in 1591 and Ponorogo. Perhaps during the same time he also conquered Jipang (present day Bojonegoro) and Jagaraga (north of present-day Magetan). He reached east as far as Pasuruan, who may have used his threat to reduce pressure from the then powerful Surabaya. After his campaign in Central and East Java, Panembahan Senapati turned his attention to the West, as he forced Cirebon and Galuh in West Java to acknowledge Mataram's overlordship in 1595. His effort to conquer Banten in West Java in 1597 — witnessed by Dutch sailors — failed, perhaps due to lack of water transport. Later, Demak and Pati revolted and their forces almost reach the Mataram capital, before Senapati's cavalry manage to destroy them. Panembahan Senapati died in 1601 and entombed in Kota Gede, he succeed on establishing a firm foundation of a new state. His successor, Mas Jolang or later known as Susuhunan Anyokrawati or Panembahan Sedo ing Krapyak, would face further rebellion.

The reign of Panembahan Anyokrowati (circa 1601–1613), the son of Senapati, was dominated by further warfare, especially against powerful Surabaya, already a major centre of power in East Java. He faced rebellion from his relatives who were installed in the newly conquered Demak (1601–4), Ponorogo (1607–8) and Kediri (1608). In 1612 Surabaya, again, rose against Mataram, as the response Anyokrowati conquered Mojokerto, destroyed Gresik and burned villages around Surabaya. Surabaya however, was still indomitable.

The first contact between Mataram and the Dutch East India Company (VOC) occurred under Susuhunan Anyokrowati. Dutch activities at the time were limited to trading from limited coastal settlements, so their interactions with the inland Mataram kingdom were limited, although they did form an alliance against Surabaya in 1613. Susuhunan Anyokrowati died accidentally that year when he was in Krapyak forest, hunting for deer. He was given posthumous title Panembahan Seda ing Krapyak (His Majesty who Died in Krapyak).

=== Golden age ===
Susuhunan Anyokrowati was succeeded by his son, Adipati Martapura. Adipati Martapura, however, was of poor health and quickly replaced by his brother, Raden Mas Rangsang in 1613, who assumed the title Panembahan ing Alaga, and later in 1641 took the title of Sultan Agung Anyokrokusumo ("Great Sultan"). The Mataram Sultanate under the reign of Sultan Agung is popularly remembered as the apogee of Mataram's rule on Java, and the golden age of native Javanese power prior to European colonisation in the following century.

==== Surabaya campaign and eastern conquests ====
Panembahan ing Alaga was an able military general and also a warlike ambitious leader, and he aspired to unite Java under Mataram's banner. He was responsible for the great expansion and lasting historical legacy of Mataram due to the extensive military conquests of his long reign from 1613 to 1646. Under Sultan Agung, Mataram was able to expand its territory to include most of Java after capturing several port cities of northern Java. Surabaya with its strong fortification and surrounded by swamps, was still the most formidable enemy of Mataram. In 1614, Surabaya forged an alliance with Kediri, Tuban and Pasuruan, and launched invasion against Mataram. In the following year, Sultan Agung managed to repel allied Surabaya forces in Wirasaba (present day Mojoagung, near Mojokerto). He also conquered Malang, south of Surabaya. In 1616, Surabaya tried to attack Mataram but this army was crushed by Sultan Agung's forces in Siwalan, Pajang (near Solo). The coastal city of Lasem, near Rembang, was conquered in 1616 and Pasuruan, southeast of Surabaya, was taken in 1617. Tuban, one of the oldest and largest port cities on the coast of Java, was taken in 1619.

Surabaya was Mataram's most difficult enemy. Senapati was not strong enough to attack this powerful city and Anyokrowati attacked it to no avail. Sultan Agung tried to weakened Surabaya by launching a naval campaign across Java Sea and capturing Sukadana, Surabaya's ally in southwest Kalimantan in 1622, and the island of Madura, another ally of Surabaya, was taken in 1624 after a fierce battle. Soon Madura's fortifications in Sumenep and Pamekasan fell, Agung installed Adipati of Sampang as the Adipati of Madura, stylised as Prince Cakraningrat I.

After five years of war, Agung finally conquered Surabaya in 1625. The city was taken not through outright military invasion, but instead through a siege; Agung installed a tight blockade from the land and sea, starving Surabaya into submission. With Surabaya brought into the empire, the Mataram kingdom encompassed all of central and eastern Java, also Madura and Sukadana on southwest Borneo, except for the west and east end of the island and its mountainous south (except for Mataram — of course). Sultan Agung consolidated his political unity by forging marriage alliance of his Adipati to the Princesses of Mataram. Agung himself took the hand of Cirebon Princess as his consort, in an effort to sealed Cirebon as Mataram's loyal ally. By 1625, Mataram was undisputed ruler of Java. Such a mighty feat of arms, however, did not deter Mataram's former overlords from rebellion. Pajang rebelled in 1617, and Pati rebelled in 1627. After the capture of Surabaya in 1625, expansion stopped while the empire was busied by rebellions.

==== Batavia campaign and western conquests ====
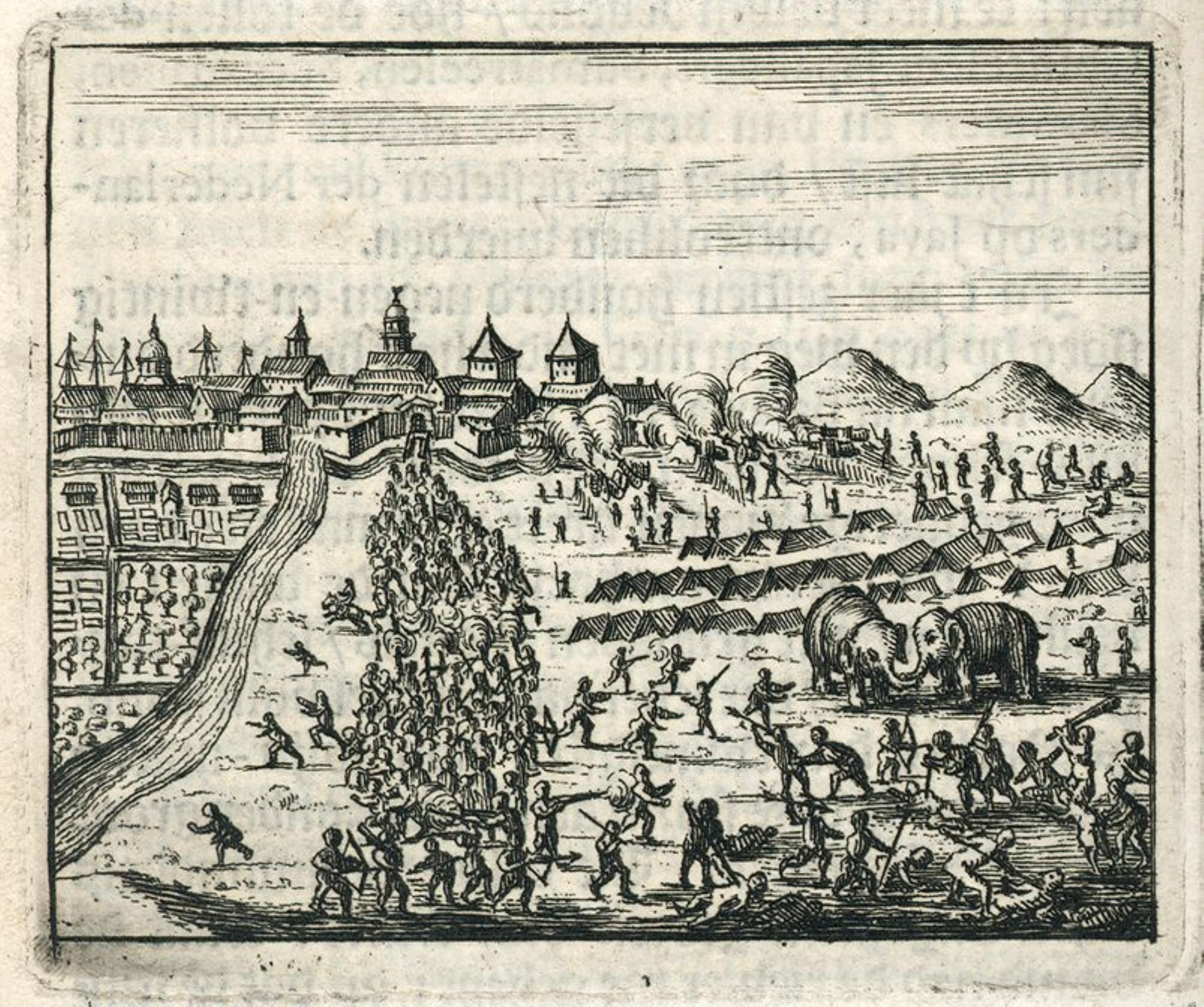
Siege of Batavia by Sultan Agung in 1628

Along western Java, Banten and the Dutch settlement in Batavia remained outside of Agung's control. In his effort to unite Java, Agung claimed Mataram as the successor state of Demak, which historically held Banten as a vassal state. However, the Banten Sultanate opposed Agung's claim, preferring to remain as a sovereign state. Agung therefore considered military conquest as a means to coerce Banten into Mataram's hegemony. However, if Agung were march his armies to Banten, the port city of Batavia would stand as a potential opponent too near to the proximity of the Banten region. This did not deter Agung from pursuing his claim as he already perceived Dutch rule of Batavia as a threat to the Mataram hegemony, thereby inciting further reason to march upon Batavia whilst en route to Banten.

In 1628, Agung and his armies began the siege of Batavia. The initial stages of the campaign against Batavia proved difficult due to a lack of logistical support for Agung's troops. To avoid a repeat of such inadequacy, Agung established farming settlements along the northern coast of West Java. This saw support from constructed rice barns and Javanese ships filled with rice rations to support Mataram troops. Upon discovery from Dutch ships and spies however, operations of these Javanese ships and rice barns were eventually put to a stop or burned down. As a result, large numbers of Mataram troops again suffered from ill-adequate logistical support and eventually, starvation. Agung's attempt to invade Batavia ultimately ended in failure.

==== Cracking down rebellions and eastern campaign ====
In 1630, Mataram crushed a rebellion in Tembayat (southeast of Klaten) and in 1631–36, Mataram had to suppress rebellion of Sumedang and Ukur in West Java. Ricklefs and de Graaf argued that these rebellions in the later part of Sultan Agung's reign was mainly due to his inability to capture Batavia in 1628–29, which shattered his reputation of invincibility and inspired Mataram's vassal to rebel. This argument seems untenable due to two reason: first, rebellions against Sultan Agung already began as far back as 1617 and occurred in Pati even during his peak of invincibility after taking Surabaya in 1625. The second, and more importantly, the military failure to capture Batavia was not seen as political failure by Javanese point of view. After the failed Batavia campaign, Gresik tried to regain power in East Java and led a revolt that quickly cracked down completely in 1635.

The sultan also launched a "holy war" against the still-Hindu Blambangan in the extreme eastern Java. At that time Blambangan kingdom was supported by Kingdom of Gelgel in Bali that treated it as a buffer against the Islamic expansion of Muslim Mataram. Blambangan surrendered in 1639, but quickly regained their independence in 1659 and rejoined Bali in 1697, after the Mataram troops withdrew.

In 1641, Javanese envoys sent by Agung to Arabia have arrived home after obtaining permission to wear the title "Sultan" from Mecca. Mecca also sent numbers of ulama to Agung's court. His Islamic name and title gained from Mecca is "Sultan Abdul Muhammad Maulana Matarami".

In 1645 Sultan Agung began building Imogiri, his burial place, about fifteen kilometres south of Yogyakarta. Imogiri remains the resting place of most of the royalty of Yogyakarta and Surakarta to this day. Agung died in the spring of 1646, leaving behind an empire that covered most of Java and stretched to its neighbouring islands.

=== Decline ===
==== Struggles for power ====
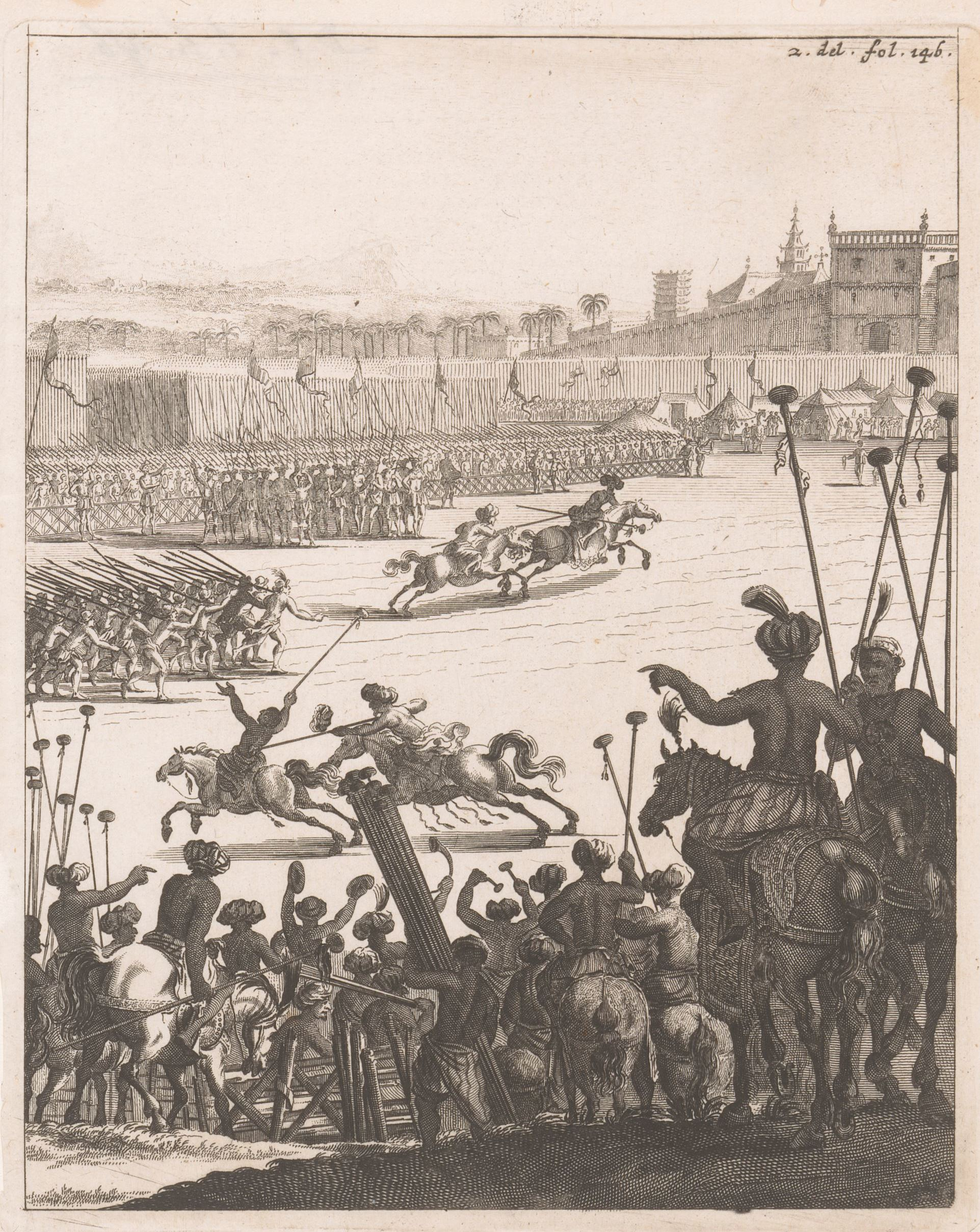
Jousting in Mataram, 1676.

Upon taking the throne, Agung's son Susuhunan Amangkurat I tried to bring long-term stability to Mataram's realm, by murdering local leaders that were insufficiently deferential to him, including the still-powerful noble from Surabaya, Pangeran Pekik, his father-in-law, and executed Panembahan Adiningkusuma (posthumous: Panembahan Girilaya), king of Cirebon, his son in-law. He also closed ports and destroyed ships in Javanese coastal cities to prevent them from getting too powerful from their wealth. This action devastated the Javanese coastal economy and crippled the Javanese maritime prowess that had been nurtured since the Singhasari and Majapahit era. This thus turned Mataram into a mainly agricultural inland kingdom for the next centuries. Because of this, Amangkurat I was notarized as a ruthless king. He even massacred 5,000–6,000 ulema and their family members due to their alleged involvement in a coup plot. Despite his political ruthlessness, unlike his father, Amangkurat I was not an accomplished military leader and dare not to pursue confrontation against the Dutch, as in 1646 he signed peace agreement with them. To further his glory, the new king abandoned Karta, Sultan Agung's capital, and moved to a grander red-brick palace in Plered (formerly the palace was built of wood).

By the mid-1670s dissatisfaction with the king was turning into open revolt, beginning from the recalcitrant Eastern Java and creeping inward. The Crown Prince (future Amangkurat II) felt that his life was not safe in the court after he took his father's concubine with the help of his maternal grandfather, Pangeran Pekik of Surabaya, making Amangkurat I suspicious of a conspiracy among Surabayan factions to grab power in the capital by using Pekiks’ grandson's powerful position as the Crown Prince. He conspired with Panembahan Rama from Kajoran, west of Magelang, who proposed a stratagem in which the Crown Prince financed Rama's son-in-law, Trunajaya, to begin a rebellion in the East Java. Raden Trunajaya, a prince from Arosbaya, Madura, led a revolt supported by itinerant fighters from faraway Makassar led by Kraeng Galesong. The Trunajaya rebellion moved swiftly and strong, and captured the king's court at Plered in Mataram in mid-1677. The king escaped to the north coast with his eldest son, the future king Amangkurat II, leaving his younger son Pangeran Puger in Mataram. Apparently more interested in profit and revenge than in running a struggling empire, the rebel Trunajaya looted the court and withdrew to his stronghold in Kediri, East Java, leaving Prince Puger in control of a weak court. Seizing this opportunity, Puger assumed the throne in the ruins of Plered with the title Susuhanan ing Alaga.

==== Amangkurat II and the beginning of foreign involvement ====
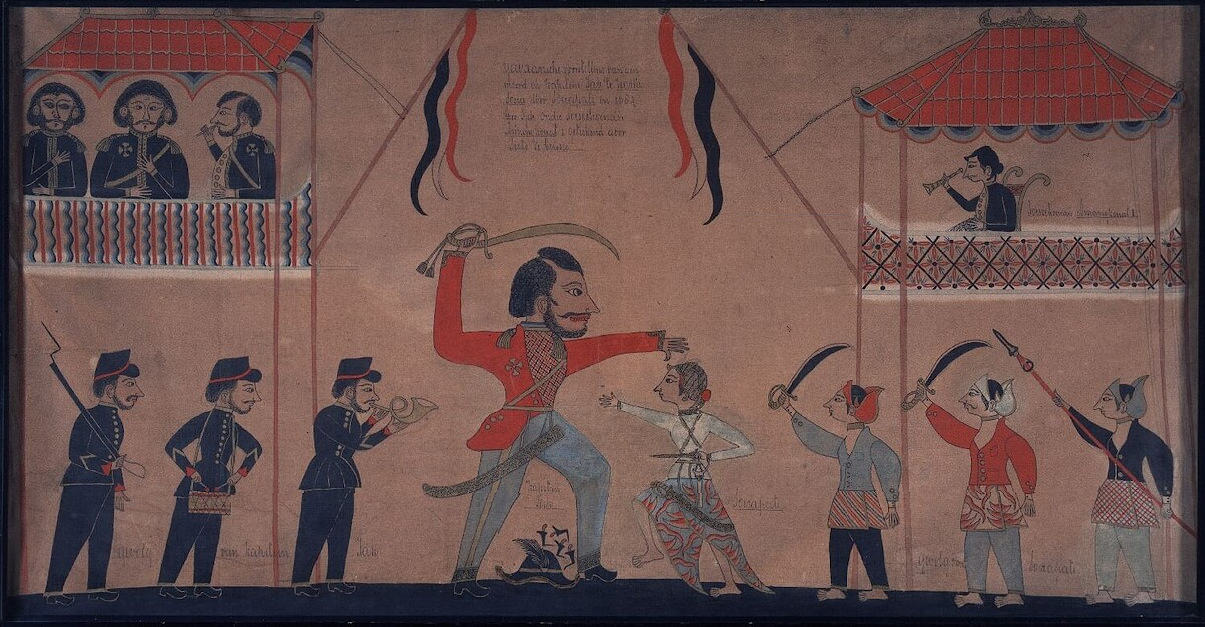
Sultan Amangkurat II of Mataram (upper right) watching warlord Untung Surapati fighting Captain Tack of the Dutch East India Company (VOC). ca 1684 AD.

On his way to Batavia to ask for Dutch's help, Amangkurat I died in the village of Tegalarum near Tegal just after his expulsion, making Amangkurat II king in 1677. He too was nearly helpless, having fled without an army nor treasury to build one. In an attempt to regain his kingdom, he made substantial concessions to the Dutch East India Company (VOC), who then went to war to reinstate him. He promised to give the VOC the port town of Semarang if they lend him some troops. For the Dutch, a stable Mataram empire that was deeply indebted to them would help ensure continued trade on favourable terms. They were willing to lend their military might to keep the kingdom together.

The multinational Dutch forces, consisting of light-armed troops from Makasar and Ambon, in addition to heavily equipped European soldiers, first defeated Trunajaya in Kediri in November 1678 and Trunajaya himself was captured in 1679 near Ngantang west of Malang, then in 1681, the alliance of the VOC and Amangkurat II forced Susuhunan ing Alaga (Puger) to relinquish the throne in favour of his elder brother Amangkurat II. In 1680, Amangkurat II ascended as the king of Mataram by receiving his crown from the Dutch. As the compensation for Dutch supports, other than Semarang, Mataram has to hand over Bogor, Karawang and Priangan to the VOC. Cirebon too was forced to shift allegiance from Mataram to the Dutch, and becomes Dutch's protectorate state. Since the fallen Plered was considered inauspicious, Amangkurat II move the capital to Kartasura in the land of Pajang (northern part of the stretch of land between Mount Merapi and Mount Lawu, the southern part being Mataram). The Dutch also erected a fort in Kartasura in an effort to control as well as protect the new capital.

By providing help in regaining his throne, the Dutch brought Amangkurat II under their tight control. Amangkurat II was apparently unhappy with the situation, especially the increasing Dutch control of the coast, but he was helpless in the face of a crippling financial debt and the threat of Dutch military power. The king engaged in a series of intrigues to try to weaken the Dutch position without confronting them head on; for example, by trying to co-operate with other kingdoms such as Cirebon and Johor and the court sheltered people wanted by the Dutch for attacking colonial offices or disrupting shipping such as Untung Surapati. In 1685, Batavia sent Captain Tack, the officer who captured Trunojoyo, to capture Surapati and negotiate further details into the agreement between the VOC and Amangkurat II but the king arranged a ruse in which he pretended to help Tack. Tack was killed when pursuing Surapati in Kartasura, then capital of Mataram (present day Kartasura near Solo), but Batavia decided to do nothing since the situation in Batavia itself was far from stable, such as the insurrection of Captain Jonker, native commander of Ambonese settlement in Batavia, in 1689. Mainly due to this incident, by the end of his reign, Amangkurat II was deeply distrusted by the Dutch, but Batavia were similarly uninterested in provoking another costly war on Java.

==== Wars of succession ====
Amangkurat II died in 1703 and was briefly succeeded by his son, Amangkurat III. However, this time the Dutch believed they had found a more reliable client, and hence supported his uncle Pangeran Puger, formerly Susuhunan ing Alaga, who had previously been defeated by the VOC and Amangkurat II. Before the Dutch, he accused Amangkurat III of planning an uprising in East Java. Unlike Pangeran Puger, Amangkurat III inherited family connection with Surabayan ruler, Jangrana II, from Amangkurat II and this lent credibility to the allegation that he cooperated with the now powerful Untung Suropati in Pasuruan. Panembahan Cakraningrat II of Madura, the VOC's most trusted ally, persuaded the Dutch to support Pangeran Puger. Though Cakraningrat II harboured personal hatred towards Puger, this move is understandable since alliance between Amangkurat III and his Surabaya relatives and Surapati in Bangil would be a great threat to Madura's position, even though Jangrana II's father was Cakraningrat II's son-in-law.

Pangeran Puger took the title of Pakubuwana I upon his accession in June 1704. The conflict between Amangkurat III and Pakubuwana I, the latter allied with the Dutch, usually termed First Javanese War of Succession, dragged on for five years before the Dutch managed to install Pakubuwana. In August 1705, Pakubuwono I's retainers and VOC forces captured Kartasura without resistance from Amangkurat III, whose forces cowardly turned back when the enemy reached Ungaran. Surapati's forces in Bangil, near Pasuruan, was crushed by the alliance of the VOC, Kartasura and Madura in 1706. Jangrana II, who tended to side with Amangkurat III and did not venture any assistance to the capture of Bangil, was called to present himself before Pakubuwana I and murdered there by the VOC's request in the same year. Amangkurat III ran away to Malang with Surapati's descendants and his remnant forces but Malang was then a no-man's-land who offered no glory fit for a king. Therefore, though allied operations to the eastern interior of Java in 1706–08 did not gain much success in military terms, the fallen king surrendered in 1708 after being lured with the promises of household (lungguh) and land, but he was banished to Ceylon along with his wives and children. This is the end of Surabayan faction in Mataram, and – as we shall see later – this situation would ignite the political time bomb planted by Sultan Agung with his capture of Surabaya in 1625.

With the installation of Pakubuwana, the Dutch substantially increased their control over the interior of Central Java. Pakubuwana I was more than willing to agree to anything the VOC asked of him. In 1705 he agreed to cede the regions of Cirebon and eastern part of Madura (under Cakraningrat II), in which Mataram had no real control anyway, to the VOC. The VOC was given Semarang as new headquarters, the right to build fortresses anywhere in Java, a garrison in the kraton in Kartasura, monopoly over opium and textiles, and the right to buy as much rice as they wanted. Mataram would pay an annual tribute of 1300 metric tons of rice. Any debt made before 1705 was cancelled. In 1709, Pakubuwana I made another agreement with the VOC in which Mataram would pay annual tribute of wood, indigo and coffee (planted since 1696 by the VOC's request) in addition to rice. These tributes, more than anything else, made Pakubuwana I the first genuine puppet of the Dutch. On paper, these terms seemed very advantageous to the Dutch, since the VOC itself was in financial difficulties during the period of 1683–1710. But the ability of the king to fulfil the terms of agreement depended largely on the stability of Java, for which the VOC has made a guarantee. It turned out later that the VOC's military might was incapable of such a huge task.

The last years of Pakubuwana's reign, from 1717 to 1719, were dominated by rebellion in East Java against the kingdom and its foreign patrons. The murder of Jangrana II in 1706 incited his three brothers, regents of Surabaya, Jangrana III, Jayapuspita and Surengrana, to raise a rebellion with the help of Balinese mercenaries in 1717. Pakubuwana I's tributes to the VOC secured him a power which was feared by his subjects in Central Java, but this is for the first time since 1646 that Mataram was ruled by a king without any eastern connection. Surabaya had no reason to submit any more and thirst for vengeance made the brother regents openly contest Mataram's power in Eastern Java. Cakraningkrat III who ruled Madura after ousting the VOC's loyal ally Cakraningrat II, had every reason to side with his cousins this time. The VOC managed to capture Surabaya after a bloody war in 1718 and Madura was pacified when Cakraningrat III was killed in a fight on board of the VOC's ship in Surabaya in the same year though the Balinese mercenaries plundered eastern Madura and was repulsed by the VOC in the same year. However, similar to the situation after Trunajaya's uprising in 1675, the interior regencies in East Java (Ponorogo, Madiun, Magetan, Jogorogo) joined the rebellion en masse. Pakubuwana I sent his son, Pangeran Dipanagara (not to be confused with another prince with the same title who fought the Dutch in 1825–1830) to suppress the rebellion in the eastern interior but instead Dipanagara joined the rebel and assumed the messianic title of Panembahan Herucakra.

In 1719, Pakubuwana I died and his son Amangkurat IV took the throne in 1719, but his brothers, Pangeran Blitar and Purbaya, contested the succession. They attacked the kraton in June 1719. When they were repulsed by the cannons in the VOC's fort, they retreated south to the land of Mataram. Another royal brother, Pangeran Arya Mataram, ran to Japara and proclaimed himself king, thus began the Second War of Succession. Before the year ended, Arya Mataram surrendered and was strangled in Japara by king's order, and Blitar and Purbaya was dislodged from their stronghold in Mataram in November. In 1720, these two princes ran away to the still rebellious interior of East Java. Luckily for the VOC and the young king, the rebellious regents of Surabaya, Jangrana III and Jayapuspita died in 1718–20 and Pangeran Blitar died in 1721. In May and June 1723, the remnants of the rebels and their leaders surrendered, including Surengrana of Surabaya, Pangeran Purbaya and Dipanagara, all of whom were banished to Ceylon, except Purbaya, who was taken to Batavia to serve as "backup" to replace Amangkurat IV in case of any disruption in the relationship between the king and VOC since Purbaya was seen to have equal "legitimacy" by the VOC. It is obvious from these two Wars of Succession that even though the VOC was virtually invincible in the field, mere military prowess was not sufficient to pacify Java.

==== Court intrigues in 1723–1741 ====
After 1723, the situation seemed to stabilise, much to the delight of the Dutch. Javanese nobility had learned that the alliance of the VOC's military with any Javanese faction made them nearly invincible. It seemed that the VOC's plan to reap the profit from a stable Java under a kingdom which was deeply indebted to the VOC would soon be realised. In 1726, Amangkurat IV fell to an illness that resembled poisoning. His son assumed the throne as Pakubuwana II, this time without any serious resistance from anybody. The history for the period of 1723 until 1741 was dominated by a series of intrigues which further showed the fragile nature of Javanese politics, held together by Dutch's effort. In this relatively peaceful situation, the king could not gather the support of his "subjects" and instead was swayed by short-term ends siding with this faction for a moment and then to another. The king never seemed to lack challenges to his "legitimacy".

The descendants of Amangkurat III, who were allowed to return from Ceylon, and the royal brothers, especially Pangeran Ngabehi Loring Pasar and the banished Pangeran Arya Mangkunegara, tried to gain the support of the Dutch by spreading gossips of rebellion against the king and the patih (vizier), Danureja. At the same time, the patih tried to strengthen his position by installing his relatives and clients in the regencies, sometimes without king's consent, at the expense of other nobles’ interests, including the powerful queens dowager, Ratu Amangkurat (Amangkurat IV's wife) and Ratu Pakubuwana (Pakubuwana I's wife), much to the confusion of the Dutch.

The king tried to break the dominance of this Danureja by asking the help of the Dutch to banish him, but Danureja's successor, Natakusuma, was influenced heavily by the Queen's brother, Arya Purbaya, son of the rebel Pangeran Purbaya, who was also Natakusuma's brother-in-law. Arya Purbaya's erratic behaviour in court, his alleged homosexuality which was abhorred by the pious king and rumours of his planning a rebellion against the "heathen" (the Dutch) caused unrest in Kartasura and hatred from the nobles. After his sister, the Queen, died of miscarriage in 1738, the king asked the Dutch to banish him, to which the Dutch complied gladly. Despite these faction struggles, the situation in general did not show any signs of developing into full-scale war. Eastern Java was quiet: though Cakraningrat IV refused to pay homage to the court with various excuses, Madura was held under firm control by the VOC and Surabaya did not stir. But dark clouds were forming. This time, the explosion came from the west: Batavia itself.

==== Chinese War 1741–1743 ====
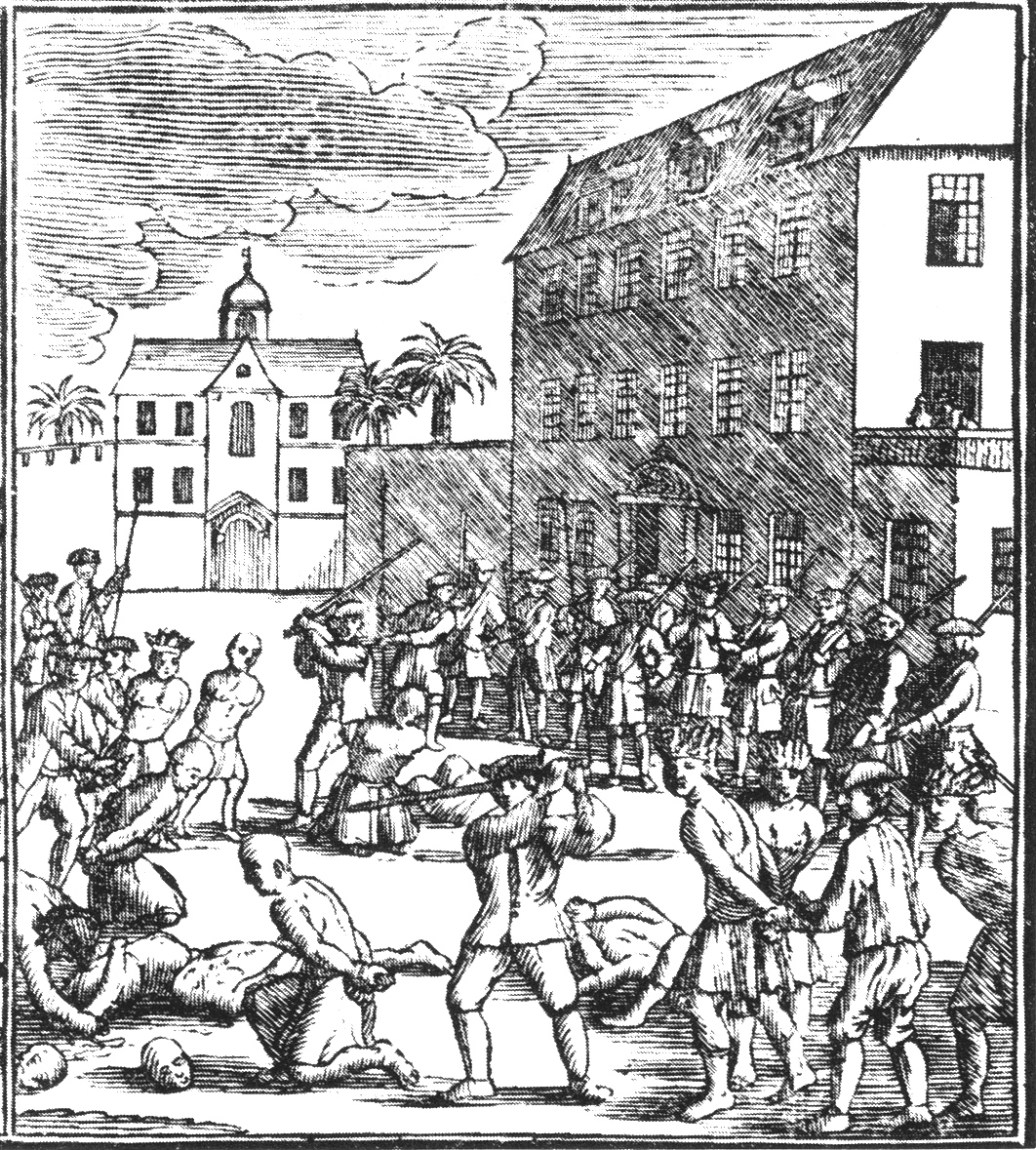
Chinese prisoners were executed by the Dutch in Batavia on 10 October 1740.

In the meantime, the Dutch were contending with other problems. The excessive use of land for sugar cane plantation in the interior of West Java reduced the flow of water in Ciliwung River (which flows through the city of Batavia) and made the city canals an ideal breeding ground for mosquitoes, resulting in a series of malaria outbreaks in 1733–1795. This was aggravated by the fall of sugar price in European market, bringing bankruptcy to sugar factories in the areas around Batavia (the Ommelanden), which were mostly operated by Chinese labour. The unrest prompted the VOC authorities to reduce the number of unlicensed Chinese settlers, who had been smuggled into Batavia by Chinese sugar factory owners. These labourers were loaded onto ships out of Batavia but the rumour that these people were thrown into the sea as soon as the ship was beyond the horizon caused panic among the remaining Chinese. On 7 October 1740, several Chinese mobs attacked Europeans outside the city and incited the Dutch to order a massacre two days later. The Chinese settlement in Batavia was looted for several days, in which 10,000 Chinese were killed. The Chinese ran away and captured Bekasi, which was dislodged by the VOC in June 1741.

In 1741, Chinese rebels were present in Central Java, particularly around Welahan, Pati, Grobogan, and Kaliwungu. In May 1741 Juwana was captured by the Chinese. The Javanese at first sided with the Dutch and reinforced Demak on 10 June 1741. Two days later, a detachment of Javanese forces together with the VOC forces of Europeans, Balinese and Buginese in Semarang to defend Tugu, west of Semarang. The Chinese rebel lured them into their main forces's position in Mount Bergota through narrow road and ambushed them. The allied forces were dispersed and ran as fast as they could back to Semarang. The Chinese pursued them but were repulsed by Dutch cannons in the fortress. Semarang was seized by panic. By July 1741, the Chinese occupied Kaligawe, south of Semarang, Rembang, and besieged Jepara. This is the most dangerous time for the VOC. Military superiority would enable the VOC to hold Semarang without any support from Mataram forces, but it would mean nothing since a turbulent interior would disrupt trade and therefore profit, the VOC's main objective. One VOC high official, Abraham Roos, suggested that the VOC assumed royal function in Java by denying Pakubuwana II's "legitimacy" and asking the regents to take an oath of loyalty to the VOC's sovereignty. This was turned down by the Council of Indies (Raad van Indie) in Batavia, since even if the VOC managed to conquer the coast, it would not be strong enough to conquer the mountainous interior of Java, which do not provide much level plain required by Western method of warfare. Therefore, the Dutch East India Company must support its superior but inadequate military by picking the right allies. One such ally had presented itself, that is Cakraningkrat IV of Madura who could be relied on to hold the eastern coast against the Chinese, but the interior of Eastern and Central Java was beyond the reach of this quarrelsome prince. Therefore, the VOC had no choice but to side with Pakubuwana II.

The VOC's dire situation after the Battle of Tugu in July 1741 did not escape the king's attention, but – like Amangkurat II – he avoided any open breach with the VOC since his own kraton was not lacking of factions against him. He ordered Patih Natakusuma to do all the dirty work, such as ordering the Arch-Regent (Adipati) of Jipang (Bojonegoro), one Tumenggung Mataun, to join the Chinese. In September 1741, the king ordered Patih Natakusuma and several regents to help the Chinese besiege Semarang and let Natakusuma attack the VOC garrison in Kartasura, who were starved into submission in August. However, reinforcement from the VOC's posts in Outer Islands were arriving since August and they were all wisely concentrated to repel the Chinese around Semarang. In the beginning of November, the Dutch attacked Kaligawe, Torbaya around Semarang, and repulsed the alliance of Javanese and Chinese forces who were stationed in four separate fortress and did not co-ordinate with each other. At the end of November, Cakraningrat IV had controlled the stretch of east coast from Tuban to Sedayu and the Dutch relieved Tegal of Chinese rebels. This caused Pakubuwana II to change sides and open negotiations with the Dutch.

In the next year 1742, the alliance of Javanese and Chinese let Semarang alone and captured Kudus and Pati in February. In March, Pakubuwana II sent a messenger to negotiate with the Dutch in Semarang and offered them absolute control over all northern coasts of Java and the privilege to appoint patih. The VOC promptly sent van Hohendorff with a small force to observe the situation in Kartasura. Things began to get worse for Pakubuwana II. In April, the rebels set up Raden Mas Garendi, a descendant of Amangkurat III, as king with the title of Sunan Kuning.

In May, the Dutch agreed to support Pakubuwana II after considering that after all, the regencies in eastern interior were still loyal to this weak king but the Javano-Chinese rebel alliance had occupied the only road from Semarang to Kartasura and captured Salatiga. The princes in Mataram tried to attack the Javano-Chinese alliance but they were repulsed. On 30 June 1742, the rebels captured Kartasura and van Hohendorff had to run away from a hole in kraton wall with the helpless Pakubuwana II on his back. The Dutch, however, ignored Kartasura's fate in rebel hands and concentrated its forces under Captain Gerrit mother and Nathaniel Steinmets to repulse the rebels around Demak, Welahan, Jepara, Kudus and Rembang. By October 1742, the northern coast of Central Java was cleaned of the rebels, who seemed to disperse into the traditional rebel hideout in Malang to the east and the Dutch forces returned to Semarang in November. Cakraningrat IV, who wished to free the eastern coast of Java from Mataram influence, could not deter the Dutch from supporting Pakubuwana II but he managed to capture and plunder Kartasura in November 1742. In December 1742, the VOC negotiated with Cakraningrat and managed to persuade him to relieve Kartasura of Madurese and Balinese troops under his pay. The treasures, however, remained in Cakraningrat's hand.

The reinstatement of Pakubuwana II in Kartasura on 14 December 1742 marked the end of the Chinese war. It showed who was in control of the situation. Accordingly, Sunan Kuning surrendered in October 1743, followed by other rebel leaders. In the mid-18th century, Mataram lost much of their lands, by 1743 Mataram only consists of areas around Surakarta, Yogyakarta, Kedu and Bagelen. Cakraningrat IV was definitely not pleased with this situation and he began to make alliance with Surabaya, the descendants of Untung Surapati, and hired more Balinese mercenaries. He stopped paying tribute to the VOC in 1744, and after a failed attempt to negotiate, the Dutch attacked Madura in 1745 and ousted Cakraningrat, who was banished to the Cape in 1746.

=== Division of Mataram ===
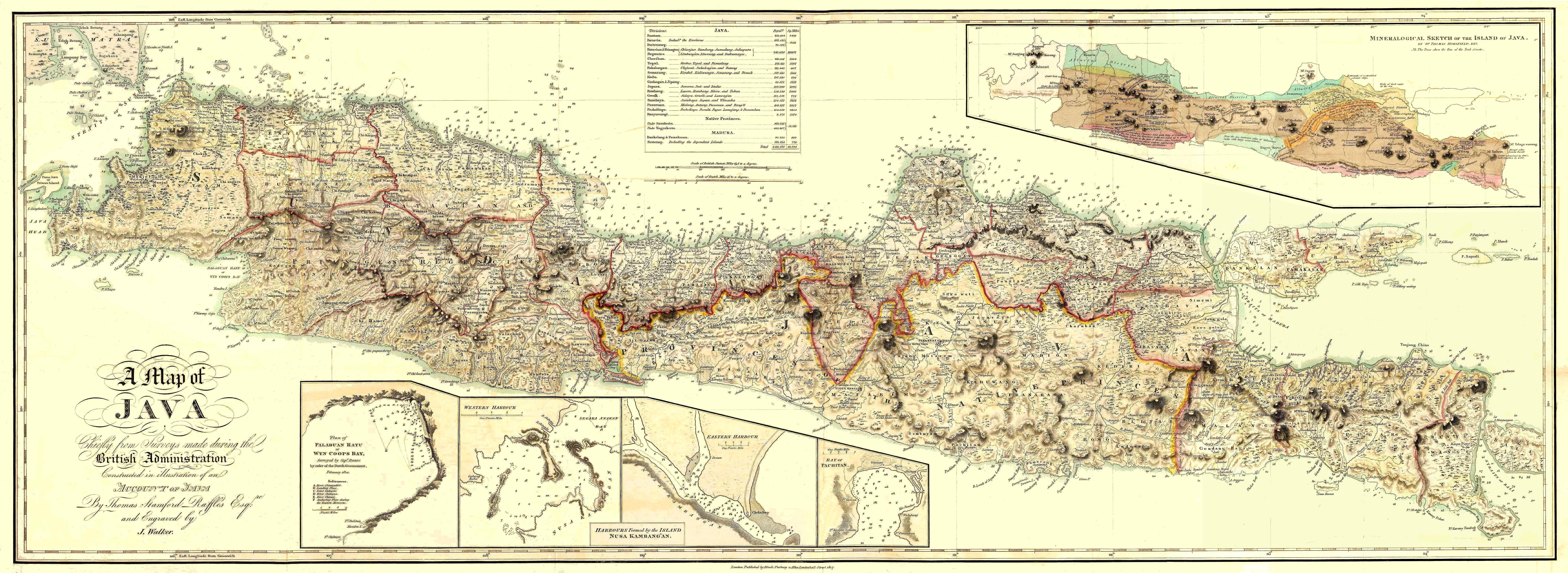
The map of Java in 1817, based on the account of Thomas Stamford Raffles in The History of Java.

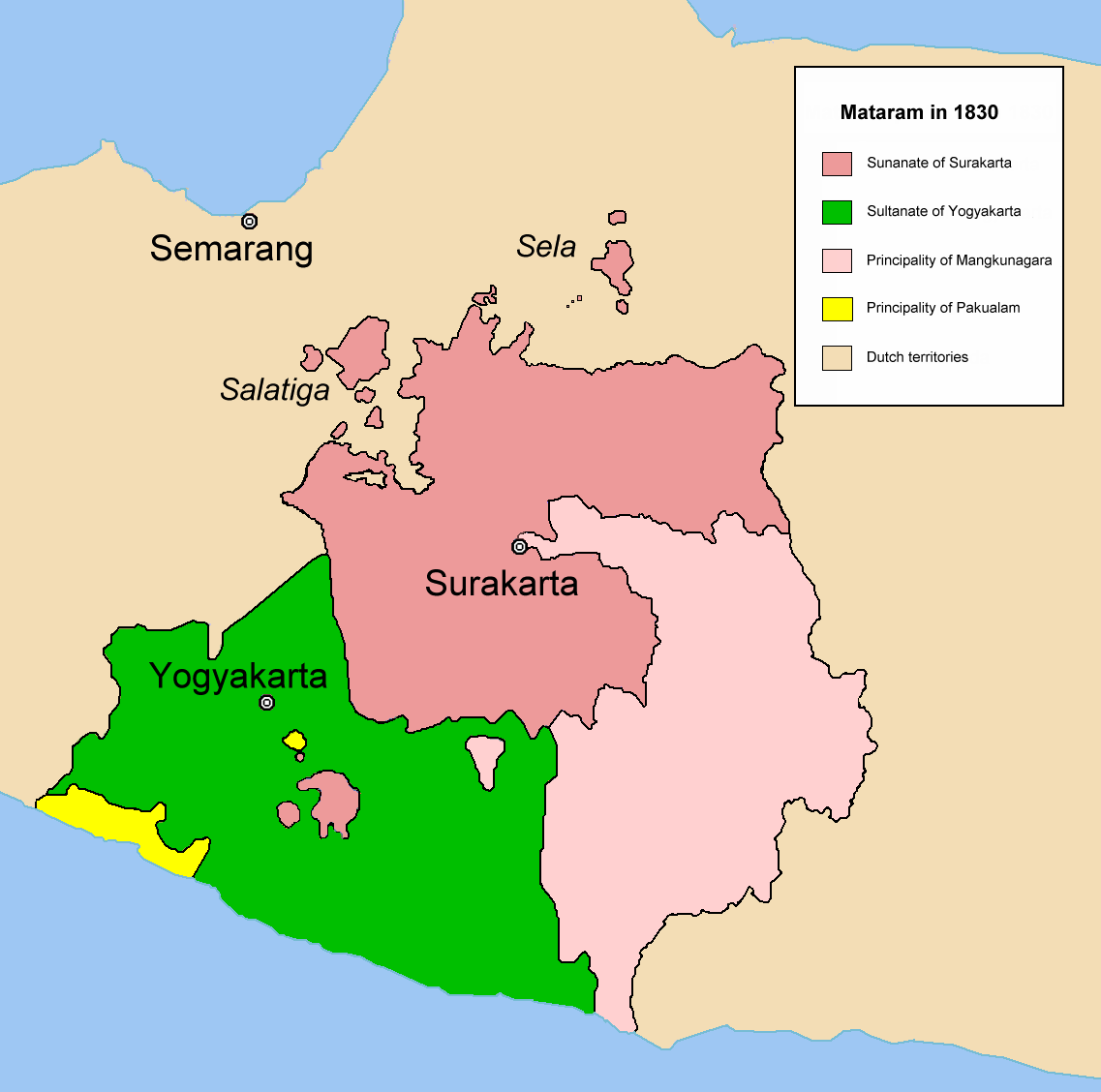
The divided Mataram in 1830, after the Java War.

The fall of Kartasura made the palace inauspicious for the king and Pakubuwana II built a new kraton in Surakarta or Solo and moved there in 1746. However, Pakubuwana II was far from secure in this throne. Raden Mas Said, or Pangeran Sambernyawa (meaning "Soul Reaper"), son of banished Arya Mangkunegara, who later would establish the princely house of Mangkunagara in Solo, and several other princes of the royal blood still maintained rebellion. Pakubuwana II declared that anyone who can suppress the rebellion in Sukawati, areas around present day Sragen, would be rewarded with 3000 households. Pangeran Mangkubumi, Pakuwana II's brother, who would later establish the royal house of Yogyakarta took the challenge and defeated Mas Said in 1746. But when he claimed his prize, his old enemy, patih Pringgalaya, advised the king against it. In the middle of this problem, the VOC's governor general, van Imhoff, paid a visit to the kraton, the first one to do so during the whole history of the relation between Mataram and the VOC, to confirm the de facto Dutch possession of coastal and several interior regions. Pakubuwana II hesitantly accepted the cession in lieu of 20,000 real per year. Mangkubumi was dissatisfied with his brother's decision to yield to van Imhoff's insistence, which was made without consulting the other members of royal family and great nobles. van Imhoff had neither experience nor tactfulness to understand the delicate situation in Mataram and he rebuked Mangkubumi as "too ambitious" before the whole court when Mangkubumi claimed the 3000 households. This shameful treatment from a foreigner who had wrested the most prosperous lands of Mataram from his weak brother led him to raise his followers into rebellion in May 1746, this time with the help of Mas Said.

In the midst of Mangkubumi rebellion in 1749, Pakubuwana II fell ill and called van Hohendorff, his trusted friend who saved his life during the fall of Kartasura in 1742. He asked Hohendorff to assume control over the kingdom. Hohendorff was naturally surprised and refused, thinking that he would be made king of Mataram, but when the king insisted on it, he asked his sick friend to confirm it in writing. On 11 December 1749, Pakubuwana II signed an agreement in which the "sovereignty" of Mataram was given to the VOC.

On 15 December 1749, Hohendorff announced the accession of Pakubuwana II's son as the new king of Mataram with the title Pakubuwana III. However, three days earlier, Mangkubumi in his stronghold in Yogyakarta also announced his accession with the title Mangkubumi, with Mas Said as his patih. This rebellion got stronger day by day and even in 1753 the Crown Prince of Surakarta joined the rebels. The VOC decided that it did have not the military capability to suppress this rebellion, though in 1752, Mas Said broke away from Hamengkubuwana. By 1754, all parties were tired of war and ready to negotiate.

The kingdom of Mataram was divided in 1755 under an agreement signed in Giyanti between the Dutch under the Governor General Nicolaas Hartingh and rebellious prince Mangkubumi. The treaty divided nominal control over central Java between the Yogyakarta Sultanate, under Mangkubumi, and Surakarta, under Pakubuwana. Mas Said, however, proved to be stronger than the combined forces of Solo, Yogya and the VOC. In 1756, he even almost captured Yogyakarta, but he realised that he could not defeat the three powers all by himself. In February 1757 he surrendered to Pakubuwana III and was given 4000 households, all taken from Pakubuwana III's own lungguh, and a parcel of land near Solo, the present day Mangkunegaran Palace, and the title of "Pangeran Arya Adipati Mangkunegara". This settlement proved successful in that political struggle was again confined to palace or inter-palace intrigues and peace was maintained until 1812.

== Demographics ==
Estimates of city populations within the realm of Mataram
City	Date	Estimate	Equivalent population
Demak	1512	8-10,000 houses (Pires 1515: 184) 30,000 fighting men (ibid.: 185)	58,500 120,000
Gresik	1512	6-7000 "men" (ibid.:194)	>25,000
Mataram	1624	200,000 fighting men (de Haen 1623:35)	800,000
Semarang	1654	100,000 (van Goens 1656: 205)	100,000
Japara	1654	100,000 (van Goens 1656: 268)	100,000
Tuban	1600	32-33,500 fighting men ("Tweede Boeck" 1601: 184)	130,000
Surabaya	1625	50-60,000 (VOC, in Meilink-Roelofsz 1962: 270)	>50,000

The paucity of reliable contemporary data makes precise estimates of population difficult. A royal census taken in 1651 records a total of 500,000 cacahs (taxable households). From this figure, Ricklefs estimates a maximum of three million Javanese around that time, further arguing that conventionalized local figures indicate a downward trend in population, beginning with a major decline reported in 1678 at the peak of the Trunajaya war and ending with a population boom in the peace following the division of the realm.

In the mid-seventeenth century, the royal capital of Mataram was one of the most populous cities in Southeast Asia, with an estimated population of 150,000-200,000 people. A Dutch observer in 1624 claimed the court city could muster 200,000 fighting men, which Reid uses to extrapolate a total population of ~800,000, though this might be an overestimation. The cities of the Pasisir, meanwhile, fluctuated rapidly in fortunes and therefore population over the course of the centuries. VOC estimates in the early seventeenth century yield a population of 130,000 and >50,000 for Tuban and Surabaya respectively, while the ports of Semarang and Jepara were reckoned at ~100,000 people. Nagtegaal gives a more modest estimate of 10,000-20,000, while Reid approximates a maximum population of 50,000 in the northern ports.

As for ethnic composition, the vast majority of the population living in the Javanese mainland were Javanese, but Ricklefs argues it would be a mistake to regard these peoples as possessing a strong homogenizing, unifying identity, as regional identities might have taken more prominence over "ethnic" ones. There were also Chinese to be found everywhere along the Pasisir and even in the interior, but in some of the smaller towns there were too few of them to form separate kampungs. Pekalongan, for instance, had only four Chinese before 1680. Malay, Makassarese, and Balinese immigrants settled chiefly in Jepara, Semarang, Gresik and cities of the Blambangan region where they made a living in various trades, such as commerce, mercenary work, and carpentry. The northern coasts also housed a fluctuating number of other minorities, including Madurese, Europeans, "Moors", Buginese, and others.

== Government and state ==
The Susuhunan's exercise of power was for the most part indirect, through the cooperation of lesser notables. The kingdom has been characterized by scholars as a "network state" based on complex personal structures between patrons and clients within various rungs of the court hierarchy. Especially where the administration of outlying provinces were concerned, there was as such minimal regularization across administrative offices and titles. The individual powers of officials and governors were dependent in part on their personal relationship with the Susuhunan or some other court dignitary. Some regents could claim to be the Susuhunan's equal in wealth and military might, while others were figures of little significance. Ricklefs argued that the inability of pre-Kartasura Mataram to undergo substantial institutionalisation and regularisation, despite attempts by some of its rulers, was rooted in Java's geographic, climatic and demographic circumstances. The realm was vast, but the population was scattered across pockets of population separated by wild jungle, mountain ranges and plateaus. There were rivers and well-constructed roads, as well as calm coastal waters, to facilitate easy communication between settlements; roads, however, were easily cut by volcanic eruptions and ruined by the monsoon rains, rivers could be too flooded or too low for safe travel, and monsoon rains could make coastal navigation treacherous.

=== Territorial division ===
The realm of Mataram was conventionally regarded in state chronicles not as a bounded state with fixed boundaries, but rather a series of concentric circles radiating outward from its centre, that being the capital city. These 'circles' may be enumerated, by proximity, as follows:

1. Negara: the capital city, in which the Susuhunan resides in his court (kraton)
2. Negaragung: the core territories immediately surrounding the court city; the Mataram region.
3. Mancanegara: the "foreign" or outer lands; in practice, the interior districts to the east of the court (Kediri, Madiun, Blora, Jipang)
4. Pasisir: the north coasts of Java, ranging from Cirebon to the Eastern Salient
5. Tanah Sabrang: "overseas", other islands and beyond; this may also include other places in Java outside the Javanese-speaking heartland, such as Batavia.

=== Administration ===
Members of the royal family did not normally hold administrative positions. They might at times be appointed supreme authority or viceroy of a region, but the tedium of day-to-day administration was usually delegated to the priyayi, an official class of professional bureaucrats who were nonetheless bound to the aristocratic class by intermarriage and links of economic advantage. The sovereign's family and their courtiers received for their maintenance royal apanages (lungguh) derived from the revenues of lands in the Negaragung, whose sizes corresponded with the rank of the holder in the hierarchy of the court. These lands were administered, and taxes collected, by officials appointed by the landholder. When the landholder passed, these apanage fields were reverted to the Crown to be handed out again. In the Mancanegara and the Pasisir, more patrimonial structures prevailed, where regents of independent stature held office. Regional dynasties sometimes of ancient origins still held sway; between 1680 and 1740, an average of 54% of eastern coastal regencies were ruled by governors of local origin.

In the pre-Kartasura period there existed the office of the Tumenggung of Mataram, who may be identified as the prime minister of the state equivalent to the Patih of pre-Islamic times. The office of Patih in fact returned from the Kartasura period onwards, at times held by more than one person, who presided over various provisional structures for the administration of the kingdom's provinces. Finances were handled by two treasurers, the wedana gedong kiwa (roughly, Treasurer of the Left) and the wedana gedong tengen (Treasurer of the Right). Matters of law and justice were handled by the Jaksa Agung (Supreme Judge), though the dispensal of capital punishment was normally the sole prerogative of the Susuhunan. There were in addition innumerable other titles and offices, whose functions were probably less regularised than was later the case in the post-Giyanti period: mantris, lurahs, umbuls, patinggis, tumenggungs, ngabehis, and so on.

==== The Pasisir ====
The Pasisir presented a special case, as its geographic and cultural separation from the inland centre inhibited the court's ability to effectively control its commercial wealth. Mataram rule was far from inviolable there, and the more established dynasties of the coasts more or less regarded themselves as under permanent occupation by the "upstart" dynasty. Susuhunan Amangkurat I experimented with a series of administrative systems, with varying levels of success, to govern this lucrative region. Early in his reign (~1651-1657) the Susuhunan appointed supervisors (tugur) as his representatives on the coasts, acting as a check against local authority. Complaints by the common people on the unsavoury governance of these tugurs compelled the Susuhunan to transform the system. This time the Pasisir was divided between four supreme governors (Tumenggung), who were in theory equal in status. Alarmed at their growing authority, the Susuhunan aimed at a separation of powers by narrowing their jurisdiction to military and judicial functions, while entrusting fiscal and commercial responsibilities to other officials. By the 1670s, the provincial regents (umbuls) backed by courtly patrons rose supreme, further curtailing the authority of the governors.

The situation, however, was far more fluid and complex, variable to political currents and the material realities in individual ports. Susuhunan Amangkurat II would later appoint only one head, a bupati for each district, thus taking another step towards the kabupaten system the Dutch (and, thereby, the Republic of Indonesia) would later inherit for their colonial empire. Each port of the pasisir usually had two syahbandars, one responsible for native traders and another for foreigners. The former office was correspondingly occupied by Javanese, and the latter usually by Chinese. The Syahbandariat offices tended to be farmed to the highest bidder, sometimes by the court and sometimes by the coastal governors. The Kartasura period saw a strengthening in the bupati class, and the associated incomes from these offices first went towards them, and only thereafter to the court.

=== The ideals of Javanese kingship ===
Javanese courtly chronicles and Orientalist scholarship emphasize the doctrine of the sacredness of the ruler as the cosmic centre of the kingdom and, indeed, the universe: as a semi-divine being (devaraja) in pre-Islamic times and the 'shadow of God on Earth' thereafter. This model of Javanese kingship has been criticized by modern scholars as assuming a static, changeless society, thereby lacking chronological specificity. Public acceptance of this doctrine, furthermore, does not necessarily mean acquiescence to the sovereign, as the idea of legitimacy rooted in divine sacredness need not imply it is in the possession of the present ruler. It is entirely possible for someone independent of the ruling dynasty to possess this 'divine' quality, just as it is possible for a ruler who possessed it to suddenly lose it for various reasons. Alternate channels of power did exist. Raden Trunajaya, for instance, challenged the legitimacy of the Mataram dynasty as descended from the "blood of farmers", as opposed to his own claims of descent from the Majapahit imperial house. He also refused to recognize the Susuhunan on the grounds of him not being a Sultan. The Pangeran of Giri rallied followers under the prophecy that Mataram was surely to fall if it continued to dally with the "infidels" of the VOC. Ricklefs contends that the Susuhunan's imperial authority resided in his capacity to "persuade, cajole, threaten or compel other powerful men with more direct control of resources until he achieved a consensus of notables in his favour".

== Military ==
=== Military technology ===
Military technology was one of the most developed branches of industry in Java. Chinese cannons were introduced to the island by the Mongol invasion of 1293. Rudimentary gunpowder technologies continued to spread through the island across the fourteenth and fifteenth centuries. The expeditions of Zheng He, for instance, left behind an extant Chinese bombard dated 1421. This period saw a flourishing in local innovations and adaptations, such as the early cetbang, the Java arquebus and the Istinggar. Following their conquest of Melaka, the Portuguese reported that "the gun founders were as good as those in Germany" and that the Jepara fleet which later attacked Melaka in 1513 was armed with cannons cast in Java. Portuguese techniques of gunpowder manufacturing were introduced by at least the 1620s, and Mataram was recorded to manufacture its own gunpowder thereafter, though scholars contend that the Javanese have manufactured their own gunpowder since long before. Reid calls Aceh and Mataram two of Southeast Asia's most powerful "gunpowder empires".

Mataram used and manufactured its own matchlock muskets. Rijckloff van Goens describes, while visiting the royal court's gun foundry, the laborious procedure followed by the Javanese artisans: iron cannon and musket barrels were forged around an iron core which must afterwards be withdrawn with great difficulty, upon which the hole was bored out to its desired calibre using a steel bit of square cross-section. Nonetheless, van Goens was impressed by the muskets and gunpowder. The year later he reported that within the space of three months, the Susuhunan's artisans had produced 800 muskets and many iron cannons. With greater intercourse in the subsequent decades between Mataram and the various European nations, Javanese gun-casting techniques improved. Decades later, many of the pieces defending VOC forts in the Pasisir belonged to the Susuhunan, and the VOC was unable to determine which were his and its own.

Until the early nineteenth century, there appeared to have been no significant difference between European and Javanese military technology, chiefly because the Javanese quickly adopted those few technical innovations which the VOC brought from Europe. Ricklefs notes that the transfer of military technology from the European to the Javanese side was "virtually immediate", contrasting this with the slower case of the Mughals and Tokugawa Japan. The Trunajaya war in the late 1670s set off decades of near-continuous warfare where the VOC were often partisans of the various factions contending for the throne. During this period, many innovations in infantry armaments were introduced to Java, including the snaphaen (snaphance), flintlocks, pre-packaged paper cartridges, handheld Coehoorn mortars and bayonets.

== Culture ==
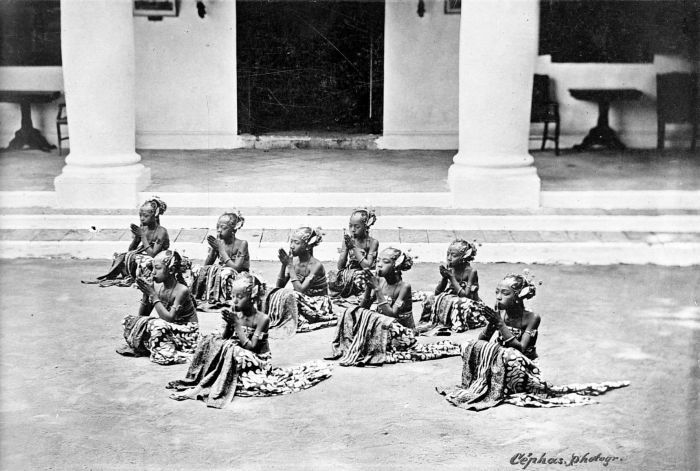
Serimpi dance, many of traditional Javanese courtly artforms and dances found today in Keratons, were developed during Mataram era.

Despite being an Islamic Sultanate, Mataram had never adopted Islamic culture, systems and institutions thoroughly. Its political system was more like a syncretism of earlier Javanese Hindu civilisation merged with Islamic elements. The major formation took place during Sultan Agung's reign as he adapted Islam to the Hindu-Javanese tradition and introduced a new calendar in 1633 based on Islamic and Javanese practice. The arts during Sultan Agung's reign were a mixture of Islamic and Hindu-Javanese elements. The mainstream belief system was the Kejawen tradition, while the Islamic beliefs was held by a handful of kiyai or ulama religious elite clustering around Kauman area near court's mosque. The Javanese court ceremonies, culture and rituals of Mataram still bears Hindu-Buddhist elements. Javanese cultural elements, such as gamelan, batik, kris, wayang kulit and Javanese dance were formulated, codified and took its present form during this period, and inherited by its successors, the courts of Surakarta and Yogyakarta, and the princedom of Mangkunegaran and Pakualaman. Islam is presented in Java adaptively to the original Javanese culture. This cultural adaptation was acceptable to the Javanese community, so the indigenousization of Islam was considered successful because Islam developed rapidly in Java naturally and through the cultural process of the Javanese community itself.

== List of Susuhunan (Kings) of Mataram ==
The kings of Mataram initially held the title panembahan and then the susuhunan, the title of sultan was only used in 1641-1645 during the reign of Anyokrokusumo.

1. Danang Sutawijaya (Panembahan Senopati) : 1586–1601
2. Raden Mas Jolang (Susuhunan Anyakrawati / Sunan Krapyak) : 1601–1613
3. Raden Mas Jatmika (Susuhunan Anyokrokusumo / Sultan Agung) : 1613–1645)
4. Raden Mas Sayyidin (Susuhunan Amangkurat I / Sunan Tegalarum) : 1646–1677
5. Raden Mas Rahmat (Susuhunan Amangkurat II / Sunan Amral) : 1677–1703
6. Raden Mas Sutikna (Susuhunan Amangkurat III / Sunan Mas) : 1703–1704
7. Raden Mas Darajat (Susuhunan Pakubuwono I / Sunan Ngalaga) : 1704–1719
8. Raden Mas Suryaputra (Susuhunan Amangkurat IV / Sunan Jawi) : 1719–1726
9. Raden Mas Prabasuyasa (Susuhunan Pakubuwono II / Sunan Kumbul) : 1726–1742
10. Raden Mas Garendi (Susuhunan Amangkurat V / Sunan Kuning) : 1742–1743
11. Raden Mas Prabasuyasa (Susuhunan Pakubuwono II / Sunan Kumbul) : 1743–1749

Mataram was divided in 1755, as a result of the Third Javanese War of Succession. The incident is referred to in Javanese as 'Palihan Nagari'.

== Legacy ==
The Mataram Sultanate was the last major native polity in Java prior the kingdom broke into of courts of Surakarta and Yogyakarta, and the princedom of Mangkunegaran and Pakualaman, and prior the island was completely ruled by the Dutch. For some Central Javanese, especially those hailed from Yogyakarta and Surakarta city, the Mataram Sultanate, especially Sultan Agung's era, was remembered with pride as a glorious past, as Mataram become the regional hegemon after Majapahit, almost completely unified Java island, and almost succeed to drive the Dutch out of Java. However, for those of former Mataram's rivals or vassals; East Javanese Surabayan, Madurese and Blambangan, also Priangan and Cirebon of West Java, Mataram era is remembered as the era of Central Javanese overlordship over them, marked with authoritarianism and arbitrariness of feudal Javanese regime. In the future this would lead to interregional Madura – Central Java animosity. Also to some degree, Priangan–Mataraman rivalry. Within Mataraman realm, the disintegration of the Mataram Sultanate into several competing Keratons, also would lead to Surakarta–Yogyakarta rivalry.

In art and culture, the Mataram Sultanate has left an everlasting mark in Javanese culture, as many of Javanese cultural elements, such as gamelan, batik, kris, wayang kulit and Javanese dance were formulated, codified and took its present form during this period, inherited and preserved diligently by its successor keratons. During the height of the Mataram Sultanate in the first half of the 17th century, Javanese culture expanded, much of Western and East Java region are being Javanized. Mataram's campaign on Eastern Javanese principalities such as Surabaya and Pasuruan expanded Mataraman influences on Java. Mataram expansion includes Sundanese principalities of Priangan highlands; from Galuh Ciamis, Sumedang, Bandung and Cianjur. It was during this period that Sundanese people were exposed and assimilated further into Javanese Kejawen culture. Wayang Golek are Sundanese taking on Javanese Wayang Kulit culture, similar shared culture such as gamelan and batik also flourished. It is probably during this times that Sundanese language began to adopt the stratified degree of term and vocabulary to denote politeness, as reflected in Javanese language. In addition, Javanese scripts also used to write Sundanese as cacarakan.

In political aspect, the incessant war of succession, treason, rebellion and court intrigue of Javanese Mataram keraton during the last period of its history, has made Mataram being remembered in quite unflattering way. Combined with Javanese behaviour, such as obsession with elegance and refinements (Javanese: alus), subtleness, politeness, courtesy, indirectness, emotional restraint and consciousness to one's social stature, has made Mataram politics quite complicated, intricate and deceitful. As the result the negative aspects of Javanisation of contemporary Indonesian politics, such as dishonesty, deceptive, treacherousness, rigidity of social hierarchy, authoritarianism and arbitrariness, accompanied by fondness of status display and arrogance, is often attributed to and called as "Mataramization". A typical negative description of priyayi behaving like the member of Javanese upper class.

== Catur Sagotra ==
Catur Sagotra means four entities that still have a single root kinship, referring to the royal families who succeeded the Islamic Mataram dynasty. These kingdoms are Kasunanan Surakarta, Kasultanan Yogyakarta, Kadipaten Mangkunagaran, and Kadipaten Pakualaman.

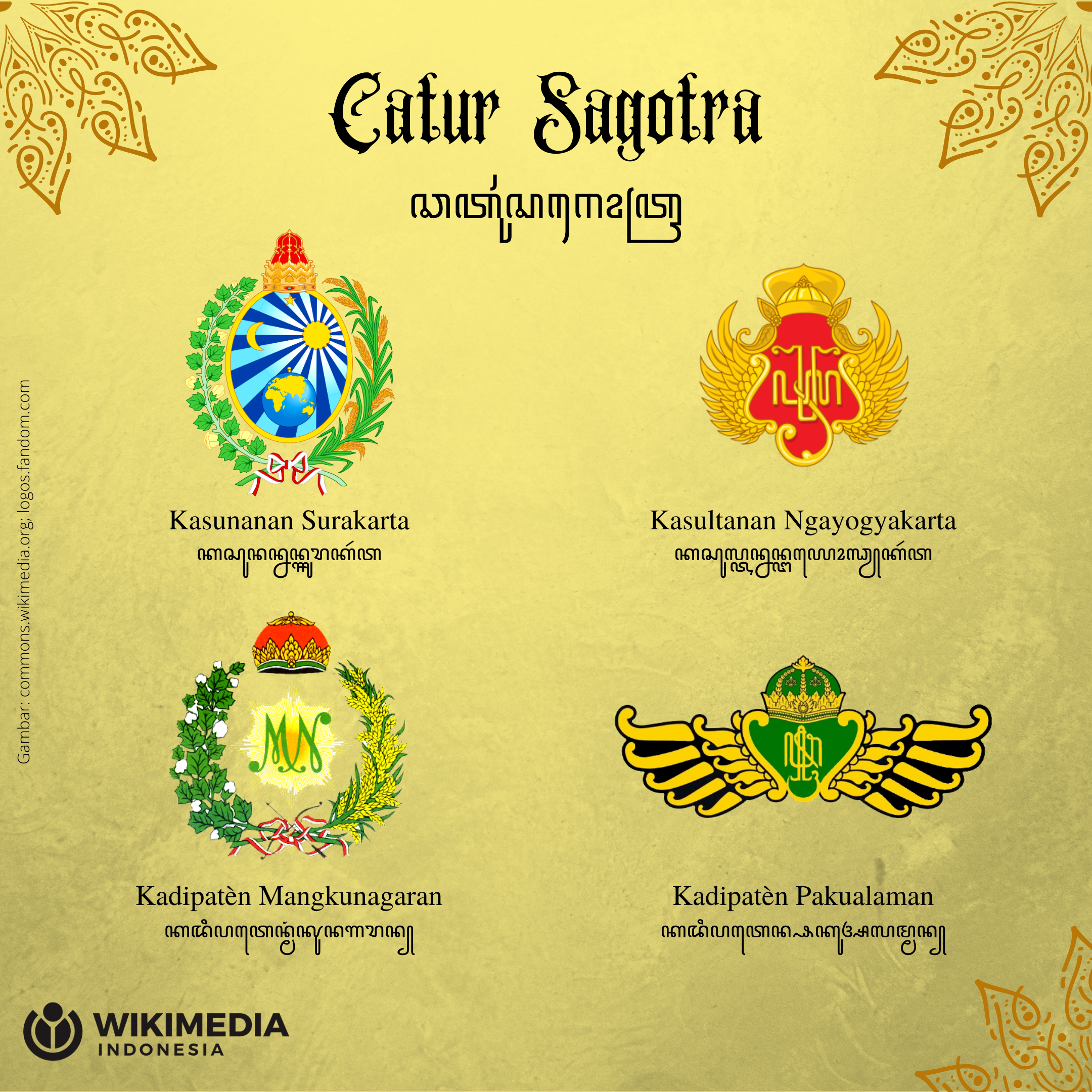
Catur Sagotra

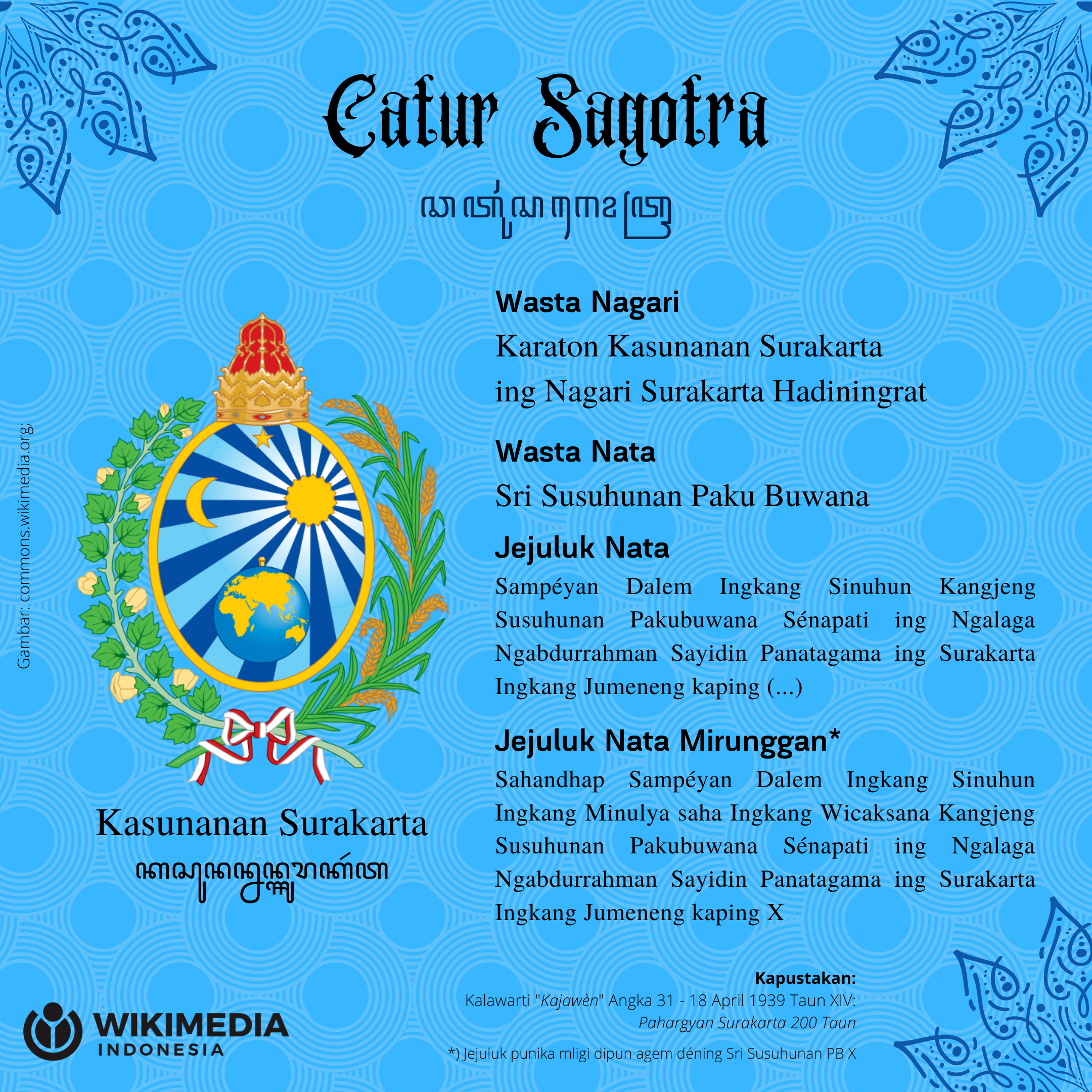
Surakarta Sunanate

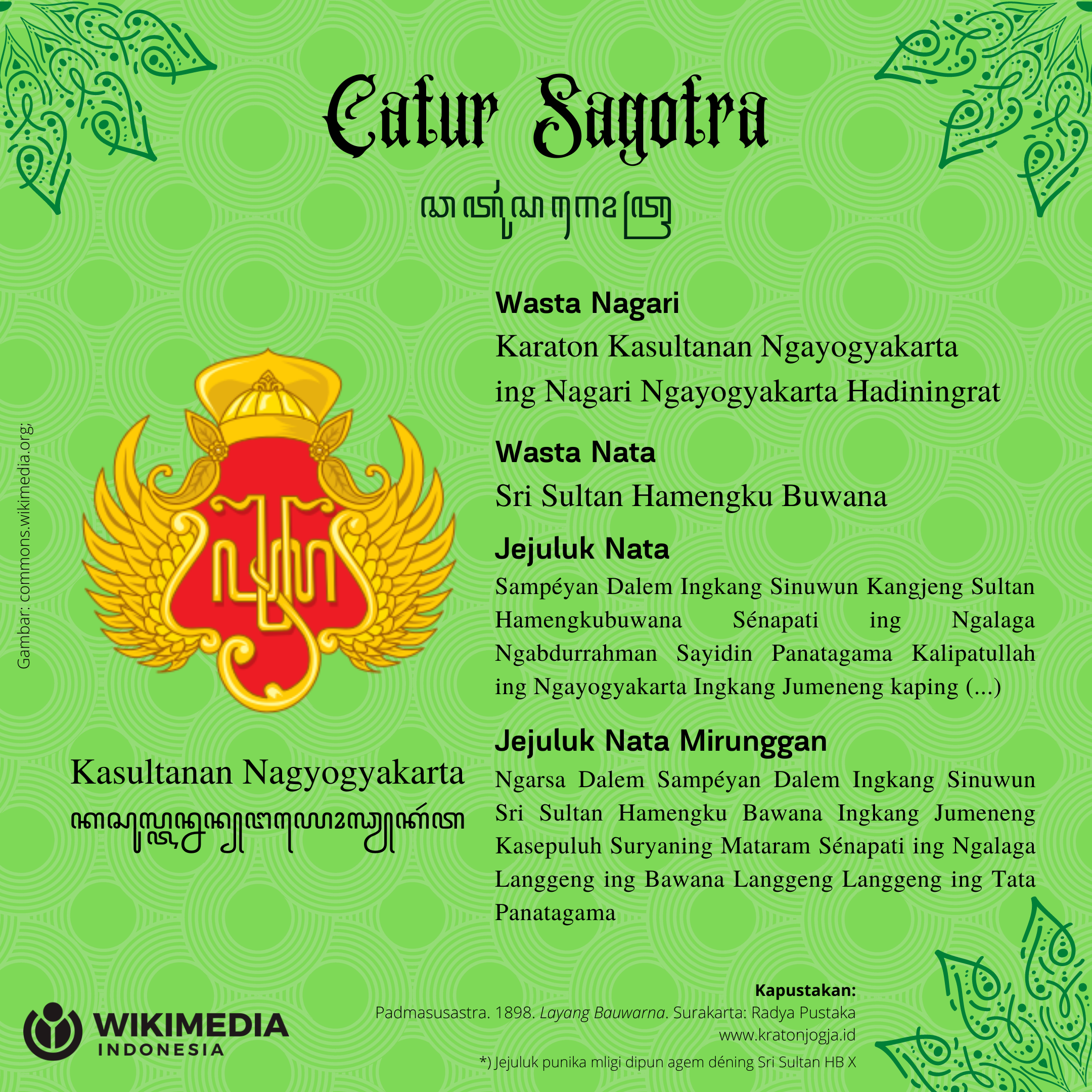
Yogyakarta Sultanate

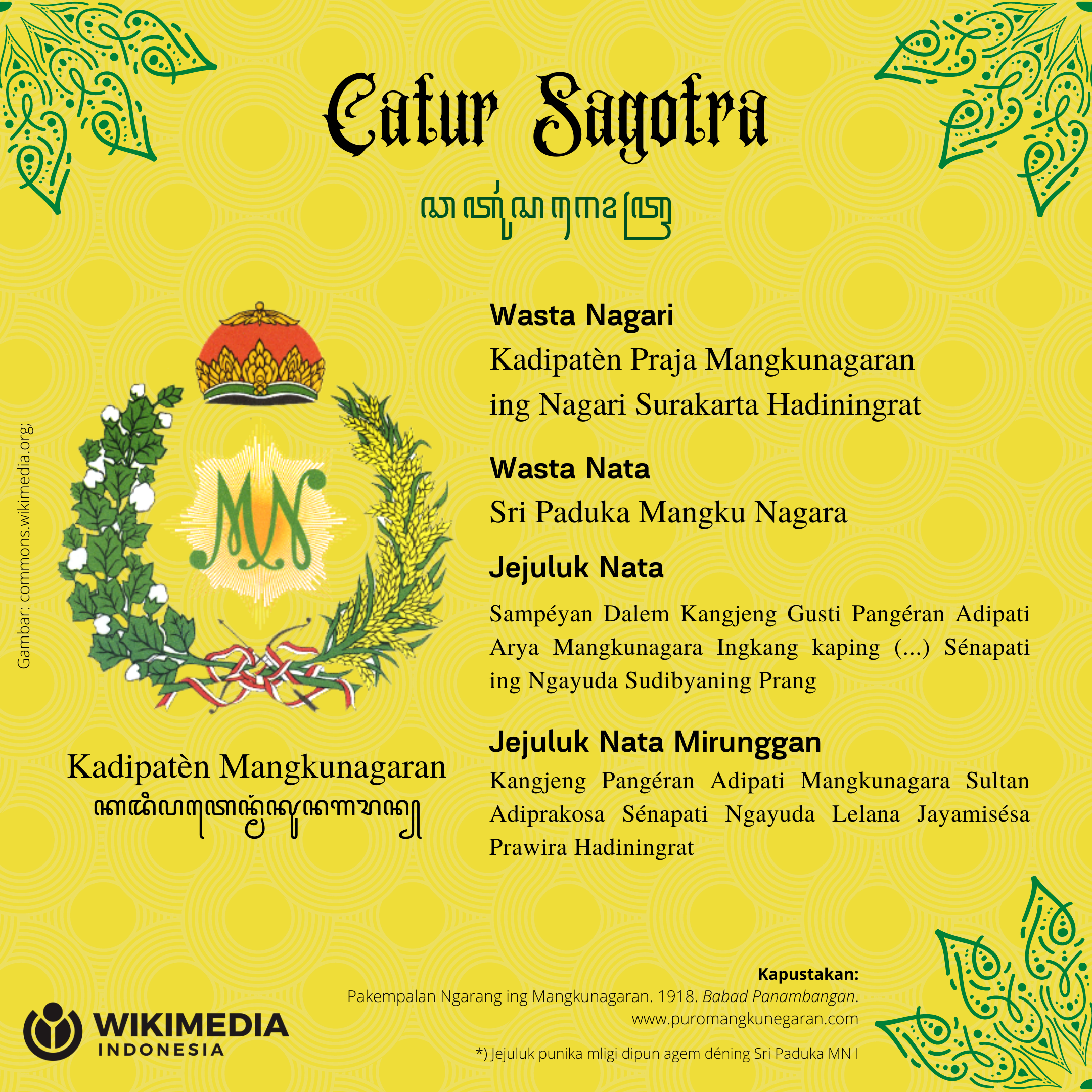
Grand Duchy of Mangkunagaran Surakarta

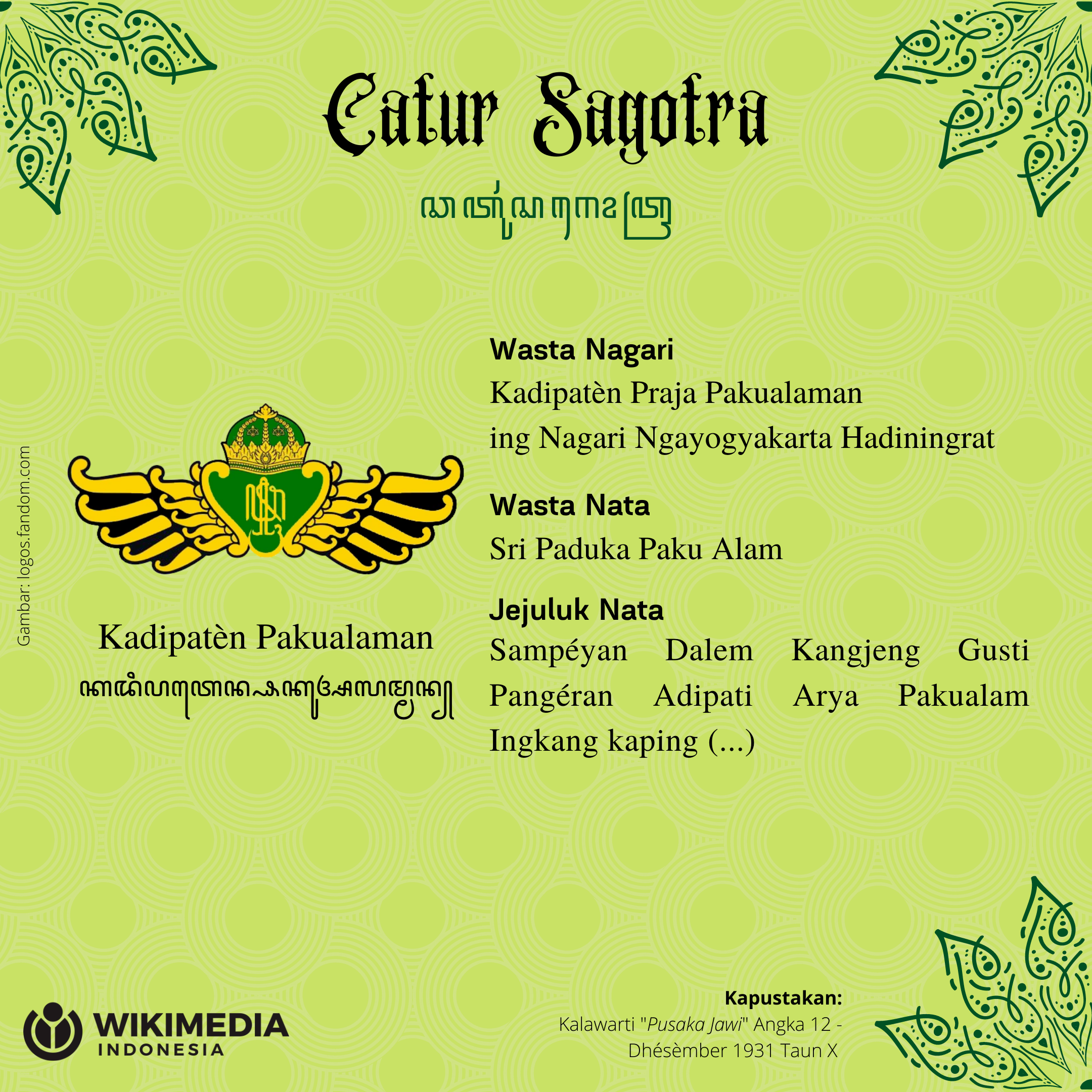
Grand Duchy of Pakualaman Yogyakarta

The formation of Catur Sagotra began in 2004. King of Surakarta Sri Susuhunan Paku Buwono XII (before he died) once gave the mandate to Mrs. Nani Soedarsono to continue the noble ideals of Catur Sagotra. Catur Sagotra is a joint idea of the four Javanese kings at that time, namely Sri Susuhunan Paku Buwono XII, Sri Sultan Hamengku Buwono IX, Sri Paku Alam VIII and Sri Mangku Nagoro VIII. The purpose of Catur Sagotra is to unite the four breeds in the bonds of the same cultural philosophy and historical linkages of Mataram's ancestors.

== See also ==
- List of Sunni Muslim dynasties
- List of monarchs of Java
