= Third Javanese War of Succession =

1749–1757 armed conflict in Java

- Part of Javanese Wars of Succession
Date	15 December 1749 – February 1757 (7 years and 2 months)
Location	Mataram Sultanate
Result	Treaty of Giyanti (Palihan Nagari)
Territorial changes	Dissolution of the Mataram Sultanate; Division of Mataram in 3 independent states called Surakarta Sunanate, Yogyakarta Sultanate and Mangkunegaran Palace

Belligerents
Mataram Sultanate (Note: until 1755); Dutch East India Company; Yogyakarta Sultanate (Note: from 1755); Surakarta Sunanate (Note: from 1755)	Anti-Dutch rebels

Commanders and leaders
Pakubuwana III; Nicolaas Hartingh; Hamengkubuwono I (Note: from 1755)	Prince Mangkubumi (Note: until 1755); Raden Mas Said (surrendered)

Strength
Unknown	Unknown

Casualties and losses
Unknown	Unknown

The Third Javanese War of Succession was an armed conflict from 1749 to 1757 on the island of Java. It led to the partition of the Mataram Sultanate into two and later three nominally independent 'Princely States': Surakarta, Yogyakarta and Mangkunegara.

== Cause ==
One of the causes of the war was Governor-General van Imhoff's humiliation of Prince Mangkubumi, the younger brother of Pakubuwana II of Surakarta's, by demanding the lease of the Javanese northern coast for an annual payment of 20,000 reales. Van Imhoff and Patih Pringgalaya then persuaded Pakubuwana II to cancel the grant of a fief in Sukawati (now Sragen) which had been promised to Mangkubumi as a reward for defeating Raden Mas Said's rebellion there in 1746. In response, Mangkubumi left Surakarta and rose up against the Dutch East India Company and Pakubuwana II joined forces with his nephew and former enemy, Raden Mas Said.

== War and settlement ==
In the midst of the Mangkubumi rebellion in 1749, Pakubuwana II fell ill and asked Johan Andries, Baron van Hohendorff to assume control over the kingdom. Van Hohendorff requested written confirmation. On 11 December 1749, Pakubuwana II signed an agreement in which the "sovereignty" of Mataram was given to the Dutch East India Company. They installed a powerless puppet, Pakubuwana III, on the throne. Mangkubumi, who considered himself to be the rightful heir to the throne, demanded the title of ruler. The people of Mataram, who called him Hamengkubuwono, regarded him as the true ruler of Mataram.

After years of battles including at Grobogan and Demak, the Dutch under de Clerck suffered a crushing defeat at the Bogowonto River. Governor-General Mossel entered peace negotiations with Hamengkubuwono. Eventually in 1755 the Treaty of Giyanti was concluded, named after the place east of Surakarta where the negotiations took place. The Kingdom of Mataram was divided between the two warring parties. The old capital of Kartasura, which after years of fratricidal war had come to be thought of as doom-laden, was abandoned. Pakubuwana III became ruler of the eastern part of Mataram [(Kasoenanan Solo or Surakarta) (1750–1788)], and built a new kraton in Surakarta. Hamengkubuwono became Sultan Hamengkubuwono I, reigning over the western half of Mataram, and north of Kartasura built his new kraton at Yogyakarta (Kasultanan Yogyakarta) (1755–1792). He also gave Mas Said a south-eastern part of Mataram as the 'princely state' of Mangkunegara (1757–1796), where he ruled as Mangkunegara I and built his own kraton near Surakarta.
