= Nicolaas Hartingh =

Dutch colonial administrator (1718 – 1766)

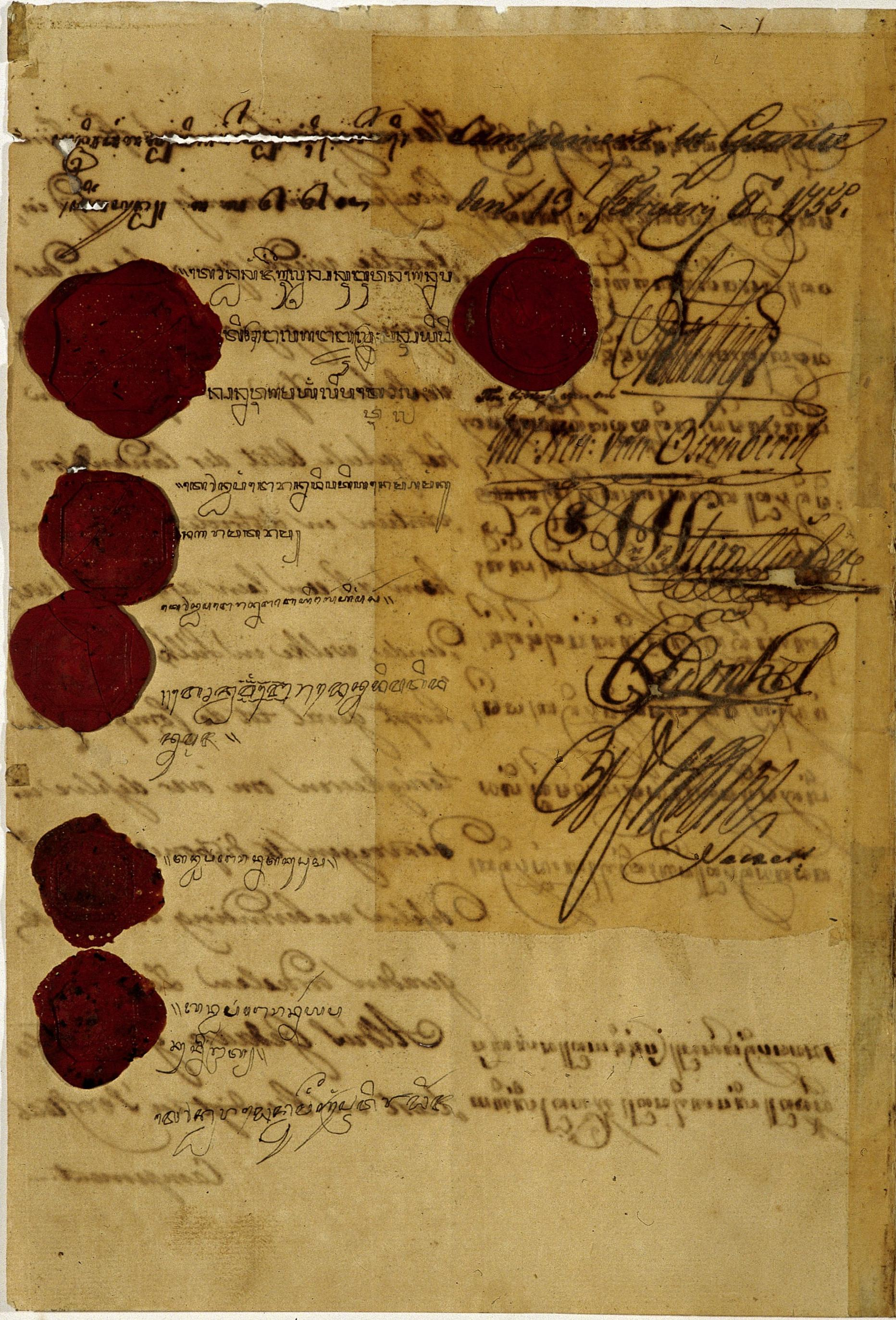
Nicolaas Hartingh's signature appears next to the seal on the right hand side of this page of the Treaty of Giyanti.

Nicolaas Hartingh (Amsterdam, 1718 – Batavia, 25 December 1766), was a Dutch colonial administrator for the Dutch East India Company (VOC). He served as Governor and Director of the northeast coast of Java from 1754 to 1761 and was appointed Full Counsellor of the Indies to the Vice-Roy's Council in 1765.

== Family ==
Hartingh was born in Amsterdam and baptised there on 9 August 1718. His father was Marten Hartingh (1690–1755) and his mother was Amerentia Silver (1691–1761). Marten Hartingh sailed out to the Dutch East Indies as commander with the return fleet in 1726.

Nicolaas Hartingh married three times. With his first wife, Dorothea Weber (died 1745), he had one son, Marten (born 1743). In 1747 he married Giliana Wilhelmina Hilgers (1721–1754), with whom he had two sons, Maurits Anthonius (born 1748) and Nicolaas (born 1753), and two daughters Amerentia Maria and Jacoba Wilhelmina (both born 1750). In 1762 he married Philippina Theodora Mossel, with whom he had two children who died young.

== Career ==
In 1734 at the age of 16 years Nicolaas Hartingh entered into the service of the Dutch East India Company and spent his early years in their employment learning the Javanese language. From Tegal he was sent to Kartasura to be trained as interpreter and eventually worked in this capacity for the company in Semarang and later in Surabaya where he was also appointed as secretary. In Surabaya he was held in high esteem by the ruling prince Cakraningrat of Madura. Through his skilled use of language, he placated the prince when relations between the prince and the company threatened to fray in 1746. For this, he was promoted to junior merchant and appointed as Commissioner of the new Grissee (Gresik) Residency by Governor-General Van Imhoff.

By 1748 Hartingh was promoted to merchant, and in 1750 to senior merchant, delegated to and over native affairs. In Match 1754 he became the company's Governor and Director of the northeast coast of Java. Sources note Hartingh's sincerity, endearing manor and excellent use of the local languages, which led to him being well regarded by the local population. He was able to understand their disposition and statesmanship, which proved handy in his diplomatic endeavours. Governor Hartingh's leadership brought about a change in approach in the region. Rather than by military force and bloodshed, he believed in achieving the objectives of his employer, the company, through diplomacy and negotiation.

=== Role in the Treaty of Giyanti ===
The Treaty of Giyanti was the crowning achievement of the career of Nicolaas Hartingh and a testament to his skills of diplomacy. By the mid-eighteenth century, the Sultanate of Mataram was gripped in an internal power struggle, referred to as the Third Javanese War of Succession. The position of the ruler of the sultanate, Susuhunan Pukubuwono II and his successor Susuhunan Pukubuwono III, had become weakened and this to some extent to allowed for interference by the Dutch East India Company in the affairs of the empire. In contrast, Mataram princes like Mangkubumi (who did not regard Pukubuwono III as the rightful heir) and Sambernyawa (or Raden Mas Saïd) opposed the company's interference and growing power in the region and sought to diminish this by launching military campaigns against the company, their nephew Pukubuwono III and each other. In these tense circumstances, Governor Hartingh came to the conclusion that the only way of resolving this problem was by negotiating with Prince Mangkubumi and offering a path to peace.

In September 1754, Hartingh and Mangkubumi reached an agreement, the contents of which was subsequently conveyed to the Governor-General and Pakubuwono III. In November 1754 agreement was also reached with Pakubuwono III. The points of the agreement were then outlined in the text of the Treaty of Giyanti that was signed on 13 February 1755 by Governor Hartingh as Commissioner Plenipotentiary of the Dutch East India Company, Prince Mangkubumi and Susuhan Pukubuwono III along with his allies. With the signing of the agreement, the Mataram Empire came to and end and its lands were divided between Mangkubumi and Pakubuwono III.

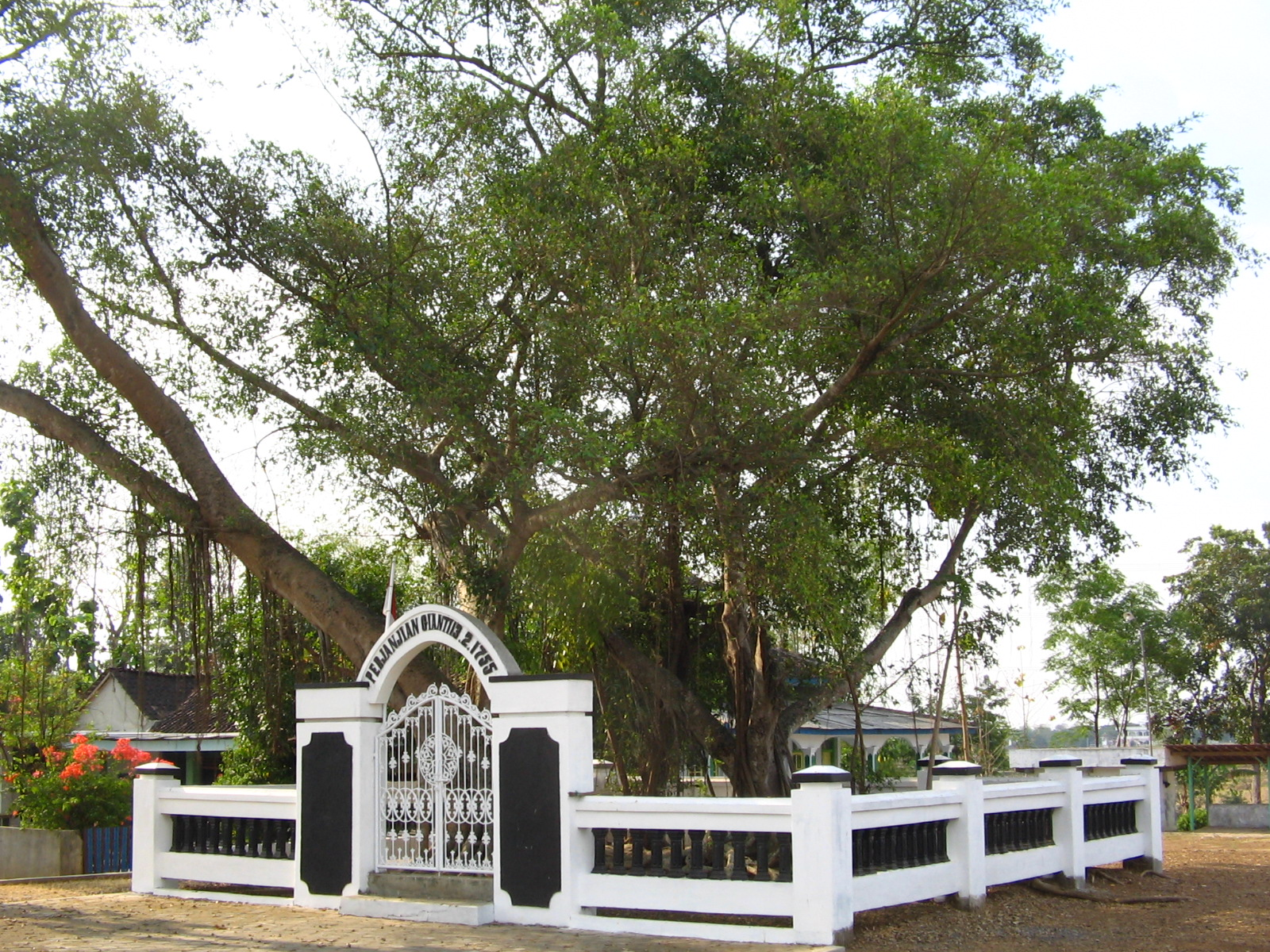
Location of the signing of the Treaty of Giyanti on 13 February 1755.

Through negotiating the division of the once powerful Mataram Sultanate, Hartingh played a crucial role in the creation of the Sultanate of Yogyakarta of Mangkubumi. Susuhunan Pakubuwono III subsequently ruled over the Surakarta Sunanate. Governor Hartingh represented the Dutch East India Company at the investiture of Prince Mangkubumi as Sri Sultan Hamengkubuwono I of Yogyakarta in March 1755. For his role in establishing peace between Pakubuwono III and Mangkubumi, Hartingh won high praise from his superiors, including the Heeren XVII.

In the ensuing two years, the region was still plagued by hostilities between Prince Sambernyawa (Raden Mas Said) and Pakubuwono III. Governor Hartingh again used his skills of diplomacy to bring an end to the hostilities known as the Third Javanese War of Succession, by convincing the Pakubuwono III to part with more of his territory, this time in favour of Raden Mas Saïd who was installed as Sri Mangkunegara I of the Princely State of Mangkunegaran in 1757. The Dutch now had a more peaceful region and all three rulers had to acknowledge Dutch suzerainty.

A detailed historical account of the military campaigns between 1741 and 1757 was penned (most likely by Hartingh) as "Kort verhaal van de Javasche oorlogen". In this work, Nicolaas Hartingh reflected critically on the events and lamented that the VOC would have been better off remaining a trading company, as in his view it had gained little from the vast treasures expended on these wars.

=== Retirement ===
After these successes, Governor Hartingh repeatedly requested to be allowed to return to Batavia. It was felt however that his presence was still needed in the barely peaceful area. Eventually, in 1761 Hartingh was allowed to retire as Governor and return to Batavia. There he was nominated in 1762 as President of the Heemraden and in 1765 he was appointed Full Counsellor of the Indies (Raad Ordinair van Indië) to the Vice-Roy's Council by the Heeren XVII.

At the time of his death in 1766, the 48-year-old Nicolaas Hartingh was a wealthy man. He was interred in the Dutch church in Batavia.
