= Treaty of Giyanti =

1755 agreement to divide the Javanese sultanate of Mataram

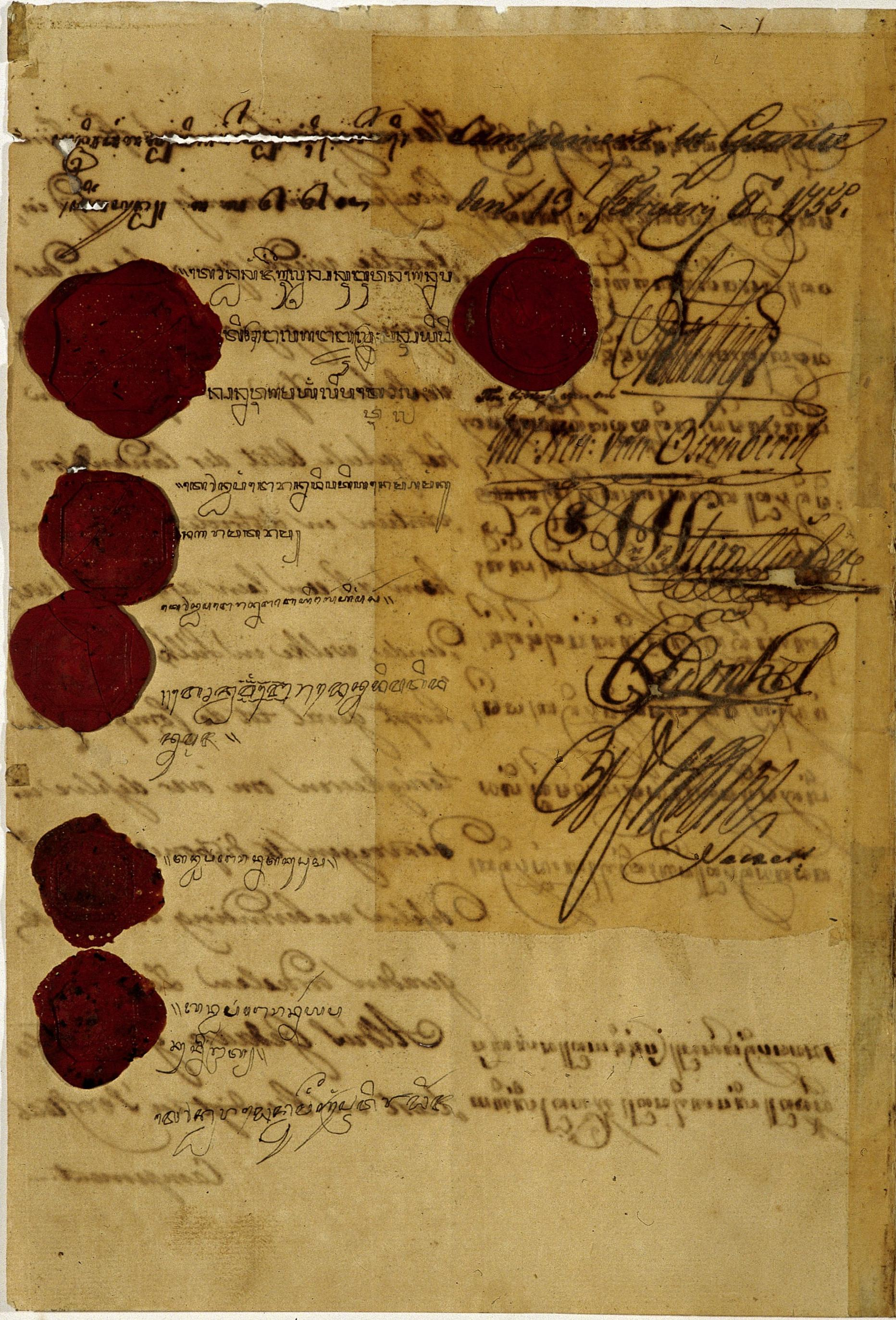
- The Giyanti Agreement text is signed and stamped by the parties involved.
- Signed: February 13, 1755
- Location: Hamlet Kerten, Jantiharjo Village, Karanganyar, Central Java
- Signatories: Mataram Sultanate; Pangeran Mangkubumi; Dutch East India Company
- Languages: Javanese and Dutch

The Treaty of Giyanti (also known as the Treaty of Gianti Java, the Gianti Agreement, or the Giyanti Treaty) was signed and ratified on February 13, 1755, between Prince Mangkubumi, the Dutch East India Company, and Sunan Pakubuwono III along with his allies. The accord officially divided the Sultanate of Mataram between Mangkubumi and Pakubuwono. The name "Giyanti" was taken from the location of the signing of the agreement, namely in Giyanti Village (Dutch spelling) which is now located in Hamlet Kerten, Jantiharjo Village, southeast of Karanganyar, Central Java.

== Background ==
The treaty was the main result of the Third Javanese War of Succession in 1749–57. Pakubuwono II, king of Mataram, had backed a Chinese rebellion against the Dutch. In 1743, in payment for his restoration to power, the King ceded the north coast of Java and Madura to the Dutch East India Company. Later, before he died in 1749, he ceded the remainder of the kingdom.

Pakubuwono III, who was supported by the company, became the new king, but he had to face a rival of his father, Raden Mas Said, who had occupied a region called Sukowati. In 1749 Mangkubumi, the brother of the late Pakubuwono II, dissatisfied with his inferior position, joined Raden Mas Said in the struggle against Pakubuwono III. The company sent troops to assist its vassal king, but the rebellion continued. Not until 1755 did Mangkubumi break away from Raden Mas Said and accept a peace offer at Gianti, by which Mataram was divided into two parts. Raden Mas Said signed a treaty with the company in 1757, which entitled him to have a part of eastern Mataram. He was thenceforth known as Mangkunegara I.

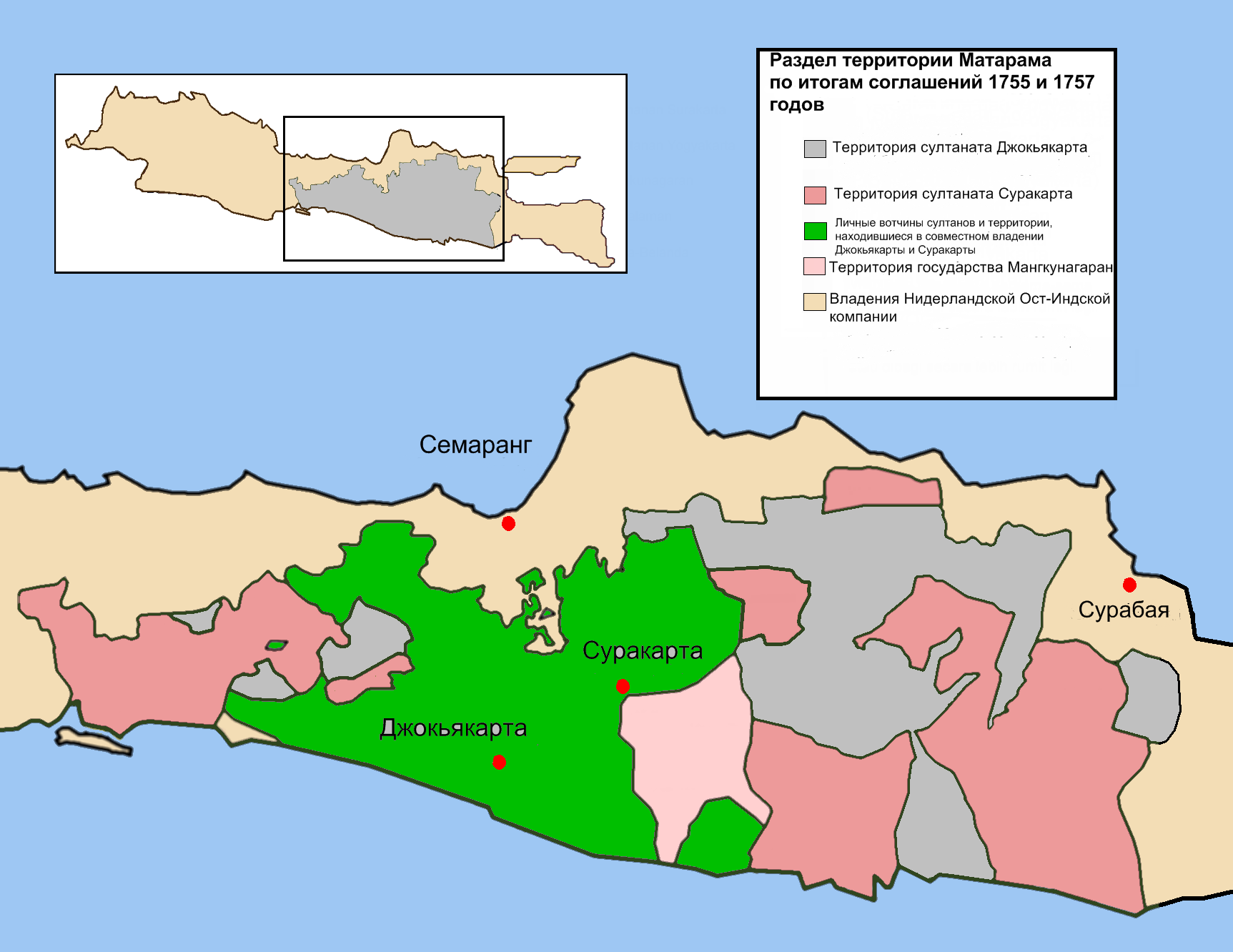
Map of former sultanate Mataram, 1757.

== Negotiations ==
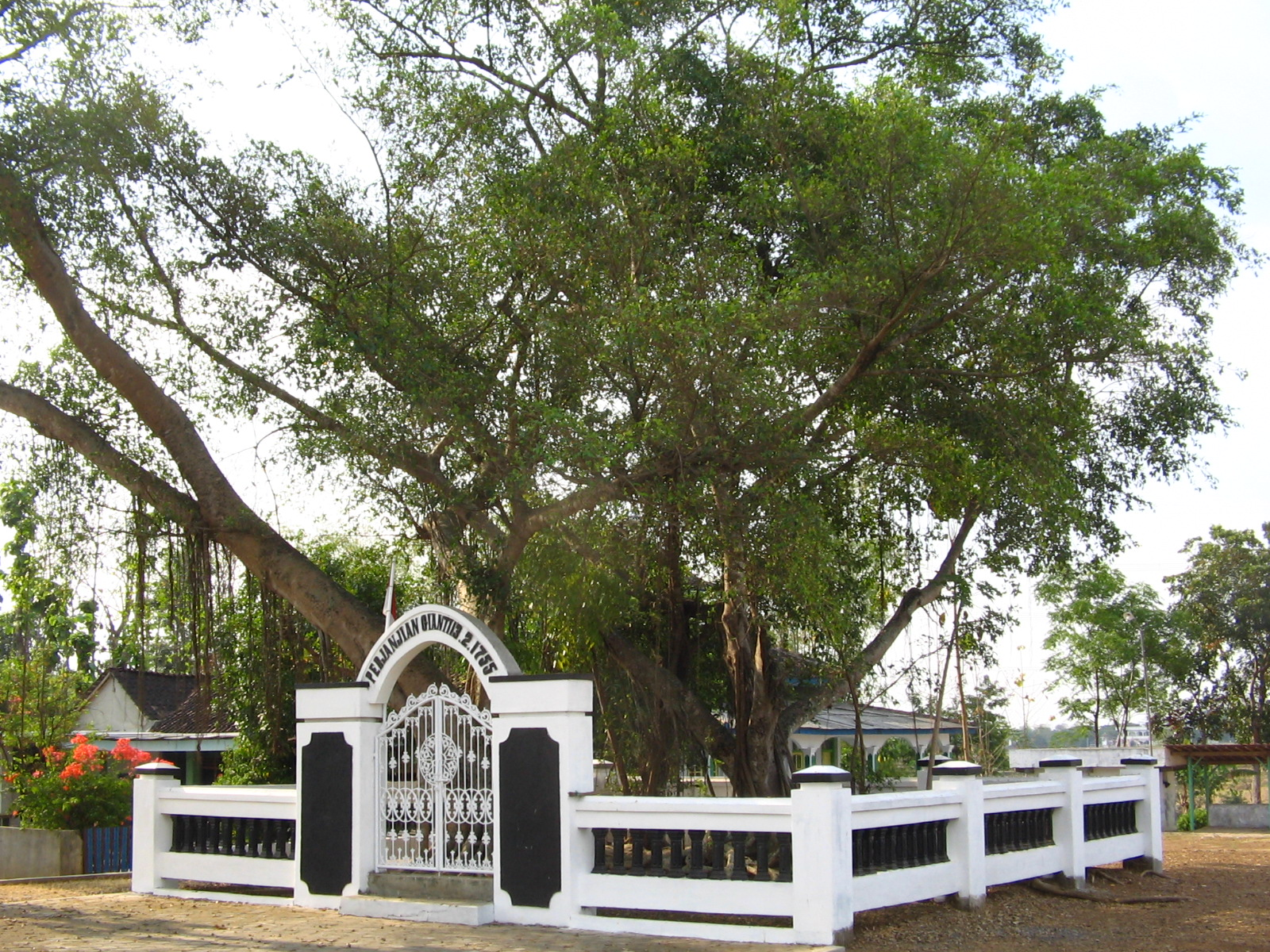
Location of the signing of the Giyanti Agreement in Karanganyar, Central Java.

According to the daily register documents of Nicolaas Hartingh, the then-Dutch East India Company Governor for North Java, he left Semarang to meet with Prince Mangkubumi on 10 September 1754. The actual meeting with Prince Mangkubumi was only held on September 22, 1754. The following day, closed-door negotiations were held and only a few people attended. Prince Mangkubumi was accompanied by Prince Natakusuma and Tumenggung Ronggo. Hartingh himself was accompanied by Hendrik Breton, Captain C. Donkel, and his secretary, Willem Fockens. The interpreter was Bastani.

In the first talks about the division of Mataram, Hartingh expressed reservations because he did not think there could be two leaders in one empire. Mangkubumi responded by saying that there was more than one sultan in Cirebon. The negotiations did not go smoothly due to the suspicion between the parties. Finally, after vowing not to break each other's promises, the negotiations picked up. Hartingh again suggested that Mangkubumi not use the Sunan title and determined which areas would be controlled by him. Mangkubumi objected to giving up the title of Sunan because the people had recognized him as Sunan five years earlier. Prince Mangkubumi was appointed as Sunan who was in charge of the Sultanate of Mataram when Pakubuwana II died in Kabanaran, at the same time the Dutch East India Company installed Duke Anom as Pakubuwana III.

The negotiations had to be stopped but continued the next day. On September 23, 1754, a memorandum of understanding was finally reached, which concluded that Prince Mangkubumi would use the title of sultan and obtain half of the empire. The north coast of Javam or the coastal areas which had been surrendered to the Dutch East India Company remained in the hands of the Dutch East India Company and half of the compensation for the control would be given to Mangkubumi. In addition, Mangkubumi would also get half of the palace heirlooms. The memorandum of understanding was then submitted to Pakubuwana III. On 4 November 1754, Pakubuwana III delivered a letter to the Governor-General of the Dutch East India Company, Jacob Mossel, regarding his agreement on the outcome of negotiations between the Governor of North Java, Hartingh, and Prince Mangkubumi.

Based on the negotiations carried out on September 22–23, 1754, and the approval letter of Pakubuwana III, the Agreement on February 13, 1755, was signed in Giyanti.

After the signing of the treaty, Mangkubumi took the title of Sultan Hamengkubuwono and set up his court in Yogyakarta, not far from Kotagede, now a suburb of the city, where the tomb of Senopati, the founder of Mataram, is located.

== Terms ==
Based on the terms of the agreement, the eastern half of the Sultanate of Mataram in central Java was given to Pakubuwono III with Surakarta as its capital, while the western half was given to Prince Mangkubumi with its capital in Yogyakarta. This treaty marked the division of the former territory of the Mataram Sultanate between the Surakarta Sunanate and Yogyakarta Sultanate.

After the signing of the treaty, Prince Mangkubumi changed his title as prince and became known as Sultan Hamengkubuwono I. The accord, however, did not end hostilities in the area since Prince Sambernyawa (or Raden Mas Said) continued to fight against Pakubuwono III. The division of Java was recorded in a series of Javanese texts altogether known as the Babad Giyanti or Babad Mankubunièn with the best known Babad Giyanti possibly having been composed by Yasadipura the Elder in the early 19th century.

== Articles of the Agreement ==
Soedarisman Poerwokoesoemo in his book, the Duchy of Pakualaman, writes the following:

1. Article 1 - The Prince of Mangkubumi was appointed Sultan Hamengkubuwana Senapati in Alaga Abdurrahman Sayyidin Panatagama Khalifatullah over half of the Mataram Sultanate conferred on him by inheritance to his heirs, in this case, the Duke of Anom Bendoro Raden Mas Sundoro.
2. Article 2 - There will always be cooperation between the people under the Dutch East India Company and the people of the Sultanate.
3. Article 3 - Before Dalem (Rijks-Bestuurder) and the regents begin their duties, they must take the oath of allegiance to the Dutch East India Company. Dalem is a day-to-day executive power executive with the approval of a resident or governor.
4. Article 4 - The Sultan shall not lift or dismiss the Dalem and Regent before obtaining approval from the Dutch East India Company.
5. Article 5 - Sri Sultan will pardon the Regent in favor of the Dutch East India Company in war.
6. Article 6 - The Sultan will not claim his rights over Madura Island and the coastal areas which have been handed over by Sri Sunan Pakubuwana II to the Dutch East India Company in his contract dated May 18, 1746. Instead, the Dutch East India Company will compensate the Sultan with 10,000 royalties annually.
7. Article 7 - The Sultan will assist Sri Sunan Pakubuwana III whenever necessary.
8. Article 8 - Sri Sultan promises to sell the Dutch East India Company ingredients at certain prices.
9. Article 9 - The Sultan promises to abide by all the agreements entered into between the previous Mataram rulers and the Dutch East India Company, in particular the treaties made in 1705, 1733, 1743, 1746, and 1749.
10. Article 10 - Termination of this Agreement from signed by N. Hartingh, W. van Ossenberch, J.J. Steenmulder, C. Donkel, and W. Fockens of the Dutch East India Company.

== See also ==
- List of treaties
