= François Tack =

Dutch officer (c. 1650 – 1686)

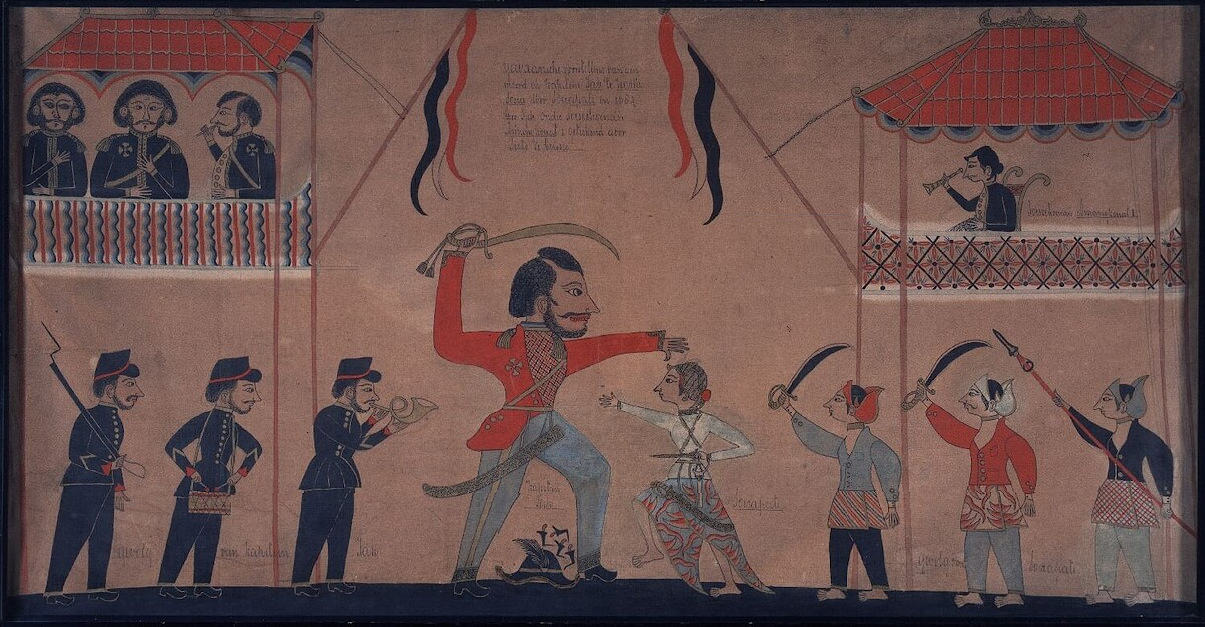
Tack's death at Kartasura

François Tack (c. 1650 – 8 February 1686) was a Dutch East India Company (VOC) officer. Ranked captain at the time of his death, he was one of the VOC's main commanders during the 1678 Kediri campaign against Trunajaya and participated in the city's assault. He was later killed during a brawl at the court of Mataram in Kartasura on 8 February 1686, where he was sent on a diplomatic mission to arrest Untung Surapati.

== See also ==
- Anthonio Hurdt, the overall VOC commander of the Kediri campaign.
- Isaac de Saint-Martin

== Bibliography ==
- Ricklefs, M.C. (1993). War, Culture and Economy in Java, 1677–1726: Asian and European Imperialism in the Early Kartasura Period. Sydney: Asian Studies Association of Australia. ISBN 978-1-86373-380-9.
- Ricklefs, M.C. (2008-09-11). A History of Modern Indonesia Since C.1200. Palgrave Macmillan. ISBN 978-1-137-05201-8.
- Pigeaud, Theodore Gauthier Thomas (1976). Islamic States in Java 1500–1700: Eight Dutch Books and Articles by Dr H.J. de Graaf. The Hague: Martinus Nijhoff. ISBN 90-247-1876-7.
