= John Carvile =

English lawyer and politician

John Carvile (born c 1564) was an English lawyer and politician who sat in the House of Commons from 1621 to 1626.

Carvile was the son of John Carvile of Berwick-upon-Tweed. He matriculated at Queen's College, Oxford on 31 May 1583, aged 18 and was awarded BA on 26 January 1587. He was called to the bar at Middle Temple in 1596. In 1621, he was elected Member of Parliament for Aldborough. He was re-elected MP for Aldborough in 1624, in 1625 and in 1626.

Parliament of England
Preceded by Sir Henry Savile; George Wetherid	Member of Parliament for Aldborough; 1621–1626; With: Christopher Wandesford 1621–1624; Richard Aldborough 1625–1626	Succeeded by Henry Darley; Robert Stapleton
