= Swale baronets =

Extinct baronetcy in the Baronetage of England

- Escutcheon of the Swale baronets of Swale Hall
- Creation date: 1660
- Status: extinct
- Extinction date: post 1740
- Motto: Jesu, esto mihi Jesus, Jesu, be Jesus unto me

The Swale Baronetcy, of Swale Hall in the County of York, was a title in the Baronetage of England. It was created on 21 June 1660 for Solomon Swale, Member of Parliament for Aldborough. The title became either extinct or dormant on the death of the fourth Baronet some time after 1741.

== Swale baronets, of Swale Hall (1660) ==
- Sir Solomon Swale, 1st Baronet (1610–1678)
- Sir Henry Swale, 2nd Baronet (c.1639–1683)
- Sir Solomon Swale, 3rd Baronet (c.1665–1733)
- Sir Sebastian Fabian Enrique Swale, 4th Baronet (died after 1741)
