= 1678 Kediri campaign =

Dutch-Mataram campaign in Java

Kediri campaign
- Part of the Trunajaya rebellion
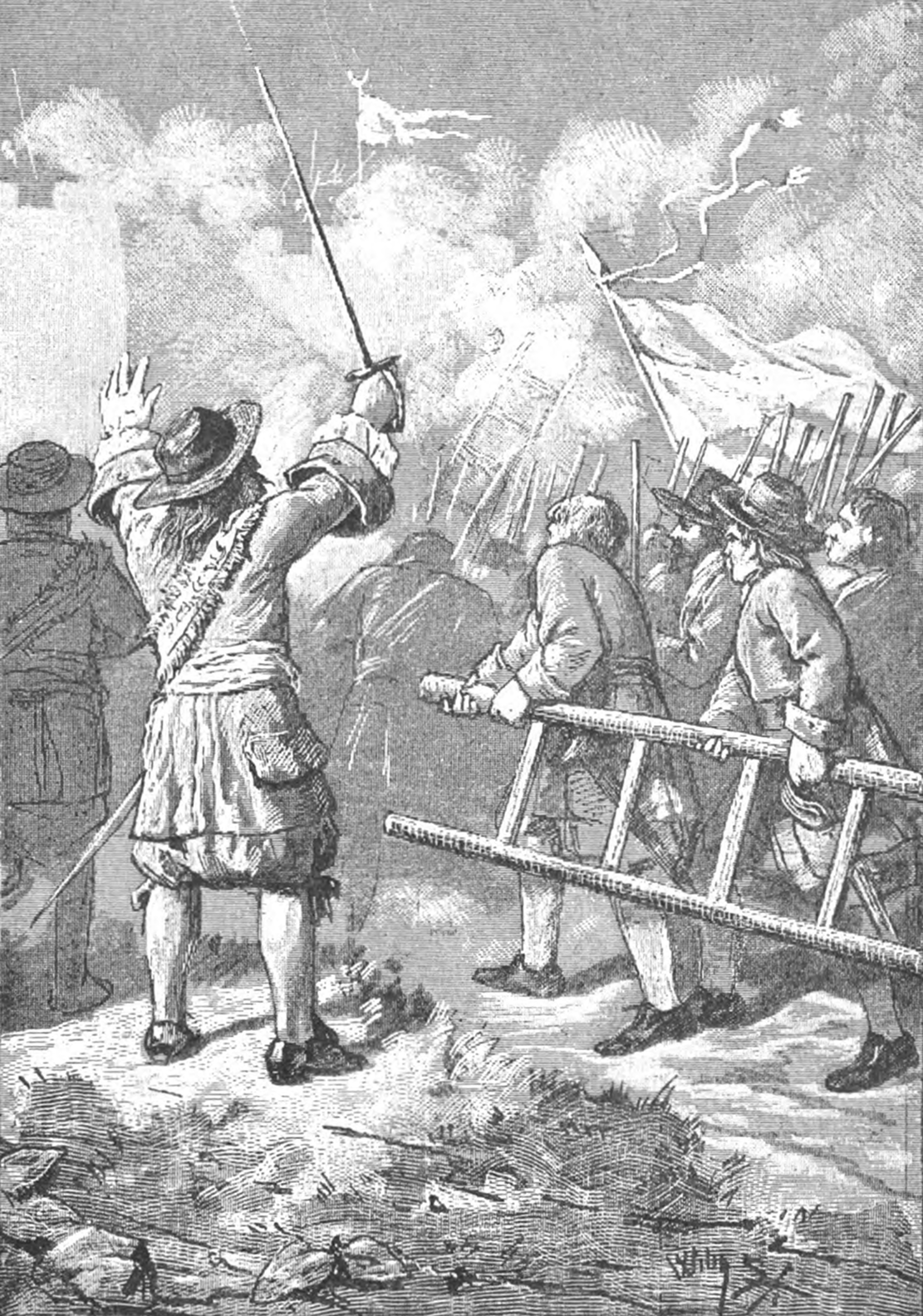
- VOC troops storming Trunajaya's stronghold in Kediri. Depicted in an 1890 Dutch children's novel.
Date	August–December 1678 (entire campaign); 25 November 1678 (the assault on Kediri)
Location	Java (in modern-day Indonesia), particularly East Java; Main fighting in Kediri, East Java
Result	Mataram–VOC victory

Belligerents
Mataram Sultanate; Dutch East India Company (VOC)	Forces of Trunajaya

Commanders and leaders
Amangkurat II; Anthonio Hurdt; Isaac de Saint Martin; François Tack	Trunajaya; Raden Suradipa †

Strength
Fluctuating between 1,000–13,000; 1,750	1,000 (according to VOC–Mataram); 14,500 (according to the rebels)

In a campaign that took place from August to December 1678 in Kediri (in modern-day East Java, Indonesia) during the Trunajaya rebellion, the forces of the Mataram Sultanate, led by Amangkurat II, and of the Dutch East India Company (VOC), led by Anthonio Hurdt, marched inland into eastern Java against Trunajaya's forces. After a series of marches beset by logistical difficulties and harassment by Trunajaya's forces, the Mataram–VOC army crossed the Brantas River on the night of 16–17 November. They then marched on Trunajaya's capital and stronghold at Kediri and took it by direct assault on 25 November. Kediri was plundered by the Dutch and Javanese victors, and the Mataram treasury—captured by Trunajaya after his victory at Plered—was completely lost in the looting. Trunajaya himself fled Kediri and continued his greatly weakened rebellion until his capture at the end of 1679.

During the march to Kediri, the Mataram–VOC army purposefully split itself into three columns which took different, indirect routes to Kediri, as suggested by Amangkurat. This enabled the army to meet more factions and to win over those with wavering allegiance, swelling its forces. The army marched through areas previously unexplored by the Dutch. The Dutch account was recorded in a journal by Hurdt's secretary Johan Jurgen Briel. Accounts of the campaign also appear in the Javanese chronicles, known as babads.

== Background ==
Map of Java, illustrating Mataram's expansions just before Amangkurat I took the throne in 1646

When Amangkurat I took the throne of Mataram in 1646, the Mataram Sultanate had expanded its control to most of central and eastern Java, as well as to Madura and to a few overseas vassals in southern Sumatra and Borneo—parts of today's Indonesia. In 1674, the Madurese prince Trunajaya allied with a group of Makassarese fighters started a rebellion against Amangkurat. The rebellion was initially successful: the rebels took Surabaya, the principal city of eastern Java, in late 1675, defeated the royal army at Gegodog in 1676, and captured most of the Javanese north coast by January 1677. Facing the imminent collapse of his authority, Amangkurat sought help from the Dutch East India Company (known as the "VOC", short for its Dutch name Vereenigde Oostindische Compagnie) which had by then established its trading and military presence in Batavia. What happened in Mataram was of a great importance to the VOC, because Batavia could not survive without food imports from central and eastern Java. The VOC also depended on timber from the Javanese north coast in order to build and repair ships for its trading fleet, and for new construction in the city. The VOC and Mataram agreed to a contract of alliance in February 1677, which was ratified by Amangkurat in March.

In May 1677, the VOC dispatched a large fleet to Surabaya, where Trunajaya held his court, and drove him out of the city. He retreated inland to establish a new rebel capital in Kediri, the capital city of the ancient Kediri Kingdom. However, one month later, Trunajaya's forces overran the Mataram court in Plered. The royal capital was sacked, the entire treasury was taken by the rebels, and King Amangkurat I—who was gravely ill—died during his retreat, throwing the Mataram government into disarray. He was succeeded by his son, Amangkurat II, who had fled with his father. Lacking an army, a treasury, and a working government, Amangkurat II went to Jepara, the headquarters of a VOC fleet under Admiral Cornelis Speelman, and in October signed a treaty renewing their alliance. In exchange for helping Mataram against his enemies, Amangkurat promised to pay the VOC 310,000 Spanish reals and about 5,000 tonnes (5,500 short tons) of rice. This covered payments for all previous VOC campaigns on Mataram's behalf up to October. In further agreements, he agreed to cede districts east of Batavia, as well as Semarang, Salatiga and its surrounding districts, and awarded the company a monopoly on the imports of textiles and opium into Mataram, as well as on the purchase of sugar from the Sultanate.

With the agreement concluded, Speelman and Amangkurat were eager to march quickly against the rebels, but this was delayed by the cautious policy of the VOC Governor-General Joan Maetsuycker, internal strife in the Mataram court, and some courtiers' opposition to the Dutch involvement. In November and December, there were only limited operations by Mataram forces with VOC support on the north coast, which were partial successes. In January 1678, Maetsuycker died and was succeeded by Rijklof van Goens, causing a shift in VOC policy, and by mid-1678 various challengers of Amangkurat or the VOC-Mataram alliance had died, paving the way for a more aggressive campaign. Speelman became director-general replacing the promoted van Goens. He left for Batavia and the VOC appointed Anthonio Hurdt, a former governor of Ambon, to replace him as commander, granting him the title "Superintendent, Admiral, Campaign- and War-Commander." Despite his long administrative service in Eastern Indonesia, at this time Hurdt had no experience in Java or in military campaigns, and was only selected due to a lack of more suitable candidates. The VOC was also joined by the forces of Arung Palakka, the Bugis warrior who had been the VOC's ally in the Makassar War (1666–69).

== Forces involved ==
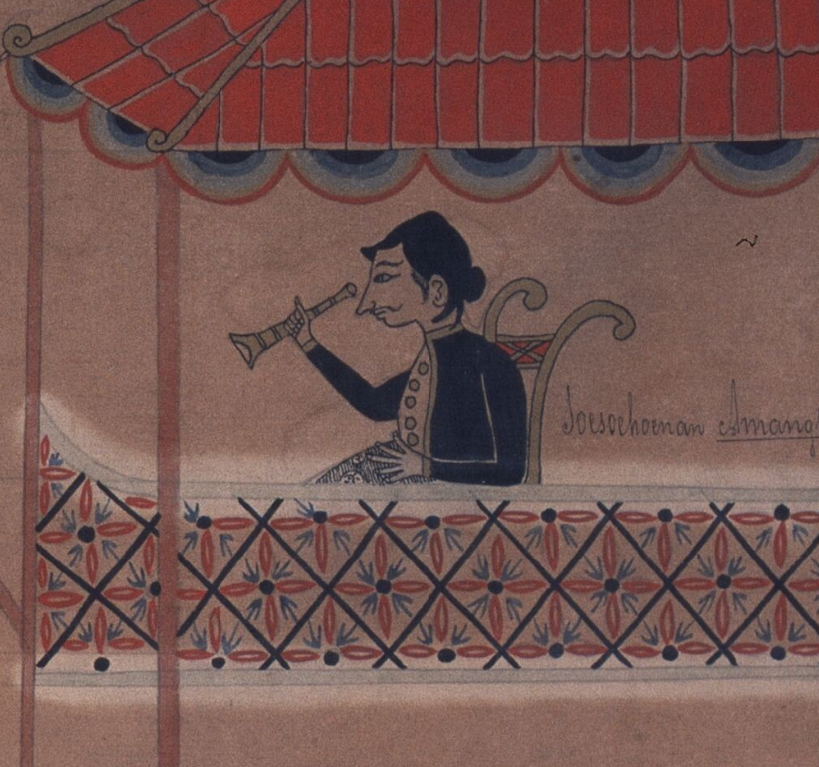
King Amangkurat II (pictured) personally led his troops in this campaign.

When the campaign began, the Mataram forces numbered 3,000 armed men and 1,000 porters. As the march progressed, new troops were levied along the way, and some lords declared their allegiance to the Mataram King, enlarging the royal army to 13,000 men. However, desertion reduced this army again, and during the assault on Kediri, the Mataram forces had only about 1,000 armed men. The initial 3,000 men were armed with pikes, but some of the later levies had firearms.

Before the start of the campaign, the VOC had 900 soldiers on Java's north coast, deployed as garrisons in various towns. An additional expeditionary force of 1,400 arrived at the start of the campaign. As the army marched, it was joined by the garrisons in the cities it passed. Indonesians of various ethnicities made up the majority of the VOC forces; European soldiers, marines and officers made up a minority. Desertion and disease caused the forces to dwindle—at the time of the assault on Kediri, the VOC had 1,750 men and only 1,200 joined the assault. The VOC-Mataram forces had artillery, but due to the limited ammunition, it was saved for the final assault.

The size of Trunajaya's forces is uncertain. VOC-Mataram reports put the number at 1,000, but later, Trunajaya's uncle Pangeran Sampang said that Trunajaya's followers numbered 14,500 just before the assault on Kediri. This force included hundreds of cavalry with chain mail armour. Trunajaya also built fortifications along the Brantas, particularly on the eastern side of the river where Kediri stood. Trunajaya's artillery generally outgunned the loyalists', and at some point the camps of Hurdt and Amangkurat were hit by his cannon. According to the historian of Indonesia M. C. Ricklefs, "it must have been emphasized that there appears to have been no significant technological difference" between the land forces of Trunajaya, those of the Javanese in general, and those of the VOC. The people of Java had manufactured gunpowder, muskets and cannon since at least the 1620s and probably long before, and they were also quick to adopt newer European military technologies. The VOC had an advantage in terms of discipline, strategy, and tactics, but not technology.

== Campaign ==
=== Planning ===
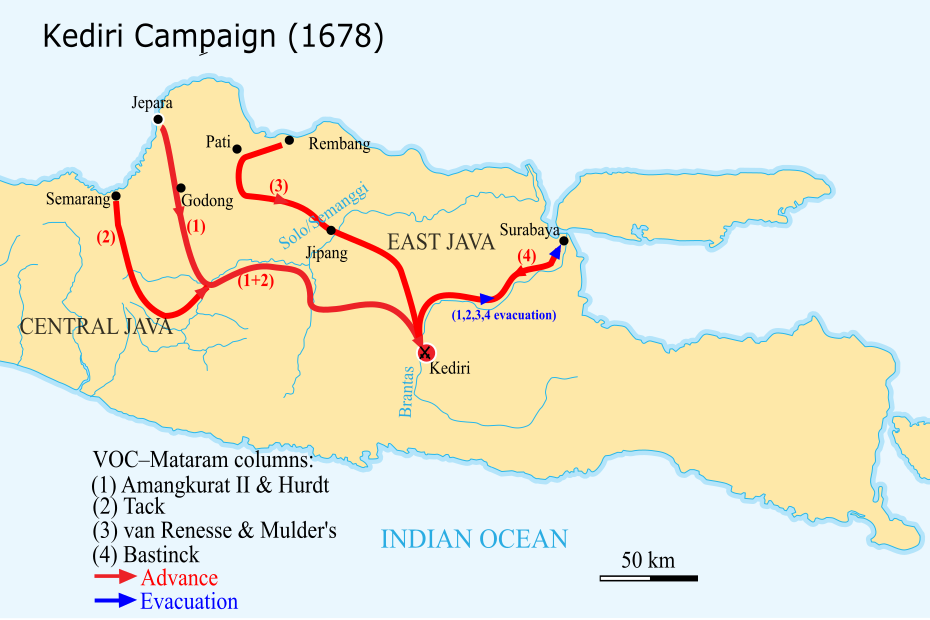
The Mataram–VOC march to Kediri. Instead of marching to Kediri directly from Surabaya—which would be the shortest route—the army split itself and took a longer route through Central and East Java, in order to impress factions whose allegiance were wavering and encourage them to join its side.

Hurdt wanted to attack Trunajaya's stronghold Kediri from Surabaya in coastal East Java, which would be the shortest route. In contrast, Amangkurat II proposed that the troops be divided into columns and march along multiple lengthy overland routes. He wanted the VOC-Mataram forces to march slowly through more areas in order to impress factions that were wavering over which side to take. This argument convinced Hurdt, and they decided to split the army into three different columns travelling via different overland routes from coastal Central Java to Kediri in inland East Java. In addition, a VOC merchant, Willem Bastinck, was to go to Surabaya to seek out Karaeng Galesong—a former Trunajaya ally, whose allegiance was wavering, and whose help and followers Mataram and the VOC hoped to enlist.

=== March to Kediri ===
The VOC and Mataram forces marched in three columns using different routes from coastal central Java to Kediri. Captain François Tack led what was to be the westernmost column and he left Jepara on 21 August for Semarang where the column started its overland march. To the east, a column led by Captains Abraham Daniel van Renesse and Frederik Hendrik Mulder left Rembang on 26 August. Meanwhile, the central column, which was to be the main force, was mobilized in Jepara led by Hurdt and Amangkurat. The central column sent advance detachments southward on 27 August and 2 September, while Hurdt and Amangkurat departed on 5 September.

The western column was reinforced by the garrison of Semarang and marched southward to the Pajang district, where it fought the followers of Trunajaya's ally Raden Kajoran. After an initial march, the central column re-assembled in Godong on the Serang River and stayed there for six days. Their artillery and supplies were brought there by river, but now had to join the southward march overland through enemy territory. The central and western columns then met in the Semanggi (now Solo) River valley and marched together from there, led by Hurdt and Amangkurat. Meanwhile, the eastern column passed Pati, was joined by the VOC troops there, and marched along a different route towards Kediri.

Throughout the march, the loyalist forces faced problems such as desertions, lack of discipline, illness, food shortages, and poor navigation. The march included several river crossings, which were made difficult by the lack of bridges, rivers swollen by heavy rain, as well as bogged down wagons and cannon. It was particularly difficult for the VOC forces, who marched through areas previously unexplored by them and were unfamiliar with the conditions of the Javanese interior. Hurdt wanted to stay in the Semanggi River valley, and to continue the campaign in the following year. Amangkurat preferred to keep marching, and his opinion prevailed. As the loyalist forces marched eastwards, the rebel forces avoided major battles. Instead, they fought skirmishes which continuously harassed the loyalists' foragers and stragglers. The loyalists scoured the countryside to collect food, causing panic among its inhabitants.

During the march, Amangkurat tried to gain the loyalty of the lords in the territories he passed through. Many were previously loyal to Kajoran, who sided with Trunajaya, or were wavering between the two sides. The presence of the King and his forces, as well as the possible booty to be gained in the campaign, motivated many of them to declare allegiance to Amangkurat and join his forces. At some point, the Javanese forces in the column reached 13,000.

=== Crossing of the Brantas ===
The Hurdt-Amangkurat army arrived at Singkal (today part of Nganjuk), on the west bank of the Brantas River north of Kediri, on 13 October. Kediri stood on the east bank of this river, and finding a way to cross it proved a major challenge for the loyalists. The Brantas was swollen by monsoon rains, and the army did not have the boats necessary to cross it. Rain, desertion and lack of supplies continued to plague them. Amangkurat's forces dropped to about 1,000, while the VOC had 1,750 soldiers left, 659 of them Europeans. Many of the soldiers had dysentery.

Meanwhile, Trunajaya's forces harassed the loyalist army. They had fortified posts along the river, especially on the east bank. These were equipped with cannon of various sizes up to twelve-pounders. Trunajaya's artillery continuously pounded the loyalists, even reaching Hurdt and Amangkurat's lodgings, as well as the army's field hospital. The loyalist army also had cannon, but it did not return fire, saving its limited ammunition for the eventual attack on Kediri. In addition, Trunajaya's cavalry engaged in skirmishes with the loyalists, causing casualties and undermining their morale. On 21 October, a night attack led by Raden Suradipa burned the VOC's Malay troops' quarters. The attack was eventually repelled and Suradipa, one of Trunajaya's brothers, was fatally wounded. On the night of 2–3 November, Trunajaya's skirmishers intimidated the VOC's sentries with the music of gamelan and mocking voices.

On 3 November, Hurdt and Amangkurat were joined by an additional column led by Willem Bastinck from Surabaya, accompanied by 800 ox-carts carrying supplies. This convoy was sent with help from the Duke of Tumapel, the VOC's Javanese ally, and Karaeng Galesong, a former ally of Trunajaya whose allegiance was wavering. On 6 November, rebel forces raided these carts, burnt around ten of them, and killed several people. The VOC later moved these supplies inside a palisade fortification built in the aftermath of Suradipa's attack.

With the arrival of fresh supplies, Hurdt and Amangkurat were emboldened to find ways to cross the river. Forces led by Dutch commander Isaac de Saint Martin drove Trunajaya's forces from Manukan, on the west bank further south from Singkal. They tried to cross the river there, but were unsuccessful due to heavy opposing fire and the depth of the water. They made another attempt on the night of 6–7 November, but their boats were sunk and it too failed. Hurdt was frustrated by the lack of progress, and gave Amangkurat an ultimatum that the VOC would withdraw unless the King supplied pontoons for the crossing, and matches for its soldiers' matchlocks.

The river's depth dropped during the night of 16–17 November. The Javanese chronicle (babad) attributed this to Amangkurat's supernatural powers, and said that this happened as Amangkurat personally rode across the river leading his troops. The army's foot soldiers crossed in boats at Curing, just south of Singkal. Those on horseback did not need boats. The river was about 115 metres (126 yd) wide at the crossing. Trunajaya's forces bombarded them with artillery as they crossed, before being driven out, leaving eleven cannon behind.

=== Capture of Kediri ===
With a bridgehead successfully established at Curing, the loyalist army marched southward towards Kediri. At this point the VOC troops numbered 1,200, and Amangkurat's troops about 1,000. They were split into two columns under the respective commands of Hurdt and de Saint Martin. Amangkurat himself returned to the relative safety of Singkal. Trunajaya's forces tried unsuccessfully to stop this advance. On 25 November, the army attacked Kediri itself. The city was about 8.5 kilometres (5.3 mi) in circumference, defended by 43 artillery batteries and by walls up to 6 metres (20 ft) high and 2 metres (6.6 ft) thick. According to Ricklefs, Kediri's fortifications "seem not to have been inferior to contemporary European fortresses". Hurdt's column entered the city from the east, while de Saint Martin entered from the northwest. As was common in Javanese siege warfare of the time, the assault was accompanied by cannon fire, as well as loud yelling and the playing of drums and gongs to weaken the defender's morale. De Saint Martin arrived first in the alun-alun (city square) of Kediri, near Trunajaya's residence. The defenders put up a fierce resistance. Four VOC companies, under the command of Tack, engaged in "courtyard-by-courtyard" fighting to conquer Trunajaya's residential compound in the city centre. VOC troops made use of hand grenades which proved very useful in city fighting.

The loyalist troops were victorious. Trunajaya fled southwards into the countryside, and his side suffered heavy losses. The VOC suffered light casualties of 7 dead and 27 wounded. Among Mataram troops, two senior noblemen died in the fighting; the first was Tumenggung Mangkuyuda, and sources disagree on the second, variously naming Tumenggung Melayu, Demang Mangunjaya or Tumenggung Mataram. The victorious army then plundered Trunajaya's abandoned court. The Mataram treasury, brought to Kediri by the rebels after their sack of the Mataram capital in 1677, was among the targets of the looting. Amangkurat and the VOC had hoped to recover this treasury and use it to pay for the VOC's assistance in the war, but it was completely looted by the soldiers instead. The VOC found, and executed, ten Europeans who had deserted to Trunajaya's side. The victors also found abducted Mataram women, horses, and holy regalia (pusaka). The captured regalia included a special cannon, named "Nyai Setomi" and called mriyem berkat ("blessed cannon") and wasiyat Mataram ("Mataram's heirloom"), which was considered an important heirloom of the Mataram royal dynasty. Several pro-Trunajaya nobles, including the Duke of Sampang, surrendered to Amangkurat.

==== The Golden Crown ====
The victors also found a golden crown among the booty. It was reputed to be from the fifteenth-century Majapahit empire, during which there were reports of the use of a golden crown. The crown was handed to Tack, who insisted on the payment of 1,000 rijkdaalders before giving it to Amangkurat. This behaviour seemed to offend the King and might have contributed to Tack's death at the Mataram court in 1686. On 27 November, Hurdt presented the crown to the King, who proceeded to wear it. In an act of cultural misunderstanding, the VOC fired musket and cannon salutes, thinking the event was a coronation in the European sense. In reality, crowns did not have ceremonial importance in Javanese royal protocol. This episode attracted much attention among later historians. Dutch historian H. J. de Graaf opined that the King would later consider this event as a symbol of the European's condescension and that they were instrumental to the King's legitimacy.

== Withdrawal ==
With Trunajaya expelled, and the looting finished, the loyalist army left Kediri for Surabaya, the principal city and port of East Java. Kediri's fortifications were dismantled and a governor was installed to rule the city. A river convoy left on 15 December, which included Hurdt, Tack, van Renesse, 288 VOC sick and wounded, field cannon and their ammunition. The rest, including Amangkurat and de Saint Martin, left overland on 18 December. Heavy currents and the rainy season made this journey difficult. The river convoy arrived in Surabaya on 17 December having lost some boats and men. The overland march was even more difficult. The roads were flooded and impassable. Many died from sheer exhaustion, "hungry, tired and spent like beasts along the road and indeed in the water", according to the VOC's journal written by Hurdt's secretary. The army reached Perning on 24 December, upriver from Surabaya, and was cut off by floods. Some managed to reach Surabaya by boat, and the rest arrived on 5 January having travelled overland.

Amangkurat and his retinue established the royal court in Surabaya, a city with which he was familiar. He was descended from the former dynasty of Surabaya through his mother, and was once a viceroy of East Java during his father's reign. Subsequently, Hurdt and other VOC officers left for Batavia. Christiaan Poleman took over the command of the VOC forces in East Java.

== Aftermath ==
The Dutch-Mataram victory at Kediri weakened Trunajaya's rebellion but the war was not over. Trunajaya and his retinue were still at large in the highlands of Malang around east Java; he was not captured until December 1679. His ally Kajoran established a new base in Mlambang, Central Java, and engaged in successful operations there up to his death in September 1679. Amangkurat's brother Pangeran Puger still held Mataram's court at Plered where he maintained a rival claim to the throne until 1681. By the early 1680s, all rebel leaders had died, surrendered, or been defeated, and the war came to an end.

With this campaign, the VOC was now fully associated with Amangkurat. However, the King could not pay the VOC as promised because his treasury, which he hoped to recover in Kediri, was looted by the VOC's and his own soldiers. The VOC also perceived incompetence in the King and a lack of loyalty in his people. Nevertheless, the VOC continued to fight on his side until the end of the war.

== Legacy ==
Dutch commander Hurdt's secretary, Johan Jurgen Briel, wrote a diary of the campaign, which became an important historical source. In 1971, the diary was edited by the historian H. J. de Graaf and published in the Linschoten-Vereeniging. The campaign also appears in Javanese chronicles (babad), including the Babad Kraton written by Raden Tumenggung Jayengrat in Yogyakarta during 1777–78.
