= Poerbatjaraka =

Javanese/Indonesian self-taught philologist and professor (1884–1964)

Mpu Prof. Dr. Raden Mas Ngabehi Poerbatjaraka
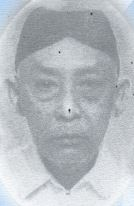
- A portrait of Poerbatjaraka on the cover of a 2006 book commemorating him.
- Born: Lesya; 1 January 1884; Surakarta, Surakarta Sunanate, Dutch East Indies
- Died: 25 July 1964 (aged 80); Jakarta, Indonesia
- Occupations: Philologist, professor
- Known for: works on the Javanese literature
- Spouse: B.RAy. Roosinah Poeger
- Children: RAj. Ratna Saraswati Poerbatjaraka, RAy. Ratna Himawati Poerbatjaraka, Prof. RM. Purnadi Poerbatjaraka SH.
- Awards: Honorary Member, Royal Netherlands Institute of Southeast Asian and Caribbean Studies; Posthumous honour of Bintang Mahaputera Utama

Academic background
- Education: Leiden University

Poerbatjaraka (EYD: Purbacaraka; 1 January 1884 – 25 July 1964) was a Javanese-Indonesian self-taught philologist and professor, specialising in Javanese literature. The eldest son of a Surakarta royal courtier in the Dutch East Indies, he showed interest in Javanese literature at an early age, reading from books in the court's collection. Despite attending only primary school, his knowledge of Dutch and Javanese literature allowed him to take a position at the colony's Archaeology Service, and then at Leiden University in the Netherlands. He was allowed to obtain a doctor's degree at Leiden. He then returned to the colony to work at a Batavia (today Jakarta) museum, cataloguing Javanese texts and writing scholarly works. After Indonesia's independence, he became a professor at the universities of Indonesia, Gajah Mada, and Udayana.

== Names and titles ==
It was common for a Javanese gentleman of Poerbatjaraka's time to change names and be given new titles throughout his life. His birth name was Raden Mas Lesya (also spelled Lesja or Lesyo, meaning "humorous"). When he served at the court he became known as Lesya Atmopradonggo. After his first move to Jakarta, he became known as Poerbatjaraka and was later granted the additional title Ngabehi.

The spelling of his adult name, "Poerbatjaraka", was Dutch and the one he always used. In later Indonesian texts his name may be spelled "Purbacaraka" (using the latest spelling system), or "Purbatjaraka" (using the Republican Spelling System). The first part of the name, Purba or Poerba, was from Sanskrit purwa ("first"), and his father's name prefix. The second part, tjaraka or caraka was from hanacaraka, the name of the Javanese script, meaning ambassador or envoy.

== Early life and family ==
Poerbatjaraka was born as Raden Mas Lesya on 1 January 1884 in Surakarta, the capital of Surakarta Sunanate, a monarchy which was then part of the Dutch East Indies. He was the eldest son of Raden Mas Tumenggung Purbadipura, a noble courtier to the Sunan (monarch) Pakubuwana X. Purbadipura was close to the monarch, and took on multiple roles, including those comparable to a European master of the robes, a barber, a divination doctor, and a composer.

Lesya attended the Hollands-Indische School (HIS), a primary level, colonial school for Indies natives. He was not given further education, which was common for children in his position. He was interested in Dutch (the language of administration and scholarship at the time) and often talked to Dutch soldiers in his area to learn and practice the language. During his childhood, his love for classical Javanese literature began as he read works found in his father's library. He also read a book on old Javanese literature by the professor Hendrik Kern. It was a gift from a Dutch official to Pakubuwana, who did not read Dutch, and gave it to Purbadipura. Once, when literary-minded courtiers had a discussion about Old Javanese poems, his insight from the book allowed him to solve a problem in explaining difficult passages, contradicting the more senior courtiers. This caused him serious trouble as it was not his place to do this. He began to feel uncomfortable at court and wrote to the Dutch resident (the top colonial official in Surakarta). This correspondence resulted in an appointment in Batavia, the capital of the Dutch East Indies, with the colony's Archeological Service.

== Career ==
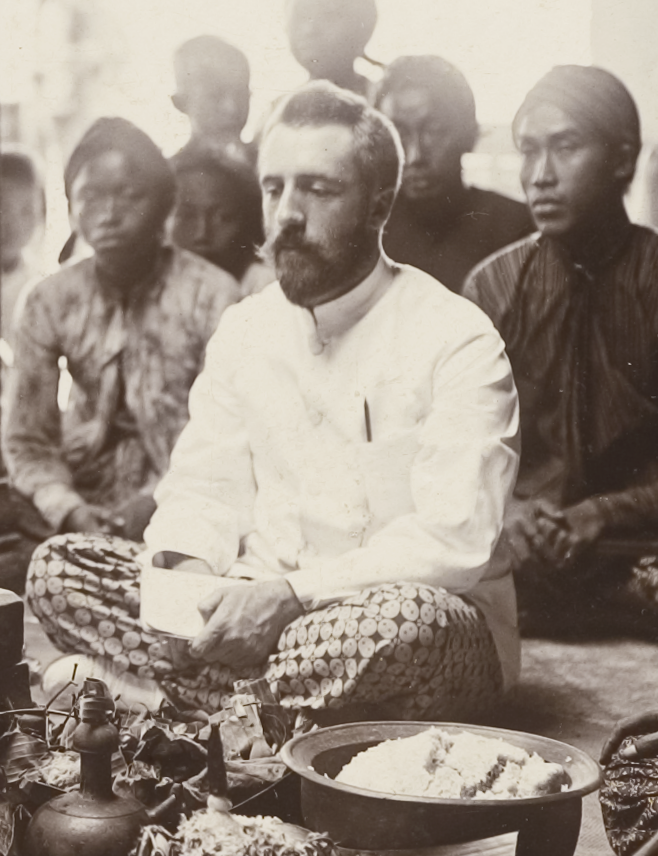
Dr. G. A. J. Hazeu, for whom Poerbatjaraka worked as an assistant at Leiden University.

In 1910, Poerbatjaraka moved to Batavia to take the Archaeology Service position. His knowledge of Javanese literature proved very useful to the institution, and he was often consulted by its staff. During these years he also learned Sanskrit. He was given a new name, Poerbatjaraka (Purbacaraka in modern Indonesian spelling) and was given the additional title Ngabehi. After several years in Batavia, he was recruited by Leiden University in the Netherlands. He became assistant to a scholar of Javanese culture Dr. G. A. J. Hazeu, and taught Javanese language classes. Despite not having the prerequisite academic requirements, he was given special dispensation and allowed to pursue a doctorate, which he did without attending lectures. He completed his doctor's degree cum laude in 1926, with his thesis titled "Agastya in den Archipel" ("Agastya in Nusantara").

He then returned to Batavia and worked at the Museum of the Royal Batavian Society of Arts and Sciences (today the National Museum of Indonesia), and catalogued the museum's large collection of Javanese texts, accumulated over nearly a century. While doing this, he wrote monographs on several groups of manuscripts, containing their Dutch summaries and indexes of names. In Batavia, he also met the future historian of Java, H. J. de Graaf, to whom he gave weekly lessons in Javanese culture and language between 1927 and 1930. De Graaf later considered Poerbatjaraka his "revered teacher" and praised him for "unveil[ing] some of the secrets of your people".

After Indonesia's independence, he became a professor, teaching at Gajah Mada University in Jogjakarta, the University of Indonesia in Jakarta, and Udayana University in Denpasar, Bali. He was one of the founders of Udayana's Literature Department. He continued to write about Javanese history and literature for journals both in Indonesia and the Netherlands. In 1952, he published a collection of his studies in a book entitled Kapustakaan Djawi. He was made an honorary member of the Royal Netherlands Institute of Southeast Asian and Caribbean Studies in 1963. In 1964, the Indonesian Journal of Cultural Studies published a volume of twenty-six articles in his honour to mark his 80th birthday. On 25 July of the same year, he died in Jakarta.

== Scholarly style and works ==
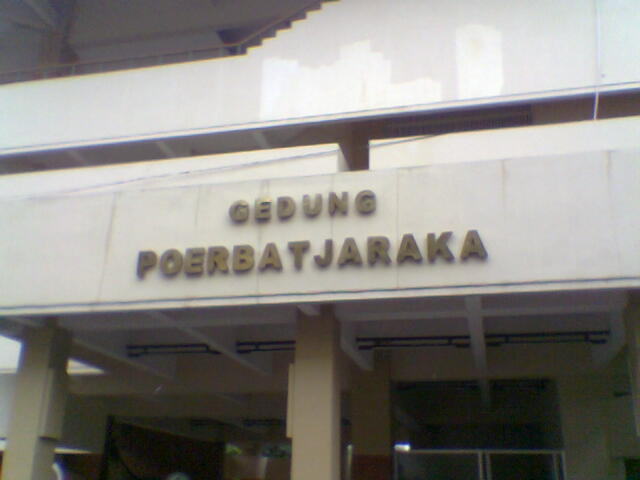
The Literature Department's faculty building named after Poerbatjaraka at Gajah Mada University, Yogyakarta.

With limited formal education, Poerbatjaraka was largely an autodidact. Early in his career, he was criticized as "amateurish", and lacking a "scholarly accurateness". According to the Javanese literature scholar Th. Pigaud, he made up for this with his extensive knowledge of Javanese literature, of all things Javanese in general, and by his zeal for Javanese studies. As he matured, he gained respect among both Europeans and his fellow Indonesians. His works combined the scientific method—which was uncommon among Indonesian native authors at his time—with his intimate knowledge of his subjects as an insider. He was often critical of the text and manuscript that he worked on, noticing spelling errors, and preferring to compare multiple sources before publishing a manuscript. Pigeaud said that his works and his behaviour often showed a sense of humour characteristic of a punokawan (jesters in Javanese wayangs). During his retirement in Jakarta, he did not stop working. De Graaf said that during this period he was "quietly but indefatigably studying and publishing".

According to his biography by Indonesia's Education and Cultural Ministry, he published seventy-nine works throughout his life, while Pigeaud put the number at seventy-three. His works focus on the epigraphy of old Javanese literature. They were written mostly in Dutch and, after Indonesia's independence in 1945, he also wrote in Indonesian and Javanese.

Among his notable works, he published studies on Agastya, the Old Javanese works Smaradahana, Arjunawiwaha, Ramayana and, with C. Hooykaas, the Bharatayudha. His study on the Ramayana established that, based on language, metrics, titles of officials and description of a temple, the Old Javanese version of the epic poem originated at the end of the ninth or the beginning of the tenth century. This finding was later confirmed by other studies, including one by Hooykaas. Later in his career, he published Kapustakan Djawi ("Javanese Literature"), which surveyed eighty-four old and modern Javanese literary works. He also published what he intended to be the first volume of Riwajat Indonesia ("The History of Indonesia"), covering the country's history up to the eighth century. No further volume was published until his death.

== Personal life ==
Poerbatjaraka was born into the royal family of Surakarta. His father, Kanjeng Raden Mas Tumenggung Purbadipura, was close to Sunan Pakubuwana IX and raised his son and heir, Pakubuwana X. The name Poerbatjaraka, meaning "First Ambassador," was given by Pakubuwana X, who allowed him to be sent to Leiden, Netherlands as a representative. On his return, Poerbatjaraka was commanded by Pakubuwana X to marry Bendara Raden Ayu Roosinah Poeger, a daughter of Gusti Pangeran Haryo Poeger of the Yogyakarta royal family, in order to calm the tension between the two courts. A Javanese noble of great standing, he was proud of his Surakarta aristocratic heritage, as he was well remembered for always wearing Surakarta royal court clothing until his death. Throughout his life, Poerbatjaraka never hesitated to share his knowledge and wisdom, as he was always willing to help his many relatives. Members of the Poerbatjaraka family descended from Sunan Pakubuwana X of Keraton Surakarta, Sultan Hamengkubuwana VI of Keraton Yogyakarta and Prince Mangkunegara I of Keraton Mangkunegaran.
