= Solomon Swale =

English politician

Sir Solomon Swale, 1st Baronet (14 February 1610 – 4 November 1678) was an English politician who sat in the House of Commons from 1660 to 1678.

Swale was the son of Francis Swale of South Stainley, Yorkshire, and his wife Anne Ingleby, daughter of Sampson Ingleby. He was educated at St Peter's School, York admitted to Gray's Inn on 2 February 1630.

In 1660, Swale was elected Member of Parliament for Aldborough in the Convention Parliament. He was created baronet of Swale Hall in the County of York on 21 June 1660. He was re-elected MP for Aldborough in 1661 for the Cavalier Parliament. He was appointed High Sheriff of Yorkshire in 1670. In June 1678 he was expelled from the House of Commons for recusancy (refusing to attend Church of England services).

Swale died in the King's Bench prison, as a debtor, at the age of 68 and was buried at St Martin in the Fields, London.

Swale married firstly Mary Porey, daughter of Robert Porey of Poreys Norfolk and had seven sons and three daughters. He married secondly Anne Tancred, daughter of Charles Tancred of Wixley, Yorkshire. His son Henry succeeded to the baronetcy.

Parliament of England
Vacant No representatives in the restored Rump Title last held by Francis Goodricke; John Lambert	Member of Parliament for Aldborough; 1660 – 1678; With: Francis Goodricke to 1673; Sir John Reresby, Bt from 1673	Succeeded by Sir John Reresby, Bt; Ruisshe Wentworth
Baronetage of England
New creation	Baronet (of Swale Hall); 1660–1678	Succeeded by Henry Swale
