= John Gascoigne (died 1602) =

English politician

John Gascoigne (by 1537–1602), of Parlington, Yorkshire, was an English politician.

He was a member (MP) of the parliament of England for Aldborough in 1558.
