= Sir Henry Savile, 1st Baronet =

English politician

Sir Henry Savile, 1st Baronet (1579 – 23 June 1632) was an English politician.

== Life ==
The eldest son of Sir John Savile, he matriculated at Merton College, Oxford, on 4 February 1584, but left without a degree, entering the Middle Temple in 1593. He was knighted at the coronation of James I, on 23 July 1603, and created a baronet on 29 June 1611.

Savile represented Aldborough in parliament from 1604 to 1611, and again in 1614. Before 1627 he became vice-president of the Council of the North, serving under Thomas Wentworth. In 1629 he was knight of the shire for Yorkshire. He died on 23 June 1632.

== Family ==
Savile married Mary, daughter of John Dent, citizen of London, by whom he had three sons, all of whom predeceased him without issue. The baronetcy therefore expired on his death. His widow married Sir William Sheffield.

Parliament of England
Preceded by Sir Edward Cecil; Richard Theakston	Member of Parliament for Aldborough; 1604–1614; With: Edmund Sheffield 1604-11; George Wetherid 1614	Succeeded by Christopher Wandesford; John Carvile
Preceded by Henry Belasyse; Sir Thomas Wentworth	Member of Parliament for Yorkshire; 1629; With: Henry Belasyse	Parliament suspended until 1640
Baronetage of England
New creation	Baronet of Metheley; 1611–1632	Extinct
