= Anthonio Hurdt =

Director-General of the Dutch East Indies
- In office 1684–1687
- Governor General: Joannes Camphuys
- Preceded by: Balthazar Bort
- Succeeded by: unknown

Commander of the VOC forces on the Javanese pasisir
- In office July 1678 – December 1678
- Governor General: Rijklof van Goens
- Preceded by: Isaac de Saint-Martin
- Succeeded by: Christiaan Poleman

Personal details
- Born: c. 1630
- Died: 1689 (aged 58–59)

Anthonio Hurdt (c. 1630 – 1689; also spelt Anthony Hurdt and Anthonij Hurt) was a Dutch East India Company (VOC) officer active in what is now Indonesia in the seventeenth century. He was initially assigned in civilian positions in Eastern Indonesia, the latest of which was the VOC Governor of Ambon. He was then posted to Java—in Western Indonesia—to lead the Kediri campaign (also known as the Hurdt expedition) against Trunajaya. After a protracted march slowed by logistical challenges, VOC and its ally Mataram overran Trunajaya and took his stronghold and court at Kediri, 25 November 1678. After the campaign he served in Batavia, becoming Director-General of the VOC in the Indies from 1684 to 1687, when he was expelled due to a dispute with Governor-General Joannes Camphuys.

== Career ==
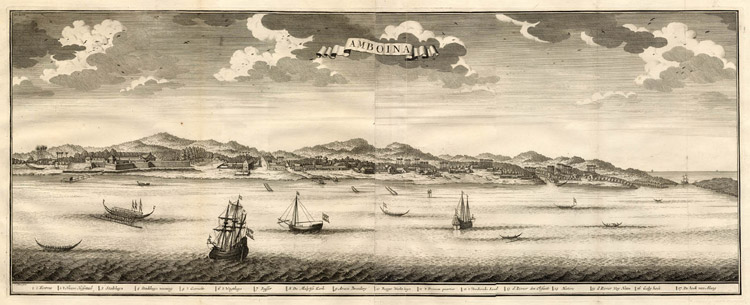
Ambon, where Hurdt served as governor from 1672 to 1678

=== Eastern Indonesia ===
Hurdt spent his initial career in the eastern part of what is now Indonesia. VOC records show he arrived in Batavia on 22 July 1652. He was then posted to Ambon to serve as secretary. From 1657 to 1661 he became a VOC leader in Lontor, Banda Islands. He then served various positions in multiple locations, including Ambon, Banjarmasin, Timor and Banda. From 1672 to 1678, he was the VOC Governor of Ambon; he finished his term just before being assigned to Java.

=== Military commander in Java ===
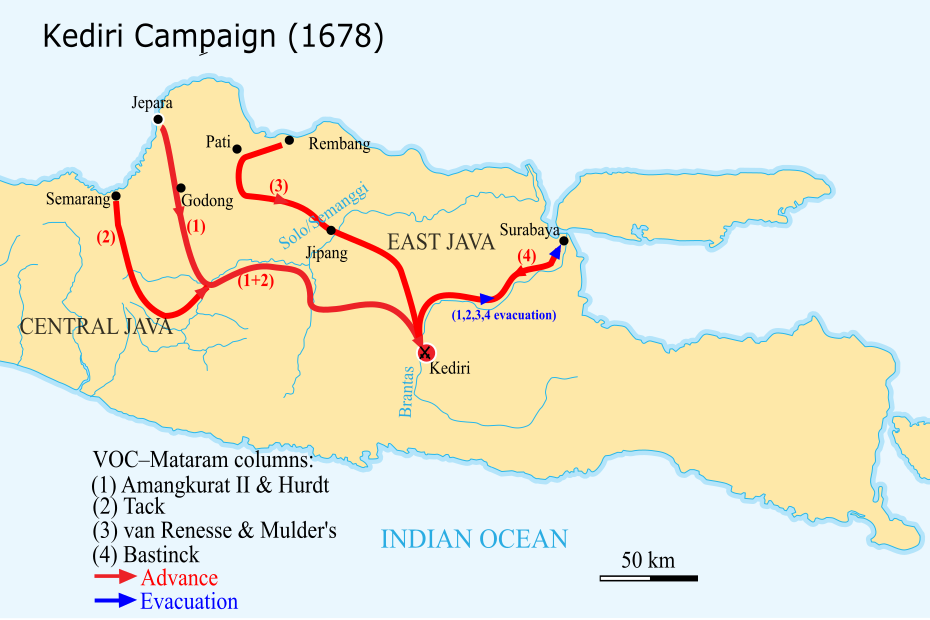
Hurdt's campaign to Kediri, 1678

In mid 1678 Hurdt was appointed to command VOC forces on the coast of Java. He replaced Admiral Cornelis Speelman who went to Batavia to become the VOC Director-General. The VOC was campaigning in Java to help its ally the Mataram Sultanate to defeat Trunajaya, Mataram's former subject who led a major rebellion. Hurdt was selected despite his lack of experience in Java or military experience anywhere. He arrived in Java on July 1678. He—now titled "Superintendent, Admiral, Campaign- and War-Commander"—then led the campaign to take Kediri, Trunajaya's capital and stronghold in inland Java. During this campaign the VOC marched together with the Mataram forces led by its king Amangkurat II. After a series of marches beset by logistical difficulties, the Mataram–VOC forces took Kediri by storm on 25 November. This campaign was VOC's first exploration of the Javanese inland. VOC's account of the journey was recorded by Hurdt's secretary Johan Jurgen Briel, and this journal later became an important historical source.

After the taking of Kediri, Hurdt left for Batavia and his command was taken by Christiaan Poleman.

=== Political career in Batavia ===
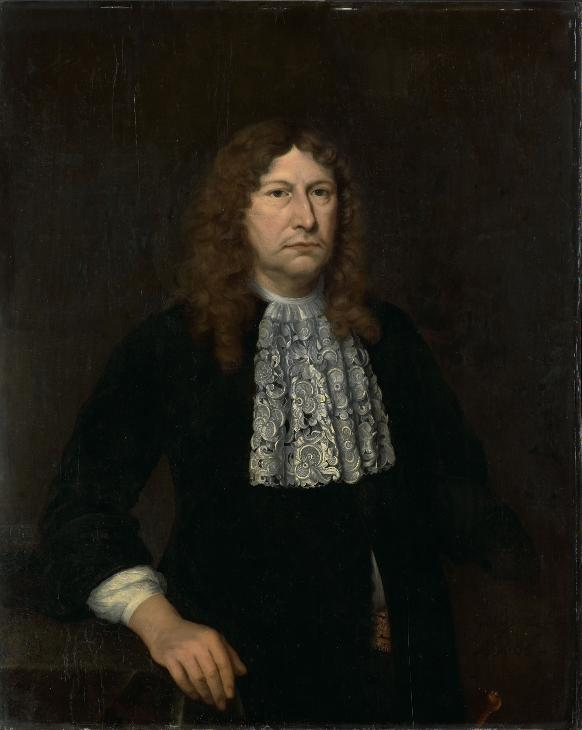
Joannes Camphuys, Governors-General of the Dutch East Indies (1684–91) and Hurdt's political rival

In January 1684 Speelman—who had been Governor-General since 1681—died. Hurdt was one of the contenders to replace him, but the Council of the Indies instead appointed Joannes Camphuys, who was supported by the younger faction of the Council. Hurdt was appointed Director-General—the second-highest officer after Governor-General. After this point, the Council of the Indies was split between the supporters of Camphuys and Hurdt. The dispute culminated in 1687, when Hurdt refused to attend the Council's meetings, and eventually was expelled from the council by the VOC directorate in Amsterdam.

== Personal character ==
In M. C. Ricklefs's War, Culture and Economy in Java, 1677–1726 he is described to be "a short, pock-marked Dutchman" who was in his forties when he took over the military command in Java in 1678.
