= Anthony Tailboyes =

16th-century English politician

Anthony Tailboyes (died 1584), of Skirmington, County Durham, was an English politician.

He was a member (MP) of the parliament of England for Aldborough in 1563.
