= Brian Palmes =

English politician

Sir Bryan Palmes (c. 1600–1654) was an English politician who sat in the House of Commons in 1626 and 1640. He fought on the Royalist side in the English Civil War.

Palmes was the son of Guy Palmes of Ashwell, Rutland, and his wife Ann Stafford, daughter of Sir Edward Stafford. He was educated at Wadham College, Oxford after matriculating at Trinity College, Oxford in 1615.

In 1626 was elected Member of Parliament for Stamford. In April 1640, he was elected Member of Parliament for Aldborough in the Short Parliament.

Palmes was knighted on 21 April 1642. In the Civil War, he raised a regiment for King Charles I. He later compounded for his estate.

Palmes married Mary Tevery, daughter of Gervase Tevery, of Stapleford, They had 6 sons (4 of whom predeased him) and 4 daughters. Palmes's marriage linked him to his father's friend Sir Thomas Wentworth, Earl of Stafford.

Parliament of England
Preceded by Montagu Bertie; John St Amand	Member of Parliament for Stamford; 1626; With: Montagu Bertie	Succeeded by Sir Thomas Hatton, 1st Baronet; Sir Edward Bashe
Vacant Parliament suspended since 1629	Member of Parliament for Aldborough; 1640; With: Richard Aldborough	Succeeded by Richard Aldborough; Robert Strickland
