= Richard Aldborough =

English politician

Richard Aldborough (1607 – October 1648) of Ellenthorpe Hall, Aldborough, Yorkshire was an English politician who sat in the House of Commons between 1625 and 1644. He supported the Royalist side in the English Civil War.

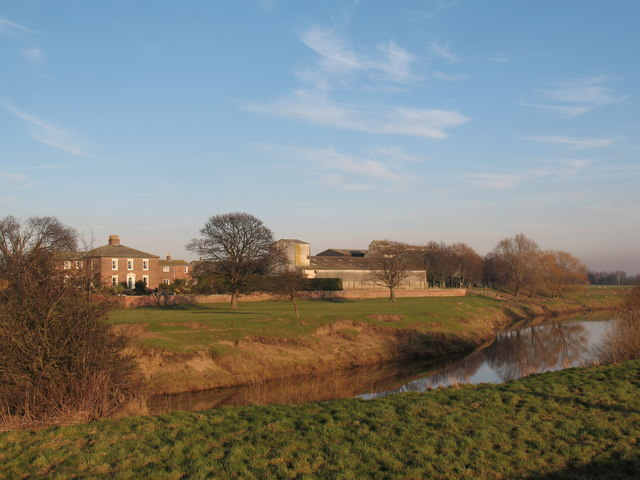
Ellenthorpe Hall, Aldborough

Aldborough was the son of Arthur Aldborough (1585 - after 1653) and his wife Elizabeth Holland, daughter of Richard Holland of Denton, Lancashire. He was educated at Magdalene College, Cambridge.

Aldborough was elected Member of Parliament for Aldborough in 1625 and 1626. In April 1640, he was elected to represent Aldborough in the Short Parliament and re-elected in November 1640 for the Long Parliament, but was disabled from sitting in 1643 for supporting the king. Although his father had the Parliamentarian army quartered on his estates in 1644 the family supported the King during the Civil War. Aldborough was treated as a delinquent and his estates at Humberton were sequestrated. Following his death his son William begged Parliament for the release of the estates in 1650.

He is thought to have died in exile in Rotterdam in 1648, predeceasing his father. He had married in 1627, Alice, the daughter of William Mallory of Studley, Yorkshire and had 4 sons. Following his death his son William begged Parliament for the release of the estates in 1650. Richard's father sold Aldborough manor and most of his other estates in 1653.

Parliament of England
Vacant Parliament suspended since 1629	Member of Parliament for Aldborough; 1640–1643; With: Brian Palmes 1640; Robert Strickland 1640–1642	Succeeded by Brian Stapylton; Thomas Scott
