= Francis Goodricke =

Francis Goodricke (1621 – 18 August 1673) was an English lawyer and politician who sat in the House of Commons at various times between 1659 and 1673.

Goodricke was the son of Sir Henry Goodricke, of Great Ribston, Yorkshire. He was called to the bar at Lincoln's Inn.

In April 1659, Goodricke was elected Member of Parliament for Aldborough in the Third Protectorate Parliament. In 1660, he was elected MP for Aldborough in the Convention Parliament. He was re-elected MP for Aldborough in 1661 for the Cavalier Parliament and sat until his death in 1673.

Goodricke became King's Counsel and a reader at Lincoln's Inn. The custom had been established that the reader should provide a feasts for the Inn, a factor used to explain a decline in the number of barristers prepared to become readers. Goodricke's feast in 1673 was said to be particularly sumptuous.

Parliament of England
Preceded by Not represented in Second Protectorate Parliament	Member of Parliament for Aldborough; 1659; With: John Lambert	Succeeded by Not represented in restored Rump
