= Aldborough (constituency) =

Parliamentary constituency in England, 1558–1832

- Former borough constituency for the House of Commons
- County: West Riding of Yorkshire
- Borough: Aldborough

1558–1832
- Seats: 2
- Replaced by: West Riding of Yorkshire

Aldborough was a parliamentary borough located in the West Riding of Yorkshire, abolished in the Great Reform Act 1832.

== Boundaries ==
Aldborough was a small borough (not even including the whole parish of Aldborough, since Boroughbridge, also within the boundaries, was also a borough with its own two MPs). By the time of the Reform Act 1832 it had a population only just over 500 and an electorate of less than 100. This made it a pocket borough and easy for the local landowner to dominate.

== History ==
Aldborough returned two Members of Parliament (MPs) from 1558 until 1832. It was a "scot and lot" borough, meaning that any man paying the poor rate was eligible to vote.

In the 18th century, Aldborough was controlled by the Duke of Newcastle. In April 1754 Newcastle, who had just become Prime Minister, selected his junior colleague and future Prime Minister, William Pitt (Pitt the Elder), to sit as its MP. Pitt represented Aldborough for two-and-a-half years, but having fallen out with Newcastle and been dismissed from his ministry, he was forced to find a new constituency when he next needed to be re-elected to the Commons in 1756.

== Members of Parliament ==
- Constituency created (1558)

=== MPs 1558–1640 ===
Parliament	First member	Second member
1558	John Gascoigne II	John Browne II
1559	Richard Onslow	Richard Assheton
1563	William Lambarde	Anthony Tailboyes
1571	Thomas Eynns	Barnaby Googe
1572	Richard Bunny II	Richard Tempest
1584	William Waad	David Waterhouse
1586	George Horsey	Ralph Hurleston
1588	Thomas Fairfax, 1st Lord Fairfax of Cameron	David Waterhouse
1593	Andrew Fisher	Edward Hancock
1597	Henry Bellasis	Richard Gargrave
1601	Sir Edward Cecil	Richard Theakston
1604–1611	Sir Henry Savile	Sir Edmund Sheffield
1614	Sir Henry Savile	George Wetherid
1621	Christopher Wandesford	John Carvile
1624	Christopher Wandesford	John Carvile
1625	Richard Aldborough	John Carvile
1626	Richard Aldborough	John Carvile
1628	Henry Darley	Robert Stapleton
1629–1640	No Parliaments summoned	

=== MPs 1640–1832 ===
Year	First member	First party	Second member	Second party
April 1640	Richard Aldeburgh	Royalist	Brian Palmes	Royalist
November 1640	Richard Aldeburgh	Royalist	Robert Strickland	Royalist
September 1642	Richard Aldeburgh	Royalist	Strickland disabled to sit – seat vacant	
January 1643	Aldeburgh disabled to sit – seat vacant		Strickland disabled to sit – seat vacant	
1645	Thomas Scott (died January 1648)		Brian Stapylton	
March (?) 1648	James Chaloner		Brian Stapylton	
December 1648	James Chaloner		Stapylton not recorded as having sat after Pride's Purge	
1653	Aldborough was unrepresented in the Barebones Parliament and the First and Second Parliaments of the Protectorate			
January 1659	Francis Goodricke		John Lambert (Note: Lambert was also elected for Pontefract, which he chose to represent. The vacancy was unfilled when the Parliament ended)	
May 1659	No representatives in the restored Rump			
1660	Sir Solomon Swale, Bt		Francis Goodricke	
1673	Sir Solomon Swale, Bt		Sir John Reresby, Bt (Note: At the by-election in November 1673, the Returning Officer made a double return of Reresby and Robert Benson; the dispute was decided in Reresby's favour, and he took his seat, in April 1675.)	
1678	Ruisshe Wentworth		Sir John Reresby, Bt	
February 1679	Henry Arthington		Sir John Reresby, Bt	
May 1679	Henry Arthington		Sir Godfrey Copley, Bt (Note: Sir John Reresby was declared re-elected at the general election in February 1679 but unseated on petition, Copley being elected in his place.)	
August 1679	Sir Brian Stapylton, Bt		Sir Godfrey Copley, Bt	
1681	Sir John Reresby, Bt		Sir Godfrey Copley, Bt	
1685	Sir Michael Wentworth		Sir Roger Strickland	
1689	Sir Michael Wentworth		Christopher Tancred	
1696	Henry Fairfax (Note: Fairfax's election was voided by a resolution of the House of Commons (21 December 1696) for breaking the law in his spending on the election; the writ to hold a new election was not issued until December 1697)		Christopher Tancred	
January 1698	William Wentworth		Christopher Tancred	
July 1698	Sir George Cooke		Sir Abstrupus Danby	
1701	Robert Monckton	Whig	Cyril Arthington	
1702	Robert Monckton	Whig	William Jessop	Whig
1713	John Dawnay (Note: A petition was raised against Dawnay's election that had not been resolved by the time the Parliament was dissolved. Dawnay had also been elected for Pontefract and, not being required to choose which constituency he would represent while there was an outstanding petition against one of the elections, sat for both boroughs throughout the Parliament)		Paul Foley	
February 1715	James Stanhope (Note: Stanhope was also elected for Cockermouth, which he chose to represent, and never sat for Aldborough)	Whig	William Jessop	Whig
April 1715 by-election	William Monson		William Jessop	Whig
1722	Charles Stanhope		William Jessop	Whig
1734	Henry Pelham (Note: Pelham was also elected for Sussex, which he chose to represent, and never sat for Aldborough)	Whig	William Jessop	Whig
1735 by-election	John Jewkes	Whig	Andrew Wilkinson	Whig
1743 by-election	Nathaniel Newnham		Andrew Wilkinson	Whig
1754	William Pitt	Whig	Andrew Wilkinson	Whig
1756 by-election	Nathaniel Cholmley		Andrew Wilkinson	Whig
1765 by-election	Nathaniel Cholmley		Viscount Villiers	
1768	Hon. Aubrey Beauclerk		Andrew Wilkinson	Whig
1772 by-election	Hon. Aubrey Beauclerk		Earl of Lincoln	Tory
1774	Charles Wilkinson		Abel Smith	Tory
1777 by-election	William Baker		Abel Smith	Tory
1778 by-election	William Baker		Hon. William Hanger	
September 1780	Sir Richard Sutton, Bt (Note: Sutton was also elected for Sandwich, which he chose to represent, and never sat for Aldborough)		Charles Mellish	
November 1780 by-election	Edward Onslow		Charles Mellish	
1781 by-election	Sir Samuel Fludyer, Bt		Charles Mellish	
January 1784 by-election	Sir Samuel Fludyer, Bt		John Gally Knight	
March 1784	Richard Arden (Note: Sir Richard Arden from 1788)	Whig	John Gally Knight	
1790	Trench Chiswell		John Gally Knight	
1796	Trench Chiswell		Charles Duncombe	
1797 by-election	John Blackburn		Charles Duncombe	
1802	John Sullivan		Charles Duncombe	
1806	Henry Fynes	Tory	Gilbert Jones	Tory
1812	Henry Fynes	Tory	Henry Dawkins	Tory
1814 by-election	Henry Fynes	Tory	Henry Gally Knight	Tory
1815 by-election	Henry Fynes	Tory	Granville Harcourt-Vernon	Tory
1820	Henry Fynes	Tory	Gibbs Antrobus	Tory
1826	Clinton James Fynes Clinton	Tory	Sir Alexander Grant, Bt	Tory
1830	Clinton James Fynes Clinton	Tory	Viscount Stormont	Ultra-Tory
1831	Clinton James Fynes Clinton	Tory	Michael Thomas Sadler	Tory
1832	Constituency abolished			

== Elections ==
=== Elections in the 1830s ===
General election 1831: Aldborough
Party	Candidate	Votes	%
Tory	Clinton James Fynes Clinton	Unopposed	
Tory	Michael Thomas Sadler	Unopposed	
Registered electors		c. 80	
Tory hold			
Tory hold			

General election 1830: Aldborough
Party	Candidate	Votes	%
Tory	Clinton James Fynes Clinton	Unopposed	
Ultra-Tory	William Murray	Unopposed	
Tory hold			
Tory hold			
