= V529 Orionis =

Nova seen in 1678

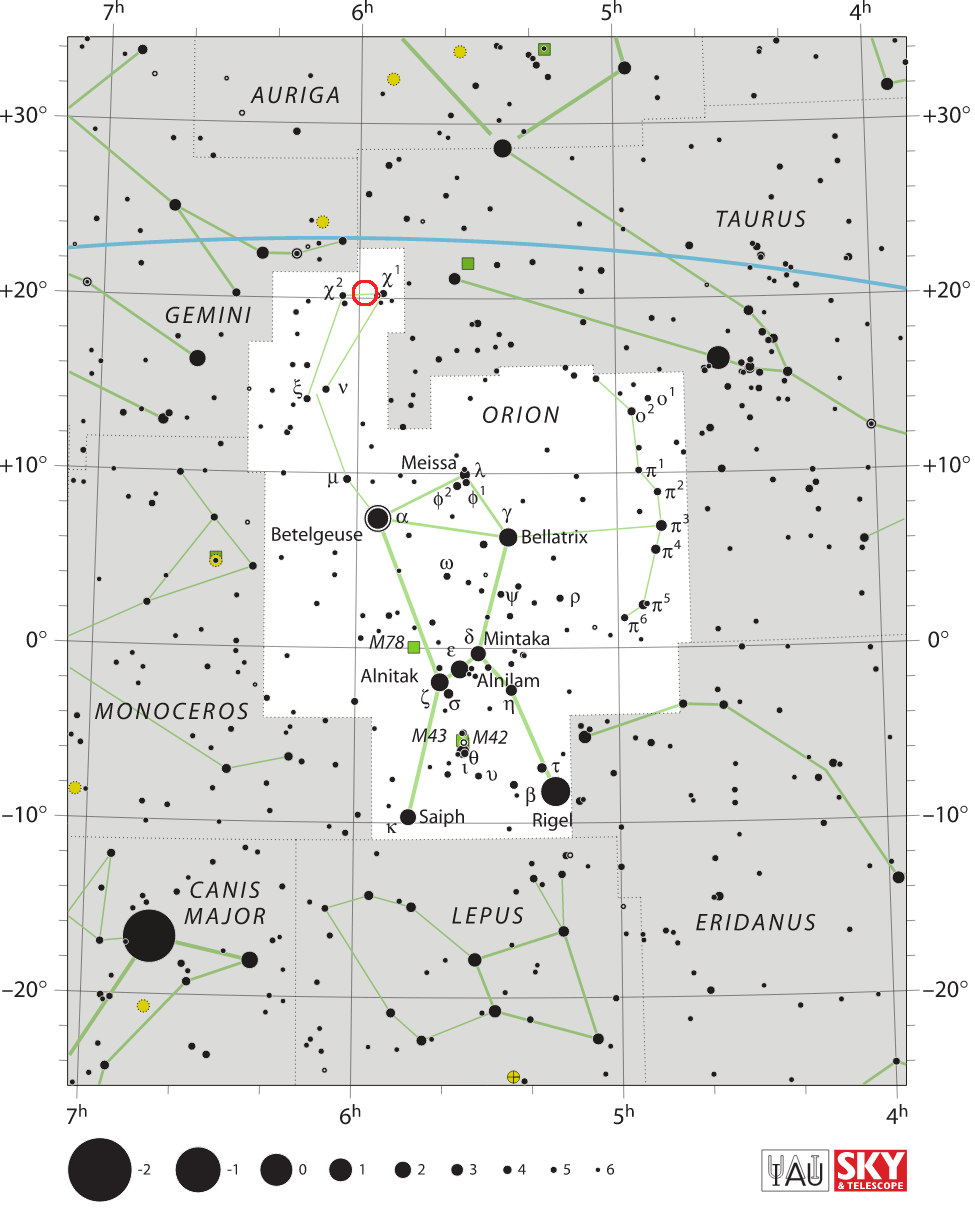
- Location of V529 Orionis (circled in red)

Observation data Epoch J2000 Equinox J2000
- Constellation: Orion
- Right ascension: 05^{h} 58^{m} 20.146^{s}
- Declination: +20° 15′ 45.35″
- Apparent magnitude (V): ~6 – 19.6

Characteristics
- Variable type: Nova?

Other designations
- Nova Ori 1678, Gaia DR2 3422837700803331584

Database references
SIMBAD	data

V529 Orionis, also known as Nova Orionis 1678, is a variable star which is usually classified as a nova. It was discovered on 28 March 1678 by Johannes Hevelius, who spotted it while observing a lunar occultation of χ^{1} Orionis, the star that forms the northernmost tip of Orion's club. Following the occultation of χ^{1} Orionis, Hevelius observed the occultation of another star by the Moon a few minutes later, which disappeared behind the first quarter Moon at 09:16 and reappeared at 10:29. Those details, combined with modern coordinates for χ^{1} Orionis, allowed Ashworth to derive coordinates, probably accurate to within a few arc seconds, for the 1678 nova.

V529 Orionis is sometimes referred to as Nova Orionis 1667 (for example the Simbad database makes this identification), but Ashworth argues against this identification and the identification of the star during an occultation makes the year unambiguous. The maximum and minimum apparent magnitudes for this star are highly uncertain, but a peak brightness of magnitude 6 (barely visible to the naked eye) and a minimum of 20 was suggested by Duerbeck.

Schmidtobreick et al. argue that the lack of emission lines usually seen in the spectra of novae makes it doubtful that V529 Orionis was a nova. They suggest it may instead be a T Tauri star, and that the actual nova observed by Hevelius may still be unidentified.
