= Theodoor Gautier Thomas Pigeaud =

Dutch lexicographer (1899–1988)

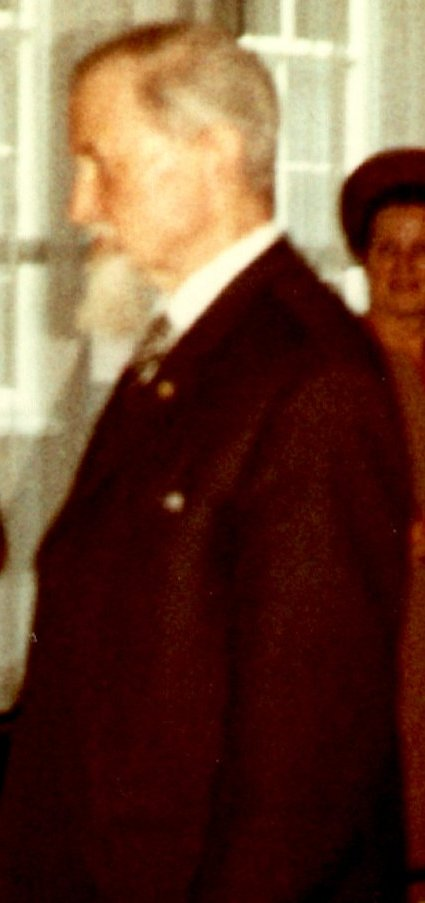
- Pigeaud at Hans Ras's promotion in 1969.
- Born: 20 February 1899; Leipzig, Saxony, Germany
- Died: 6 March 1988 (aged 89); Gouda, South Holland, Netherlands

Theodoor Gautier Thomas Pigeaud (20 February 1899 – 6 March 1988) was a German-born Dutch lexicographer and expert in Javanese literature. He especially became famous for his Javanese–Dutch dictionary (1938) that Poerwadarminto chose as the foundation of Baoesastra Djawa. Moreover, Pigeaud is also known because of his monumental study of Nagarakretagama and text catalogs of the manuscripts in the libraries of the Netherlands, Denmark, and Germany.

== Biography ==
Theodoor Gautier Thomas Pigeaud was born on 20 February 1899, in Leipzig, Germany. He was the youngest of three children of Dr. Jan Jacob Pigeaud (1862–1942), a doctor, and his wife, Adolfina Adriana Frederika Bodde (1866–1947).
