= Isaac de l'Ostal de Saint-Martin =

French botanist (1629–1696)

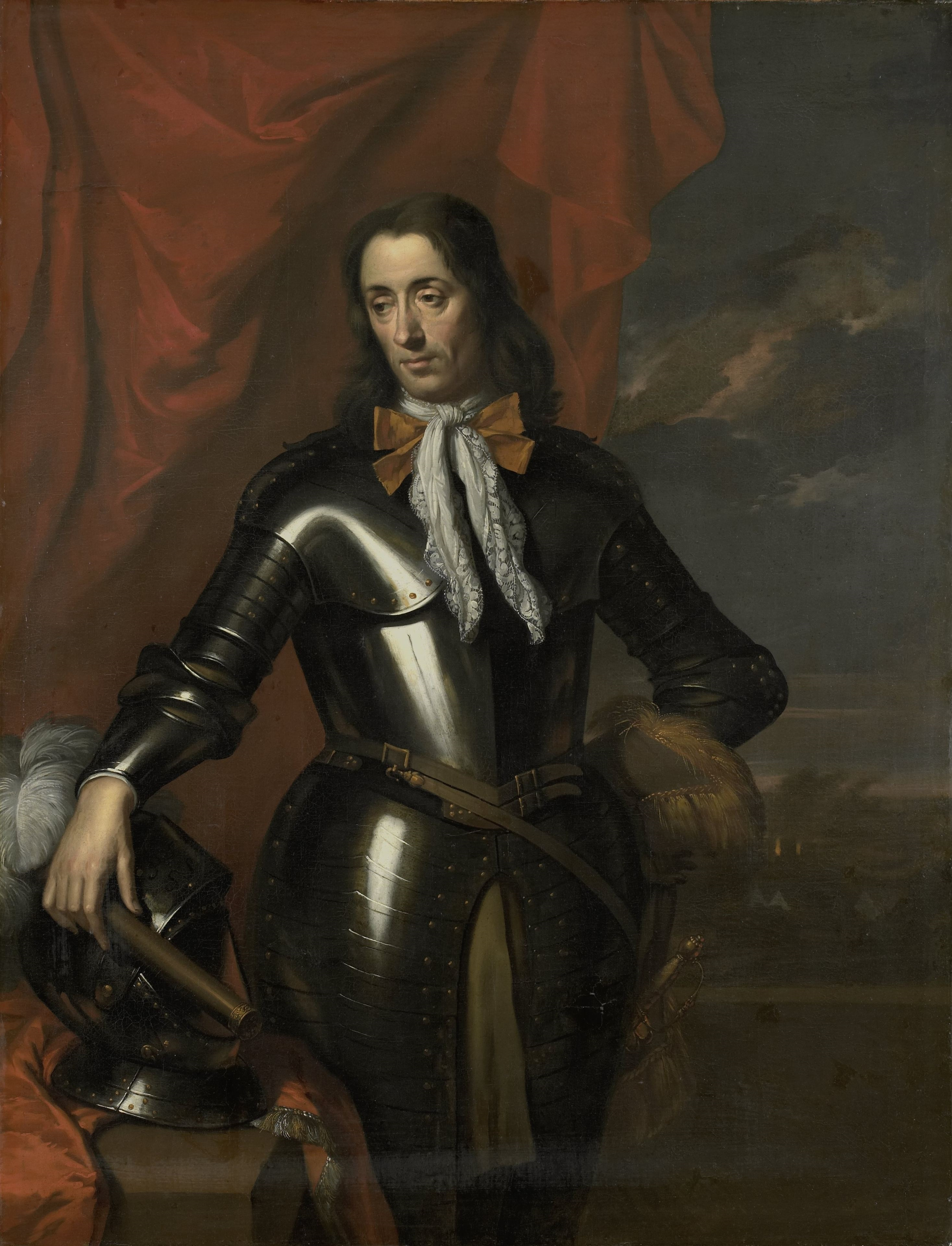
Isaac de l'Ostal de Saint-Martin, attributed to Jan de Baen.

Isaac de l'Ostal de Saint-Martin (or Lostal) (c. 1629 – 14 April 1696) was a French chevalier, who came in an unknown year from the Béarn to the Dutch Republic.

== Life ==
In 1657 he left for Batavia, after a training in the Dutch States Army, together with Hendrik van Rheede and Johan Bax van Herentals, who was appointed as governor of the Cape Colony. Till 1672 he was stationed on Ceylon and the Dutch Malabar. He served under Admiral Rijcklof van Goens in campaigns against the Portuguese on the west coast of India. He was then appointed in Batavia because of the Franco-Dutch War.

Lostal fought against the sultans in Mataram (Java), Ternate and Bantam and seems to have been a skillful soldier. His adventures were used in a playwright by Onno Zwier van Haren. Lostal lived in Utrecht from 1683 with his compagnon Hendrik van Rheede, a naturalist.

Like Van Rheede Lostal was interested in botany and a friend of Joan Huydecoper, an Amsterdam burgomaster and one of the managers of the Dutch East India Company. In 1684 he sailed again to Batavia. During his stay at Cape of Good Hope he made a trip to the north. Together with Simon van der Stel he searched for medical or economical plants (1685). A valley north of Piketberg is named after Lostal.

de Saint-Martin met the French author François-Timoléon de Choisy at the Castle of Good Hope on 5 June 1685 while the latter was on his way to Siam. de Choisy noted how close the Commissioner-General of the fort and de Saint-Martin appeared to be, considering their shared past: "More than 30 years ago, young, poor, unimportant, but brave, they embarked, musket on shoulder, on a ship going to the Indies. Since that time they have risen through the ranks to the greatest positions in the state".

When he arrived in the East he took seat as a member of the Council of India. Lostal owned three microscopes and was helping the blind Rumphius, a German botanist on Ambon Island, to get his books written and published. Lostal ordered Engelbert Kaempfer to do research on the components of Japanese rice paper.

When Lostal died in 1696 the inheritance went to his brother Gratian in Oloron, who was probably a lawyer in the Pyrénées-Atlantiques. He received 1200 books in many languages, like Hebrew, Arab, Persian and Portuguese, including Malay. Lostal was one of the first who collected such books in the Malay language. His mansion and garden in Kemayoran with a Japanese pavillon was sold to Joan van Hoorn, as foreigners (c.q. his brother) were not allowed to own property on Java.

== Sources ==
- Cribb, Robert B. / Kahin, Audrey (2004): Historical dictionary of Indonesia. Lanham, Md. : Scarecrow Press.
- Jones, Russell (1986): The Origins of the Malay Manuscript Tradition. In: Cultural contact and textual interpretation: papers from the Fourth European Colloquium on Malay and Indonesian Studies, held in Leiden in 1983 / ed. by C. D. Grijns and S. O. Robson. Dordrecht [u.a.]: Foris Publications.
- Ricklefs, M.C. (1994): A History of Modern Indonesia Since c. 1300. Stanford University Press (2. Aufl.).
