= M. C. Ricklefs =

Australian historian

Merle Calvin Ricklefs
- Born: 17 July 1943; Fort Dodge, Iowa, United States
- Died: 29 December 2019 (aged 76); Melbourne, Australia
- Occupation: Historian
- Awards: Member of the Order of Australia; Fellow of the Australian Academy of the Humanities; Centenary Medal

Academic background
- Education: Cornell University; Monash University
- Thesis: Jogjakarta under Sultan Mangkubumi (1749-1792) (1973)
- Doctoral advisor: O. W. Wolters

Academic work
- Institutions: School of Oriental and African Studies; All Souls College; Monash University; Australian National University; University of Melbourne; National University of Singapore
- Main interests: Indonesian history
- Notable works: A History of Modern Indonesia, ca. 1300 to the Present

Merle Calvin Ricklefs AM FAHA (17 July 1943 – 29 December 2019) was an American-born Australian scholar of the history and current affairs of Indonesia.

Ricklefs was born in Fort Dodge, Iowa, on 17 July 1943 and died on 29 December 2019, aged 76.

Ricklefs received his Ph.D. with his dissertation titled "Jogjakarta under Sultan Mangkubumi (1749-1792)" from Cornell University in 1973, under the supervision of O. W. Wolters. He held positions at the School of Oriental and African Studies, All Souls College, Monash University, the Australian National University and the University of Melbourne. He retired from the professorship of Southeast Asian history at the National University of Singapore. He was emeritus professor of history at both the Australian National University and Monash University.

== Academic career ==
Ricklef's publications focused on the history of Mataram, Kartasura, Yogyakarta, Surakarta (locations in Central Java). He also regularly updated his history of Indonesia, A History of Modern Indonesia, ca. 1300 to the present.

== Honours and awards ==
In 1989, Ricklefs was elected a fellow of the Australian Academy of the Humanities.

The Government of Australia awarded him in 2001 the Centenary Medal for "service to Australian society and the humanities in the study of Indonesia".

In June 2017, Ricklefs was made a member of the Order of Australia.

== Civil and human rights activity ==
In the early 1980s Ricklefs became deeply involved in education for indigenous Australians, acting as the driving force behind and co-founding the Monash Orientation Scheme for Aborigines, the first bridging program for Aboriginal people in an Australian university. This aimed to prepare Aboriginal students, who suffered from great educational disadvantage, for university study. The scheme was a runaway success and by the time Ricklefs left Monash in 1993 it had been responsible for roughly doubling the number of Aboriginal university graduates.

Ricklefs was also involved in the 1980s 'immigration debate' in Australia, which was sparked when his counterpart at the University of Melbourne, Geoffrey Blainey, argued that Australia should limit Asian immigration.

== Publications ==
Sole-authored books

- Jogjakarta under Sultan Mangkubumi, 1749–1792: A history of the division of Java. New York: Oxford University Press, 1974.
  - Yogyakarta di bawah Sultan Mangkubumi, 1749-1792: Sejarah pembagian Jawa. Transl. Hartono Hadikusumo & E. Setiyawati Alkhatab. Ed. Revianto Budi Santosa. (Revised Indonesian edition of Jogjakarta under Sultan Mangkubumi.)
- Modern Javanese historical tradition: A study of an original Kartasura chronicle and related materials. London: School of Oriental and African Studies, 1978.
- A history of modern Indonesia, ca. 1300 to the present. Basingstoke: Macmillan Press, 1993.
- War, culture and economy in Java, 1677–1726: Asian and European imperialism in the early Kartasura period. Sydney: Asian Studies Association of Australia in association with Allen & Unwin, 1993.
- The seen and unseen worlds in Java, 1726–49: History, literature and Islam in the court of Pakubuwana II. New South Wales: Asian Studies Association of Australia in association with Allen & Unwin and University of Hawaii Press, 1998.
- Mystic Synthesis in Java: A History of Islamization from the Fourteenth to the Early Nineteenth Centuries. EastBridge, 2006.
- Polarizing Javanese Society: Islamic and Other Visions (c. 1830–1930). University of Hawaii Press, 2007.
- Islamisation and Its Opponents in Java: A Political, Social, Cultural and Religious History, C. 1930 to the Present. University of Hawaii Press, 2012.
- Soul Catcher: Java’s Fiery Prince Mangkunagara I, 1726-95. NUS Press, 2018.

Co-authored book

- Indonesian manuscripts in Great Britain: A catalogue of manuscripts in Indonesian languages in British public collections by M. C. Ricklefs and P. Voorhoeve. London Oriental Bibliographies, vol. 5.
- Indonesian manuscripts in Great Britain: A catalogue of manuscripts in Indonesian languages in British public collections; New edition with addenda et corrigenda by M.C. Ricklefs, P. Voorhoeve† and Annabel Teh Gallop. Jakarta:

Co-authored and edited books

- A New History of Southeast Asia. Palgrave Macmillan, 2010.

Edited and translated book

- Pantheism and monism in Javanese suluk literature: Islamic and Indian mysticism in an Indonesian setting
