= Dutch–Mataram conflicts =

Series of conflicts in Java

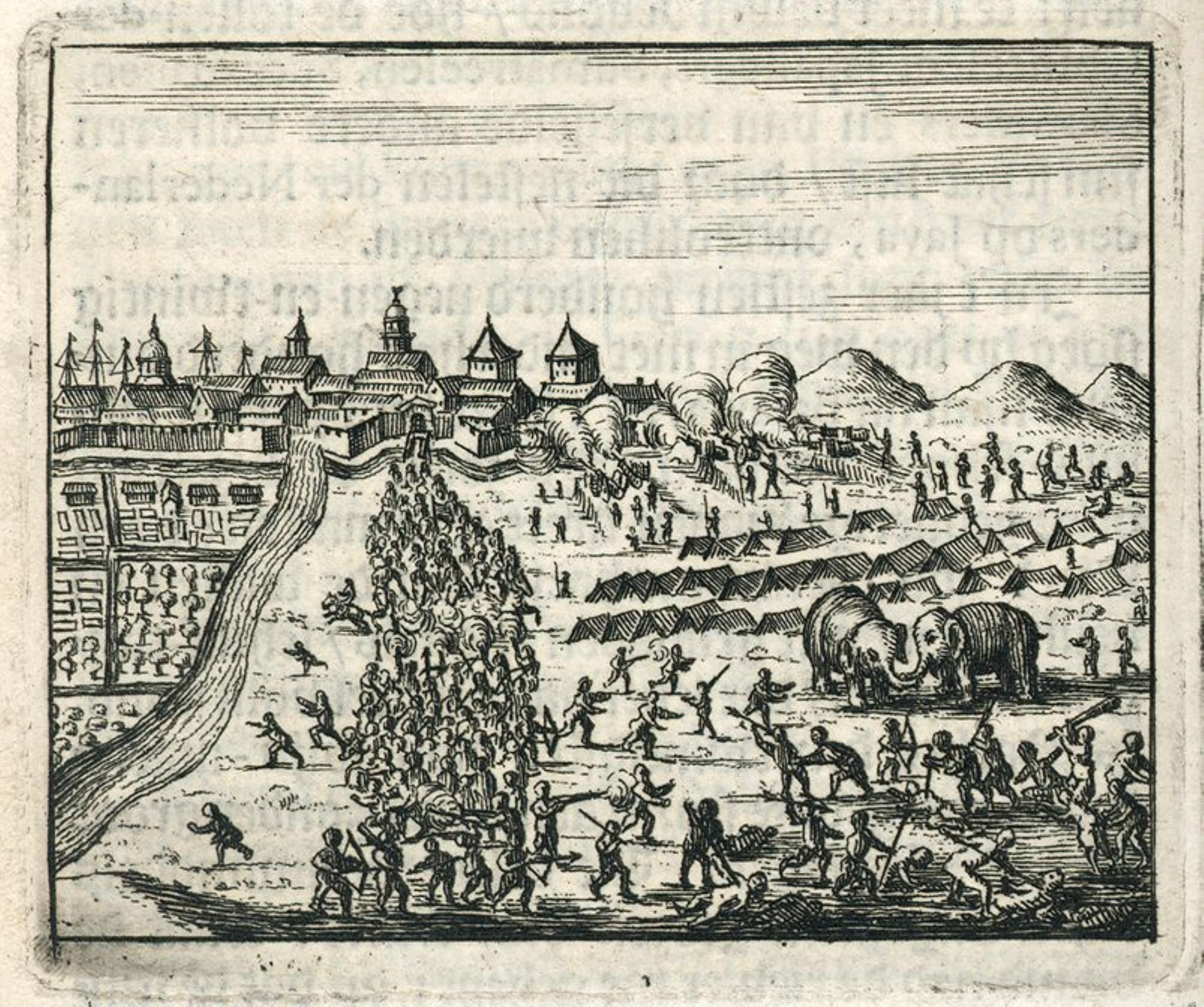
- Mataram siege of Batavia, 1628. (1680s print)
Date	1628–1757 (129 years)
Location	Java
Result	Dutch victory; Fall of Mataram Sultanate
Territorial changes	Mataram is divided into two kingdoms and one principality: Yogyakarta Sultanate; Surakarta Sunanate; Mangkunegaran

Belligerents
Mataram Sultanate; Anti-Dutch rebels	Dutch East India Company (VOC); Pro-Dutch factions

Commanders and leaders
Sultan Agung; Amangkurat II #; Untung Surapati †; Amangkurat III; Tan Kee Wie †; Panji Margono †; Singseh (POW); Pakubuwana II (Note: Until the end of 1741; during the Java War (1741–1743). Pakubuwono II decided to surrender and turn to help the Dutch after Pakubuwana II's siege of Semarang was defeated.); Hamengkubuwana I (Note: Until 1752; during the Third Javanese War of Succession. This was caused by a dispute with Prince Sambernyawa.); Mangkunegara I (surrendered)	Jan Pieterszoon Coen #; Pakubuwana I; François Tack †; Bartholomeus Visscher; Hugo Verijsel; Pakubuwana II (Note: Since the beginning of 1741) #; Cakraningrat IV; Pakubuwana III; Nicolaas Haartingh; Hamengkubuwana I (Note: Since 1752)

Strength
See list: 10,000 (1628); 14,000 (1629); 23,500 (1741–1743)	See list: 500–800 (Note: including mercenaries from Japan, China, India, Africa, Maluku Islands, Sulawesi, and Java) (1628); 46,000 (1704–1708); 3,400 (1741–1743)

Casualties and losses
- unknown

The Dutch–Mataram conflicts, also called the Dutch–Mataram wars, were military and political conflicts fought in Java from 1628 to 1757 between the Mataram Sultanate and the forces of the Dutch East Indies Company. The conflicts began due to trade competition. Over time, it included rivalries for political power and control over the throne in Mataram.

== Background ==
The conflict began when the Dutch East India Company arrived and sent ambassadors to trade as well as build lodges and forts on the North Coast of Mataram. This was rejected by the Sultan Agung, and started conflicts. During the Military campaign in Surabaya, Sultan Agung used and manipulated the Dutch East India company (VOC) to help him fight against Surabaya and its alliance. After completing the conquest of Surabaya, the sultan sent his ambassador to Batavia to broker a conditional peace treaty, but was rejected by the VOC.

== Course of conflicts ==
=== Siege of Batavia (1628–1629) ===
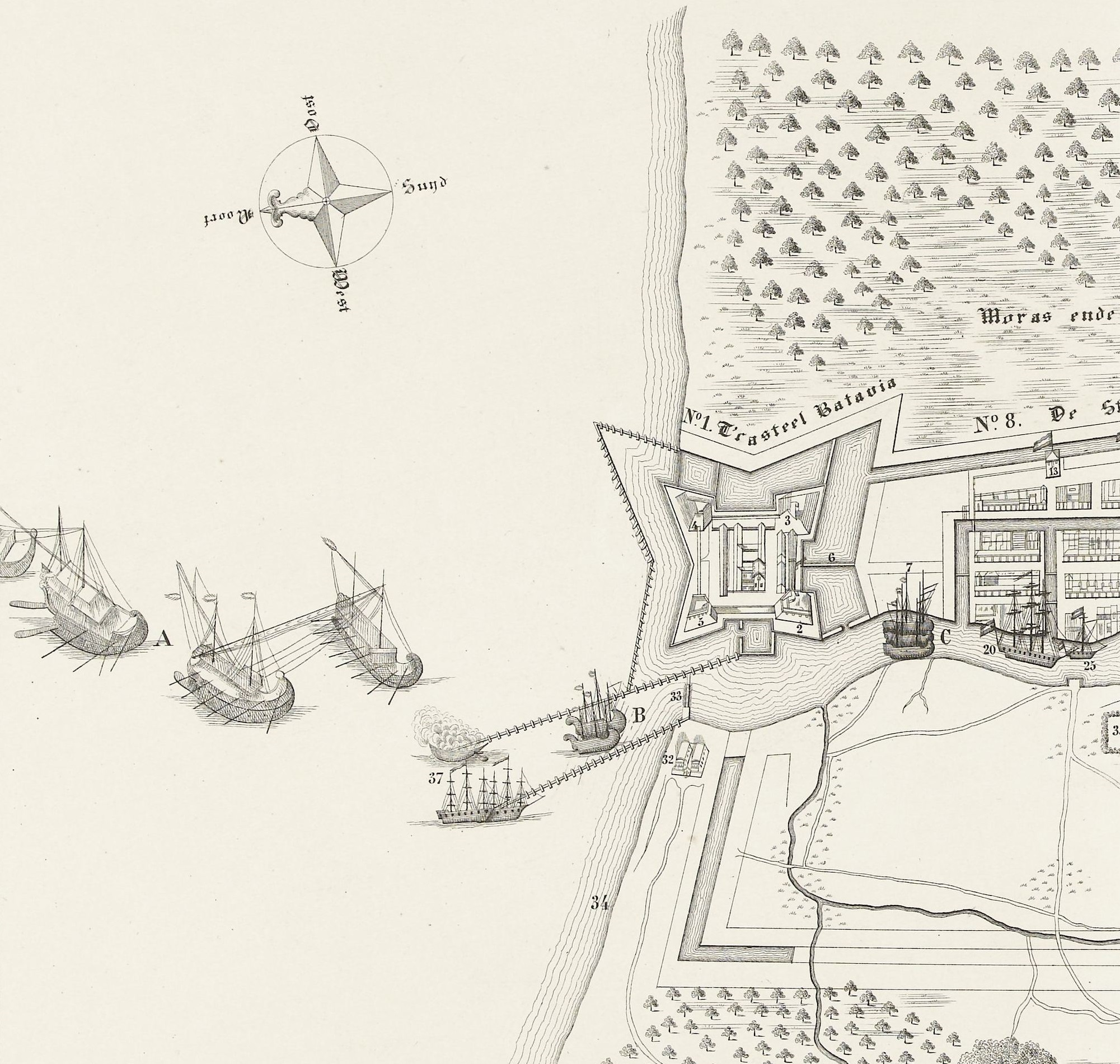
Mataram ships when they invaded Batavia

In the first attack, Bahureksa's fleet carried 150 head of cattle, 5,900 sacks of sugar, 26,600 coconuts and 12,000 sacks of rice to transfer to the Dutch. The Dutch realized this and created a line of defense. After many ships had beached, they invaded Batavia assisted by a second army in October led by Mandurareja. These attacks failed and, Bahureksa and Mandurareja were executed in Batavia by executioners sent by Sultan Agung in December 1628.

The second attack was carried out in May 1629. The first army was led by Adipati Ukur and the second army was led by Adipati Juminah. This time, Mataram prepared rice supplies in Karawang and Cirebon. Dutch spies had been utilized and located Mataram's supplies and destroyed them so that Mataram troops were weakened and defeated. By the end of the battle, they succeeded in damming and polluting the Ciliwung River, causing Jan Pieterszoon Coen to die from Cholera.

=== Untung Surapati rebellion ===
==== Battle of Kartasura (1686) ====
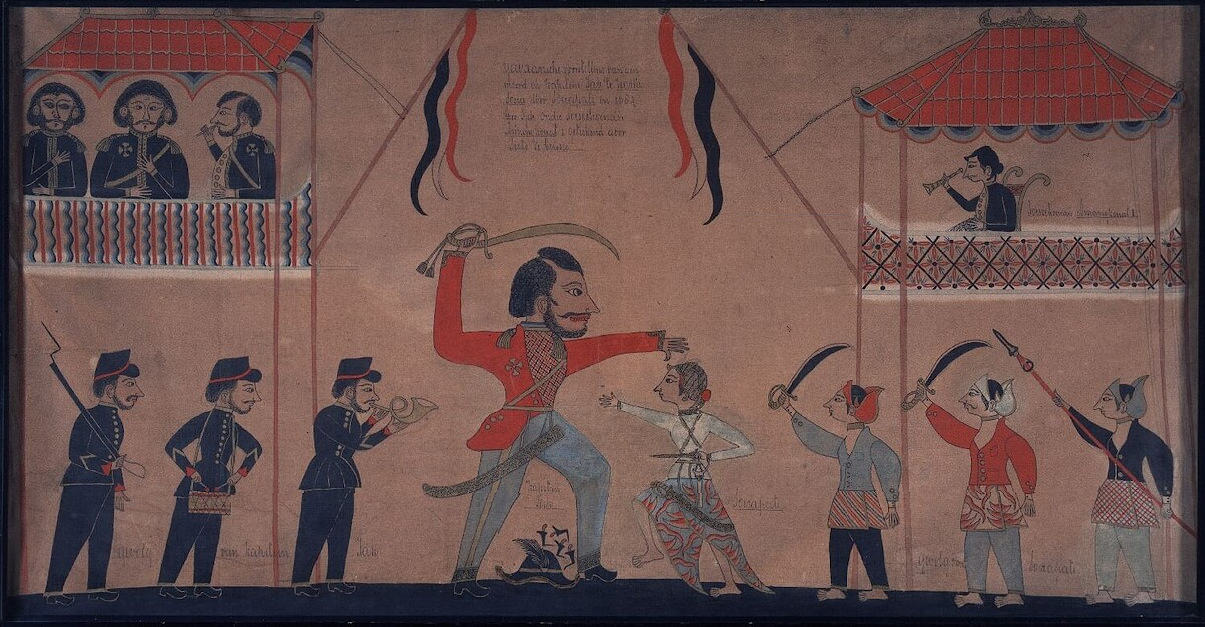
19th century depiction of the murder of François Tack in Kartasura

After his escape from slavery, Untung Suropati joined the rebel forces, becoming famous for acts and bravery in combat against the Dutch East India Company. In 1686, the VOC sent Captain François Tack to capture Suropati to Kartasura to convince Amangkurat II to deliver Surapati to him. Suropati was considered a major threat to the stability of the VOC power in Java. When Tack arrived there, Tack said that he was a soldier from Amangkurat who attacked Untung Surapati's residence.

The attack was carried out secretly, because Amangkurat II had no intention of releasing Surapati, who was considered a valuable ally. Tack and 74 other people were finally killed by Surapati's troops. The remaining VOC troops withdrew to the Dutch garrison or troops in Kartasura. Surapati then left Kartasura and went to Pasuruan.

==== Attack on Pasuruan ====
In 1690, Amangkurat II pretended to send troops to seize Pasuruan. Dutch troops failed because the battle was only an attempt to deceive the VOC.

=== First Javanese War of Succession (1704–1708) ===
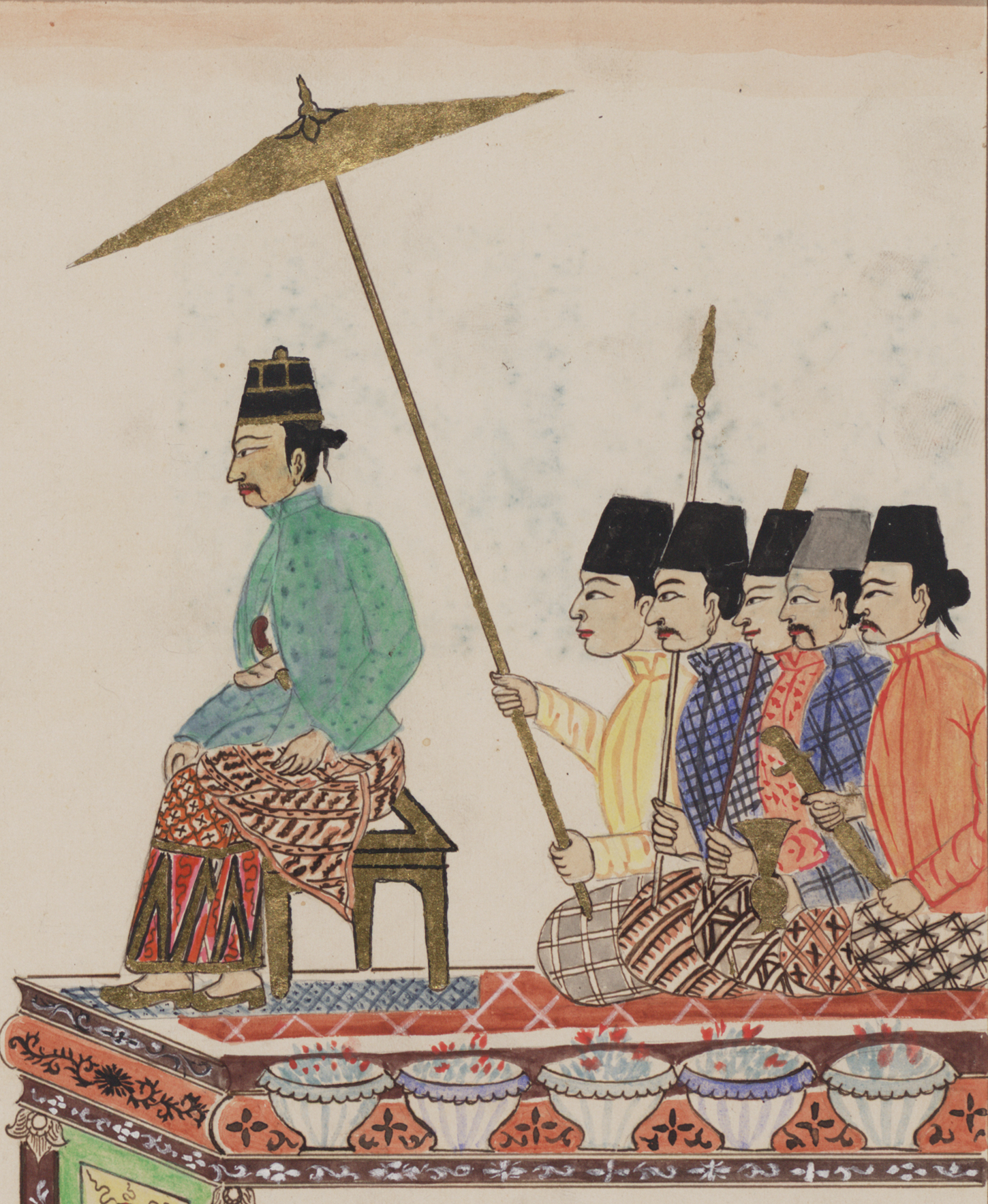
c. 1890 painting of Amangkurat III

When the Trunajaya rebellion occurred, the capital of Mataram, Plered, was destroyed. The capital was then moved to Kartasura. Amangkurat II, son of Amangkurat I and grandson of Sultan Agung, persuaded his older half-brother, Prince Puger, (Note: (Pakubuwana I)) to come with him in Kartasura, then Prince Puger refused and the conflict began. Prince Puger lost and surrendered to Jacob Couper, a VOC officer who helped Amangkurat II. Prince Puger then recognized Amangkurat II's sovereignty as Sultan and ruler of Mataram.

In 1703, Amangkurat II died and was succeeded temporarily by his son Amangkurat III. His uncle, Prince Puger, (Note: (Pakubuwana I)) fled from Kartasura to Semarang to seek support from the VOC. After receiving support and recognizing Prince Puger as Sultan, Puger went to war against his nephew. He launched a military campaign that overwhelmed Amangkurat III and left many ruins behind.

After several battles, Amangkurat III was forced to surrender and negotiate with the VOC. He handed over the Sultanate to Prince Puger and the VOC exiled him to Ceylon. The Dutch made a contract with Mataram and also had to admit that Cirebon was a Dutch protectorate.

==== Battle of Kartasura (1705) ====
In early 1705, Prince Puger's troops, assisted by mercenaries of Ambon, Banda, Makassar, Madura, and Malay attacked Kartasura. This was a major defeat for Amangkurat III. Puger's troops sacked Kartasura and there, Prince Puger entered the palace and became Sultan.

==== Battle of Pasuruan (1706) (Note: This battle was also part of Untung Surapati rebellion) ====
In October 1706, Prince Puger's troops again attacked Amangkurat III, this time in Pasuruan. They succeeded in defeating the Amangkurat troops and Untung Surapati, their learder, was killed in the battle.

=== Java War and Yellow War (1741–1750) ===
After the First and Second Javanese War of Succession, there was a riot in Batavia. This was known as Geger Pacinan, which left 10,000 Chinese traders dead and saw the Chinese expelled from Batavia.

Towards the end of October 1740, the survivors of the massacre, led by Khe Pandjang, (Note: Some sources give his name as Khe Pandjang, Que Pandjang, Si Pandjang, or Sie Pan Djiang, Setiono stated that his real name was Oie Panko.) attempted to escape to Banten, but were blocked by 3,000 troops of the Banten Sultanate. The survivors fled to the east, going to Semarang. Although Chinese Lieutenant, Kwee Yong Khoo, had warned of the possibility of an uprising was imminent, the military commander of Java, Bartholomeus Visscher, ignored the threat. The Chinese were a minority group on Java, and sought to form alliances with the Javanese, who were the largest ethnic group on the island.

The conflict began during the action in Pati (1741) and the rebels attacked the posts and houses of Dutch soldiers in Rembang, Juwana, Demak, and Jepara. This led to the VOC commander at that time becoming mentally unstable and subsequently replaced.

The rebels immediately attacked and surrounded Semarang and this put pressure on the Dutch and caused many Dutch casualties. In this situation, the Dutch were almost in a desperate state but reinforcements came and routed the rebels. Pakubuwana II left the rebels and chose to defect to the Dutch.

In the end, Pakubuwana II was considered a traitor by the Chinese-Javanese rebels. The rebels launched a successful attack on Kartasura, causing the Dutch troops and the Pakubuwana II family to withdraw from Kartasura. However, his victory did not last long. The Dutch retaliated against rebel posts in Demak and Kudus and defeated the rebels.

==== Sack in Pati (1741) ====
In 1741, a group of 37 rebels attacked the house of a Dutch corporal in Pati, killing the corporal and looting the house, stealing weapons in the process.

==== Battle of Juwana (1741) ====
On 23 May 1741, 1,000 rebel troops attacked Juwana's post in Rembang. They succeeded in defeating the Dutch and sacked the post.

==== Battle of Jepara (1741) ====
Jepara fell into the hands of the rebels after most of the territory owned by the VOC was captured. The VOC commanders and troops were unable to resist the rebel's offensive.

==== Siege of Semarang (1741) ====
Rebel forces launched an attack on the VOC's most important city, Semarang. They sent many expeditions and succeeded in bringing the rebels close to the VOC fortress in Semarang.

Reinforcements came from Cakraningrat IV and the VOC to counter the attack. The VOC forces were able to regain the Semarang area, killing many rebels. This situation made Pakubuwana II panic and he decided to turn turncoat from the rebels to the VOC.

==== Fall of Kartasura (1742) ====
After Pakubuwana II abandoned the rebels, Khe Pandjang, the leader of the Chinese rebels, attacked Kartasura leading to the biggest victory for the rebels as they were able to capture Mataram and the palace there.

Pakubuwana II's troops, numbering 2,000 men, continued to defend the city from rebels while Pakubuwana II and his family fled, cross the Bengawan Solo River. In the end, the city of Kartasura fell into the hands of the rebels.

==== Battle of Salatiga (1742) ====
VOC troops and Pakubuwana II troops cleared areas or places that were considered rebel nests, they were finally trapped in Salatiga and attacked by rebels and ultimately they lost. All soldiers were captured and executed.

==== Battle of Demak and Kudus (1742) ====
In the end, VOC power returned and they were finally able to repel and defeat the rebels. They attacked Demak and Kudus which eventually returned to the VOC and also ended the rebellion.

==== Battle of Surakarta (1747) (Note: This battle was not part of the Java War or the Yellow War. This battle was the background for the Third Javanese War of Succession) ====
In 1747, troops led by Prince Mangkubumi (Note: (Hamengkubuwana I)) attacked Surakarta with 13,000 troops. They managed to defeat the VOC and get Surakarta, at that time the VOC was in the worst situation.

=== Third Javanese War of Succession (1749–1757) ===
After the Chinese–Javanese rebellion, Mataram suffered major financial loss as well as the loss of territory including Demak and Semarang. The war of succession continued when Gustaaf Willem baron van Imhoff's or treatment towards Prince Mangkubumi (Note: (Hamengkubuwana I)) became bolder. This made the prince rebel against the Dutch. This movement was also supported by Prince Sambernyawa, (Note: (Mangkunegara I)) his cousin and a soldier.

After the appointment of Raden Mas Suryadi as Pakubuwana III, a split in the royal court caused a war for the throne to take place. Military campaigns were launched in Surakarta and Demak as a result. This caused serious divisions in Mataram and ended with the Treaty of Giyanti, which separated the Mataram region.

==== Battle of Surakarta (1750) ====
Mangkubumi attacked Surakarta and the VOC again in 1750, managing to capture several posts, causing many casualties on the VOC side.

==== Battle of Grobogan (1750) ====
In 1750, Mangkubumi's troops attacked Grobogan. This time, the VOC suffered a humiliating loss.

==== Battle of Demak (1750) ====
Sambernyawa's troops attacked the VOC again in Demak where the VOC were defeated.

==== Battle of Bogowonto (1750) ====
Mangkubumi and Sambernyawa troops attacked the VOC on the Bogowonto River, a successful attack which resulted in heavy losses for the VOC.

== Aftermath ==
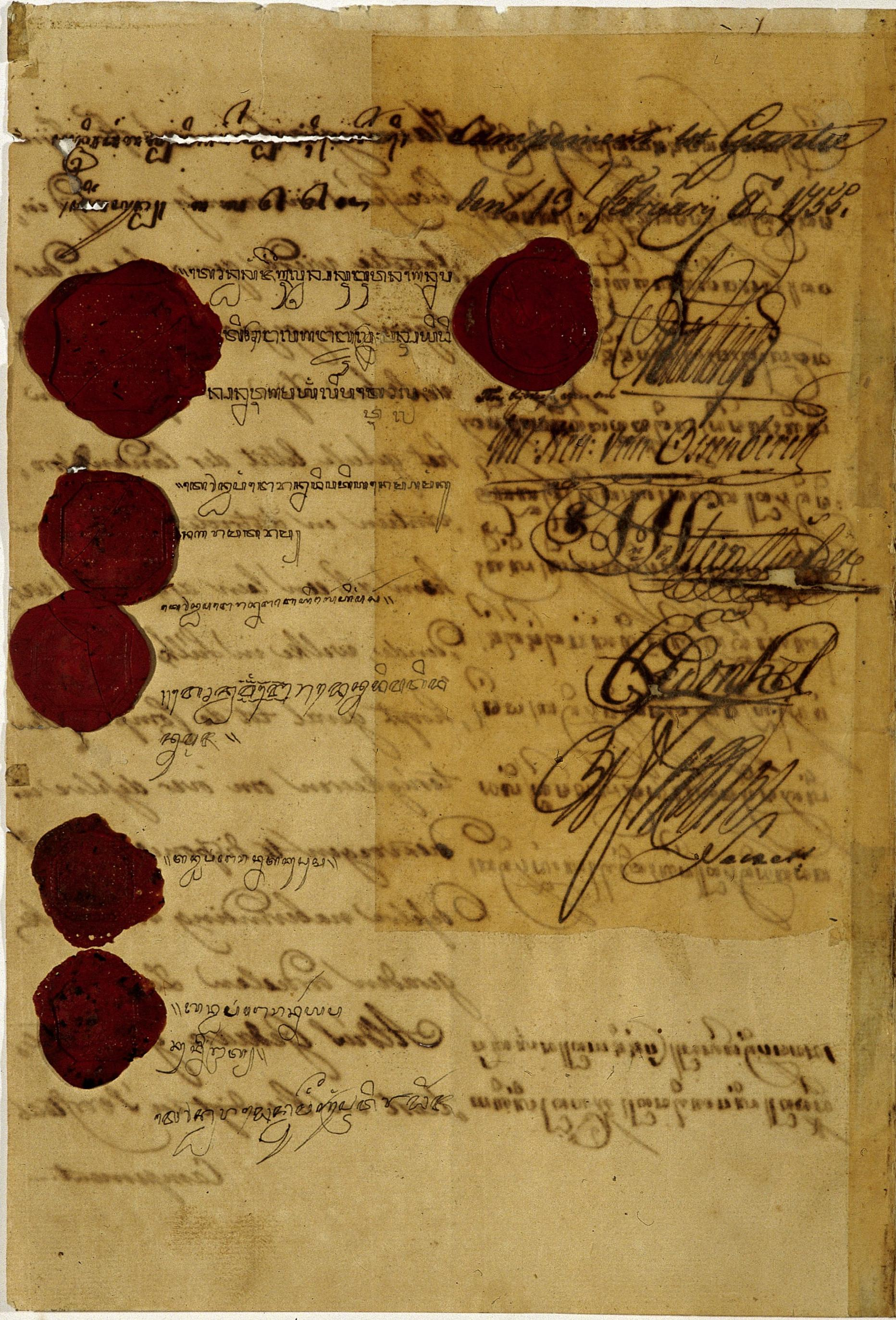
The Giyanti Agreement text is signed and stamped by the parties involved

In the end, Mataram lost all battles against the VOC causing many areas to fall into the hands of the VOC.

This conflict caused Mataram to collapse and suffer major losses. The Giyanti Agreement was signed, heavily favoring the VOC, and showed the VOC's supremacy and power in the archipelago.
