= Singseh =

Javanese rebel leader

Singseh, also known as Sing Seh, was an Indo-Chinese 18th-century rebel leader who fought against Dutch East Indian government during the Java War. The rebellion ended in failure, and Singseh was exiled to Sri Lanka, where he remained until the end of his life.

== Biography ==
=== Origin ===
Singseh is recorded as being of Chinese heritage. Prior to becoming a rebel, he was noted to have been a leader of the Chinese community in Demak on the island of Java.

=== Java War ===
==== Rising tensions ====
During the formation (through conquest and colonization) of the Dutch East Indian colony of Batavia in the 17th century, Dutch authorities decided to invite artisans from China to Indonesia. Over the next century, Chinese communities were formed across the islands Sumatra and Java. The Chinese population of the colony grew increasingly wealthy, but by the early 18th-century resentment had started to grow between the Chinese and native people of Indonesia. This was most visible in Batavia, where in the 1730s the Dutch authorities began to pass laws restricting the rights of the Chinese. The Chinese population of Batavia began protesting these actions, resulting in a further crackdown by the Dutch.

In 1740, the Dutch governor-general of Java, Adriaan Valckenier, ordered the deportation or killing of all Chinese (around 10,000 people) in Batavia. This order resulted in the 1740 Batavia massacre, during which thousands of Chinese were killed. However, a group of Chinese under the leadership of Khe Pandjang fled to Java, where they formed a rebel army to fight against Dutch authorities on the island.

==== War ====
As word of the massacre in Batavia spread, Chinese communities throughout Java began to mobilize for war. In central Java, leaders (including Singseh) from several Chinese settlements met in Demark to discuss plans for an expulsion of the Dutch from Java. It was agreed that the Chinese would form alliances with local rulers, and that a new, Javanese-Chinese kingdom would be formed. According to British historian Stamford Raffles, Singseh participated in this council and was to be crowned Emperor of Java once the Dutch had been defeated.

The first year of the Java War went well for Singseh and the Chinese rebels, who were able to drive the Dutch and their allies out of Demark, Tegal, Semarang, and many parts of Central Java. However, by 1742 the tide of the war was turning against the rebels. In early 1742 Pakubuwono II, a Javanese king who had tentatively supported the Chinese, surrendered to the Dutch. Khe Pandjang and his army succeeded in seizing Pakubuwono's capital of Kartosuro, but the king's defection left Singseh and his army trapped in North-central Java. By June 1842, Singseh was in command of 4000 men in Demark; however, he was quickly surrounded by pro-Dutch Javanese forces, and in late July was defeated in battle. Singseh and his forces fled east, arriving in the rebel-controlled city of Surabaya, where they were besieged by a Dutch army.

Following the defeat of Khe Pandjang's forces in Southern Java in December 1742, Singseh began negotiating with the Dutch. The Dutch offered amnesty for any Chinese involved in the rebellion, and thus Singseh and his army surrendered in February 1743; this surrender marked the end of the Java War. Singseh was taken into Dutch custody and exiled to Sri Lanka, where he later died.
