= Cakraningrat IV =

Madurese prince

Cakraningrat IV was a ruling prince (1718-1745) from West Madura, and a member of the Cakraningrat dynasty which was the subordinate ruler of the Mataram Sultanate.

During his reign, he tried to expand his authority to include all Madura Island and East Java region. He alternated alliances with Mataram and the Dutch East India Company, and even separately battled the two forces in an effort to realize his goal. However, in 1746 he lost the final war against Mataram which then had allied with the Company, and he was later banished to the Cape of Good Hope until his death.

From then on, the West Madura region was ceded over by Mataram to the Dutch East India Company as an exchange for the costs of the war. His son, Cakraningrat V, was put in his place as the Company's vassal.

== Family tree ==
Cakraningrat dynasty

Raden Lembu; Peteng
Arya Menger
Arya Pratikel
Arya Pojok	daughter
Ki Demung
Ki Pragalba r. ?-1531
Raden; Pratanu r. 1531-1592/6
Raden Kara r. 1592/6-1621	Pangeran Mas r. 1621-1624
Cakraningrat I r. 1624-1648
Cakraningrat II r. 1648-1707
Cakraningrat III r. 1707-1718	Cakraningrat IV r. 1718-1745
Cakraningrat V r. 1745-1770
Cakraningrat VI r. 1770-1780	Cakraningrat VII r. 1780-1815
Cakraningrat IX r. 1847-1862	Cakraningrat VIII r. 1815-1847
Cakraningrat X r. 1862-1882	Cakraningrat XI r. 1882-1905
Suryanegara r. 1905-1918	Cakraningrat XII r. 1918-1945
Cakraningrat XIII r. 1948-1956	Muhammad; Ruslan r. 1956-1957

== See also ==
- Java War (1741–1743)

Preceded by Cakraningrat III	Prince of West Madura; 1718–1745 CE	Succeeded by Cakraningrat V
