= Java War (1741–1743) =

Armed struggle against Dutch colonialism

- Part of a series of struggles against the Dutch colonial government
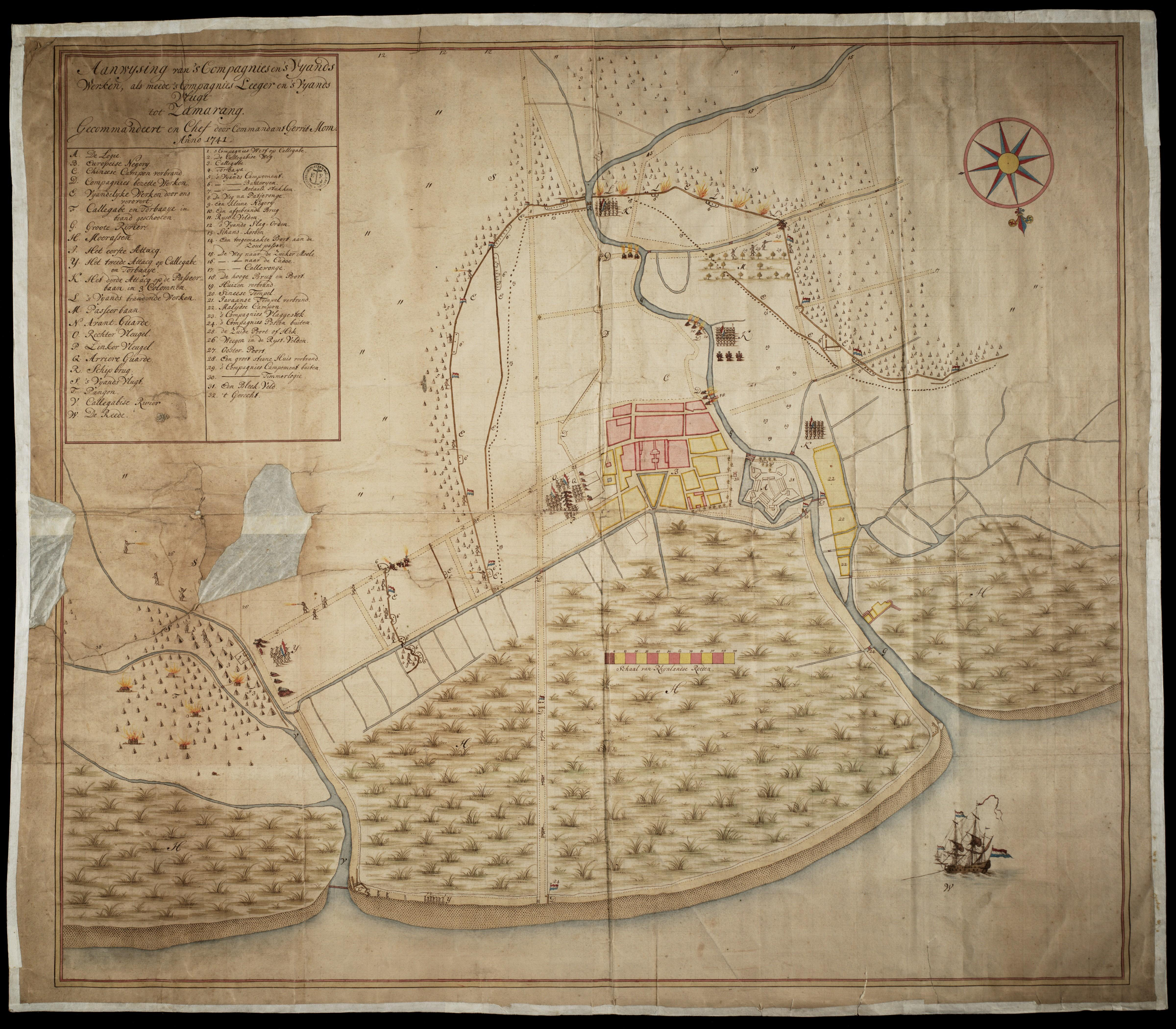
- A map showing the situation in Semarang. The fort (center) was surrounded by Chinese and Javanese troops.
Date	c. 1 February 1741 to early 1743
Location	Java
Result	Dutch Victory

Belligerents
Joint army of Chinese and Javanese	Dutch East India Company officers and assorted groups

Commanders and leaders
Singseh (POW); Khe Pandjang; Pakubuwono II (1741); Notokusumo (POW); Amangkurat V	Bartholomeus Visscher; Hugo Verijsel; Cakraningrat IV; Pakubuwono II (1742–1743)

Strength
23,500 (highest)	3,400 (highest)

The Java War of 1741 to 1743 was an armed struggle by a joint Chinese and Javanese army against the Dutch East India Company and pro-Dutch Javanese that took place in central and eastern Java. Ending in victory for the Dutch, the war led to the fall of the Sultanate of Mataram and, indirectly, the founding of both the Sunanate of Surakarta and the Sultanate of Yogyakarta.

Following years of growing anti-Chinese sentiment, Dutch forces massacred 10,000 ethnic Chinese in Batavia (now Jakarta) in October 1740. A group of survivors led by Khe Pandjang fled east for Semarang. Despite being warned of the impending uprising, the head of the Dutch East India Company's military, Bartholomeus Visscher, ignored his advisers and did not prepare reinforcements. As the situation developed, the court of Pakubuwono II, Sunan of Mataram, decided to tentatively support the Chinese while seemingly helping the Dutch.

After the first casualties on 1 February 1741 in Pati, Chinese insurgents spread through central Java, joining forces with the Javanese while staging sham battles to convince the Dutch that the Javanese were supporting them. As the deception became increasingly obvious and the Chinese drew closer to Semarang, Visscher became mentally unstable. After capturing Rembang, Tanjung, and Jepara, the joint Chinese and Javanese army besieged Semarang in June 1741. Prince Cakraningrat IV of Madura offered his alliance, and worked from Madura westward, killing any Chinese he and his troops could find and quashing the rebellion in eastern Java.

In late 1741, the siege around Semarang was broken as Pakubuwono II's army fled once it became apparent that the Dutch, with their reinforcements, had superior firepower. The Dutch campaign throughout 1742 led Pakubuwono II to surrender and switch sides; as some Javanese princes wished to continue the war, on 6 April Pakubuwono II was disowned by the revolution and his nephew, Raden Mas Garendi, was chosen to be their sultan. As the Dutch recaptured cities through the northern coast of Java, the rebellion led an attack on Pakubuwono II's capital at Kartosuro, forcing the Sunan to flee with his family. Cakraningrat IV retook the city in December 1742, and by early 1743, the last Chinese had surrendered. After the war, the Dutch asserted greater control of Java through a treaty with Pakubuwono II.

== Background ==
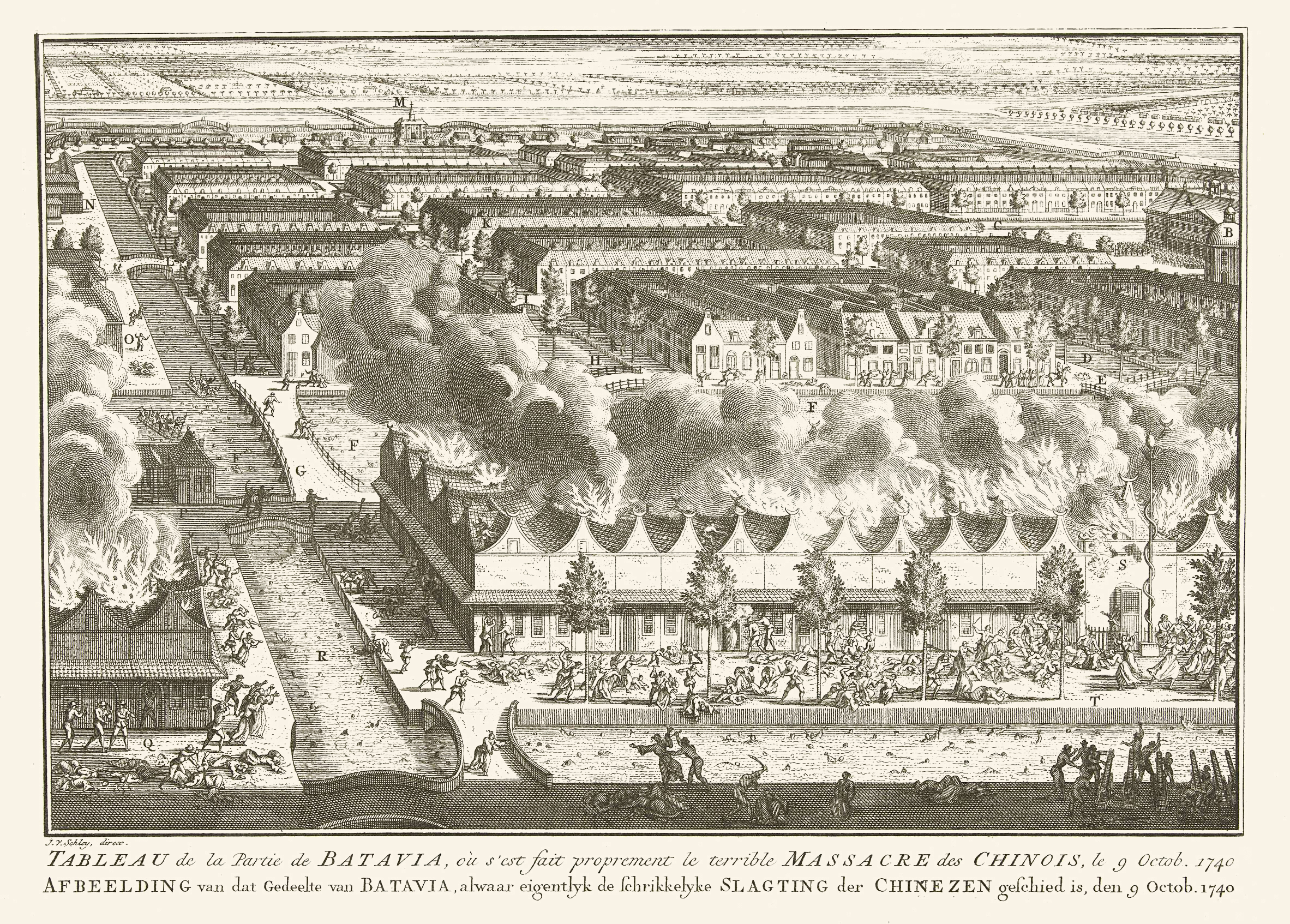
The massacre of 10,000 ethnic Chinese in Batavia was a major cause of the war.

After a long period of repression by the Dutch East India Company, ethnic Chinese in Batavia (modern day Jakarta) revolted on 7 October 1740, killing fifty Dutch troops in Meester Cornelis (now Jatinegara) and Tanah Abang. This revolt was quashed by Governor-General Adriaan Valckenier, who sent 1,800 troops, together with schutterij (militia) and eleven battalions of conscripts, to the two areas; they imposed a curfew on all Chinese inside the city walls to prevent them from plotting against the Dutch. When a group of 10,000 ethnic Chinese from nearby Tangerang and Bekasi was stopped at the gates the following day, Valckenier called an emergency meeting of the council for 9 October. The day of the meeting, the Dutch and other ethnic groups in Batavia began to kill all ethnic Chinese in the city, resulting in an estimated 10,000 deaths over two weeks.

Towards the end of October 1740, survivors of the massacre, led by Khe Pandjang, (Note: Sources spell his name alternatively as Khe Pandjang, Que Pandjang, Si Pandjang, or Sie Pan Djiang. Setiono suggests that his actual name may have been Oie Panko.) attempted to flee to Banten but were blocked by 3,000 of its sultan's troops. The survivors then fled east, towards Semarang. Despite being warned of an imminent uprising by Chinese Lieutenant Que Yonko, the military commander for Java, Bartholomeus Visscher, dismissed the threat of the incoming Chinese. A minority in Java, the Chinese began forging alliances with the Javanese, who were the largest ethnic group on the island.

== 1741 ==
=== Initial conflicts ===
On 1 February 1741, Corporal Claas Lutten was killed in his Pati home by a group of 37 Chinese insurgents armed with swords, spears, and harrows; the group then proceeded to loot his house. The insurgents were soon chased away by a group of Javanese soldiers under the command of the Regent of Kudus. Although most insurgents managed to escape, one was captured and killed, with his head being removed and staked on a pole in the middle of Semarang as a warning for other would-be insurgents. Meanwhile, in nearby Demak and Grobogan ethnic Chinese gathered in large assemblies and chose a new emperor, Singseh, and attempted to found their own nation. The success of the Javanese troops in stopping the insurgents reassured Visscher, despite Yonko's advice otherwise.

At the time, Visscher and his troops, numbering 90 able-bodied Dutchmen and 208 Indonesians, were without reinforcements (Note: At the time, Khe Pandjang's troops were still in Bekasi, between Batavia and Semarang, while in southern Sulawesi there was an ongoing war. As such, Visscher was cut off from two major Dutch strongholds.) and received conflicting advice from Yonko and his uncle, Captain Que Anko. (Note: Despite being Yonko's uncle, Anko reportedly hated him.) To secure his position, he sent a request to several local regents and leaders to capture or kill all suspicious looking Chinese; although some complied immediately, as evidenced by Visscher's receiving three heads several days later, others, such as Sunan Pakubuwono II of Mataram, were more cautious, writing that they were uncertain of the ethics of the orders.

During a period of contemplation lasting from late 1740 and July 1741, Pakubuwono II and his advisers had been debating the possible benefits of joining the Chinese or holding out and rescuing the Dutch to gain a more favourable relationship. Pakubuwono II later secretly paid 2,000 real to Mas Ibrahim to begin attacks on the Dutch East India Company and its holdings; he also commanded his senior lords Jayaningrat and Citrasoma to be neutral in the conflict, and to let as many Chinese escape as possible. Mertopuro of Grobogan, one of the more vocal advocates of active resistance, was tasked with the instigation of Chinese in his area. Within Pakubuwono II's capital at Kartosuro, he ordered the restoration of the siti inggil kidul (a kind of terrace) outside his court, thus giving him a reason to tell the Dutch that he had no manpower to spare. Despite Visscher receiving intelligence of Pakubuwono II's dealings, he trusted the Sunan due to his previous loyalty to the company.

=== Instability of Visscher and early losses ===
When the Chinese forces, numbering up to 1,000 and threatening to cut supply lines to Semarang, arrived in Tanjung in April 1741, Visscher told the regent to deal with them; however, the regent's forces stalled, refusing to move until they received a tribute of high quality rice. After Yonko sent the rice, the regent's men went to Tanjung, stood with the rebels outside of their range, then fired and left. The rebels soon occupied a sugar mill there. In Grobogan, Mertopuro, armed with weapons from the Dutch military command, staged an attack on the Chinese rebels, in which the Javanese troops opened fire on the Chinese before the Dutch came. Once the Dutch arrived, Mertopuro showed bullet wounds in horses—inflicted by his own men—as proof that he had fought.

To deal with the increasing pressure being put on by the Chinese, Visscher sent orders to company strongholds throughout the north coast to hire as many native, non-Javanese, mercenaries as could be found; he also ordered the regents of Pati, Jepara, Kudus, and Cekalsewu, then in Semarang for a military meeting, to send troops to cut off the insurgents' escape. The regents, loyal to Pakubuwono II, sent 540 troops to Tanjung, then secretly left for Kartosuro. However, when the troops arrived they feinted an attack, then pulled back to Semarang. When Visscher realized that the regents had disappeared, Pakubuwono II told him that he would send them back with a further 6,000 soldiers, requesting that Visscher secure compensation from the company headquarters in Batavia.

News soon spread of thousands of Chinese joining forces with Javanese soldiers in Grobogan, outside of Semarang. On 1 May, Visscher was accosted by Captain Rudolph Carel von Glan, a unit leader, asking why Visscher had done nothing to deal with the uprising. Visscher heatedly replied that it was not Glan's business. The following day, after being questioned by prosecutor Jeronimus Tonnemans Jr., Yonko, and Anko, Visscher became increasingly angry, breaking a table in half and yelling at his Chinese advisers. When Yonko disappeared after the meeting, Anko told Visscher that he had joined the rebelling Chinese. This caused Visscher, who had heavily invested in Yonko and had left a large amount of money with him, to take out his carriage and scream to the residents of Semarang to escape while it was still possible. This continued until he crashed into the city walls. The residents ran away from Semarang in a panic, leaving eight loaded cannons outside the city walls.

The following day, Visscher surrendered control of the military to Glan. Not long afterwards, news reached him that Yonko had not joined the insurgents but had been robbed, spending the night at his son's grave in Peterongan in depression. This revitalized Visscher, who retook command of the military on 4 May and ordered everyone to return to their homes. Several days afterwards, four regents – Suradiningrat from Tuban, Martapura from Grobogan, Suradimenggala from Kaliwungu, and Awangga from Kendal – arrived at Semarang, reporting that the 6,000 promised troops were on their way.

Despite being advised that he would be in danger if he went against the company, on 11 May Pakubuwono II requested that all coastal regents pledge their allegiance to him. He did the same for the members of his court on 13 May. However, several leaders, including second in line to the throne Prince Ngabehi Loringpasar, Pakubuwono II's elder brother Prince Tepasana, and his mother Queen Amangkurat, were against a revolution; Captain Johannes van Velsen, Dutch resident in Kartasura, reported to Visscher that the Sunan had been persuaded against rebelling. However, Pakubuwono II became increasingly certain that he would join forces with the Chinese.

On 23 May, the approximately 1,000 Chinese left Tanjung and headed east, assaulting the 15-man Juwana outpost, as well as the one in Rembang. Although the Dutch resident and five others escaped, the Dutch recorded a high number of casualties, with reports of cannibalism. The resident in Demak, hearing these rumours and with 3,000 Chinese outside the walls, requested permission to withdraw to Semarang. Considering Demak key to the defence of the city, Visscher refused, instead sending 80 to 100 native troops as reinforcements. The resident of Demak was eventually called back to Semarang, leaving the defence of the fort to Mertopuro. Rembang fell on 27 July, with Jepara falling four days later.

=== Siege of Semarang and Dutch losses ===
The Chinese from Tanjung soon reached Semarang and laid siege, assisted by the troops previously sent to destroy them. Visscher, fearing that his troops would not be enough, requested reinforcements from Pakubuwono II. Pakubuwono II agreed to send an artillery unit, but it was secretly intended to reinforce the Chinese. With expeditions from the Chinese and Javanese reaching the city walls, in early June Visscher ordered a retaliatory expedition, totalling 46 Europeans and 146 Indonesians and assisted by Javanese troops under the Governor of Semarang Dipati Sastrawijaya. This expedition was sent against the Chinese and Javanese gathering outside the hills of Bergota. Outside the walls, the Javanese soon deserted after spoiling the available artillery provisions, with the other native groups abandoning the expedition upon first contact with the Chinese. After killing several Chinese, the Dutch soldiers returned to the fortress.

The following day, the Dutch commandeered all Chinese houses, including that of Anko. When working weapons and ammunition were found in his home, Anko stated that they were remnants from an earlier war in 1718. Not believing Anko, the Dutch arrested him and Yonko, then had them chained and decapitated; Visscher then ordered the execution of all ethnic Chinese. On 14 June, Visscher ordered the Chinese quarters outside the fortress to be razed to the ground. Despite Chinese numerical superiority, they did not attempt a final attack.

With more uprisings appearing in eastern Java, the company was approached by Prince Cakraningrat IV of Madura, who offered to ally himself with the Dutch if they would support his bid to establish his own kingdom in the area; Cakraningrat IV, formerly a great warrior for Mataram, had taken offence to being left out of Pakubuwono II's earlier war deliberations and was ready to launch a war of his own against the Sunan's forces. After the Dutch agreed, Cakraningrat IV severed his ties with Mataram, returning his wife (Pakubuwono II's sister), to Kartosuro. Throughout June and July Cakraningrat IV's troops attempted to kill all ethnic Chinese, first starting in Madura then spreading to Tuban, Surabaya, Jipang, and Gresik. (Note: Sources are unclear as to the number of deaths, although in Gresik the total is estimated to be 400.) By 12 July, all Chinese in the Surabaya and Gresik areas had either escaped or been killed.

On 9 July Pakubuwono II ordered the execution of Prince Tepasana and another younger brother, accused of being informants for Velsen; their families, including Tepasana's preteen son Raden Mas Garendi, were exiled. Pakubuwono II soon afterwards openly showed his support for the Chinese rebellion in July with a sneak attack. His troops entered the Dutch garrison in Kartasura, under the pretension of helping to prepare for a Chinese attack, on 20 July. Once inside, the Javanese soldiers opened fire, surprising the Dutch; despite being caught unaware and losing thirty-five men in the initial attack, the Dutch were able to hold out for three weeks. However, after the Chinese joined the battle, the garrison soon fell, with Velsen being executed and other surviving troops being given the choice (or forced) to convert to Islam or be killed. Meanwhile, Khe Pandjang's troops were driven out of Bekasi and joined with 1,000 soldiers under the command of Captain Ismail to capture Tegal.

On 25 July, Visscher's replacement Abraham Roos—sent in late June because Visscher was considered mentally unstable—arrived in Semarang with 170 men, noting that the company only controlled the fortress, European quarters and beachhead. After Roos' arrival, the Dutch government began sending more reinforcements, eventually totalling at least 1,400 Dutch and 1,600 Indonesian soldiers. By November 1741, the company's fortress in Semarang was surrounded by 3,500 Chinese and 20,000 Javanese troops, who were armed with 30 cannons, as opposed to 3,400 Dutch and loyalist troops. With the superior Dutch firepower and tactics causing Pakubuwono II's troops to scatter, the siege was eventually broken and an expedition was able to reclaim Jepara.

== 1742–1743 ==
=== The fall of Kartosuro ===
In early 1742, Pakubuwono II capitulated to the Dutch. (Note: According to Stamford Raffles, a British explorer and scholar on the Indies, Pakubuwono II may have been driven by a fear of either Dutch retribution or Chinese military prowess.) In March, a group of seven Dutchmen led by Captain Johan Andries, Baron van Hohendorff, arrived in Kartosuro to set the terms of his surrender. Although at first the Dutch demanded the young crown prince, Prince Loringpasar, the eldest son of Prince Notokusumo, and Prince Pringgalaya as hostages, Loringpasar was replaced by Queen Amangkurat as he was too ill to make the trip.

Unwilling to let the Dutch take his son, Notokusumo, then laying siege to Semarang, made a fake attack against the Chinese, in which the sick or injured were sacrificed while the healthy were allowed to escape, in order to give an appearance of loyalty. He then went to Kartosuro to attempt to rescue his son, but was told to clear a path to Demak by the Dutch officials there. After stalling, Notokusumo agreed to do so, first travelling to Semarang. However, upon his arrival in Semarang he was arrested by the new chief of the army, Hugo Verijsel, with Pakubuwono II's blessing. Verijsel then took 300 Dutch soldiers and 500 natives to clear the area around Kartosuro, but was stopped in Salatiga when he and his troops came under attack from the armies of three temenggung; Verijsel retreated to Ampel.

For dealing with the Dutch, on 6 April Pakubuwono II was disowned by the still-fighting princes and Chinese insurgents. The rebellion leaders chose Garendi as the new sunan; Garendi took the name Sunan Kuning. On 19 June, it was reported that Notokusumo's troops, now under the command of Kyai Mas Yudanagara, had left for Kartosuro to place Sunan Kuning on the throne. On 30 June, they arrived at Kartosuro together with Khe Pandjang's troops and attacked the city. As Pakubuwono II's troops, numbering close to 2,000, stayed behind to fight, Pakubuwono II, his family, and the Dutch escaped on horseback, finding safety after crossing the Solo River. Pakubuwono II then promised that he would surrender the coastal lands and let the Dutch pick the patih, or chief minister, if the Dutch would help him reclaim his throne.

=== Dutch control is restored ===
In early July, Verijsel received 360 Ambonese troops, led by Kraeng Tanate, to aid him in the defence of Semarang. On 21 July, Captain Gerrit Mom arrived from Sulawesi with 800 troops to serve as further reinforcements. Mom and Tanate were then sent to recapture Demak, occupied by 4,000 rebels under the command of the Chinese general Singseh and Javanese general Raden Suryakusuma. The ensuing battle took place over several days and resulted in a Dutch victory.

The Dutch troops continued on to Kudus, where an estimated 2,000 Chinese soldiers were awaiting arrivals from Kartosuro. With their numbers reinforced by further troops led by Ngabehi Secanegara from Jepara and Captain Hendrik Brule from Semarang, Mom and Tanate recaptured the city without a fight on 28 August. After the recapture of Demak and Kudus, the remaining regents began to surrender, promised pardon by Pakubuwono II.

The Chinese and Javanese rebel coalition, which was beginning to unravel, continued to hold Kartosuro until December 1742, being only chased out of the city when Cakraningrat IV came and retook it. (Note: Cakraningrat IV initially attempted to establish his own kingdom and wanted Pakubuwono II executed as an example of a "faithless king", but soon returned the palace to Pakubuwono II when the Dutch threatened war. However, the relationship between the two continued to be strained.) Although the Javanese were allowed to escape unmolested, the Chinese were only able to escape to nearby Prambanan after a "pitched battle" in Asem. Two months later the Chinese, accompanied by noted Javanese leader Pakunegara, made a last stand but were defeated and forced to run to the foothills along the southern coast. A general amnesty was soon declared, and Singseh surrendered in Surabaya. (Note: After his capture, Singseh was sent to Ceylon (modern day Sri Lanka), where he spent the rest of his life.)

== Aftermath ==
Although Pakubuwono II was reinstated by the Dutch, in early 1743 he was forced to sign a treaty. Aside from moving his palace to nearby Solo, Pakubuwono II surrendered two of the Javanese leaders. As part of the conditions of the treaty, Pakubuwono II also surrendered the northern coast of Java, Madura, and eastern Java to the Dutch; the treaty also obligated him to pay 8,600 tonnes (8,500 long tons; 9,500 short tons) of rice in tribute every year and forbade the Javanese from sailing outside of Java, Madura, and Bali. Pakubuwono II died in 1749, an unpopular leader whose claim to the throne had only been held through the protection of the Dutch. Further disagreements between the court ministers and leaders after Pakubuwono II's death led to the division of Mataram into two kingdoms, the Sunanate of Surakarta located in Solo under Pakubuwono III and the Sultanate of Yogyakarta in the city of the same name under Mangkubumi.

Prince Cakraningrat IV did not receive the land or powers promised, instead being isolated to Madura. Unwilling to accept what he saw as Dutch betrayal, he joined another rebellion in 1745; after his son surrendered to the Dutch, Cakraningrat IV escaped to Banjarmasin in Borneo but was captured and exiled to the Cape of Good Hope in 1746.

The Dutch East India Company, although it had gained a large amount of coastal land, was "in an advanced state of exhaustion". According to the noted scholar of Indonesia Merle Calvin Ricklefs, the new Sultan of Yogyakarta Mangkubumi went on to be the Dutch colonial government's "most dangerous enemy of the eighteenth century".
