= Benny G. Setiono =

Indonesian historian (1943–2017)

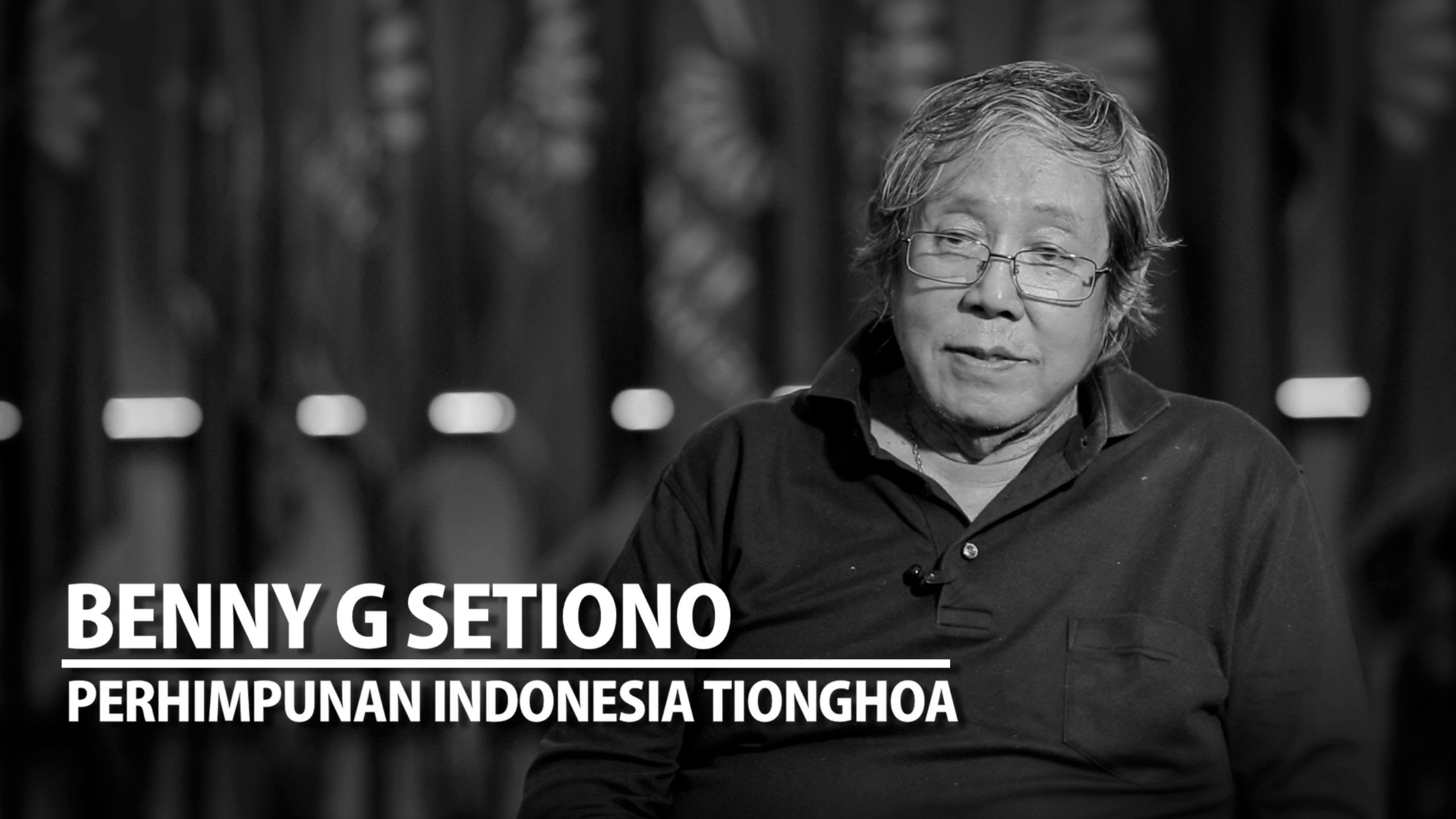
Benny G. Setiono

Benny Gatot Setiono (October 31, 1943 - January 17, 2017) was an Indonesian historian. Setiono was born in Caracas, Kuningan, West Java, Indonesia. His father, Endang Sunarko (Khouw Sin Eng), was also a writer, including of New China, Friend or Foe and for the magazines 'Pantjawarna' and `Sin Po daily '.

Setiono studied at the Faculty of Economics, Res Publica University, (now known as Trisakti University), Jakarta. At level three, Benny was forced to drop out after the campus was burned by WE / KAPPI backed militias in 1965 riots.

In 1999, Setiono co-founded the Chinese Indonesian Association, CORE, and in 2002 co-founded ELKASA. He was the author of various articles and the book Tionghoa Dalam Pusaran Politik (Chinese in the Political Turbulence) published by ELKASA, Jakarta 2003 and translated into Chinese by Prof. Zhou Nanjing from Beijing University (2004).

According to Setiono, the outbreak of conflict with the Chinese in the 18th century was followed by increased suspicion and resentment in native Indonesians and the Dutch toward the ethnic Chinese, who were growing in number and whose wealth was increasingly visible.

Established in Jakarta before Notary James Herman Rahardjo on February 5, 1999, INTI (Perhimpunan Indonesia Tionghoa) organization was founded by Aswan Sjachril, Benny G. Setiono, Eddie Lembong, Effie Sari, Gilbert Wiryadinata, Hendra Surjana, Henry Boen, Judi W. Leonardi, Kahar Lukman, Karta Winata, Kuncoro Wibowo, Michael Utama Purnama, Nancy Widjaja, Ronald Sjarif, Sudhamek Agoeng Waspodo Soenjoto, Teddy Sugianto, and Tjiandra Widjaja Wong.

Spouse: Kumala Dewi Ismail (Baby) (†)

Children: Widuri (Uchen)/ Christiandy K, Nilam (Uching)/ Venny Sufendi, Eddy (Afen)/ Rindu Wastuti, Mirah (Maria), Intan (Noreen)/ Willy Cendana,

Siblings: Heru Sunarko (†)/ Betsy L, Sri Lestari Sunarko/ Trianus G (†), Sari Lestari Sunarko (†)/ Slamet Hadi, Buntaran Sunarko (†), Bambang Sunarko/ Ruth Zacharias, Aditya Sunarko/ Lisa Atmadja,

Grandchildren: Ferdinand Dharmadi/ Veronica Pribadi , Julius Dharmadi, Shela Tanado, Ario Tanado, Davin Putera Cendana, Deandra Puteri Cendana, Divara Puteri Cendana, Faith Ruby Susantio, Junaid Susantio, Averian Iskandar, Lakeisha Iskandar,

Great grandchildren: Claire Olivia Carsten
