= 1740 Batavia massacre =

Pogrom of ethnic Chinese in the Dutch East Indies

Batavia massacre
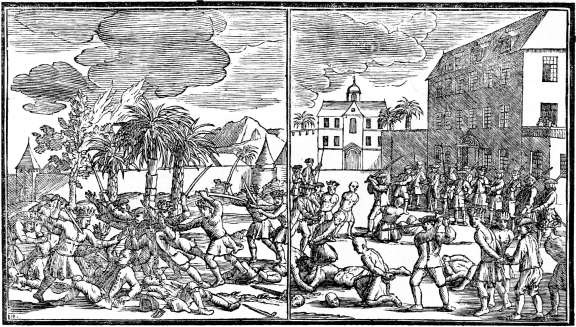
- Chinezenmoord, Unknown author
- Date: 9 October – 22 November 1740
- Location: Batavia, Dutch East Indies; 6°7′51″S 106°47′57″E
- Methods: Pogrom
- Result: See § Aftermath

Parties
Dutch East India Company and allies	Chinese Indonesians

Lead figures
Adriaan Valckenier (Dutch East India Company)	Nie Hoe Kong

Casualties and losses
500 soldiers killed	>10,000 killed; >500 wounded

1740 Batavia massacre
- Traditional Chinese: 紅溪慘案
- Simplified Chinese: 红溪惨案
- Literal meaning: Red River tragedy/massacre
Transcriptions
Standard Mandarin
- Hanyu Pinyin: Hóng Xī cǎn'àn
- Wade–Giles: Hung^{2} Hsi^{1} ts'an^{3}-an^{4}
- IPA: [xʊ̌ŋ ɕí tsʰàn.an]

A massacre and pogrom of ethnic Chinese residents of the port city of Batavia (present-day Jakarta) in the Dutch East Indies was carried out by the Dutch East India Company and allied members of other Batavian ethnic groups in 1740. The violence in the city lasted from 9 until 22 October, with minor skirmishes outside the walls continuing late into November that year. Historians have estimated that at least 10,000 ethnic Chinese were massacred; just 600 to 3,000 are believed to have survived.

In September 1740, as unrest rose among the Chinese population, spurred by government repression and declining sugar prices, Governor-General Adriaan Valckenier declared that any uprising would be met with deadly force. On 7 October, hundreds of ethnic Chinese, many of them sugar mill workers, killed 50 Dutch soldiers, leading Dutch troops to confiscate all weapons from the Chinese populace and to place the Chinese under a curfew. Two days later, rumors of Chinese atrocities led other Batavian ethnic groups to burn Chinese houses along Besar River and Dutch soldiers to fire cannons at Chinese homes in revenge. The violence soon spread throughout Batavia, killing more Chinese. Although Valckenier declared an amnesty on 11 October, gangs of irregulars continued to hunt down and kill Chinese until 22 October, when the governor-general called more forcefully for a cessation of hostilities. Outside the city walls, clashes continued between Dutch troops and rioting sugar mill workers. After several weeks of minor skirmishes, Dutch-led troops assaulted Chinese strongholds in sugar mills throughout the area.

The following year, attacks on ethnic Chinese throughout Java sparked the two-year Java War that pitted ethnic Chinese and Javanese forces against Dutch troops. Valckenier was later recalled to the Netherlands and charged with crimes related to the massacre. The massacre figures heavily in Dutch literature, and is also cited as a possible etymology for the names of several areas in Jakarta.

== Background ==
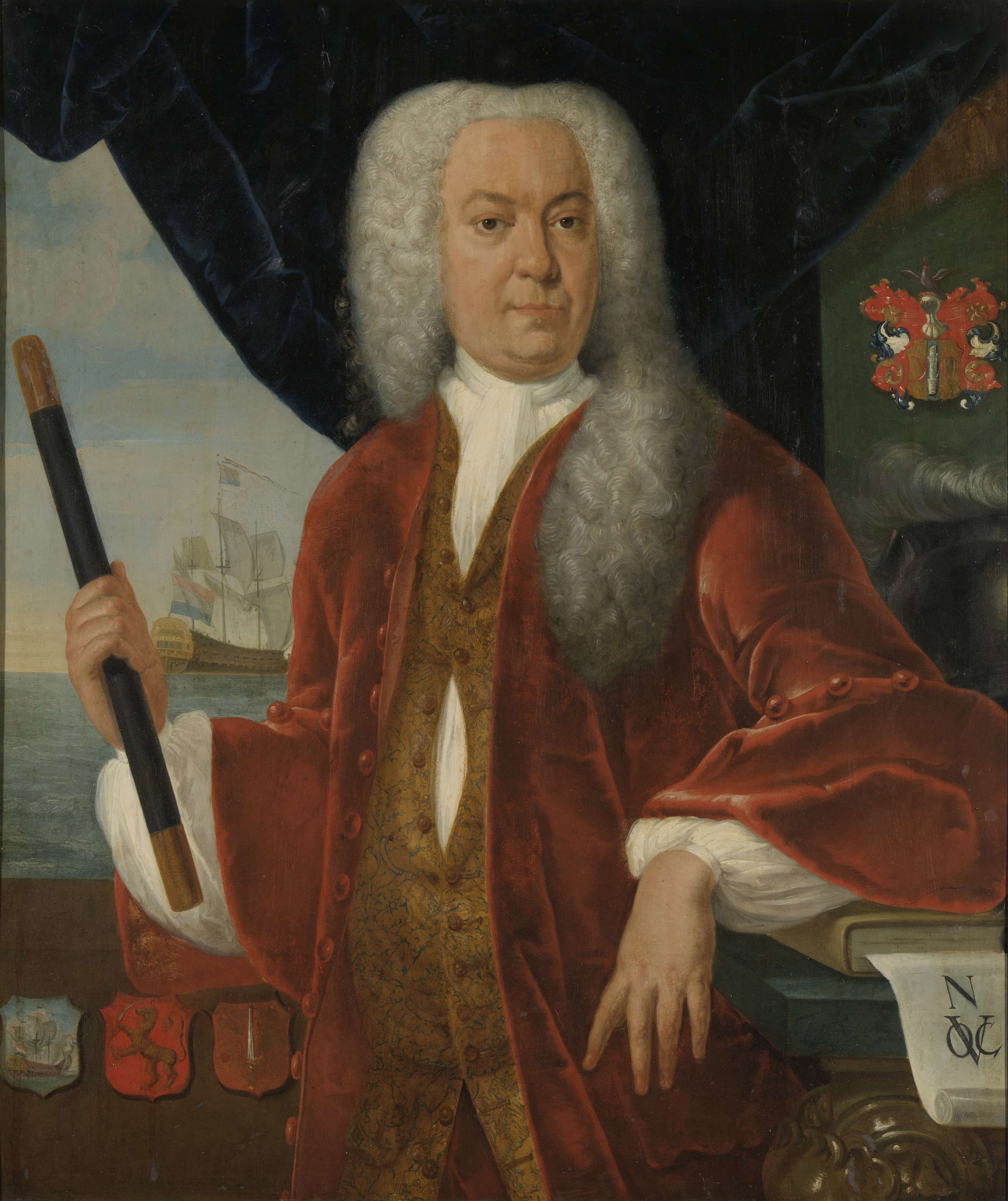
Governor-General Valckenier ordered the killings of ethnic Chinese.

During the early years of the Dutch colonisation of the East Indies (modern-day Indonesia), many people of Chinese descent were contracted as skilled artisans in the construction of Batavia on the northwestern coast of Java; they also served as traders, sugar mill workers, and shopkeepers. The economic boom, precipitated by trade between the East Indies and China via the port of Batavia, increased Chinese immigration to Java. The number of ethnic Chinese in Batavia grew rapidly, reaching a total of 10,000 by 1740. Thousands more lived outside the city walls. The Dutch colonials required them to carry registration papers, and deported those who did not comply to China.

The deportation policy was tightened during the 1730s, after an outbreak of malaria killed thousands, including the Governor-General of the Dutch East Indies, Dirck van Cloon. According to Indonesian historian Benny G. Setiono, the outbreak was followed by increased suspicion and resentment in native Indonesians and the Dutch toward the ethnic Chinese, who were growing in number and whose wealth was increasingly visible. As a result, Commissioner of Native Affairs Roy Ferdinand, under orders of Governor-General Adriaan Valckenier, decreed on 25 July 1740, that Chinese considered suspicious would be deported to Ceylon (modern day Sri Lanka) and forced to harvest cinnamon. Wealthy Chinese were extorted by corrupt Dutch officials who threatened them with deportation; Stamford Raffles, an explorer, administrator and historian of Java, noted in 1830 that in some Javanese accounts, the Dutch were told by the Dutch-appointed Chinese headman of Batavia, Nie Hoe Kong, to deport all Chinese wearing black or blue because these were thought to be poor. There were also rumors that deportees were not taken to their destinations but were thrown overboard once out of sight of Java, and in some accounts, they died when rioting on the ships. The deportation of ethnic Chinese caused unrest among the remaining Chinese, leading many Chinese workers to desert their jobs.

At the same time, native occupants of Batavia, including the ethnic Betawi servants, became increasingly distrustful of the Chinese. Economic factors played a role: most natives were poor, and perceived the Chinese as occupying some of the most prosperous neighbourhoods in the city. Although the Dutch historian Albertus Nicolaas Paasman notes that at the time the Chinese were the "Jews of Asia", the actual situation was more complicated. Many poor Chinese living in the area around Batavia were sugar mill workers who felt exploited by the Dutch and Chinese elites equally. Rich Chinese owned the mills and were involved in revenue farming and shipping; they drew income from milling and the distillation of arak, a molasses and rice-based alcoholic beverage. However, the Dutch overlords set the price for sugar, which itself caused unrest. Because of the decline of worldwide sugar prices that began in the 1720s caused by an increase in exports to Europe and competition from the West Indies, the sugar industry in the East Indies had suffered considerably. By 1740, worldwide sugar prices had dropped to half the price in 1720. As sugar was a major export, this caused considerable financial difficulties for the colony.

Initially some members of the Council of the Indies (Raad van Indië) believed that the Chinese would never attack Batavia, and stronger measures to control the Chinese were blocked by a faction led by Valckenier's political opponent, the former governor of Zeylan Gustaaf Willem van Imhoff, who returned to Batavia in 1738. Large numbers of Chinese arrived outside Batavia from nearby settlements, however, and on 26 September Valckenier called an emergency meeting of the council, during which he gave orders to respond to any ethnic Chinese uprisings with deadly force. This policy continued to be opposed by van Imhoff's faction; Vermeulen (1938) suggested that the tension between the two colonial factions played a role in the ensuing massacre.

On the evening of 1 October Valckenier received reports that a crowd of a thousand Chinese had gathered outside the gate, angered by his statements at the emergency meeting five days earlier. This report was received incredulously by Valckenier and the council. However, after the murder of a Balinese sergeant by the Chinese outside the walls, the council decided to take extraordinary measures and reinforce the guard. Two groups of 50 Europeans and some native porters were sent to outposts on the south and east sides of the city, and a plan of attack was formulated.

== Massacre ==
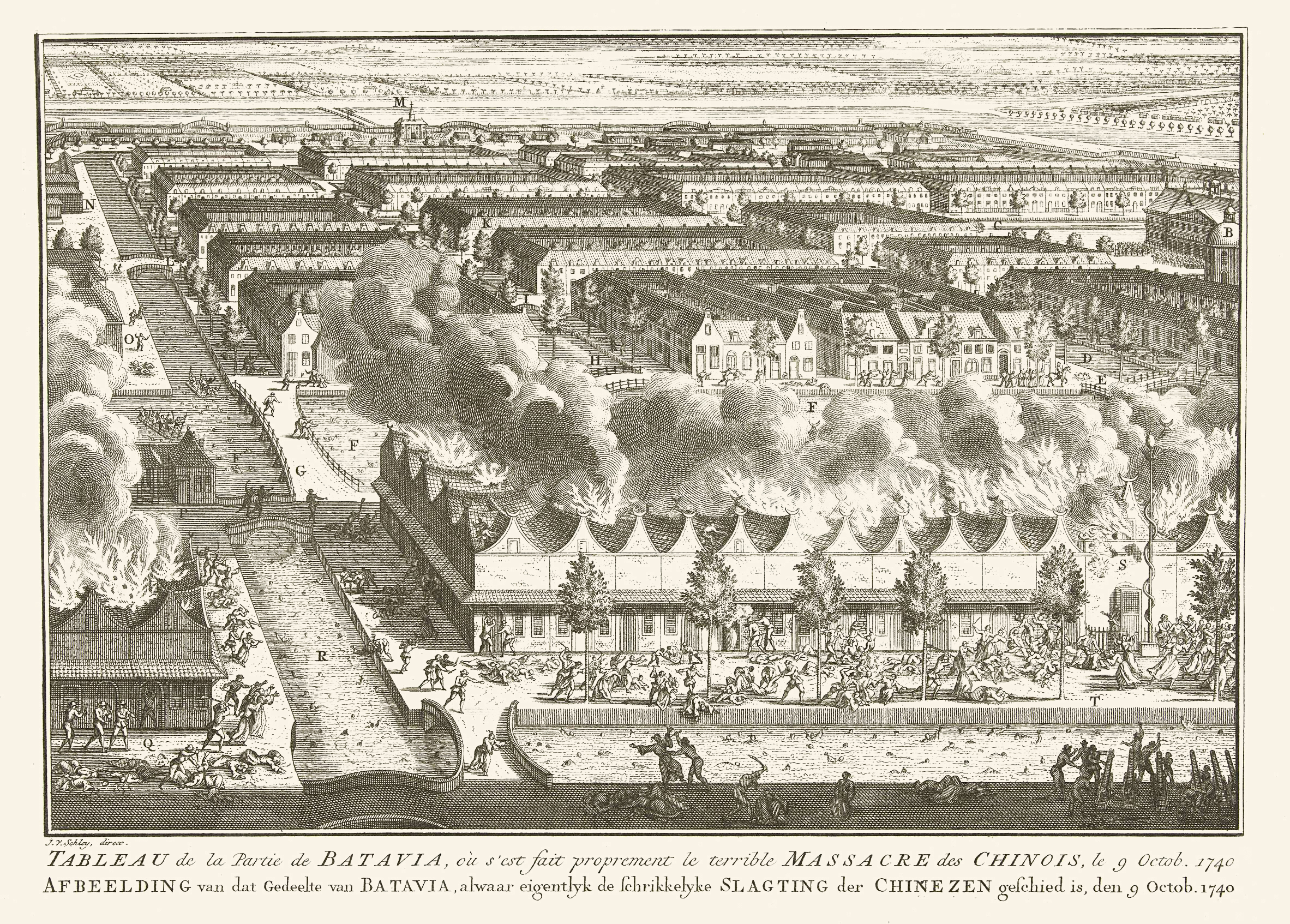
Chinese houses were burned during the massacre.

After groups of Chinese sugar mill workers revolted using custom-made weapons to loot and burn mills, hundreds of ethnic Chinese, (Note: For example, the minor post of Qual, located near the Tangerang River and staffed by 15 soldiers, was surrounded by at least five hundred Chinese.) suspected to have been led by Nie Hoe Kong, (Note: Kong is noted as surviving both the assault and the massacre. How he did so is not known; there is speculation that he had a secret cellar under his house or that he dressed in women's clothing and hid inside the governor's castle. W. R. van Hoëvell suggested that Kong gathered several hundred people after escaping the castle and hid in a Portuguese church near the Chinese quarters. He was later captured and accused of leading the uprising by the Dutch but, despite being tortured, did not confess.) killed 50 Dutch soldiers in Meester Cornelis (now Jatinegara) and Tanah Abang on 7 October. In response, the Dutch sent 1,800 regular troops, accompanied by schutterij (militia) and eleven battalions of conscripts to stop the revolt; they established a curfew and cancelled plans for a Chinese festival. Fearing that the Chinese would conspire against the colonials by candlelight, those inside the city walls were forbidden to light candles and were forced to surrender everything "down to the smallest kitchen knife". The following day the Dutch repelled an attack by up to 10,000 ethnic Chinese, led by groups from nearby Tangerang and Bekasi, at the city's outer walls; Raffles wrote that 1,789 Chinese died in this attack. In response, Valckenier called another meeting of the council on 9 October.

Meanwhile, rumors spread among the other ethnic groups in Batavia, including slaves from Bali and Sulawesi, Bugis, and Balinese troops, that the Chinese were plotting to kill, rape, or enslave them. These groups pre-emptively burned houses belonging to ethnic Chinese along the Besar River. The Dutch followed this with an assault on Chinese settlements elsewhere in Batavia in which they burned houses and killed people. The Dutch politician and critic of colonialism W. R. van Hoëvell wrote that "pregnant and nursing women, children, and trembling old men fell on the sword. Defenseless prisoners were slaughtered like sheep". (Note: Original: "... Zwangere vrouwen, zoogende moeders, argelooze kinderen, bevende grijsaards worden door het zwaard geveld. Den weerloozen gevangenen wordt als schapen de keel afgesneden".)

Troops under Lieutenant Hermanus van Suchtelen and Captain Jan van Oosten, a survivor from Tanah Abang, took station in the Chinese district: Suchtelen and his men positioned themselves at the poultry market, while van Oosten's men held a post along the nearby canal. At around 5:00 p.m., the Dutch opened fire on Chinese-occupied houses with cannon, causing them to catch fire. Some Chinese died in the burning houses, while others were shot upon leaving their homes or committed suicide in desperation. Those who reached the canal near the housing district were killed by Dutch troops waiting in small boats, while other troops searched in between the rows of burning houses, killing any survivors they found. These actions later spread throughout the city. Vermeulen notes that many of the perpetrators were sailors and other "irregular and bad elements" of society. (Note: Original: "... vele ongeregelde en slechte elementen ...") During this period there was heavy looting and seizures of property.

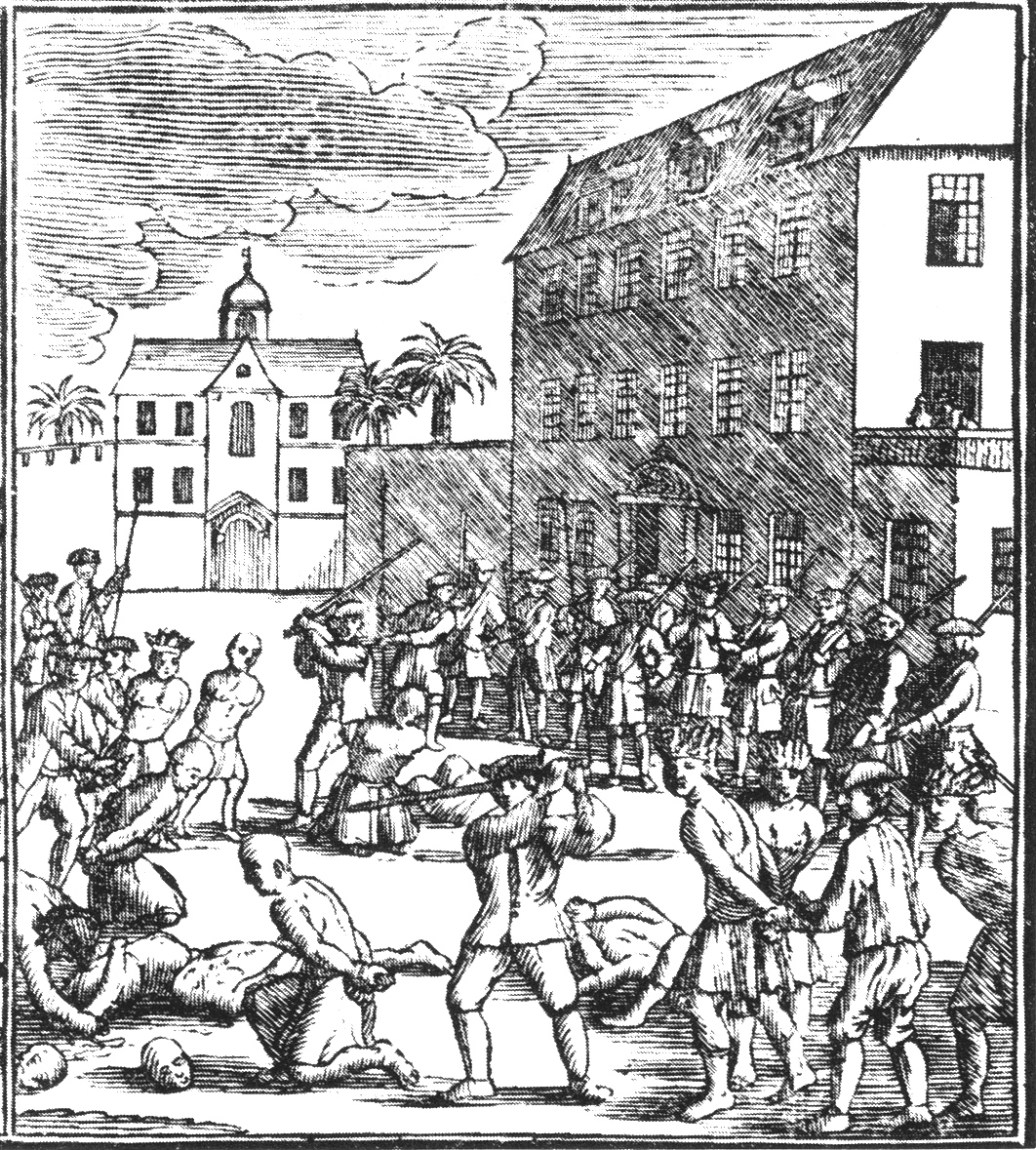
Chinese prisoners were executed by the Dutch on 10 October 1740.

The following day the violence continued to spread, and Chinese patients in a hospital were taken outside and killed. Attempts to extinguish fires in areas devastated the preceding day failed, and the flames increased in vigour, and continued until 12 October. Meanwhile, a group of 800 Dutch soldiers and 2,000 natives assaulted Kampung Gading Melati, where a group of Chinese survivors were holding up under the leadership of Khe Pandjang. (Note: Sources spell his name alternatively as Khe Pandjang, Que Pandjang, Si Pandjang, or Sie Pan Djiang. Setiono suggests that his actual name may have been Oie Panko.) Although the Chinese evacuated to nearby Paninggaran, they were later driven out of the area by Dutch forces. There were approximately 450 Dutch and 800 Chinese casualties in the two attacks.

=== Follow-up and further violence ===
On 11 October Valckenier unsuccessfully requested that officers control their troops and stop the looting. Two days later the council established a reward of two ducats for every Chinese head surrendered to the soldiers as an incentive for the other ethnic groups to assist in the purge. As a result, ethnic Chinese who had survived the initial assault were hunted by gangs of irregulars, who killed those Chinese they found for the reward. The Dutch worked with natives in different parts of Batavia; ethnic Bugis and Balinese grenadiers were sent to reinforce the Dutch on 14 October. On 22 October Valckenier called for all killings to cease. In a lengthy letter in which he blamed the unrest entirely on the Chinese rebels, Valckenier offered an amnesty to all Chinese, except for the leaders of the unrest, on whose heads he placed a bounty of up to 500 rijksdaalders.

Outside the walls, skirmishes between the Chinese rebels and the Dutch continued. On October 25, after almost two weeks of minor skirmishes, 500 armed Chinese approached Cadouwang (now Angke), but were repelled by cavalry under the command of Ritmeester Christoffel Moll and Cornets Daniel Chits and Pieter Donker. The following day the cavalry, which consisted of 1,594 Dutch and native forces, marched on the rebel stronghold at the Salapadjang sugar mill, first gathered in the nearby woods and then set the mill on fire while the rebels were inside; another mill at Boedjong Renje was taken in the same manner by another group. Fearful of the oncoming Dutch, the Chinese retreated to a sugar mill in Kampung Melayu, four hours from Salapadjang; this stronghold fell to troops under Captain Jan George Crummel. After defeating the Chinese and retaking Qual, the Dutch returned to Batavia. Meanwhile, the fleeing Chinese, who were blocked to the west by 3,000 troops from the Sultanate of Banten, headed east along the north coast of Java; by 30 October it was reported that the Chinese had reached Tangerang.

A ceasefire order reached Crummel on 2 November, upon which he and his men returned to Batavia after stationing a contingent of 50 men at Cadouwang. When he arrived at noon, there were no more Chinese inside Batavia's walls. On 8 November the Sultanate of Cirebon sent between 2,000 and 3,000 native troops to reinforce the city guard. Looting continued until at least 28 November, and the last native troops stood down at the end of that month.

== Aftermath ==
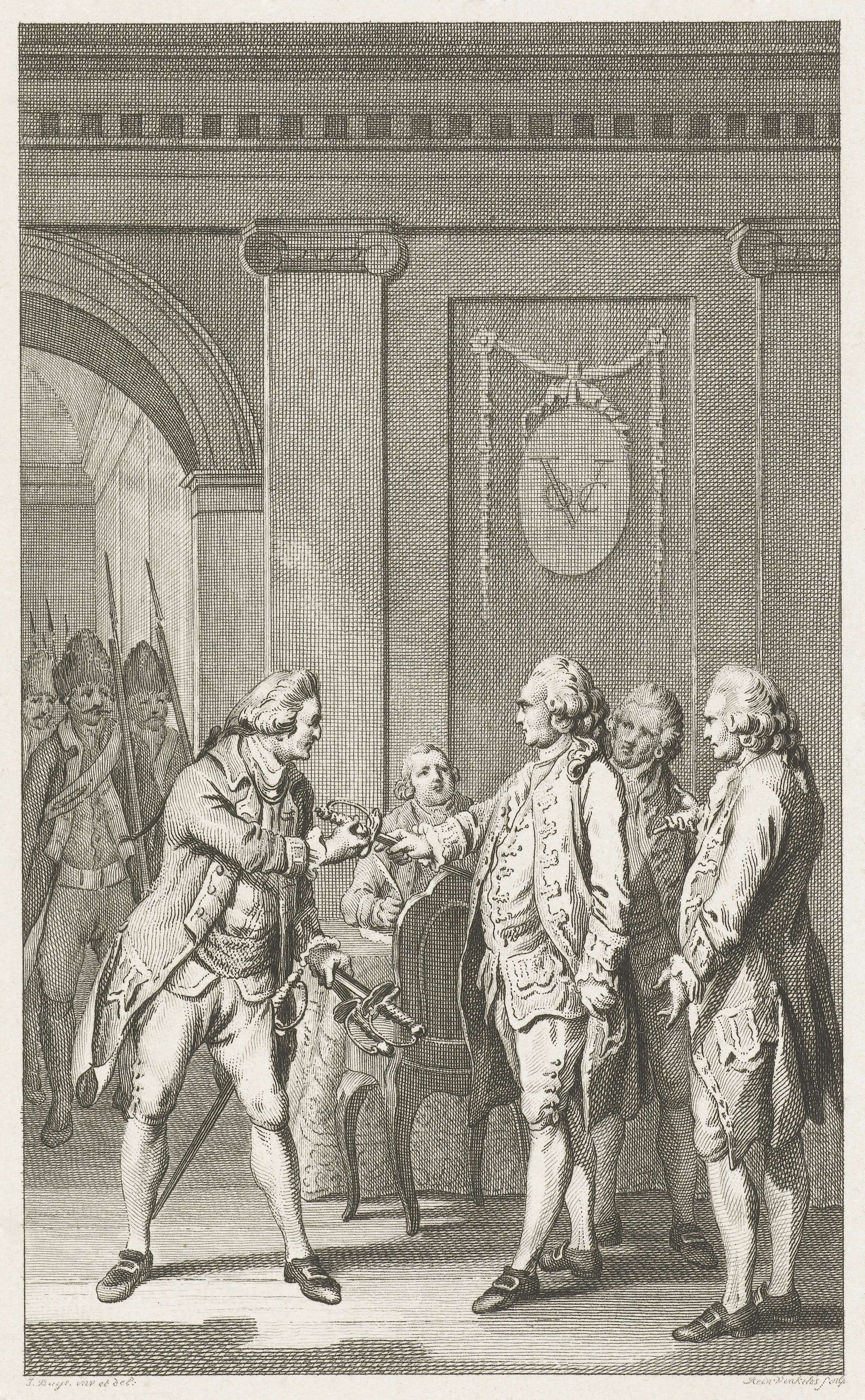
Van Imhoff and two fellow councilmen were arrested for insubordination after going against Valckenier.

Most accounts of the massacre estimate that 10,000 Chinese were killed within Batavia's city walls, while at least another 500 were seriously wounded. Between 600 and 700 Chinese-owned houses were raided and burned. Vermeulen gives a figure of 600 survivors, while the Indonesian scholar A.R.T. Kemasang estimates that 3,000 Chinese survived. The Indonesian historian Benny G. Setiono notes that 500 prisoners and hospital patients were killed, and a total of 3,431 people survived. The massacre was followed by an "open season" against the ethnic Chinese throughout Java, causing another massacre in 1741 in Semarang, and others later in Surabaya and Gresik.

As part of conditions for the cessation of violence, all of Batavia's ethnic Chinese were moved to a pecinan, or Chinatown, outside of the city walls, now known as Glodok. This allowed the Dutch to monitor the Chinese more easily. To leave the pecinan, ethnic Chinese required special passes. By 1743, however, ethnic Chinese had already returned to inner Batavia; several hundred merchants operated there. Other ethnic Chinese led by Khe Pandjang fled to Central Java where they attacked Dutch trading posts, and were later joined by troops under the command of the Javanese sultan of Mataram, Pakubuwono II. Though this further uprising was quashed in 1743, conflicts in Java continued almost without interruption for the next 17 years.

On 6 December 1740, van Imhoff and two fellow councillors were arrested on the orders of Valckenier for insubordination, and on 13 January 1741, they were sent to the Netherlands on separate ships; they arrived on 19 September 1741. In the Netherlands, van Imhoff convinced the council that Valckenier was to blame for the massacre and delivered an extensive speech entitled "Consideratiën over den tegenwoordigen staat van de Ned. O.I. Comp." ("Considerations on the Current Condition of the Dutch East Indies Company") on November 24. As a result of the speech, the charges against him and the other councillors were dismissed. On 27 October 1742, van Imhoff was sent back to Batavia on the Hersteller as the new governor-general of the East Indies, with high expectations from the Lords XVII, the leadership of the Dutch East India Company. He arrived in the Indies on 26 May 1743.

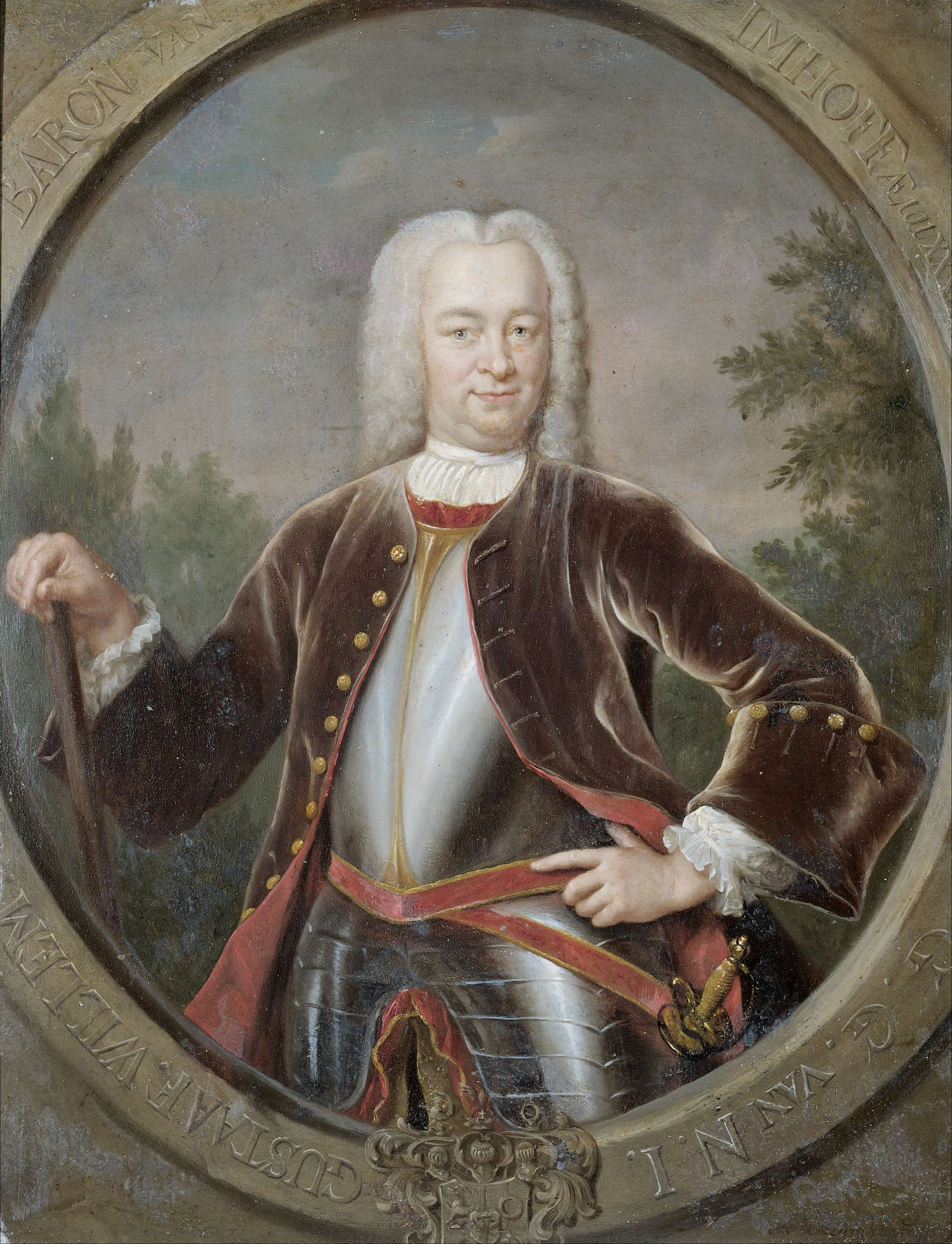
Van Imhoff was sent to the Netherlands, but later assigned as the new governor-general of the Dutch East Indies.

Valckenier had asked to be replaced late in 1740, and in February 1741 had received a reply instructing him to appoint van Imhoff as his successor; an alternative account indicates that the Lords XVII informed him that he was to be replaced by van Imhoff as punishment for exporting too much sugar and too little coffee in 1739 and thus causing large financial losses. By the time Valckenier received the reply, van Imhoff was already on his way back to the Netherlands. Valckenier left the Indies on 6 November 1741, after appointing a temporary successor, Johannes Thedens. Taking command of a fleet, Valckenier headed for the Netherlands. On 25 January 1742, he arrived in Cape Town but was detained, and investigated by governor Hendrik Swellengrebel by order of the Lords XVII. In August 1742 Valckenier was sent back to Batavia, where he was imprisoned in Fort Batavia and, three months later, tried on several charges, including his involvement in the massacre. In March 1744 he was convicted and condemned to death, and all his belongings were confiscated. In December 1744 the trial was reopened when Valckenier gave a lengthy statement to defend himself. Valckenier asked for more evidence from the Netherlands, but died in his prison cell on 20 June 1751, before the investigation was completed. The death penalty was rescinded posthumously in 1755. Vermeulen characterises the investigation as unfair and fuelled by popular outrage in the Netherlands, and arguably this was officially recognised because in 1760 Valckenier's son, Adriaan Isaäk Valckenier, received reparations totalling 725,000 gulden.

Sugar production in the area suffered greatly after the massacre, as many of the Chinese who had run the industry had been killed or were missing. It began to recover after the new governor-general, van Imhoff, "colonised" Tangerang. He initially intended for men to come from the Netherlands and work the land; he considered those already settled in the Indies to be lazy. However, he was unable to attract new settlers because of high taxes and thus sold the land to those already in Batavia. As he had expected, the new land-owners were unwilling to "soil their hands", and quickly rented out the land to ethnic Chinese. Production rose steadily after this, but took until the 1760s to reach pre-1740 levels, after which it again diminished. The number of mills also declined. In 1710 there had been 131, but by 1750 the number had fallen to 66.

After the 1740 massacre, it became apparent over the ensuing decades through a series of considerations that Batavia needed Chinese people for a long list of trades. Considerable Chinese economic expansion occurred in the late eighteenth century, and by 1814 there were 11,854 Chinese people within the total of 47,217 inhabitants.

== Legacy ==
Vermeulen described the massacre as "one of the most striking events in 18th-century [Dutch] colonialism". (Note: Original: "... markante feiten uit onze 18e-eeuwse koloniale geschiedenis tot onderwerp genomen".) In his doctoral dissertation, W. W. Dharmowijono notes that the attack has figured heavily in Dutch literature, early examples of which include a poem by Willem van Haren that condemned the massacre (dating from 1742) and an anonymous poem, from the same period, critical of the Chinese. Raffles wrote in 1830 that Dutch historical records are "far from complete or satisfactory".

Dutch historian Leonard Blussé writes that the massacre indirectly led to the rapid expansion of Batavia, and institutionalised a modus vivendi that led to a dichotomy between the ethnic Chinese and other groups, which could still be felt in the late 20th century. The massacre may also have been a factor in the naming of numerous areas in Jakarta. One possible etymology for the name of the Tanah Abang district (meaning "red earth") is that it was named for the Chinese blood spilled there; van Hoëvell suggests that the naming was a compromise to make the Chinese survivors accept amnesty more quickly. The name Rawa Bangke, for a subdistrict of East Jakarta, may be derived from the colloquial Indonesian word for corpse, bangkai, due to the great number of ethnic Chinese killed there; a similar etymology has been suggested for Angke in Tambora.

== See also ==
- 1918 Kudus riot
- Banjarmasin riot of May 1997
- Chinese Indonesian surname
- Chinese Indonesians
- Discrimination against Chinese Indonesians
- Indonesian mass killings of 1965–66
- Legislation on Chinese Indonesians
- May 1998 riots of Indonesia – riots in which many ethnic Chinese were targeted for violence
- Mergosono massacre
- Nanjing Massacre
- Rock Springs Massacre
