= Khe Pandjang =

18th-century rebel leader in Java

- Born: Batavia
- Disappeared: 1758; Bali, Dutch East Indies
- Occupation: Military leader
- Known for: Leading a rebellion against Dutch colonial forces

Khe Pandjang, also known as Khe Sepanjang, Que Pandjang, Si Pandjang, or Sie Pan Djiang was an 18th-century Indonesian military leader. Pandjang fought against Dutch forces during the Java War (1741–1743).

== Biography ==
=== Origin ===
Pandjang was originally from Batavia, a Dutch colony in Java. Batavia had been under Dutch control since 1619, when the Dutch East India Company had established a city of the same name. To develop the colony, the Dutch had allowed for thousands of Chinese immigrants to settle in Batavia. Over the next century, these immigrants developed a wealthy community within the Dutch colony. This wealth bred some resentment between the Chinese and the local population.

In the 1730s, a devastating malaria outbreak exacerbated issues between the Dutch, Sumatran, and Chinese communities. By 1740, this unrest had grown significantly, resulting in the Dutch colonial authorities cracking down on the rights of Batavia’s Chinese population. When the Chinese community (which numbered around 10,000 people) resisted these efforts, the Dutch governor-general of Batavia (Adriaan Valckenier) ordered the deportation or killing of the Chinese. This order resulted in the 1740 Batavia massacre, during which thousands of Chinese were killed by the Dutch and Sumatrans.

In the midst of the massacre, Khe Pandjang is recorded as having led a group of fleeing Chinese to Kampung Gading Melati. They were soon besieged by 800 Dutch soldiers and several thousand Sumatrans. However, the Chinese were able to break the siege and escape. Having fled Batavia, Pandjang and some of his followers escaped across the Sunda Strait to the island of Java.

=== Rebellion in Java ===
Upon arriving in Western Java, Pandjang attempted to lead his group to Banten. However, the local ruler of Banten blocked the roads and barred the Chinese from entering the city. Having been repulsed, Pandjang instead headed for Semarang, stopping in villages and towns to gather Chinese support for his army. Unlike the Sumatrans, many Javanese did not have an aversion to the Chinese, and a number of local leaders allowed the Chinese insurgents to operate inside their domains. As news of the Dutch actions in Batavia spread, many Chinese rose up in revolt in an attempt to seize control of Java and form a new nation. Pandjang allied himself with these Chinese rebels during what would become known as the Java War, and would become a noted military commander during the conflict.

In 1741, Pandjang and his insurgents captured the city of Bekasi in West Java. They held the city until being forced out by a local ruler, after which loss they joined a pro-Chinese Javanese army to capture Tegal.

In June 1742, Pandjang and a Javanese commander consolidated their forces and successfully took control of Kartosuro. However, the war in other parts of the island went poorly for the rebels, and by July 1742 the Dutch had reestablished control over much of the island. Pandjang and his forces held Kartosuro until December, but were then forced to retreat to Prambanan, pursued by a Dutch army. The rebels surrendered in early 1743, but Pandjang escaped capture and fled. He was last sighted in Bali in 1758.

== See also ==
- List of people who disappeared mysteriously (pre-1910)
